= John S. T. Gallagher =

American healthcare executive

- Died: April 18, 2015 (aged 83); Palm Beach, Florida, U.S.
- Education: College of the Holy Cross (BS); Yale University (MS)
- Occupation: Healthcare Executive
- Known for: Founding president and CEO of North Shore-LIJ Health System (now Northwell Health)

John S. T. Gallagher (December 9, 1931 – April 18, 2015), also known as ‘‘Jack Gallagher, was an American healthcare executive who was the founder, president, and CEO of the healthcare network Northwell Health.

== Biography ==
=== Early life and education ===
Gallagher was born on December 09, 1931, in Queens, New York. He attended Xavier High School and earned a Bachelor of Science degree from the College of the Holy Cross in 1953. He later received a Master of Science in public health and epidemiology from Yale University in 1963.

=== Career ===
Gallagher began his career in healthcare administration in 1960 as an intern at North Shore University Hospital in Manhasset, New York. He later became a hospital administrator in 1971 and executive vice president in 1982.

In 1992, Gallagher led the formation of the North Shore Health System, bringing together multiple hospitals under a unified structure. He played a central role in expanding the system through affiliations and mergers, including the 1997 merger with Long Island Jewish Medical Center. This merger created the North Shore–Long Island Jewish Health System, which later became Northwell Health.

Under his leadership, the organization expanded its clinical services and developed academic partnerships, including affiliations with Weill Cornell Medical College.

Following his retirement in 2002, Gallagher remained involved with the organization and continued to serve on its board until his death in 2015.

From 2002 to 2004, he served as Deputy County Executive for Health and Human Services in Nassau County, New York. In 2005, he was appointed interim chief executive officer of Stony Brook University Hospital during a leadership transition.

== Awards and honors ==
- Named to ‘‘Newsday’s “100 Most Influential Long Islanders of the Century” in 1999.
- Recipient of Long Island Business News “Entrepreneur of the Year Lifetime Achievement Award”.
- Recipient of the Ellis Island Medal of Honor.

== Personal life ==
Gallagher was married to Grace Gallagher, who died in 1999. They had six children.

== Death ==
Gallagher died on April 18, 2015, at the age of 83.
