= Syosset Hospital =

- Northwell Health

Geography
- Location: 221 Jericho Turnpike; Syosset, New York, United States
- Coordinates: 40°48′38″N 73°30′31″W

Organization
- Affiliated university: Zucker School of Medicine

Services
- Emergency department: Yes
- Beds: 136

History
- Opened: 1962

Links
- Website: syosset.northwell.edu
- Lists: Hospitals in New York State

Syosset Hospital (also known as Syosset Community Hospital and North Shore University Hospital at Syosset) is a short-term community hospital located in Syosset, New York, United States. The hospital has 70 beds and is affiliated with the Zucker School of Medicine. The hospital is a member of Northwell Health and operates as a division of North Shore University Hospital in Manhasset.

== History ==
Syosset Hospital was founded in 1962. It was designed by East Meadow-based architect Siegmund Spiegel and built at a cost of $4.5 million (1962 USD).

In 1980, the hospital went from being a proprietary medical institution to a non-profit hospital, being take over by the Baptist Medical Center of New York. In the same year, the hospital closed temporarily due to a nurse's strike.

In 1995, Syosset Hospital became a member of North Shore Health Systems Inc (now Northwell Health).

During the COVID-19 pandemic, nurses at the hospital protested Northwell's decision to extend the temporary closure of the hospital's psychiatric unit; Northwell temporarily closed it in order to house additional patients during the pandemic.

== Notable births ==
Aesop Rock – Rapper

== See also ==
- Glen Cove Hospital
- Huntington Hospital
- Plainview Hospital
