= Michael J. Dowling =

U.S. health insurance executive

- Education: University College Cork; Fordham University
- Title: President and CEO of Northwell Health (since 2002)

Michael J. Dowling is an Irish-American health care executive. He currently serves as president and chief executive officer of Northwell Health, a nonprofit integrated healthcare network in New York State.

== Early life and education ==
Dowling grew up in Knockaderry, Limerick, Ireland. He earned his undergraduate degree from University College Cork and his master's degree from Fordham University. He played hurling at University College, winning a Fitzgibbon Cup medal. He later played with Limerick and won a National League medal.

== Career ==
In 1979, Dowling became a professor at Fordham University and director of the Tarrytown campus. He went on to be a professor of social policy and assistant dean at the Graduate School of Social Services. After working at Fordham, Dowling served in New York State government as state director of Health, Education and Human Services and deputy secretary to former governor Mario Cuomo. He was also commissioner of the New York State Department of Social Services.

In 1995, Dowling was hired as a senior vice president at Empire Blue Cross and Blue Shield (part of Anthem). Dowling was named executive vice president and chief operating officer when he joined Northwell Health. On 1 January 2002, Dowling became president and CEO of the company.

== Awards ==
In 2011, Dowling received the Gail L. Warden Leadership Excellence Award from the National Center for Healthcare Leadership. In 2012, he received the B'nai B'rith National Healthcare Award. He has also received the National Human Relations Award from the American Jewish Committee, the Ellis Island Medal of Honor, the Distinguished Public Service Award from the State University of New York’s Nelson A. Rockefeller College of Public Affairs and Policy and the Gold Medal from the American Irish Historical Society.

== Boards and institutes ==
Dowling has been a member of the Institute of Medicine of the National Academies and chairman of the North American Board of the Smurfit School of Business at University College Dublin, Ireland. He has also served as a board member and chair of the Institute for Healthcare Improvement. Dowling has also been a board member of the National Center for Healthcare Leadership, the Greater New York Hospital Association, the Healthcare Association of New York State and the League of Voluntary Hospitals of New York.
