= Cohen Children's Medical Center =

- Northwell Health

Geography
- Location: 269-01 76th Avenue; New Hyde Park, New York, United States
- Coordinates: 40°45′11″N 73°42′30″W

Organization
- Type: Children's teaching hospital
- Affiliated university: Zucker School of Medicine

Services
- Emergency department: Level I Pediatric Trauma Center
- Beds: 195

Helipads
- Helipad: No

History
- Former name: Schneider Children's Hospital
- Constructed: 2010 (Expanded Pavilion)
- Opened: 1983 (Original Building); 2013 (Expanded Pavilion)

Links
- Website: childrenshospital.northwell.edu
- Lists: Hospitals in New York State
- Other links: Hospitals in Queens

Steven and Alexandra Cohen Children's Medical Center at Long Island Jewish Medical Center, formerly Schneider Children's Hospital and North Shore-LIJ Children's Hospital is a pediatric acute care children's teaching hospital located in New Hyde Park, New York. The hospital has 195 beds and is affiliated with the Zucker School of Medicine. The hospital is a member of Northwell Health and is the only children's hospital in the network.

The hospital provides comprehensive pediatric specialties and subspecialties to those aged 0–21 throughout Long Island and New York state. Cohen Children's also sometimes treats adults that require pediatric care. The hospital also features the largest ACS verified Level I Pediatric Trauma Center in the region. Cohen Children's Medical Center is the largest provider of pediatric health services in New York state. The hospital is attached to Long Island Jewish Medical Center and is adjacent to the Ronald Mcdonald House of Long Island.

== History ==
Pediatrics at Long Island Jewish Hospital dated back to 1956 when a new nursery to treat premature newborns is built into LIJ's facility, providing neonatal care to the families of Long Island. After twenty years of lobbying for a new children's hospital, the hospital opened up in November 1983 under the name Schneider Children's Hospital.

The new hospital was named after the Schneider family, a major benefactor of the health system. The hospital was a pioneer in creating a warm environment specifically for pediatric patients. The hospital became the second freestanding children's hospital in the New York region.

In 1989, the hospital affiliated with the Albert Einstein College of Medicine (AECOM). When the Zucker School of Medicine was completed in 2008, the hospital ended its affiliation with the AECOM. In 2010, North Shore-LIJ senior vice president, Keith Thompson announced that the Schneider family requested removal of their name from the hospital so they could better focus their efforts on the Schneider Children's Medical Center in Israel.

The hospital was temporarily renamed to North Shore-LIJ Children's Hospital on an interim basis while searching for a new name. In April 2010, it was announced that the Steven and Alexandra Cohen Foundation had donated $50 million to the hospital and the hospital was to be renamed to Cohen Children's Medical Center to honor the donation.

In 2010 child actor, Shannon Tavarez former star of The Lion King died of leukemia at the hospital.

The money was used to build a new pediatric wing to the hospital adding a new pediatric ed, a new 24-bed PICU, and a 25-bed surgical unit and a surgery center with six operating rooms dedicated to pediatrics. The new addition completed in 2013.

In 2017 the hospital gained international attention when they successfully removed a six-pound tumor from 12-year-old Gambian child, Janet Sylvia. The operation was arranged through the Global Medical Relief Fund and performed for free.

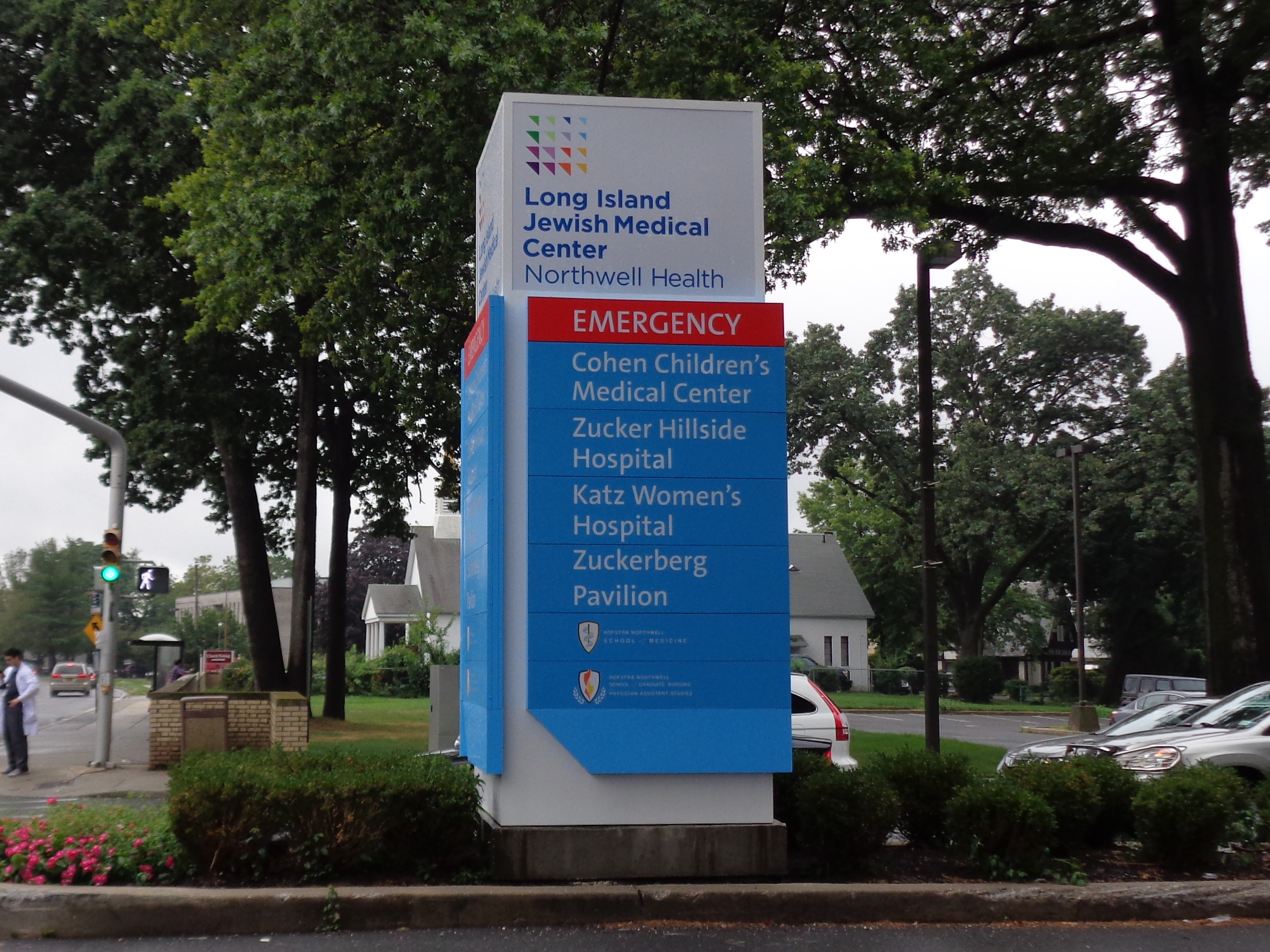
Sign on the LIJ/CCMC campus in New Hyde Park.

== Awards ==
In 2015, hospital ranked #21 on "The 50 Most Amazing Children's Hospitals in the World" by Healthcare Administration rankings.

In 2016, the hospital ranked in 7 different pediatric specialties on the U.S. News & World Report.

In 2018, the hospital was rated as the second best children's hospital in the New York area.

In 2020, Cohen Children's Medical Center also received two awards from the Women's Choice Awards hospital rankings; Best Children's Hospital and Best Pediatric Emergency Care.

== Rankings ==
In 2025, Cohen Children's tied as the #1 children's hospital in New York and placed nationally in 10 ranked pediatric specialties.

U.S. News & World Report Rankings for Cohen Children's Medical Center
Specialty	Rank (In the U.S.)
Neonatology	#18
Pediatric & Adolescent Behavioral Health	Top 50
Pediatric Cancer	#23
Pediatric Diabetes & Endocrinology	#29
Pediatric Gastroenterology & GI Surgery	#44
Pediatric Nephrology	#20
Pediatric Neurology & Neurosurgery	#24
Pediatric Orthopedics	#27
Pediatric Pulmonology & Lung Surgery	#23
Pediatric Urology	#18

== See also ==
- List of children's hospitals in the United States
- LIJ Medical Center
- North Shore University Hospital
- Northwell Health
- Kravis Children's Hospital
