= The Chiari Institute =

Coordinates: 40.782771°N 73.716084°W

The Chiari Institute is a medical institution that focuses on the treatment of Arnold–Chiari malformation and syringomyelia. It was established in 2001 by the North Shore-LIJ Health System, and is located in Great Neck, New York. The institute was founded by Thomas H. Milhorat, MD shortly after he was appointed the Chairman of Neurosurgery at the North Shore-Long Island Jewish Health System, and Paolo Bolognese, MD. It is now led by Raj Narayan, MD. Paolo Bolognese left TCI on September, 1st, 2014

The institute itself is used as a treatment facility for patients with Chiari malformations and related illnesses. Research projects are carried out at the Boas-Marks Research Center, located on the campus of North Shore University Hospital. While working with the Chiari Institute, Milhorat and Bolognese have published several articles related to the diagnosis and treatment of Chiari malformations.

== Research ==
The Chiari Institute has been listed as a contributing facility to a number of published medical findings and reports. Most, if not all, have involved the work of Thomas Milhorat and Paolo Bolognese.

In 2003 a case report was published stating that, contrary to previously held belief, syringomyelia can present with a rapid progression of acute symptoms and requires the immediate placing of a ventriculoperitoneal shunt. They also published the first description of a decompression surgery utilizing color Doppler sonography. This technique has been used by Bolognese since 1999, and at the time the article was published had been used in more than 300 surgeries. This technique is meant to improve surgical technique and monitor patient-specific variables.

In 2007 they established an association between type one Chiari malformations and hereditary disorders of connective tissue. Both conditions can cause hypermobility of the neck and cranial settling. While the conditions are often treated differently, the findings showed that 12.7% of patients with type one Chiari malformations also presented with hereditary disorders of connective tissue and/or Ehlers–Danlos syndrome.

More recently, the doctors from the Chiari Institute published a paper saying that syncope is a potential symptom of Eagle syndrome, a condition in which the temporal bone of the skull is elongated and conflicts with other anatomy.

== Lawsuits ==
The first lawsuit against the institute to receive media attention was that of Jennifer Ronca who, on April 10, 2009, was anesthetized and prepared for a brain surgery that did not happen. Bolognese, her scheduled surgeon, was in Florida at the time of the surgery and Milhorat, the surgeon on call who had previously operated on Ronca, refused to perform the operation in his stead. Ronca was falsely told that Bolognese had a family emergency and her surgery was rescheduled for three weeks later. Both doctors were suspended by the North Shore University Hospital, though Bolognese has been reinstated. Milhorat resigned from his position.

The media has reported on various pending lawsuits, including a class-action lawsuit. According to these lawsuits, patients were purposefully misdiagnosed and told that the procedure used for tethered spinal cord syndrome would alleviate the symptoms of their Chiari malformations. The lawsuits allege that informed consent was not acquired before these experimental procedures and that none of the required funding or approvals can be found for any such research with either the National Institutes of Health (NIH) or the Institutional Review Board (IRB).

None of these suits have been resolved, and no trial dates are known.
