= Glen Cove Hospital =

Hospital in New York

- Northwell Health
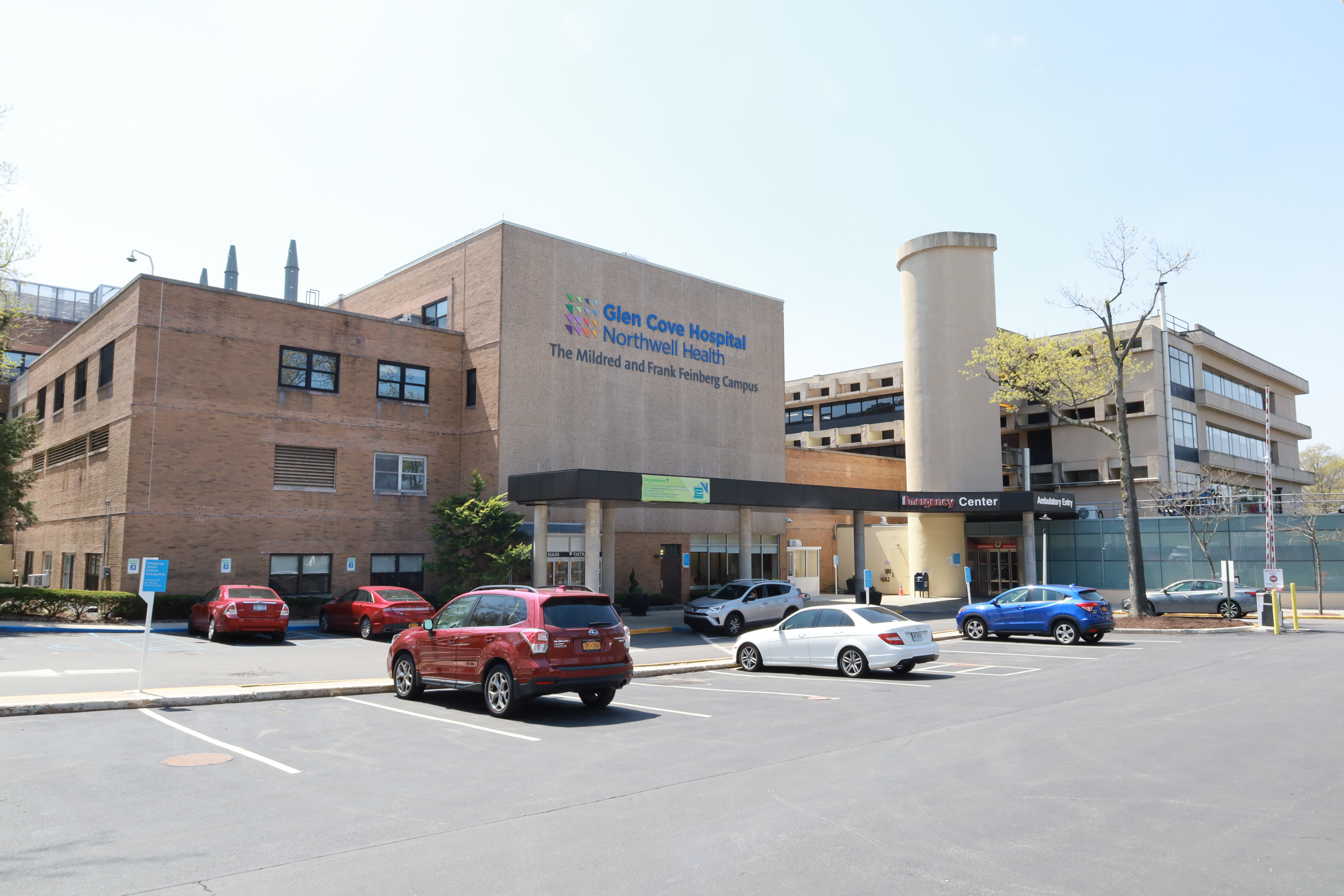
- North façade of the hospital in 2021

Geography
- Location: Glen Cove, New York, United States
- Coordinates: 40°52′15″N 73°37′21″W

Services
- Emergency department: Yes
- Beds: 119

History
- Opened: 1921

Links
- Website: glencove.northwell.edu
- Lists: Hospitals in New York State

Glen Cove Hospital is a hospital in Glen Cove, New York, United States, that is part of the Northwell Health system. It was founded in 1921 and moved to its current location in 1927. From 1927 to 1955, it was known as North Country Community Hospital, and at other times it had various names referencing Glen Cove.

== Early history ==
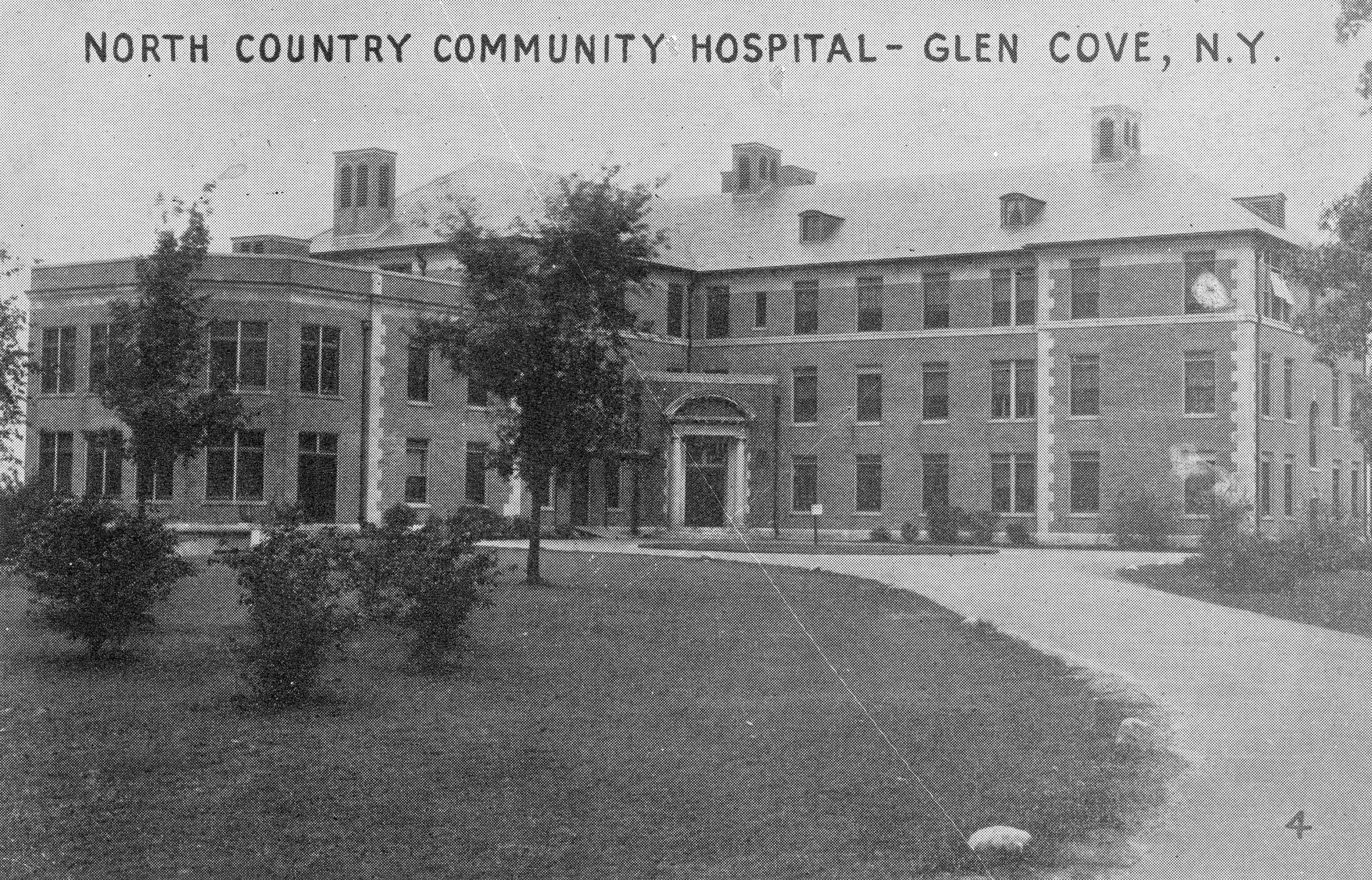
The original hospital building around 1930

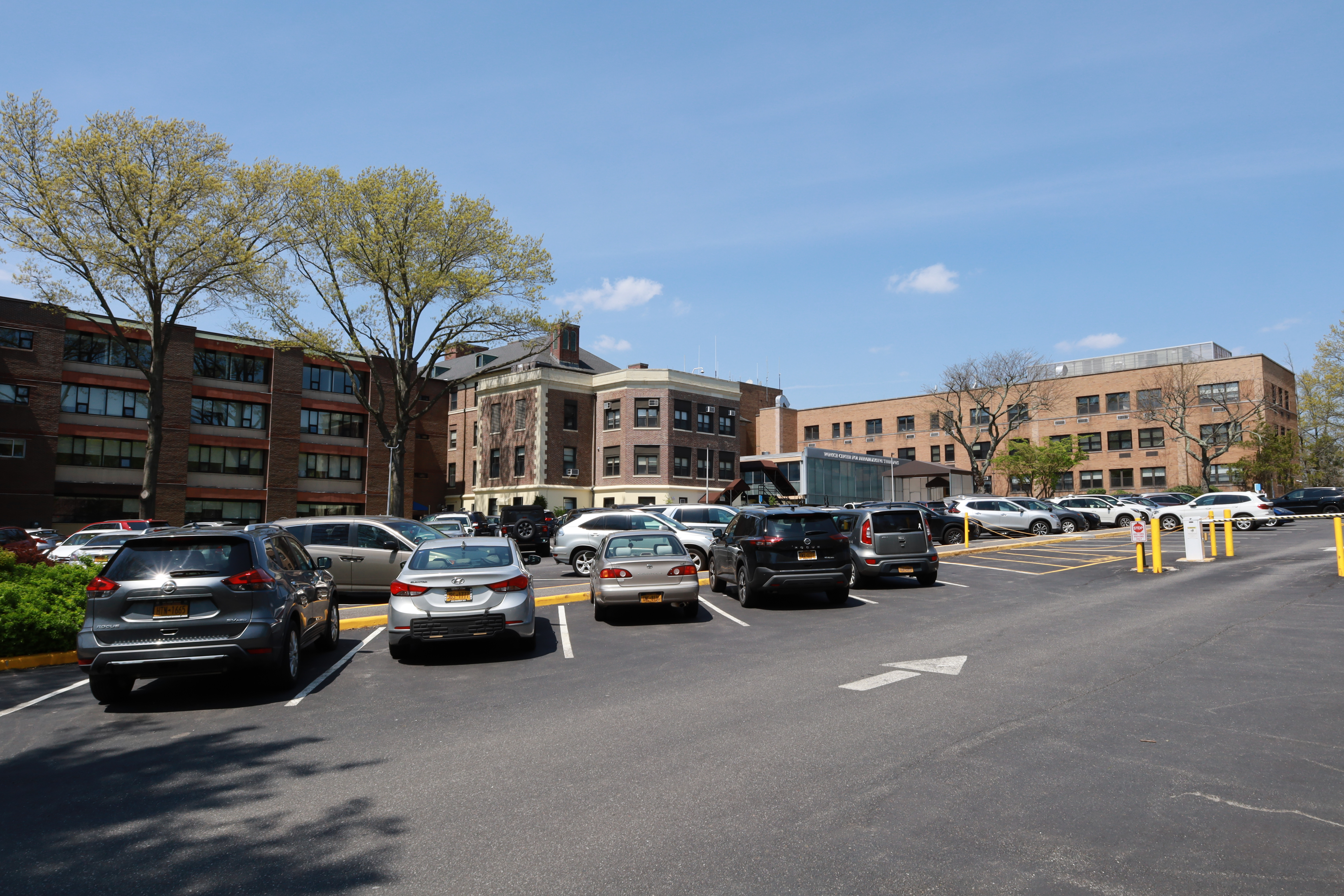
The hospital in 2021 from the southeast. The original building is visible at center, flanked by additions constructed in the 1950s.

It was incorporated on September 6, 1921. It was initially named Glen Cove Community Hospital and operated out of a three-story brick Colonial mansion on Glen Street, which was remodeled to provide accommodations for twenty patients.

It outgrew these facilities, so its current campus on St. Andrew's Lane was purchased and a new building constructed. The building, to be named North Country Community Hospital, was three stories with space for 112 beds, with a separate nurses' home and service building. Its architect was Peabody, Wilson & Brown. The hospital was funded by subscription, with wealthy donors providing three-quarters of the $1,250,000, and the general public providing the rest. A total of 5,000 people donated towards the effort. At the cornerstone-laying ceremony in 1926, a significant number of its doctors resigned to protest wealthy donors on the new hospital's board handpicking its medical board. It opened on September 15, 1927, with its first birth occurring less than an hour after its opening.

A new wing, increasing capacity to 150, opened in 1951. In 1956, construction began on a south wing to increase capacity from 180 to 250.

In 1955, the name was changed to Community Hospital at Glen Cove. The hospital had sued the new North Shore Hospital in nearby Manhasset, New York, over its name, contending that they were too similar, leading to errors in the delivery of medicines and other supplies, mail, and the writing of checks. Upon losing, it decided to change its own name to prevent confusion.

In 1971, a new four-story north wing opened, containing a new lobby and emergency room, and facilities for rehabilitation medicine, intensive care, pediatrics, radiology, social services, and admissions. A further expansion occurred in the 1980s.

== Later history ==
The hospital was acquired by North Shore University Hospital in 1990. North Shore University Hospital would merge with Long Island Jewish Medical Center in 1997, and the combined system would be renamed Northwell Health in 2015. During this time the hospital was known as North Shore University Hospital at Glen Cove.

In 2003, the maternity ward and obstetrics unit were closed. However, its emergency room was upgraded, and in 2006, it was announced that the critical care unit would be renovated. In 2006, the campus was given the additional name, The Mildred and Frank Feinberg Campus.

In 2014, the hospital's staff was reduced by about half, with its orthopedic surgery unit moving to Syosset Hospital. This led to concerns that the hospital would close or be converted to an ambulatory care center, but this did not happen. In 2019, a major renovation and expansion began of the hospital's outpatient Family Medicine Center.
