= USCIPP =

Healthcare organization

The US Cooperative for International Patient Programs (USCIPP) is an organizational membership program of the National Center for Healthcare Leadership (NCHL), a Chicago, Illinois, United States-based nonprofit. USCIPP is composed of US academic medical centers, hospitals, and healthcare systems that operate in the international patient care and global healthcare collaborations market.

Founded in 2010, with support from the International Trade Administration's Market Development Cooperator Program, the consortium now represents nearly 60 US healthcare provider organizations. USCIPP's members work together to increase the global competitiveness of US hospitals in several ways:

- expand international access to US medical expertise
- conduct research and market analysis on international trade in healthcare services
- facilitate the inter-organizational sharing of best practices in caring for international patients as well as in executing collaborative healthcare projects outside of the US.

While all of USCIPP's member institutions share a focus on providing care to international patients who travel to the US for treatment, the majority of its members also engage in non-patient international collaborations, such as cross-border education programs, providing management services to organizations in other countries, offering consulting services to hospitals and governments abroad, and/or engaging in international, joint clinical research.

== Member Organizations ==
- Ann & Robert H. Lurie Children's Hospital of Chicago
- Atrium Health
- Baptist Health South Florida
- Baylor St. Luke's Medical Center
- Boston Children's Hospital
- Broward Health International
- Cancer Treatment Centers of America
- Cedars-Sinai Medical Center
- Children's Hospital Los Angeles
- Children's Hospital of Philadelphia
- Children's Mercy Hospital
- Children's National Hospital
- Cincinnati Children's Hospital Medical Center
- City of Hope National Medical Center
- Cleveland Clinic
- Cook Children's Medical Center
- Dana-Farber Cancer Institute
- Dignity Health International
- Gillette Children's Specialty Healthcare
- Henry Ford Health
- Hospital for Special Surgery
- Houston Methodist
- Indiana University Health
- Johns Hopkins Medicine International
- Keck School of Medicine of USC
- Kennedy Krieger Institute
- Mass General Brigham
- Mayo Clinic
- MD Anderson Cancer Center
- MedStar Georgetown University Hospital
- Memorial Hermann Health System
- Memorial Hermann–Texas Medical Center & TIRR Memorial Hermann
- Memorial Sloan Kettering Cancer Center
- Moffitt Cancer Center
- Mount Sinai Health System
- Nationwide Children's Hospital
- New York University Langone Health
- New York-Presbyterian Hospital
- Nicklaus Children's Hospital
- Northwell Health
- Northwestern Medicine
- Ochsner Health System
- Rush University Medical Center
- Ryan AbilityLab
- Sharp HealthCare
- Stanford University School of Medicine
- Texas Children's Hospital
- The James Cancer Hospital
- The Paley Institute at St. Mary's Medical Center
- University of Chicago Medical Center
- University Hospitals Cleveland Medical Center
- UCLA Health
- UC San Diego Health
- UCSF Medical Center
- University of Pennsylvania Health System
- University of Pittsburgh Medical Center and UPMC Children's Hospital of Pittsburgh
- Washington University School of Medicine
- Yale International Medicine Program
