= Harold Miller (naval officer) =

American naval officer

Harold Blaine Miller
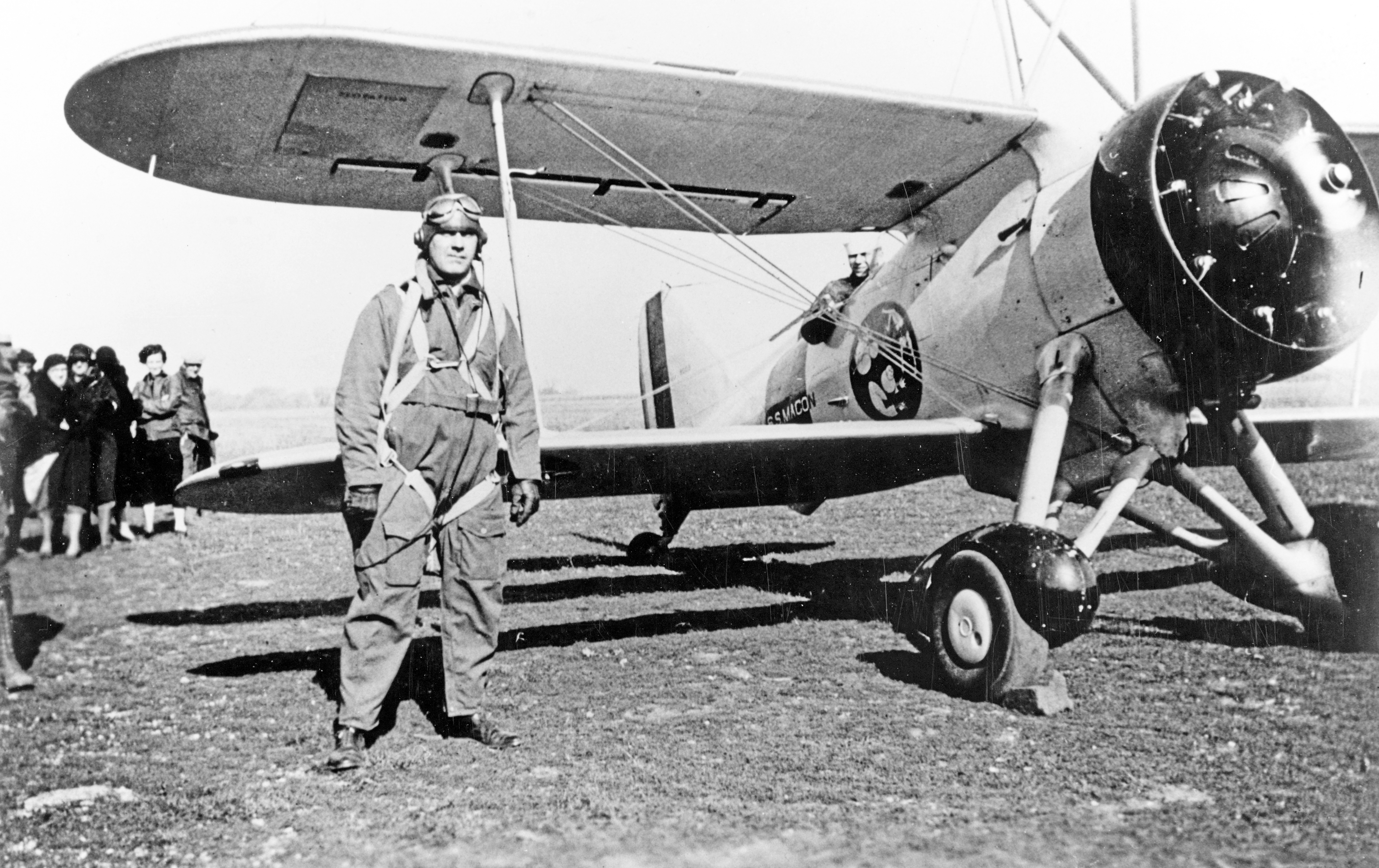
- Miller in Newton, Iowa, in 1933

Director of Public Relations of the United States Navy
- In office 1945–1946

Executive Director of President's Committee for Traffic Safety
- In office 1953–1957
- President: Dwight D. Eisenhower

Personal details
- Born: January 4, 1903 Newton, Iowa, U.S.
- Died: May 15, 1992 (aged 89) Overland Park, Kansas, U.S.
- Spouse(s): Jean Dupont; Mary Emory Hodgkinson (m. 1946; died 1952); Mary Louise McGee (m. 1953)
- Children: 3
- Education: United States Naval Academy
- Known for: Public relations; U.S. Navy service; writing; politics
- Awards: Legion of Merit; Gold Star
- Nickname: "Min" Miller

Military service
- Allegiance: United States
- Branch/service: United States Navy
- Years of service: 1924–1946
- Rank: Rear Admiral
- Battles/wars: World War II

Harold Blaine "Min" Miller (January 4, 1903 – 1992) was an American rear admiral, aviation pioneer, publicist, public relations executive, politician, and college administrator. He became the youngest rear admiral in the United States Navy in history, at the age of 42.

Miller is best known for his work in the Pacific Theatre for the United States Navy in World War II, after being chosen by Secretary of War James V. Forrestal to transform and lead CINCPAC naval communications offices for Admiral Chester W. Nimitz's Pacific Fleet. He is known for his publications, his various appointed and elected positions in local and national government, his work as a public relations executive, and his role as a college administrator.

== Early life and education ==
Miller was born on January 4, 1903, in Newton, Iowa. His family moved to his childhood home of Los Angeles, California, where he was raised and attended school. In 1908, his mother took him to see the Great White Fleet in San Pedro, Los Angeles. This experience inspired him throughout his formative years.

He attended the Westlake School for Boys in Los Angeles, during which time he competed for an appointment to join the United the United States Naval Academy in Annapolis, Maryland; he was ultimately appointed to the academy in 1920, after two rounds of testing. He moved to Annapolis for his schooling, graduating from USNA in 1924.

== Career ==
=== Military ===
Following his 1924 graduation from the United States Naval Academy, Miller spent two years sailing aboard the USS California (BB-44).

In 1937, while serving, he published Navy Wings, one of the first full-length books written detailing the early history of aviation in the United States Navy.

In 1944, Miller was chosen by Secretary of War James V. Forrestal to reform and lead CINCPAC naval communications offices for Admiral Chester W. Nimitz's Pacific Fleet. During this tenure, Miller introduced the policy of the officer in that rank being available to answer press questions at any time of the day or night. The Navy tasked him with improving the Navy's publicity and better share important information that had previously been considered to have been overshadowed by General Douglas MacArthur's media attention. He assisted Nimitz, Forrestal, and the Navy through the role by planning and implementing the reforms, and through introducing new policies and initiatives. This included enlisting men to report to local papers back in the United States, recruiting photographer Edward Steichen to help document the events, and by having 20th Century Fox film The Fighting Lady that year.

In April 1945, seeing Miller's success in the Pacific, Secretary Forrestal ordered Miller back to Washington, D.C., where Forrestal made him the director of public relations for the entirety of the United States Navy. That year, Miller became the youngest person in the United States Navy to be ranked rear admiral, at the age of 42. Serving in this capacity, Miller continued reforming naval communications and procedures, making the flow of information more transparent to both the military and the American public.

In 1946, following the end of World War II and one year as the public relations director of the Navy, Rear Admiral Miller retired from the United States Armed Forces with the permanent rank of rear admiral. Honors included the Legion of Merit, and the Gold Star in lieu of a second Legion of Merit.

=== Post-military ===
After retiring from the Navy in 1946 as rear admiral, Miller became a public relations executive, utilizing the experience he gained in communications while serving. He continued writing books, including children's books. In 1946, he became vice president for public relations Trans World Airlines. He held that position until 1947, when he was picked and appointed by the federal government as the executive director of the Congressional Aviation Policy Board, serving for one year, and then as the Information Director of the American Petroleum Institute between 1948 and 1957.

In 1953, he was appointed by President Dwight D. Eisenhower as the executive director of the President's Committee for Traffic Safety and served until 1957. Miller was picked and appointed by the federal government in 1952 as the president of the National Committee for a Free Europe – and as the outlet's head. He was the director of the Oil Industry Information Committee.

For 11 years between 1957 and 1968, Miller had multiple executive roles for Pan American World Airways, including as public relations director. In 1968, Miller became the vice president of university affairs at Hofstra University in Hempstead, New York, from which he retired after six years in 1974.

About this time, Miller moved to Flower Hill, New York, a village located near Manhasset in Nassau County on Long Island, just east of New York City. He became involved in village politics, and became a village trustee in Flower Hill.

Miller and McGee eventually left Flower Hill and moved to Shawnee Mission, Kansas.

== Personal life ==
Miller was married three times. First was to Jean Dupont, birthing one child and ending in divorce. From 1946, he was married to Mary Emory Hodgkinson, until her death in 1952. In 1953, he married his third wife, Mary Louise McGee; they remained together for 38 years, until his death in 1992.

== Death ==
Miller died on May 15, 1992, at the Americana Nursing Home in Overland Park, Kansas, aged 89, after multiple ailments. He was survived by his third wife, Mary Louise McGee, his three children, his five grandchildren, and his two great-grandchildren.

== See also ==
- Emil V. Cianciulli
- Chester W. Nimitz
- Charles Vachris
- John W. Walter
