= Siegmund Spiegel =

German-American architect and Holocaust survivor (1919–2016)

- Born: November 13, 1919; Gera, Germany
- Died: July 14, 2016 (aged 96); Florida, United States
- Burial place: Arlington National Cemetery
- Education: City College of New York; Columbia University; Hofstra University (honorary degree)
- Occupation: Architect
- Years active: 20th century
- Known for: Architecture, authoring, lecturing, activism
- Notable work: Syosset Hospital
- Spouse: Ruth (m. April 13, 1945)
- Children: 2
- Awards: Purple Heart; Bronze Star Medal; Croix de-Guerre-Avec Palme; Legion of Honour; Honorary Doctor of Humane Letters (Hofstra University)

Siegmund "Sig" Spiegel (November 13, 1919 – July 14, 2016) was a Jewish architect, war hero, author, activist, and Holocaust lecturer. A German-American, he fled Nazi Germany to the United States in 1938, following his sister. As an architect he was best known for his extensive work in the New York Metropolitan area.

== Biography and career ==
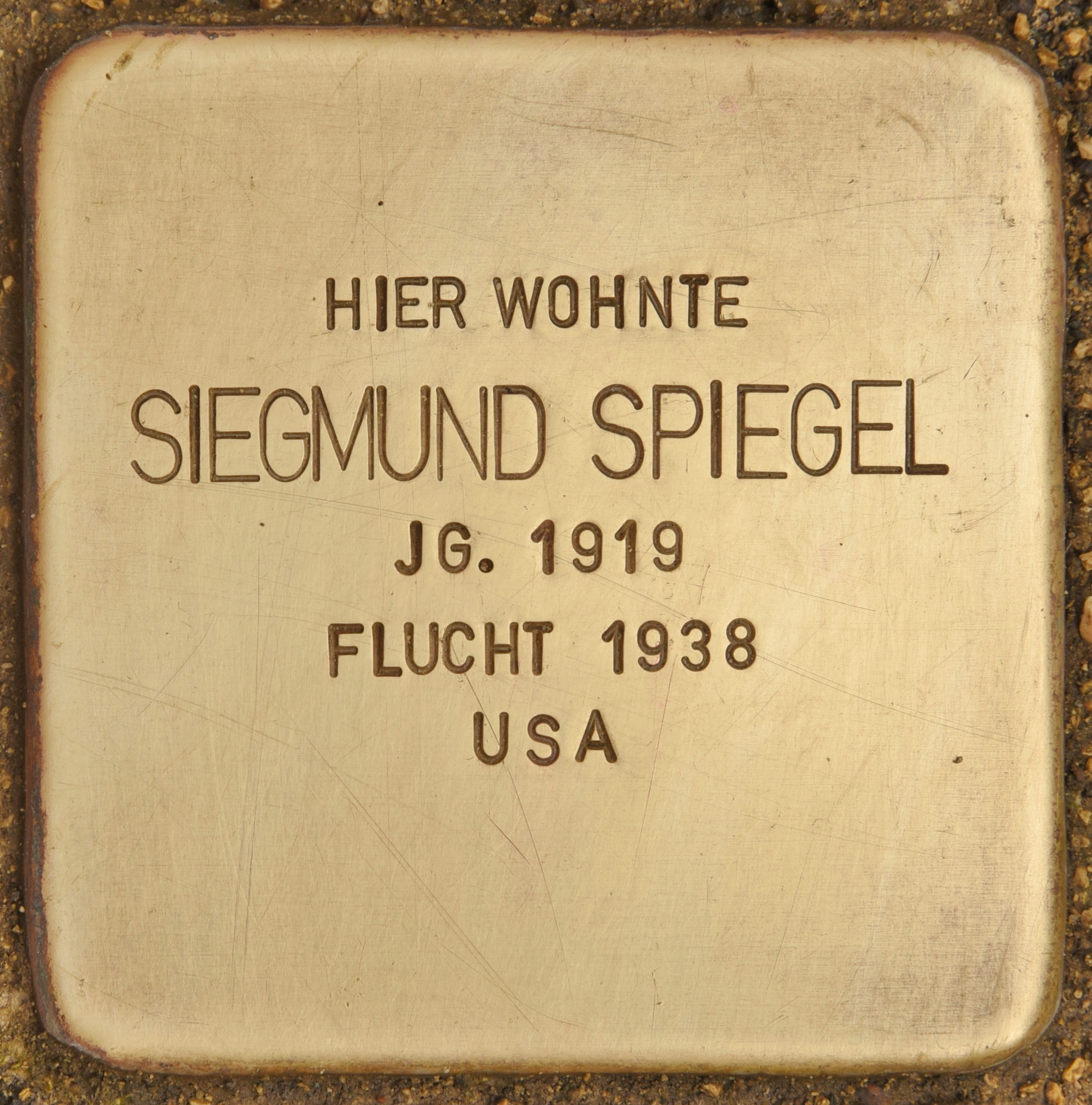
A Stolperstein in Gera, Germany, marking where Spiegel lived.

Siegmund Spiegel was born to Jacob and Sara Spiegel, who were German Jews, in Gera, Germany, on November 13, 1919. He was one of three children – all of whom escaped Nazi Germany and the Holocaust. When he was 14, he was expelled from school for being Jewish – and soon thereafter, his parents lost their business and jobs. In 1938, Spiegel followed his sister to the United States, settling in New York. His brother fled to Palestine, but his parents chose to stay in Germany, and ultimately were murdered in the Holocaust.

In 1941, during World War II, he volunteered to be drafted into the United States Army. He served in the 1st Infantry Division, serving in France, North Africa, and Sicily, eventually earning the ranks of Master Sergeant. He would receive a Purple Heart and Bronze Star for his heroism during the war – in addition to the Croix de-Guerre-Avec Palme and the Chevalier of the French Legion of Honor.

In the early 1960s, Spiegel designed Syosset Hospital in Syosset, New York; the hospital opened in 1962. He also designed an architecturally-significant, drum-shaped bank building in Albertson, New York, shortly thereafter. In the 1980s, Spiegel designed the relocated facilities for the Village of Freeport, New York's public works department.

Spiegel also designed a significant number of apartment complexes – and he would eventually begin specializing in designing them. Among the several complexes he designed were the Flower Hill Garden Apartments (in Flower Hill, New York), Bay Shore Gardens (in Bay Shore, New York), the Cameo House (in Hempstead, New York), and the Chalet Apartments (in Roslyn, New York). He also advocated for converting surplus school buildings into housing for middle class senior citizens. His private architectural practice was located in East Meadow, New York.

Spiegel was also a prolific Jewish activist and lecturer on the Holocaust, having lost both his parents in it; he was separated from them when the Nazis deported his mother and father to Poland from Germany around the time of Kristallnacht. He frequently wrote editorials and opinion pieces on architecture and Jewish activism in magazines and newspapers. Spiegel was also the co-founder of the Black-Jewish Coalition of Long Island and of the Nassau County Holocaust Commission, was President of the Long Island Regional Board of the Anti-Defamation League, and was the architect of Nassau County's Holocaust Memorial and Education Center at Eisenhower Park.

In 2012, Spiegel published an autobiography, titled D-Day Plus Seventy Years: A Wartime Odyssey.

Spiegel died in Florida on July 14, 2016, aged 96. He is buried at Arlington National Cemetery in Arlington County, Virginia.

=== Personal life ===
Siegmund Spiegel was married to his wife, Ruth – another German-born Jew who escaped Germany during the Holocaust; they met in New York City and wed on April 13, 1945. They had two daughters and lived for many years in East Meadow, New York, before retiring and relocating to Bal Harbour, Florida. For his activism and teachings on the Holocaust, Spiegel earned the New York State Board of Regents' Yavner Award in 1992, and was given an Honorary Doctor of Humane Letters by Hofstra University in 1993.

== Notable works ==
=== Architectural ===
- Syosset Hospital (Syosset, New York)

=== Literature ===
- D-Day Plus Seventy Years: A Wartime Odyssey (autobiography, 2012)

== See also ==
- Manoug Exerjian
- Emil V. Cianciulli
