= Brooklyn Free Clinic =

Free clinic in New York, United States

Anne Kastor Brooklyn Free Clinic
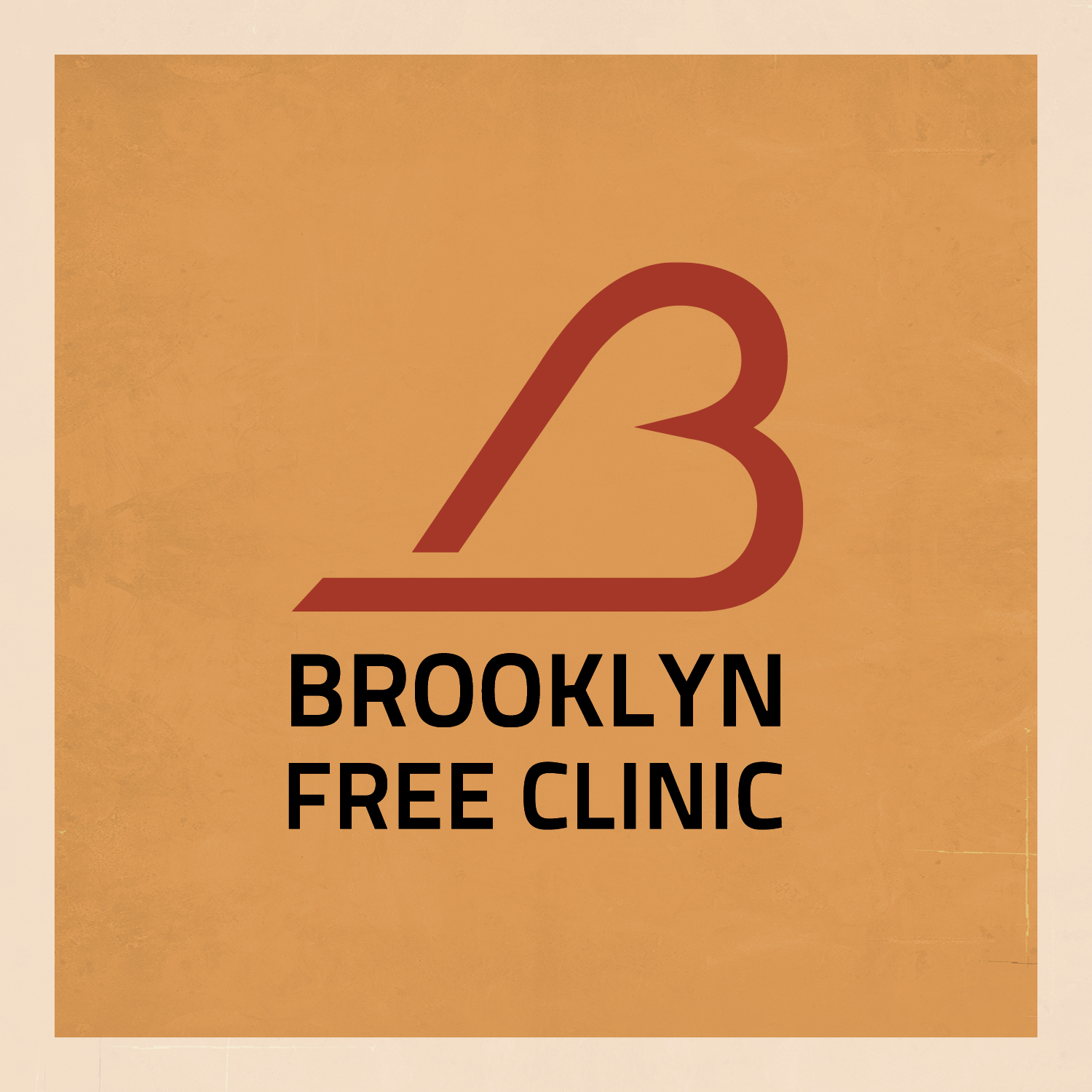
- BFC Logo
- Overview
Medical Director	Kaiser Islam M.D.
Service Model	Student-Run Free Clinic
Specialty	Primary Care
Affiliation	SUNY Downstate College of Medicine
Website	www.brooklynfreeclinic.org
- Location
City	New York City
Borough	Brooklyn
Neighborhood	East Flatbush

The Anne Kastor Brooklyn Free Clinic (Brooklyn Free Clinic or BFC) is a student run free clinic located in East Flatbush, Brooklyn, NY. Nearly all the positions from front desk administration and clinical volunteers to Executive Board are staffed by students from the various colleges of SUNY Downstate Medical Center.

== History ==
The Brooklyn Free Clinic (BFC) was formed in 2006 by a group of medical students at SUNY Downstate College of Medicine. Located in Central Brooklyn, an area whose surrounding neighborhoods have some of the highest rates of uninsurance in the City. The initial driving mission of the clinic was to serve these uninsured populations. After nearly two years of planning the clinic finally saw its first patients in 2008. One of the first volunteer attending physician was Dr. Anne Kastor, a primary care physician, SUNY Downstate College of Medicine faculty member and advocate for universal healthcare. So dedicated to the spirit of student run clinics, Dr. Kastor went on to become the Director of the Weil Cornell Community Clinic at Weil Cornell Medical College.

Initially located on Throop Avenue in Bedford Stuyvesant, the clinic moved its clinical operations to Lefferts Avenue in East Flatbush in 2014 while also expanding to meet the needs of the community. In January 2017, the clinic moved to University Hospital Brooklyn to better serve the needs of the community. The clinic currently operates on Wednesday nights throughout the year with few exceptions. The clinic uniquely takes a multi-disciplinary approach to clinic nights and various community-based events.

== Structure and committees ==
Volunteers at the BFC are students from SUNY Downstate College of Medicine, College of Health Related Professions, College of Nursing and School of Public Health. Volunteer attending physicians are mainly recruited from SUNY Downstate Medical Center, Kings County Hospital Center and other surrounding hospitals including Lenox Hill Hospital and North Shore University Hospital among others. The clinic operates every Wednesday night throughout the year from 5pm until the last patient is seen at around 10pm.

In addition to regular primary care clinical operations, the BFC also operates several specialized committees targeted towards onsite clinical operations including programs for triage, screening high-risk persons, patient education, physical and occupational therapy and psychiatry among others. The BFC not only serves in a clinical capacity but focuses on outreach and community involvement and is thus made up of several committees which aim to serve the community as a community-based organization engaged in public health efforts. These services are compartmentalized into various committees - each committee is a multi-disciplinary effort aimed at both quality patient care and education.

=== Women's Health ===
In January 2014, the BFC started Women's Health Night which serves to provide primary care gynecology and other women's health concerns including gynecologic physical examinations, routine Pap smears, STD testing and breast exams. A partnership was formed between students, faculty and ACOG and training was developed to train students in delivering competent care to meet women's primary health needs. Training is aimed at enhancing student's knowledge and competence of gynecologic issues through didactic lectures and simulation.

=== RISE ===
Formally known as Routine Intervention through Screening and Education, the RISE program is a comprehensive HIV and HCV counseling service which trains volunteers in culturally competent HIV and HCV counseling, syringe exchange counseling and various harm reduction programs which take place during normal clinical nights but also operates with full mobility within the clinic and community.

The program was started as a partnership between the BFC and the HEAT (Health and Education Alternatives for Teens) Program, a comprehensive care service for at-risk youth affected by HIV in addition to comprehensive transgender services. Initially the program aimed only at counseling and testing for HIV in the clinic and at various community events but expanded to include Hepatitis C virus counseling and testing in partnership with the New York City Department of Health and Mental Hygiene and most recently started a harm reduction program aimed at syringe exchange in at-risk communities in Brooklyn and Greater New York City.

=== Referrals ===
Because the BFC is mainly a center for primary care with limited secondary services. The referrals establish the bridge for care between the primary and tertiary care. Allowing patients access to specialized doctors and services.

=== Nursing ===
The Nursing Committee serves as the point of entrance for all nursing students and nurse preceptors. On clinic nights, nursing students serve to triage all incoming patients, present walk-in patients, take vitals, administer vaccinations and other treatments. The interaction with medical teams serves to foster a multidisciplinary approach to medical care that is often not emphasized in medical and nursing education.

Nursing volunteers are not limited to the Nursing Committee but take part in a variety of other committees based on interest and expertise.

=== Emergency response ===
Responsible for clinic mobilization in case of natural or man made disaster. The planning by the Emergency Response committee allowed the mobilization of BFC operations to Red Hook, Brooklyn and Rockaway, New York in the wake of Hurricane Sandy to offer medical relief.

=== Other committees ===
Other committees include Community Outreach, Public Health, Patient Education, Pharmacy, Research, Quality Improvement, Social Work, Finance and Information Technology. Each serves a distinctive roll and provides necessary services to allow for a fully functional clinic both on-site and in the community.

== Awards and recognition ==
The clinic has won multiple awards for its advertisement campaigns including a gold medal in conjunction with CDMiConnect at the 2014 MMM Awards for their "We Need U" campaign and a bronze medal at the CLIO Healthcare Awards.

The clinic hosts an annual conference on health seen through the eyes of medicine, art, technology and community called BFC What's Next. The clinic has won multiple awards for its advertisement campaigns including a gold medal in conjunction with CDMiConnect at the 2014 MMM Awards for their "We Need U" campaign and a bronze medal at the CLIO Healthcare Awards.

Annually, volunteers of the BFC run the Brooklyn Half Marathon and the New York City Marathon to raise both funds and awareness for the clinic.
