= Henri Tiedge =

American neurologist

Henri Tiedge is an American neurologist, and as of May 2015, a SUNY Distinguished Professor at SUNY Downstate Medical Center, State University of New York.
