= Long Island Jewish Forest Hills =

- Northwell Health
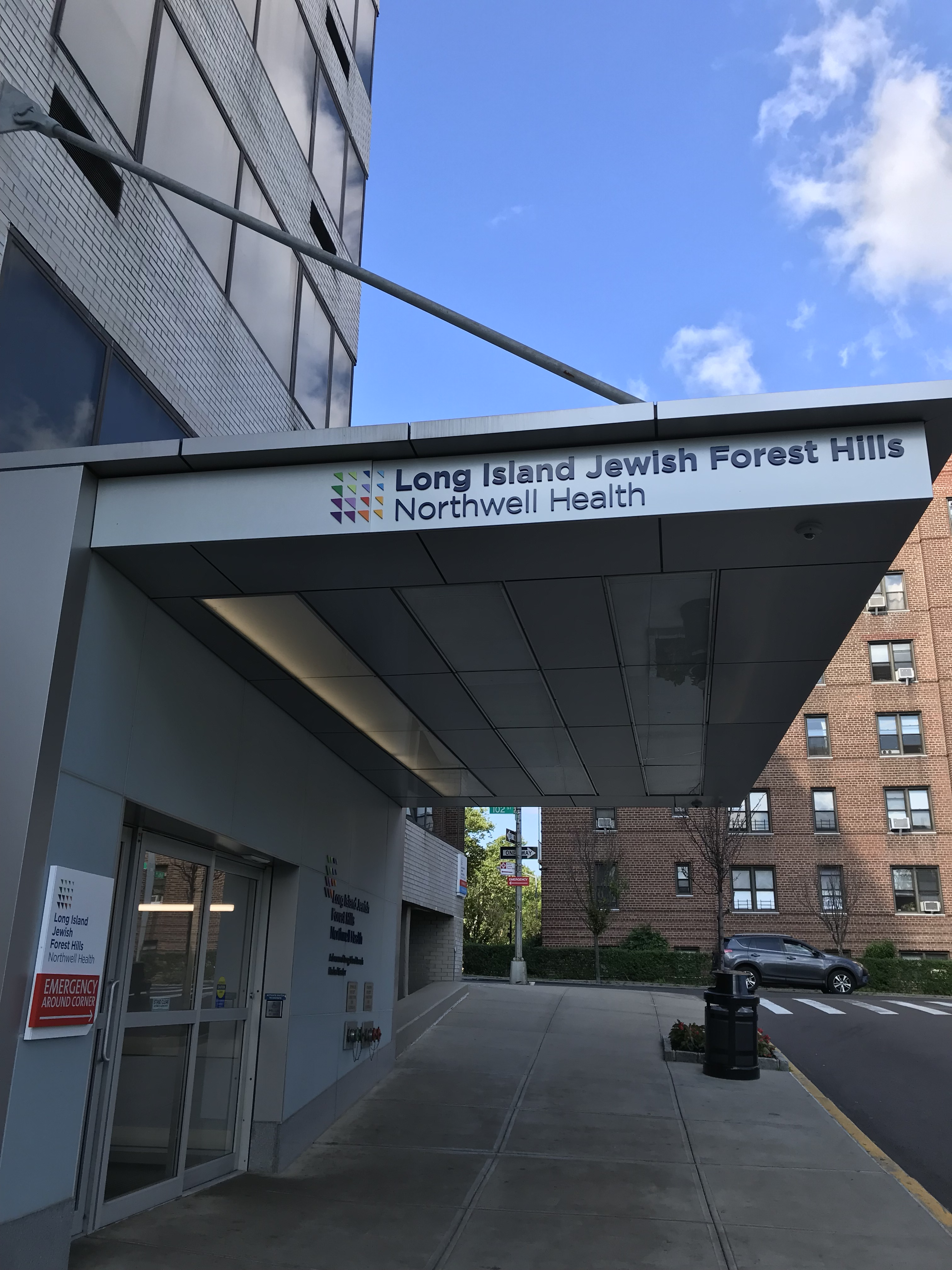
- 66th Avenue entrance of Long Island Jewish Forest Hills

Geography
- Location: 102-01 66th Road Forest Hills, New York City, New York, United States
- Coordinates: 40.729096°N 73.851439°W

Organization
- Care system: Private
- Affiliated university: Hofstra Northwell School of Medicine

Services
- Emergency department: Yes
- Beds: 312

History
- Founded: 1953

Links
- Website: Official website
- Lists: Hospitals in New York State
- Other links: Hospitals in Queens

Long Island Jewish Forest Hills (often called simply LIJ Forest Hills) is a community and teaching hospital operating under the Northwell Health hospital network. It is located in Forest Hills, Queens, New York. The hospital is affiliated with the Donald and Barbara Zucker School of Medicine at Hofstra/Northwell, which sponsors a residency program in internal medicine. The hospital also serves as the host of a podiatry residency program.

== History ==
The hospital first opened on August 13, 1953, as Forest Hills General Hospital. In May 1963, the Queens District Attorney opened an investigation into the finances of the institution after a former employee reported that the administration of the hospital was involved in a Blue Cross billing scheme. The scandal led to the hospital's closure in November 1963. In 1964, the hospital reopened as LaGuardia Hospital, now under the management of HIP. It was later acquired by the North Shore health system in 1996 and renamed North Shore University Hospital at Forest Hills. In 2006, the hospital was renamed Forest Hills Hospital.

In 2016, Northwell Health announced that that state of New York had approved a request to merge the hospital with Long Island Jewish Valley Stream and run both facilities as divisions of the larger Long Island Jewish Medical Center in Glen Oaks. The hospital was subsequently renamed Long Island Jewish Forest Hills.

== Services ==
The hospital currently manages 312 beds and offers general inpatient medical, surgical, intensive care, obstetrics and gynecological services. LIJ Forest Hills is a certified heart station, New York State designated Primary Stroke Center and Level II Perinatal Center. In 2017, the hospital reported 16,500 inpatient discharges, over 2,000 baby deliveries, and over 50,000 Emergency Department visits.

== LaGuardia Hospital ==
LaGuardia Hospital (named for Fiorello H. La Guardia) was an interim name under which the hospital operated from 1964 through 1996. During those years, it was managed by HIP.

== See also ==
- List of hospitals in Queens
- Long Island Jewish Medical Center
- Long Island Jewish Valley Stream
