= SUNY Downstate Health Sciences University =

Public medical school in New York City, New York, US

- Other names: Downstate Health Science University; SUNY Downstate
- Former names: Long Island College of Medicine (1860–1950); State University Medical Center at New York City (1950–1960); Downstate Medical Center (1960–1986); SUNY Health Science Center at Brooklyn (1986–2019)
- Motto: To Learn, To Search, To Serve
- Type: Public medical school
- Established: 1860
- Affiliations: State University of New York; SUNY Downstate Medical Center
- Dean: F. Charles Brunicardi
- Students: 2,259 (fall 2025)
- Undergraduates: 288 (fall 2025)
- Postgraduates: 1,971 (fall 2025)
- Location: Brooklyn, New York, United States; 40.6554°N 73.9457°W
- Campus: Urban
- Website: www.downstate.edu

The State University of New York Downstate Health Sciences University (SUNY Downstate Health Sciences University, formerly the State University of New York Health Science Center at Brooklyn) is a public medical school in Brooklyn, New York City. The university includes the College of Medicine, College of Nursing, School of Health Professions, School of Graduate Studies, and School of Public Health.

== History ==
SUNY Downstate Health Sciences University is a public medical school and academic medical center in Brooklyn, New York. SUNY Downstate Health Sciences University was founded in 1860 as the Long Island College of Medicine, a division of Long Island College Hospital which had been established in 1858. Its school of nursing was established in 1883. During the Spanish–American War, the college was used to treat sick and wounded soldiers.

When the Flexner Report was released in 1910, LICM received a "B" rating. After instituting the changes recommended in the Flexner Report, the college was recognized with an "A" rating by the American Medical Association in 1914.

In 1948, the State University of New York (SUNY) was created and conducted a study of existing medical schools. On April 5, 1950, the Long Island College of Medicine was merged into SUNY, forming the State University Medical Center at New York City. Around 1954, it began using the nickname Downstate Medical Center; this became its official name in 1960.

The college was renamed State University of New York Health Science Center at Brooklyn (SUNY HSCB) in 1986. Despite this name change, the instituiton continued to be known as Downstate Medical Center. Because of this, its name was changed to the State University of New York Downstate Health Sciences University on June 20, 2019. The updated name incorporated "university" to better reflect the degrees it offers.

== Campus ==
The College of Medicine is located at 450 Clarkson Avenue in Brooklyn, New York. Most of the preclinical learning activities take place in the Health Sciences Education Building located at 395 Lenox Road.

In clinical years, students rotate at several different hospitals, including:

- SUNY Downstate Medical Center (in-house)
- Kings County Hospital (in-house)
- Downstate at Bay Ridge (in-house)
- Brooklyn Veterans Administration Hospital
- Lenox Hill Hospital
- North Shore University Hospital
- Staten Island University Hospital
- Maimonides Medical Center

== Academics ==
Downstate Health Sciences University comprises a College of Medicine, a School of Public Health, a College of Nursing, a School of Health Professions, and a School of Graduate Studies.

It also includes a major research complex and biotechnology facilities.

It offers a Bachelors, Masters, MD, PhD, DPH, and DPT degrees. The college of medicine offers several pathways to graduation including joint degree programs and special tracks including MD/Ph.D., MD/MPH, MD Medical Educators Pathway, MD Clinical Neuroscience Pathway, and MD Global Health Pathway.

=== Students ===
In the fall of, the university had 2,204 students, with 286 undergraduates and 1,918 graduates. As of fall 2018, it had approximately 8,000 faculty and staff. In 2015, SUNY Downstate students matched to almost 18% of all offered EM/IM combined residency positions. 26 additional students matched to emergency medicine programs at institution including UCLA and the University of Pittsburgh.

=== College of Medicine admissions ===
The 2018 entering class averaged an undergraduate GPA of 3.74 and an MCAT of 514. In the same cycle, 5390 prospective students applied for 203 spots in the first-year class.

== Student activities ==
Clubs and societies at SUNY Downstate are not limited to the college of medicine but also involve the other schools at SUNY Downstate. Clubs are tailored to a diverse range of interests, including human rights, music, ethnic dialogues, ethics, specialty interest groups, and global health, among many other things. A chapter of Sigma Xi has operated on campus since 1969; there is also a chapter of Alpha Omega Alpha.

The Anne Kastor Brooklyn Free Clinic (BFC) is a student-run free clinic that offers care and health maintenance screening to the uninsured populations of Brooklyn. Students also volunteer through the Arthur Ashe Institute for Urban Health in partnership with the university. In partnership with the John Conley Division of Medical Ethics and Humanities at the medical center, the Downstate Ethics Society aims to expose students to ethical issues surrounding all aspects of health care.

== Controversies ==
In 2013, SUNY Downstate released a court-ordered financial audit, which found the institution in need of capital funds, citing large losses from 2007 through 2011. The audit cited bloated salaries for top administrators, underuse, and poor financial decisions as contributing to the losses.

In January 2020, two SUNY Downstate surgeons filed lawsuits accusing the medical center of retaliation against them for reporting patient safety and death concerns in the heart-surgery and organ-transplant programs. Before the complaint, the institution paused these two programs in July 2019 due to pressure from the New York State Department of Health and the United Network for Organ Sharing when reviewers found issues in the programs and recommended a more extensive review in hopes to remediate the problems.
