= Phelps Hospital =

- Northwell Health

Geography
- Location: 701 North Broadway, Sleepy Hollow 10591, New York, United States
- Coordinates: 41°06′32.4″N 73°51′47.6″W

Organization
- Type: General

Services
- Standards: Joint Commission
- Beds: 238 (since 2018)

Links
- Website: phelpshospital.org
- Lists: Hospitals in New York State

Phelps Hospital, previously known as Phelps Memorial Hospital Center, is a general hospital located in Sleepy Hollow, New York, and a member of the Northwell Health system. As of 2018, the hospital comprises 238 beds on its 69-acre (28-hectare) campus. It was founded in 1955 to accommodate the need for a hospital larger than the pre-existing Tarrytown Hospital.
