= Long Island Jewish Valley Stream =

- Northwell Health

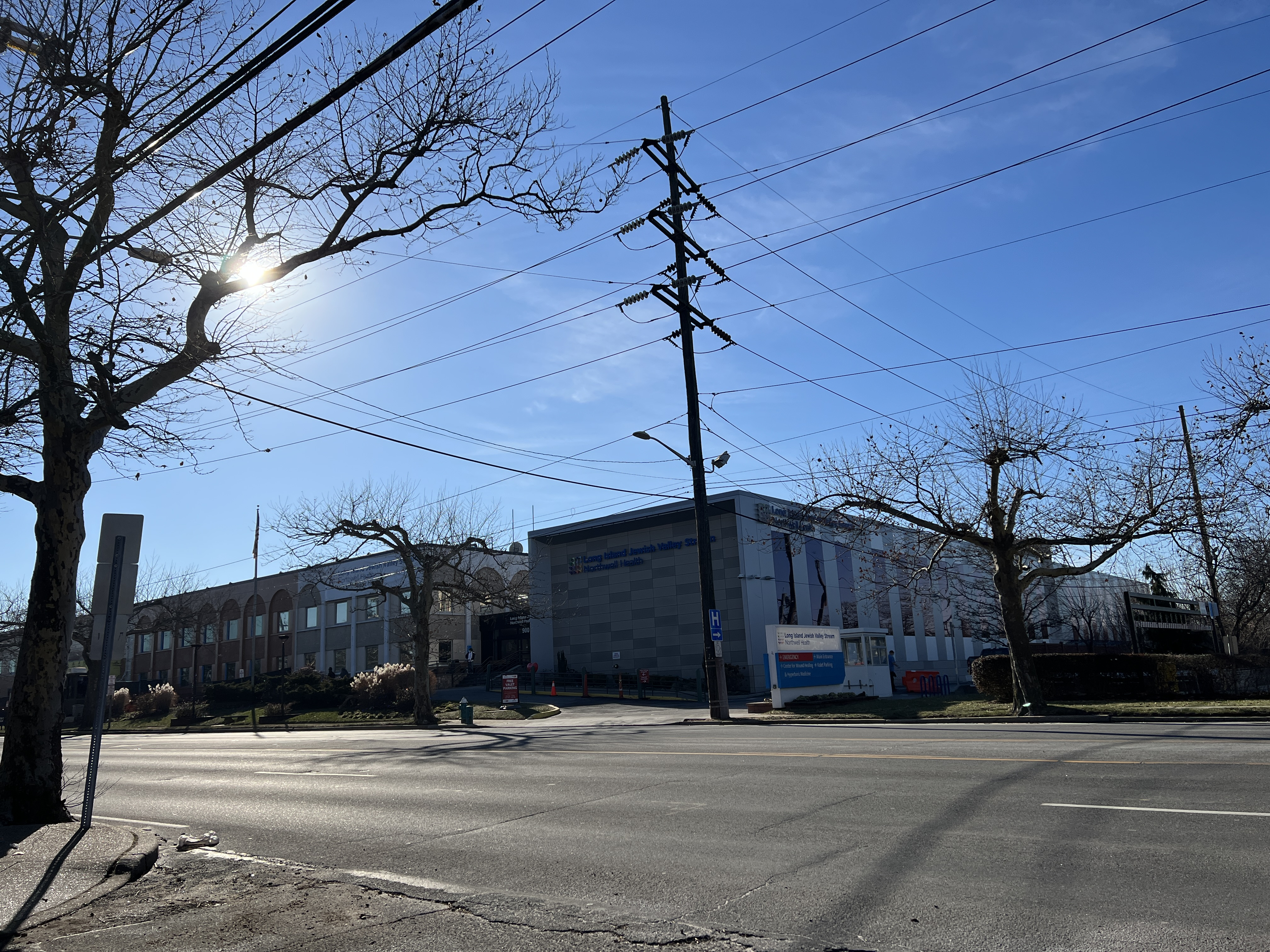
- Long Island Jewish Valley Stream Hospital in 2022

Geography
- Location: 900 Franklin Avenue; North Valley Stream, New York, United States
- Coordinates: 40°40′52″N 73°41′11″W

Organization
- Type: Short Term Acute Care
- Affiliated university: Zucker School of Medicine

Services
- Emergency department: Yes
- Beds: 337

History
- Former names: Franklin Hospital; Franklin General Hospital; franklin Hospital Medical Center
- Opened: 1963

Links
- Website: valleystream.northwell.edu
- Lists: Hospitals in New York State

Long Island Jewish Valley Stream (often abbreviated as LIJVS or simply called LIJ Valley Stream and was historically known as Franklin Hospital, Franklin Hospital Medical Center, and Franklin General Hospital), is a short term acute care hospital located in North Valley Stream, New York. The hospital has 337 beds and is affiliated the Donald and Barbara Zucker School of Medicine at Hofstra/Northwell. The hospital is a member of Northwell Health.

== History ==
The hospital was founded as Franklin Hospital in 1963, which upon opening had 146 beds. It eventually merged with Long Island Jewish Hospital (part of Northwell Health), becoming Long Island Jewish Valley Stream Hospital.

In 1975, the hospital planned on construction $3 million (1975 USD) expansion project, which sparked significant community opposition. Citing the local pushback, the Town of Hempstead blocked the hospital's plans. New plans would eventually be made, and were ultimately approved.

In 1989, the hospital's name changed from Franklin General Hospital to Franklin Hospital Medical Center, after the facility underwent a major expansion – including the creation of a skilled nursing center.

In December 1991, Franklin Hospital Medical Center signed an agreement to become affiliated with New York University Hospital.

In 2016, Northwell Health announced that that state of New York had approved a request to merge the hospital with Long Island Jewish Forest Hills and run both as divisions of Long Island Jewish Medical Center in Glen Oaks.

In 2019, Northwell Health opened The Orthopedic Hospital at Long Island Jewish Valley Stream – a 9,761-square-foot (906.8 m^{2}) facility with 18 patient rooms, located on the second floor of the hospital. The late 2010s also saw the addition of a new emergency department at the hospital.

In early 2024, citing the need for improved pay, pensions, and working conditions, nurses at Long Island Jewish Valley Stream proposed going on strike, as Northwell Health had neglected to address these concerns when brought to their attention. In late February, Northwell Health and the union representing its nurses reached a deal, and the strike was ultimately averted.

== See also ==
- Long Island Jewish Medical Center
- Long Island Jewish Forest Hills
