= South Shore University Hospital =

- Northwell Health

Geography
- Location: 301 East Main Street, Bay Shore, New York, United States
- Coordinates: 40°43′33″N 73°14′27″W

Organisation
- Care system: Private
- Type: General
- Affiliated university: Zucker School of Medicine

Services
- Emergency department: Level I Trauma Center
- Beds: 335

Helipads
- Helipad: Yes

History
- Founded: 1911

Links
- Website: ssuh.northwell.edu

South Shore University Hospital (formerly Southside Hospital) is a teaching hospital located in Bay Shore, New York, and is part of the Northwell Health system. It serves as a major regional healthcare provider in Suffolk County.

== Services ==
The hospital also serves as a teaching facility with graduate medical education programs, including anesthesiology, emergency medicine, internal medicine, maternal fetal medicine, urogynecology, and obstetrics and gynecology.

=== Designations ===
- ACS verified Level 1 Trauma Center
- Comprehensive Stroke Center
- Level II Perinatal Center

== Expansion ==
In recent years, the hospital began a major $500 million campus transformation. Key projects include:

- A new Women & Infants Center
- A six-story, 190,000-square-foot inpatient pavilion with 90 private rooms and 10 operating rooms (expected completion in 2026)

== Philanthropy ==
In 2021, the hospital received its largest gift in history from the Entenmann family, known for their Entenmann's bakery business. In recognition, the hospital campus was renamed the Entenmann Family Campus at South Shore University Hospital.

== Transportation ==
The hospital is accessible via New York State Route 27A (Main Street) and Sunrise Highway. It is near the Bay Shore station of the Long Island Rail Road and ferry services to Fire Island.

== See also ==
- Northwell Health
- Bay Shore, New York
- List of hospitals in New York (state)
