= Northern Westchester Hospital =

- Northwell Health

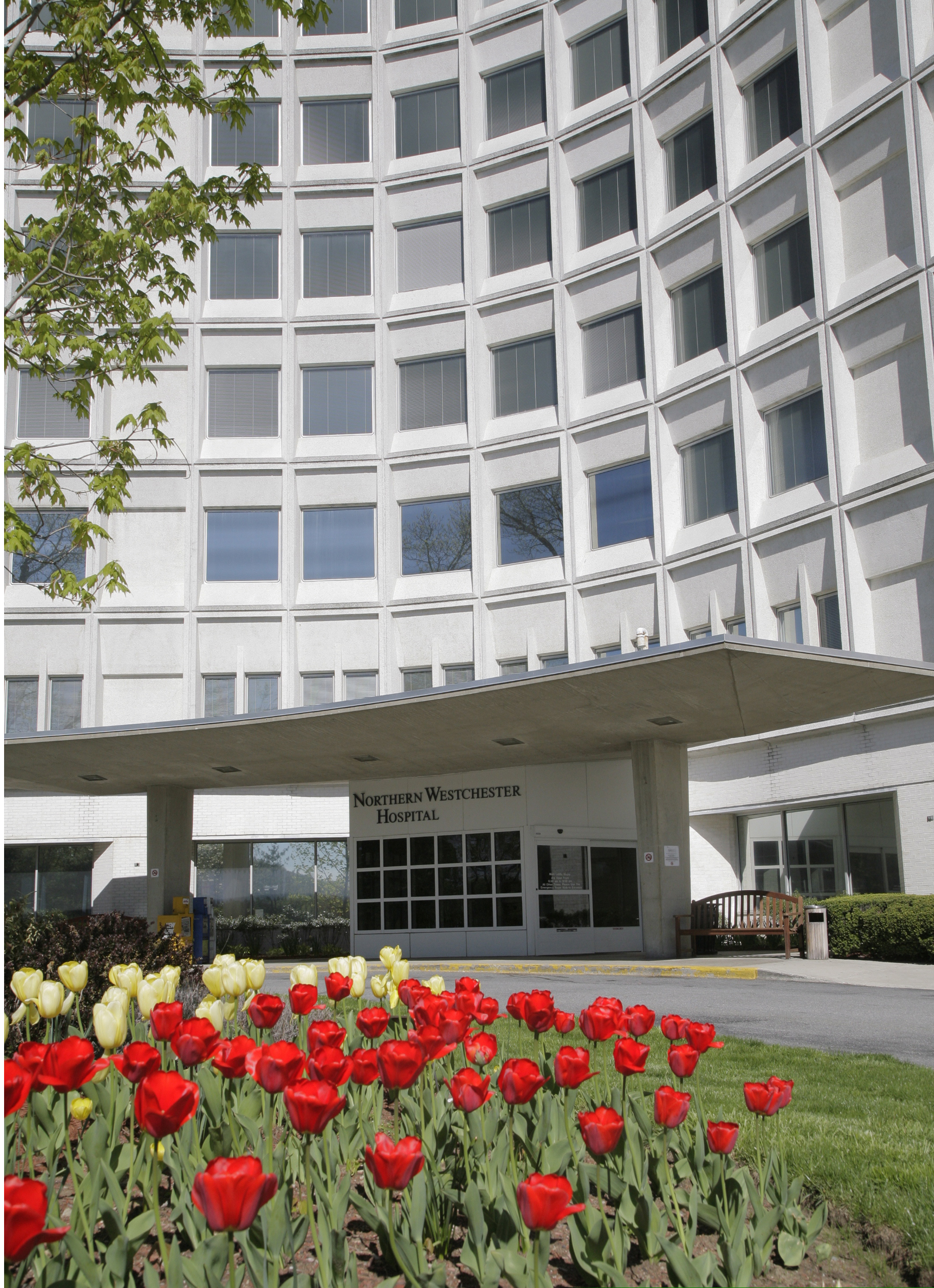
- Main entrance

Geography
- Location: 400 East Main Street, Mount Kisco, New York, United States
- Coordinates: 41°11′48″N 73°43′32″W

Organization
- Care system: Nonprofit
- Type: General
- Affiliated university: Donald and Barbara Zucker School of Medicine at Hofstra/Northwell

Services
- Beds: 245

History
- Founded: 1916

Links
- Website: nwh.northwell.edu
- Lists: Hospitals in New York State

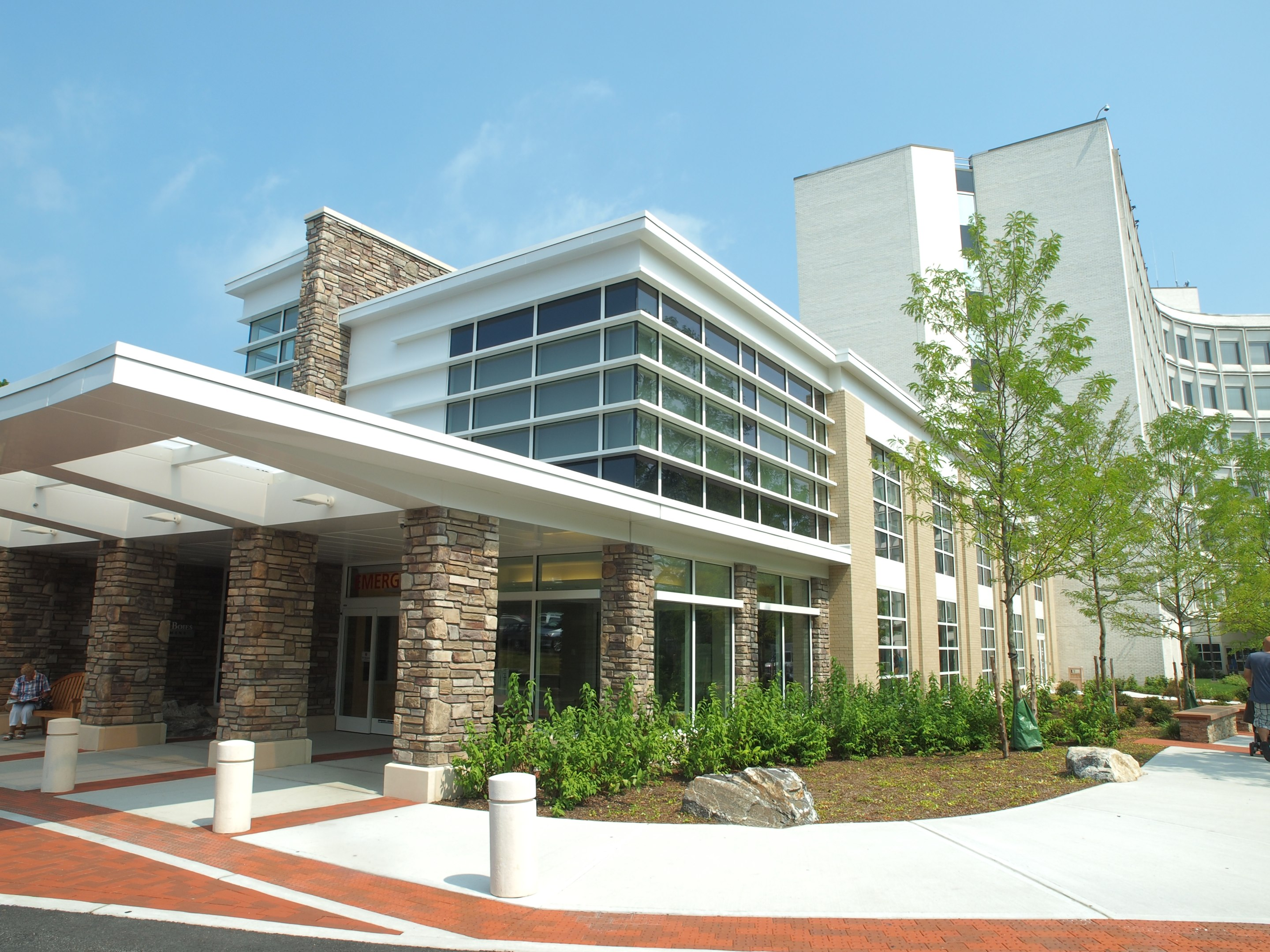
Northern Westchester Hospital emergency department

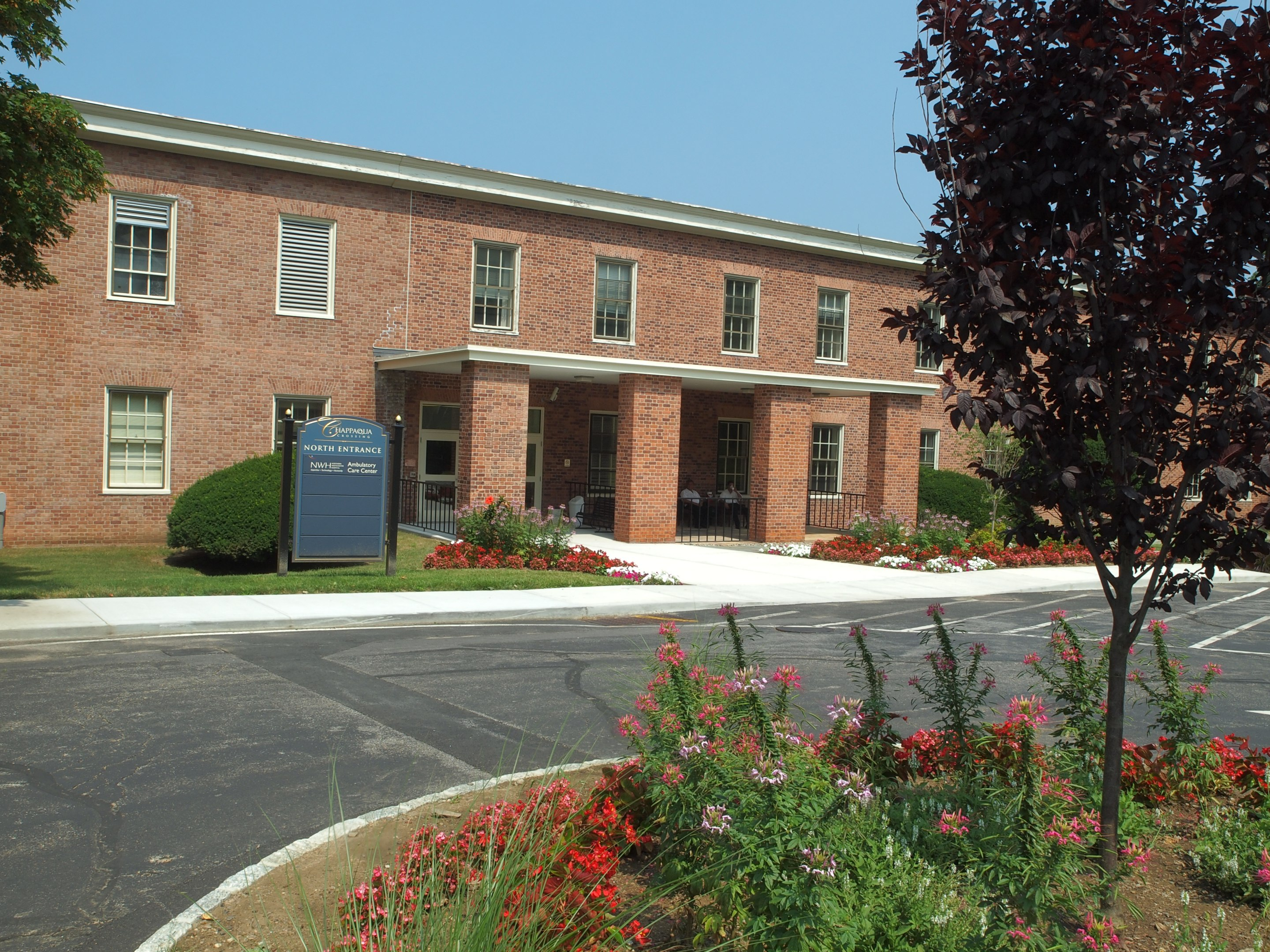
Northern Westchester Hospital at Chappaqua Crossing in Chappaqua, New York

Northern Westchester Hospital (NWH) is a not-for-profit, 245-bed, all-private-room facility in Mount Kisco, New York. Founded in 1916, it serves residents of Northern Westchester, Putnam County and southern Dutchess County, as well as parts of Fairfield County, Connecticut. It is owned by Northwell Health.

With more than 700 physicians, the hospital provides a wide range of patient-centered services through its emergency department, Women's Imaging Center, Cancer Treatment and Wellness Center, Level III Neonatal Intensive Care Unit (NICU), clinical trials program, and Gamma Knife center. NWH is a designated training and case observation center for the da Vinci Surgical System in colorectal surgery. NWH breast surgeons provide microvascular surgery using the Novadaq SPY Imaging System. A number of bariatric surgical procedures are performed, including a modified bariatric technique known as stomach intestinal pylorus-sparing surgery (SIPS).

== History ==
In the early 20th century, a committee composed of William Sloane, Moses Taylor, Joseph C. Baldwin, Jr., Edwin G. Merrill, John Henry Towne, Winthrop Cowdin, Cornelius R. Agnew and Hiram E. Manville was set up to organize the creation of a new hospital to serve northern Westchester County. On May 8, 1916, the first Northern Westchester Hospital (NWH) meeting was held, at which the hospital's first president, William Sloane, and first board of directors, were elected. The facility opened its doors in 1916, with six primary physicians and 15 beds - filling 12 of them its first day. Erected on a 2.5-acre parcel of land, NWH immediately proved a vital part of the community.

In the early 1920s the population of Westchester County and adjacent upstate New York swelled. In response, the hospital expanded to 50-rooms in April 1925, and, demonstrating its continual evolution to meet the needs of an ever more sophisticated healthcare system, added a state-of-the-art radiology facility. As the community continued to grow, a new construction initiative commenced in 1958, adding 89 new beds in a three-story wing by 1961. Two decades later the hospital opened the DeWitt Wallace Pavilion, bringing it to a total of 259 beds in 1973 and allowing NWH to enter a new age of patient-centered care. Following the expansion, the hospital would narrow its focus to acquiring the latest technology to better serve the community and region. In 1989 capability for magnetic resonance imaging (MRI) and digital subtraction angiography (DSA) was introduced.

Northern Westchester Hospital joined the North Shore-LIJ Health System in January 2015. The health system is now known as Northwell Health. NWH modernized its surgical services facility in April 2016 to include six new operating rooms and 13 private pre- and post-anesthesia care beds.

The hospital celebrated its centennial year in 2016 with various community and staff events, such as partnerships with area historical societies, community walks, Board of Trustees and neo-natal intensive care unit reunions and employee and community galas.

On September 2, 2020, Northern Westchester Hospital opened its cardiac catheterization lab, part of the Seema Boesky Heart Center. Actor Christopher Reeve died in 2004 at the age of 52.

== Medical specialties ==
As a comprehensive acute-care hospital, NWH provides patient-center care in the following services:

- Orthopedic and Spine Institute: The Orthopedic and Spine Institute is also an active user of anterior hip replacement.
- The Breast Care Center: Provides a multidisciplinary approach to the surgical treatment of breast cancer. This approach is referred to as "aesthetic oncology" by the Breast Care Center, and it combines breast-cancer surgery with breast-reconstruction surgery. This includes the use of intraoperative radiotherapy (IORT), microvascular surgery for breast conservation, nipple sparing and DIEP Flap or PAP Flap procedures, Gamma Knife for metastatic brain cancer and Novalis stereotactic radiosurgery for other tumors.
- Cancer Treatment and Wellness Center: For those receiving chemotherapy, infusion services, radiation therapy and gamma knife procedures.
- Clinical Trials Program: Offering treatments and clinical trials in bariatric surgery, brain tumors, breast cancer, lung cancer, lymphoma, prostate cancer and strokes.
- Surgical Weight Loss: Offers laparoscopic lap band, gastric bypass and gastric sleeve surgery. NWH bariatric surgeons perform duodenal switch and revision surgeries. Screening and preparatory tests prior to surgery include psychological evaluation, dietician evaluation, upper gastrointestinal testing (UGI), esophagogastroduodenoscopy (EGD) and electrocardiogram (EKG).
- Institute for Robotic and Minimally Invasive Surgery: NWH uses the da Vinci Surgical System to treat a wide range of conditions across numerous disciplines including urology, gynecology, gynecologic oncology and general surgery.
- Cardio-Pulmonary Rehabilitation: Structured rehabilitation designed to manage a wide range of existing conditions for smokers and ex-smokers and those who have chronic obstructive pulmonary disease (COPD), emphysema, asthma, pulmonary fibrosis, interstitial lung disease, bronchiectasis, and cystic fibrosis.
- Wound Care & Hyperbaric Medicine: Providing wound care for chronic non-healing wounds related to various conditions such as diabetes and obesity, post-surgical non-healing wounds and traumatic wounds. Therapies available to patients include hyperbaric oxygen therapy (HBOT), provided in a multi-seat hyperbaric chamber. HBOT is not only prescribed for patients with wounds, such as diabetic foot ulcers or venous ulcers, but is also an effective treatment for such conditions as delayed radiation injury, compromised grafts and flaps, necrotizing soft tissue infections, intracranial abscess and severe anemia.
- Radiology & Medical Imaging: NWH uses digital imaging techniques to provide accurate test results including MRI, PET/CT scans, CAT scans, ultrasounds and digital X-rays.
- Stereotactic Radiosurgery: Offering both the Gamma Knife and the Novalis radiosurgery program for the treatment of trigeminal neuralgia, acoustic neuroma, pituitary adenoma, metastatic brain tumors, meningioma and vascular malformation.
- Plastic Surgery: Performs cosmetic surgery such as facelifts, eyelid surgery and rhinoplasty, breast lift, breast augmentation and body contouring, which includes liposuction, abdominoplasty and skin lifting following weight loss surgery. NWH also performs reconstructive procedures that include breast reconstruction, breast reduction, skin cancer removal and reconstruction after Mohs surgery.
