= Emil Cianciulli =

American lawyer and businessman (1930–2019)

- Born: Emil V. Cianciulli; 1930
- Died: October 2019 (aged 88–89)
- Burial place: Calverton National Cemetery, Calverton, New York
- Education: Hofstra University; Fordham University
- Occupations: Businessman; lawyer
- Spouse: Clare Knowles
- Children: 2

Emil V. "Al" Cianciulli (1930–2019) was an American lawyer, businessman, civil rights advocate, and Korean War veteran who also served as the chairman of Hofstra University's Board of Trustees.

== Life and career ==
=== Education ===
Cianciulli graduated from Hofstra University in 1952. He then earned his PhD from Fordham University.

=== Career ===
==== Military service ====
Cianciulli served in the Korean War with the United States Army, and earned a Bronze Star for his service.

==== Law ====
Cianculli would help establish the law firm of Suozzi, English & Cianciulli, which is now named Meyer, Suozzi, English & Klein; he had also served as its president and chief executive.

Eventually, Cianciulli would also help establish the firm of Cianciulli & Meng.

==== Island Helicopter ====
In 1984, Cianciulli became the president and chief executive of Island Helicopter after previously serving as its vice chairman.

==== Hofstra University ====
Cianciulli served on Hofstra University's board of trustees between 1972 and 1986, and also served on Hofstra's legal counsel. He originally served as a secretary, eventually becoming its vice-chairman and ultimately its chairman.

Additionally, Cianciulli won several awards from Hofstra – including its Presidential Medal. He also created the school's Emil V. Cianciulli Endowed Scholarship.

==== Involvement with hospitals ====
Cianciulli served as an associate trustee for both North Shore University Hospital and St. Francis Hospital.

=== Civil rights advocacy ===
Cianciulli was a vocal advocate for civil rights and social justice, and was awarded by the Long Island Chapter of the National Conference of Christians and Jews.

== Death ==
Cianciulli died in October 2019. He is buried at Calverton National Cemetery in Calverton, New York.

He was survived by his wife, Clare Knowles, his daughter, Valery Smith, three grandchildren, and a great-grandchild, Emily. He was predeceased by his son, Christopher.

Flags at Hofstra were flown at half-mast following Cianciulli's death.

== Personal life ==
Cianciulli lived in Flower Hill, New York.

== See also ==
- Harold Miller (naval officer)
- John W. Walter
