= North Shore University Hospital =

- Northwell Health

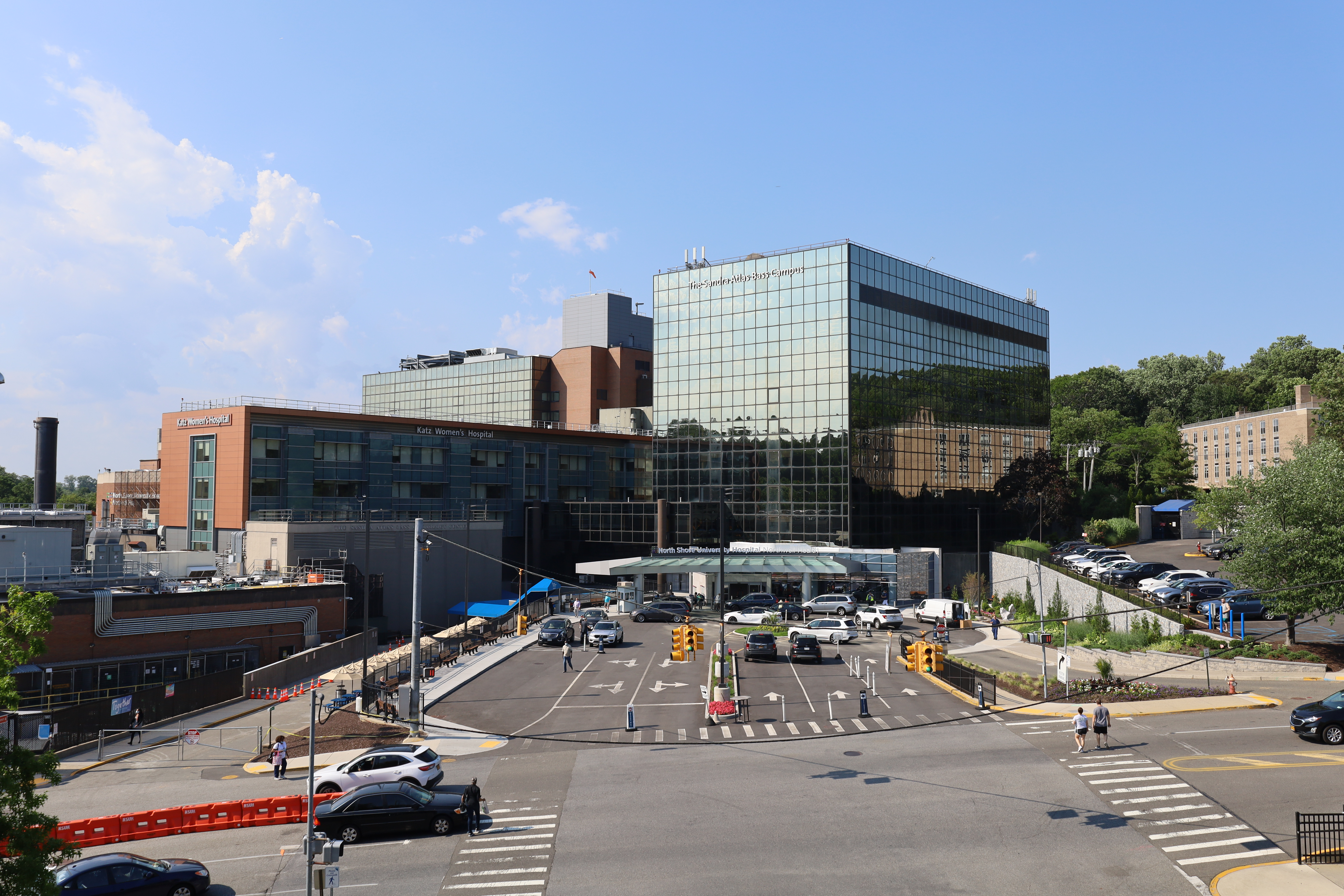
- North Shore University Hospital

Geography
- Location: 300 Community Dr., Manhasset, New York, United States
- Coordinates: 40°46′39″N 73°42′06″W

Organization
- Care system: Non-profit Hospital
- Type: Teaching
- Affiliated university: Zucker School of Medicine

Services
- Emergency department: Level I Trauma Center
- Beds: 806

Helipads
- Helipad: (FAA LID: 7NY3) (FAA LID: 6NK3)
Number	Length		Surface
Number	ft	m	Surface
H1	64 × 64	20 × 20	aluminum
H2	60 × 60	18 × 18	concrete

History
- Founded: July 27, 1953

Links
- Website: http://www.northwell.edu
- Lists: Hospitals in New York State

North Shore University Hospital (formerly known as North Shore Hospital) is a teaching hospital in Manhasset, New York, in Nassau County, on Long Island. It is part of Northwell Health and is one of two primary teaching hospitals for the Zucker School of Medicine, alongside Long Island Jewish Medical Center, offering residency programs, postgraduate training programs and clinical fellowships.

North Shore University Hospital is a Level I Trauma Center, has 806 beds and has a staff of approximately 7,000. The hospital is considered the flagship quaternary care facility of the Northwell system and as such offers care in all medical specialties, including cardiovascular services, cancer care, orthopedics, maternal-fetal medicine and women's health services.

The hospital offers extensive neuroscience capabilities, including the Harvey Cushing Institutes of Neuroscience. These include the Chiari Institute, Movement Disorders Institute, Brain Tumor Institute, Brain Aneurysm Center, Headache Center, and Spine Center as well as a designated stroke center. In 2015, the hospital was the first on Long Island to become a comprehensive stroke center.

The campus is home to the Feinstein Institutes for Medical Research. The campus also contains the Sandra Bass Heart Hospital and Sandra Atlas Bass center for liver diseases. North Shore is an adult transplant center and operates heart, lung, liver, kidney and pancreas transplant programs.

== History ==
=== The hospital ===
North Shore Hospital was built on 12 acres (4.9 ha) of land donated by John Hay Whitney in 1949; another five acres were donated in 1955. The ceremony was held on May 6, 1951 and televised live by NBC. The hospital opened on July 27, 1953, with 169 beds, 253 doctors, 108 nurses, and volunteers.

The addition of the Payson-Whitney Pavilion in 1963 increased the inpatient capacity to 286 beds. Changes from 1969 to 1976 included creation of the Cohen Pavilion and the Levitt Ambulatory Care Clinic. The Payson-Whitney Pavilion also was expanded to ten stories and named the Payson-Whitney Tower (now just Tower Pavilion). This increased the hospital's inpatient capacity to 512 beds.

In 1992, the construction of the Don Monti Memorial Pavilion increased inpatient capacity to 731 beds. In 2006, North Shore University Hospital named its campus in honor of contributor and trustee, Sandra Atlas Bass.

In 2024 the hospital opened the 288,000 square foot Petrocelli Surgical Pavilion which added 18 operating rooms, 3 hybrid operating rooms and 132 ICU beds. The facility was built to expand capacity for the cardiac, neurosurgery and transplant programs.

The hospital was designed by Manoug Exerjian.

=== The health system ===
In the 1990s, North Shore University Hospital started acquiring and merging with hospitals in the New York area, starting in 1990 with the Community Hospital at Glen Cove, now Glen Cove Hospital. The two hospitals formed the North Shore Regional Health Services Corporation, soon renamed the North Shore Health System.

The North Shore Health System continued to expand to other communities on Long Island over the next several years. By 1995, it developed sponsorship agreements with Franklin Hospital now Long Island Jewish Valley Stream and Huntington Hospital. It then acquired Syosset Hospital, Plainview Hospital, Staten Island University Hospital and LaGuardia Hospital now known as Long Island Jewish Forest Hills.

In 1997, the two largest medical centers on Long Island, North Shore Health System and Long Island Jewish Medical Center, merged, creating the North Shore-Long Island Jewish Health System, which is known today as Northwell Health. In 2008 Northwell was the third-largest non-profit secular healthcare system in the United States, based on number of beds.

=== Research ===
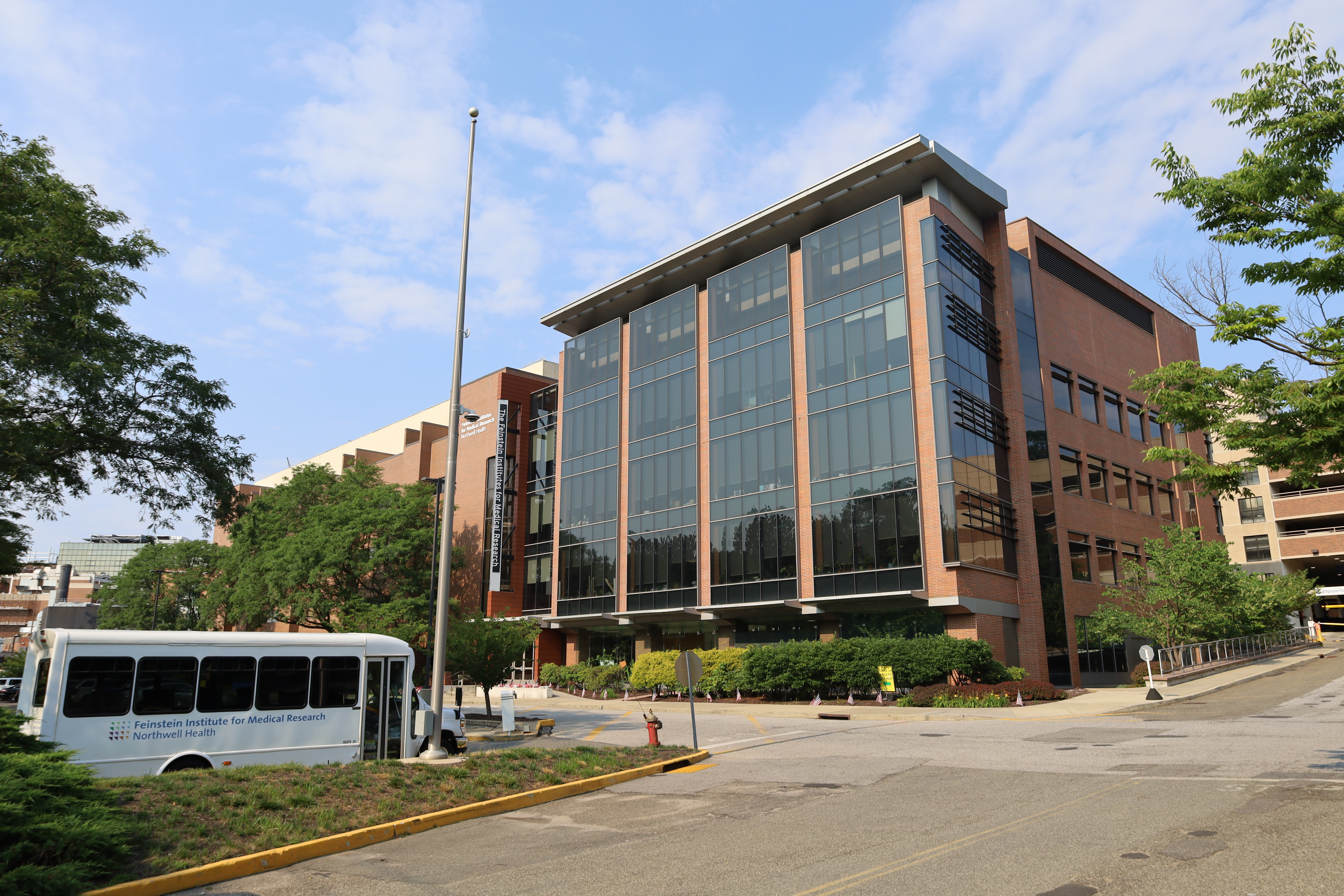
Feinstein Institute for Medical Research in 2021

In 1991, Anthony Cerami left Rockefeller University and founded the Picower Institute for Medical Research on the grounds of North Shore University Hospital; the institute was funded by Jeffry Picower.

The Institute for Medical Research at North Shore-Long Island Jewish was founded in 1999, and in 2002 it acquired the Picower Institute. In 2005, board member Leonard Feinstein, the co-founder of Bed Bath & Beyond Inc., made a multimillion-dollar gift to the institute, which led to the institute being renamed The Feinstein Institutes for Medical Research.

== Designations ==
- ACS verified Level I Trauma Center
- Comprehensive Stroke Center
- Regional Perinatal Center
- AIDS Center
- SAFE Program Hospital

== Rankings ==
North Shore University Hospital is nationally ranked in 10 adult specialties and high performing in 19 procedures/conditions according to U.S. News and World Report. The hospital was on the "Best Hospital Honor Roll" for 2023-2024 and 2024-2025 but did not make the list for 2025-2026.

2026-2027 U.S. News & World Report Quality Rankings & Ratings for North Shore University Hospital
Speciality	Rank (In the U.S.)
Cancer	#49
Cardiology, Heart & Vascular Surgery	#18
Diabetes & Endocrinology	#14
Gastroenterology & GI Surgery	#30
Geriatrics	#30
Neurology & Neurosurgery	#24
Obstetrics & Gynecology	#24
Orthopedics	#15
Pulmonology & Lung Surgery	#25
Urology	#15

== Academics ==
In 1969, North Shore Hospital affiliated with Cornell University Medical College (now Weill Medical College of Cornell University), changing its name to North Shore University Hospital. The hospital established an affiliation with NYU School of Medicine in 1994 and with the Albert Einstein College of Medicine of Yeshiva University upon merging with Long Island Jewish Medical Center.

After the merger of North Shore Health System and Long Island Jewish Medical Center, the health system moved to gradually merge its academics, culminating in 2012 with the merger of North Shore and Long Island Jewish internal medicine residency programs.

In October 2007, Hofstra University announced that it would open a new medical school, in partnership with Northwell Health. The Zucker School of Medicine at Hofstra/Northwell opened in 2011. As of 2019, the Zucker School of Medicine ranks 72 in best medical schools nationwide for research.

In addition to undergraduate medical education, Northwell Health provides graduate medical education to over 1,200 residents and fellows through its 90 residency and fellowship training programs.
