= Radio Free Europe/Free Europe Committee - Encrypted Telexes =

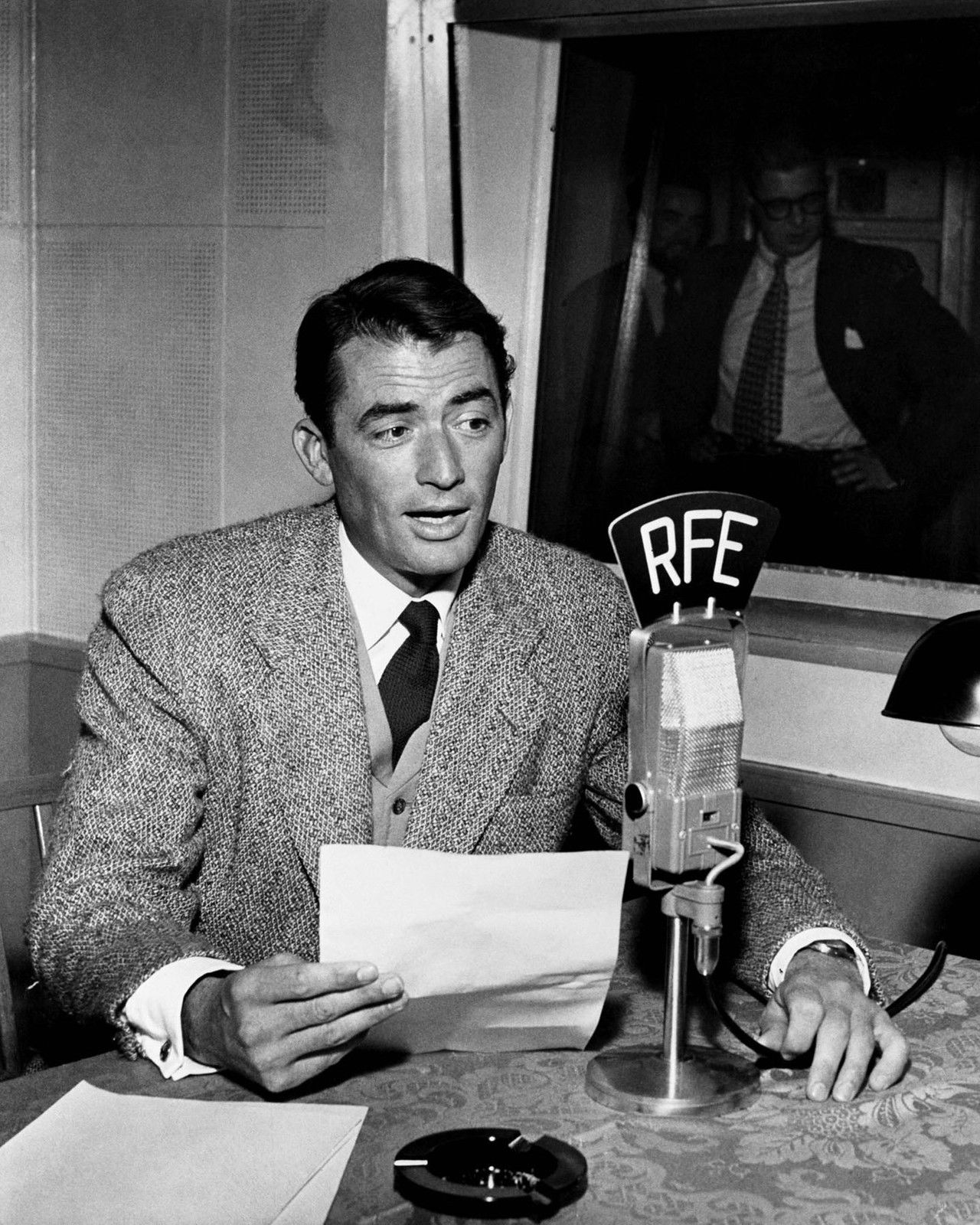
Peck Radio Free Europe Publicity Photo, 1953.

Radio Free Europe/Free Europe Committee - Encrypted Telexes is a digital curated collection available for research at Blinken Open Society Archives.

== Description ==
This is the Cold War collection that has been processed, described, and partly made accessible online by Vera and Donald Blinken Open Society Archives in Budapest. The collection arrived from the Hoover Institution Library and Archives at Stanford University in 2014. It consists of 101 microfilm reels that remained after the original paper material was destroyed after subsequent microfilming. Upon arrival to Budapest the microfilm reels were digitized, creating more than 111000 electronic files. The collection contains three types of primarily corporate but also valuable historical documents. The Free Europe Committee President's Office materials were produced by the Presidents of the Free Europe Committee with decisions they made between the 1950s and 1970s. Attached to these documents is a vast body of encrypted telexes that were daily exchanged between RFE headquarters in Munich and New York. The third body of archival materials concerns RFE engineering department with rather technical issues including daily frequencies of the radio programs, atmospheric conditions, radio transmission, jamming, and other issues. Once processed, these historical records will shed more light on the US’s Cold War initiative to combat Soviet influence and distortion of information in Eastern Europe. OSA hopes that the public access to the new FEC digital collection will contribute to the better understanding of the trans-Atlantic connections, émigré aspirations, the operation of Radio Free Europe and finally the FEC institution per se as valuable resources for further scholarly research on the Cold War era.

== Structure of the Encrypted Telex Messages ==
The encrypted telexes consist of two main parts. The message header contain the message number - for the given month, and the location from where it originated. Very frequently we find MUN - for Munich, and NYC - for New York two RFE headquarters (rarely Lisbon). The message header also contains family names (without Christian names) of those who send and those who receive the telex. Very often there are more than 2 or three senders while those who received it could be up to 10 or even more people. All telexes have above mentioned parameters that also created our metadata. The second part of the message contained message text that could be of various nature, prom cooperate employment information to technical issues concerning building of the radio infrastructure. Also, circa 45 percent of the telexes contained the information on the historical events and distinguished politicians from the communist Eastern Europe. As some messages were encrypted it was difficult to decode them without supplement message or hand written note on the real meaning of the encrypted text.

Some of the encrypted messages hold special information with “CONFIDENTIAL”, “STRICTLY CONFIDENTIAL”, “URGENT” or “EYES ONLY” stamps. With this status the creator wanted to prioritize the messages according to their importance and exclusivity for the RFE/FEC management. The urgency/secrecy status of the document reflects on the given historical moment or can also indicate the level of secrecy of the content distributed.

The label “Associated People” contains information about the senders, recipients and copied recipients. Defining the participants in the communication is crucial in description of each message. Because all the participants in the communication are identified usually only by their last name, it is sometimes difficult to clearly distinguish between people who share the same last name, or are spouses..

== Content of the Telexes ==
The content of the telexes could be separated into several groups. The first one contain information relating to daily operational and functional of the Radio Free Europe as corporate institution. Lot of messages is dedicated to the employment of the new personnel, including their personal and marriage status, their salaries, approved salary rise, vacations or information on obtaining residence permits in Germany etc. The second group of messages are those of technical nature narrowly connected with the construction of the radio infrastructure such as radio transmitters, receivers, purchase of new equipment, etc. The following group are telexes relating to the radio program policy with the instructions what type of news and which topics should be in the focus of radio news. As there was a quite intensive publishing activity, some messages reflected on this issues of publishing of various RFE materials. Finally, the last group of telexes are those pertaining historical information on the known political events in Eastern Europe and other Communist world, such as strikes, unrests, revolutions, Soviet invasion to Hungary in 1956, and Czechoslovakia in 1968, but also Cuban missiles crisis, or Sino - Soviet dispute. Special attention was focused on Soviet and other communist leaders, their speeches, activities, etc. However, many messages contain information on dissidents, political opponents and opposition in the communist countries.
