= National Center for Healthcare Leadership =

- Formation: 2001
- Type: Not-for-profit
- Headquarters: Chicago, IL, USA
- Location: Nationwide
- Members: Organizational
- Chief Executive Officer: David Schreiner, PhD
- Key people: Jarrett Fowler, MPPA, Senior Director, Strategic and International Initiatives Meghan Nousaine, MPH, Senior Director, Communications and Development
- Budget: $2 million
- Website: www.nchl.org

The National Center for Healthcare Leadership (NCHL) is an American 501(c)(3) nonprofit organization that promotes evidence-based best practices within the healthcare leadership, organizational development, and international healthcare spaces. NCHL operates three organizational membership programs – the Leadership Excellence Networks (LENS), the National Council on Administrative Fellowships (NCAF), and the US Cooperative for International Patient Programs (USCIPP) – that in total comprise over 160 US hospitals and health systems and nearly 40 graduate health management programs at US institutions.

== History ==
NCHL was founded in 2001 as the result of a national summit on healthcare leadership funded by the Robert Wood Johnson Foundation, which identified a need for greater emphasis within the health sector on adopting organizationally based leadership development practices. During its early years, NCHL supported an Advanced Leadership Development Program for healthcare executives and developed the validated National Health Leadership Competency Model in collaboration with the Hay Group. NCHL also established an invitational symposium and national leadership award dinner, which is held every November in Chicago.

In the mid-2000s, NCHL, in collaboration with the Accrediting Commission on Education for Health Services Administration, supported the evolution of graduate healthcare management education from a knowledge-based to a competency-based approach. By 2007, competency-based education had become an established part of the accreditation process and was expanded further in the 2013 revision of the accrediting guidelines.

NCHL's debut organizational membership program, LENS, was founded as an institutional membership group for leading healthcare organizations that recognize that leadership development and talent management programs are integral to their strategic goals. In 2013, NCHL's programs were expanded to include USCIPP, an organizational membership program that aims to expand global access to US expertise in high-quality healthcare. In 2014, NCHL established a coordinated improvement effort for administrative fellowships, NCAF. NCHL supports members of all three programs through collaboration, education, and research.

== Current activity ==
The programs of NCHL are supported primarily through membership fees contributed by organizational members. Participants in NCHL's membership programs vary based on the specific program, but they generally involve leaders who are responsible for a specific leadership activity within their own health system or university, such as healthcare leadership development, international healthcare services, or an administrative fellowship program. Participants identify and prioritize areas in which support from NCHL can help pursue improvements collaboratively.

NCHL engages in several research initiatives, including a number of industrywide benchmarking data collection efforts to support decision-making within NCHL's program member institutions:

- NCHL operates an awards program – the Best Organizations in Leadership Development – that recognizes health systems for their use of evidence-based practices in leadership development. The survey used by the program, the National Healthcare Leadership Survey, receives updates based on emerging research on the science of leadership development. Data generated by survey takers have been used to assess relationships between leadership development practices and specific health system outcomes such as financial performance and patient experience.
- NCHL maintains a validated interprofessional health leadership competency model, the NCHL Health Leadership Competency Model™, which is made available to the field via their website.
- USCIPP's Annual Benchmarking Survey of International Programs in the US surveys USCIPP’s member hospitals and health systems with established international programs. The survey allows respondents to benchmark their international program operations against those at peer US institutions. The annual USCIPP member survey collects information about services offered, financial metrics, operational metrics, and international patient volumes. Additionally, the survey results provide insights into international program structures and geographic regions of home residence for patients traveling to the US for care. The survey results are the only reliable source for industry information about international patient volumes and revenues at US healthcare institutions, as the data are submitted directly to USCIPP from the hospitals themselves. Recognizing that USCIPP's membership comprises most but not all US hospital and health systems with established international health programs, the results of the benchmarking survey are best considered as a lower bound estimate for the actual size of the US market.
- In 2016, USCIPP members identified the development of standardized metrics to measure international patient experience and satisfaction that can be benchmarked across organizations as a high-priority need for the consortium. USCIPP then partnered with Rush University’s Center for the Advancement of Healthcare Value (CAHV) to develop the survey instrument, methodology, administration platform, and database necessary to launch the USCIPP International Patient Experience Initiative. The survey allows US hospitals to collect feedback from international patients and families, analyze international patient experience data longitudinally, and benchmark the results against those of their peer institutions.

== See also ==
- Association of University Programs in Health Administration
- Rush University
- University of Michigan
- US Cooperative for International Patient Programs
