= Plainview Hospital =

- Northwell Health
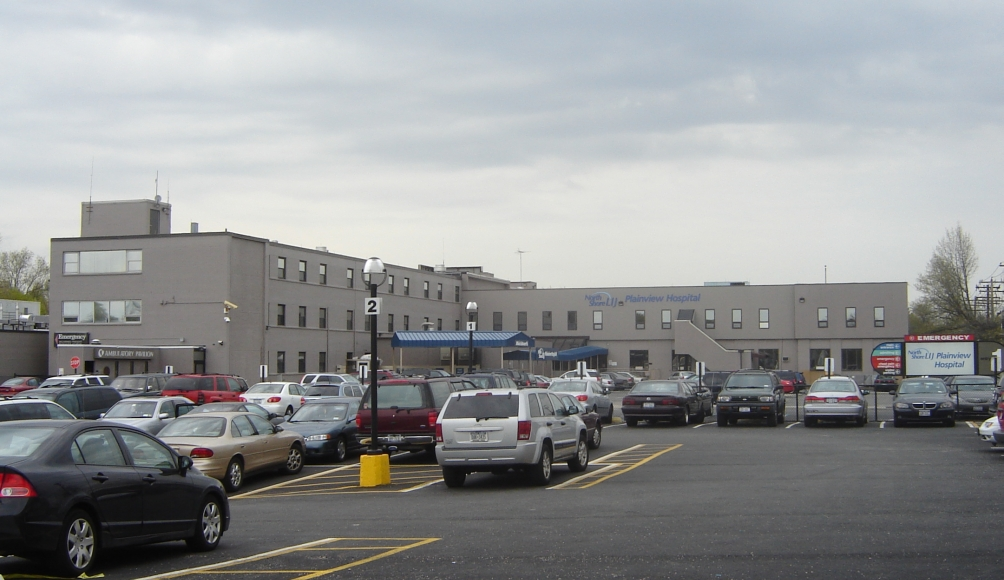

Geography
- Location: 888 Old Country Road in Plainview, New York, United States
- Coordinates: 40°46′29.31″N 73°28′46.83″W

Organization
- Type: Community General hospital
- Affiliated university: Zucker School of Medicine

Services
- Emergency department: Yes
- Beds: 219

History
- Opened: June 25, 1961

Links
- Website: plainview.northwell.edu
- Lists: Hospitals in New York State

Plainview Hospital is an acute care community hospital with 219 beds located on 888 Old Country Road in Plainview, New York. This hospital is one of the 22 member hospitals that make up Northwell Health. Prior to merging with Northwell Health, Plainview Hospital was known as Central General Hospital. Today, the hospital is led by Executive Director Michael Fener.

== History ==
The Town of Oyster Bay first approved construction of the hospital on May 25, 1956. The hospital opened with a dedicative ribbon-cutting ceremony five years later, on June 25, 1961. The t-shaped building had 205 beds and 154 staff members. The building was named Central General Hospital, for its central location on Long Island. Dr. Anton Notey oversaw its construction and was the hospital's owner and Executive Director until his indictment in 1978 for a nursing home kickback scheme. After Dr. Notey was indicted, Robert J. Bornstein replaced him as Administrator of the hospital. In July 1984, the hospital purchased a $70,000 ($177,573.35 adjusted for inflation) Sharplan surgical laser. At the time, it was one of the latest technologies available, and was one of only 500 lasers sent to North America.

On December 22, 1994, Central General Hospital officially became a member of the North Shore Health System which eventually merged with LIJ to form the North Shore-LIJ Health System (now Northwell); this meant the hospital changed from a for-profit to a not-for-profit hospital. This also meant that the name of the hospital would change to Plainview Hospital, however people used the name Central General Hospital for the next few years. After the acquisition by North Shore-LIJ, over 100 benefactors pledged to donate at least $1,000 ($1,614.34 adjusted for inflation) for the purpose of upgrading and replacing medical equipment.

Today, the hospital has 219 beds, and is overseen by Executive Director Michael Fener, who also oversees nearby Syosset Hospital. In 2018, the telemetry unit received a complete makeover and renovation that cost $2,000,000. Currently, the hospital is going under a $19,000,000 cardiac catherization wing with two labs.

The caterization wing under construction, August 2020.

During the COVID-19 pandemic, Old Country Road was given a secondary name of "Heroes Way" between Kalda Lane and Gerhard and Central Park Roads, to honor the first responders that work in the hospital.

== Services ==
Plainview Hospital currently has 219 beds and can handle general emergency, wounds, gastroenterology, palliative, and urology services. It also has a gynecological wing.

This hospital is a teaching hospital affiliated with the Zucker School of Medicine, Hofstra Northwell School of Nursing and Physician Assistant Studies and the New York Institute of Technology College of Osteopathic Medicine.
