= Huntington Hospital (New York) =

- Northwell Health

Geography
- Location: 270 Park Ave Huntington, New York, United States
- Coordinates: 40°52′46″N 73°24′59″W

Organization
- Type: Short Term Acute Care
- Affiliated university: Zucker School of Medicine

Services
- Emergency department: Level III trauma center
- Beds: 371

Helipads
- Helipad: Yes

History
- Opened: 1916

Links
- Website: huntington.northwell.edu
- Lists: Hospitals in New York State

Huntington Hospital, a member of Northwell Health, is a community and teaching acute care hospital located in Huntington, New York. It has 371 beds and is affiliated with the Donald and Barbara Zucker School of Medicine at Hofstra/Northwell.

== History ==
Huntington Hospital was opened largely thanks to the work of Cornelia Prime who is considered among the town's greatest benefactors. In 1914 she purchased the five acre plot that the hospital still sits on and agreed to cover the costs of construction. The hospital was completed by around Christmas 1915 and its first patient was admitted in February 1916.

== Designations ==
The hospital is a Level III Trauma Center and was verified as such by the American College of Surgeons in 2017. In addition to its trauma center, the hospital is also a New York State designated Primary Stroke Center as well as a Level II Perinatal Center
