= Northwell Health =

Healthcare network in Long Island, New York, U.S.

Coordinates: 40°45′33.6″N 73°41′56.2″W

- Logo since 2017
- Formerly: North Shore-Long Island Jewish Health System
- Type: Private
- Industry: Health care
- Founded: Great Neck, New York, U.S. 1997; 29 years ago
- Founder: Merger of North Shore Health System and LIJ Medical Center
- Headquarters: New Hyde Park, New York, U.S.
- Number of locations: 1,000+
- Area served: New York metropolitan area
- Key people: John D'Angelo, MD, president and chief executive officer (October 2025-Present) Michael J. Dowling, president and chief executive officer (January 2002-September 2025)
- Products: Healthcare and medical
- Services: Hospital network
- Revenue: 501,573,179 United States dollar (2011)
- Total assets: 932,534,371 United States dollar (2011)
- Number of employees: 105,000+
- Website: www.northwell.edu

Northwell Health (commonly shortened to simply "Northwell") is a nonprofit integrated healthcare network that is New York state's largest healthcare provider and private employer, with more than 105,000 employees.

The health system spans two states, New York and Connecticut. It comprises 28 hospitals and over 1,000 ambulatory care facilities across Long Island, the five boroughs of New York City, Westchester, the Hudson Valley, and Western Connecticut. The flagship hospitals of Northwell are North Shore University Hospital and Long Island Jewish Medical Center. The healthcare network is also headquartered on Long Island, in New Hyde Park, Nassau County.

== History ==
=== Formation and early expansion ===
In 1990, North Shore University Hospital in Manhasset purchased Glen Cove Hospital and became North Shore Health Systems Inc. Throughout the decade the health network continued to expand, purchasing other surrounding hospitals, and by 1997 had a total of 10 hospitals spanning from Staten Island to Suffolk County, New York.

In 1997, North Shore Health Systems merged with Long Island Jewish Medical Center, forming the "North Shore-Long Island Jewish Health System," after an unsuccessful legal challenge by the United States Department of Justice to block the merger. In September of 2015, the health system changed its name to Northwell Health.

=== COVID-19 ===
During the COVID-19 pandemic, Northwell Health developed systems to monitor and manage the health of its workforce, which included over 78,000 employees. The health system implemented both digital symptom monitoring and case management to assess employees, track symptoms or exposures, and manage returns to work. Northwell later expanded to support testing, changing variants, vaccination programs, and vaccine mandates and integrated its own employee health systems with immunizations registries to support vaccination reporting and compliance.

Northwell began preparation for its vaccination infrastructure as COVID-19 vaccines entered development. The health system administered the first COVID-19 vaccine in the United States to one of its critical care nurses, Sandra Lindsay, at Long Island Jewish Medical Center in Queens. After, the health system adapted its vaccination workflows to serve non-employee populations, including first responders and other emergency workers.

The Smithsonian's National Museum of American History acquired items from Lindsay's vaccination for its permanent collection, as documentation of the nation's response to the pandemic. In July 2022, Lindsay received the Presidential Medal of Freedom from President Joe Biden for her contributions to public health and her role as the first person in the United States to receive a COVID-19 vaccine.

=== Merger with Nuvance Health ===
In May 2025, Northwell completed a planned merger with Nuvance Health. The two nonprofit health systems continued operating under the Northwell name, supporting a combined 13 million people through 28 hospitals, 1,050 ambulatory care sites, and 73 urgent care centers across New York and Connecticut. This marked the first time the Northwell health system operated beyond New York.

=== Expansions and other growth ===
In May 2025, long-time CEO Michael Dowling stepped down after 23 years. He was succeeded by John D'Angelo, previously Northwell's EVP, market president, and chief of integrated operations.

In December 2025, Northwell expanded into Pennsylvania. That same month, Northwell signed a direct agreement with 32BJ Health Fund, a labor union, to negotiate medical costs directly, bypassing traditional insurance. It was described as the largest direct contract in the U.S., and 32BJ estimated it would save $46 million the first year of the agreement.

== Research ==
The Feinstein Institutes for Medical Research is the research arm of Northwell Health.

== Billing controversy ==
On 12 April 2024, New York attorney general Letitia James announced that her office secured more than 1 million dollars from Northwell after they deceptively advertised that three of their emergency departments were COVID-19 testing sites. The health system would bill the claim as an ER visit even though the only care that some received was having been administered a COVID test. Others who sought care at their ERs for other issues were charged for the COVID test as well as the ER visit, despite federal and state laws prohibiting the billing of COVID-19 tests and related services. Northwell paid about $650,000 in penalties to the state and refunded about $400,000 to around 2,000 patients.

== Hospitals ==
The following hospitals and medical facilities are part of Northwell Health.

Name	Location	County or Borough	Opened
Cohen Children's Medical Center	New Hyde Park	Queens	1983
Danbury Hospital	Danbury	Fairfield	1885
Glen Cove Hospital	Glen Cove	Nassau	1921
Huntington Hospital	Huntington	Suffolk	1916
Greenwich Village Hospital (formerly Lenox Health Greenwich Village)	Greenwich Village	Manhattan	2014
Lenox Hill Hospital	Upper East Side	Manhattan	1857
Long Island Jewish Medical Center	Lake Success	Nassau	1954
Long Island Jewish Forest Hills	Forest Hills	Queens	1953
Long Island Jewish Valley Stream	Valley Stream	Nassau	1963
Manhattan Eye, Ear, and Throat Hospital	Upper East Side	Manhattan	1869
Mather Hospital	Port Jefferson	Suffolk	1929
New Milford Hospital	New Milford	Litchfield	1921
North Shore University Hospital	Manhasset	Nassau	1953
Northern Duchess Hospital	Rhinebeck	Dutchess	
Northern Westchester Hospital	Mount Kisco	Westchester	1916
Norwalk Hospital	Norwalk	Fairfield	1893
Peconic Bay Medical Center	Riverhead	Suffolk	1951
Phelps Hospital	Sleepy Hollow	Westchester	1955
Putnam Hospital	Carmel	Putnam	1964
Plainview Hospital	Plainview	Nassau	1961
South Oaks Hospital	Amityville	Suffolk	
South Shore University Hospital	Bay Shore	Suffolk	1911
Sharon Hospital	Sharon	Litchfield	1909
Staten Island University Hospital North & South	South Beach and Prince's Bay	Staten Island	1861
Syosset Hospital	Syosset	Nassau	1962
Vassar Brothers Medical Center	Poughkeepsie	Dutchess	1882
Zucker Hillside Hospital	Glen Oaks	Queens	1926

== SkyHealth ==
SkyHealth is an medevac helicopter service which is jointly owned by Northwell and the Yale New Haven Health System. It currently operates two Eurocopter EC135 helicopters each staffed with a pilot, critical-care nurse and paramedic which have full ICU capabilities. The service launched with one helicopter on November 14th, 2014 which is operated by Med-Trans and is based out of Farmingdale Republic Airport. In February of 2023, a second helicopter was launched which is based out of Sikorsky Memorial Airport. SkyHealth were featured in the Netflix docu-series Emergency NYC.

== Northwell Nurse Choir ==
In 2020, during the ongoing COVID-19 pandemic, a choir was formed consisting of eighteen nurses who had worked on the frontline to aid those affected by the virus. Created to support the nonprofit Nurse Heroes group, the members performed virtually in order to ensure safety . The group came to prominence in 2021 when they auditioned on the 16th season of America's Got Talent.
