= Long Island Jewish Medical Center =

- Northwell Health

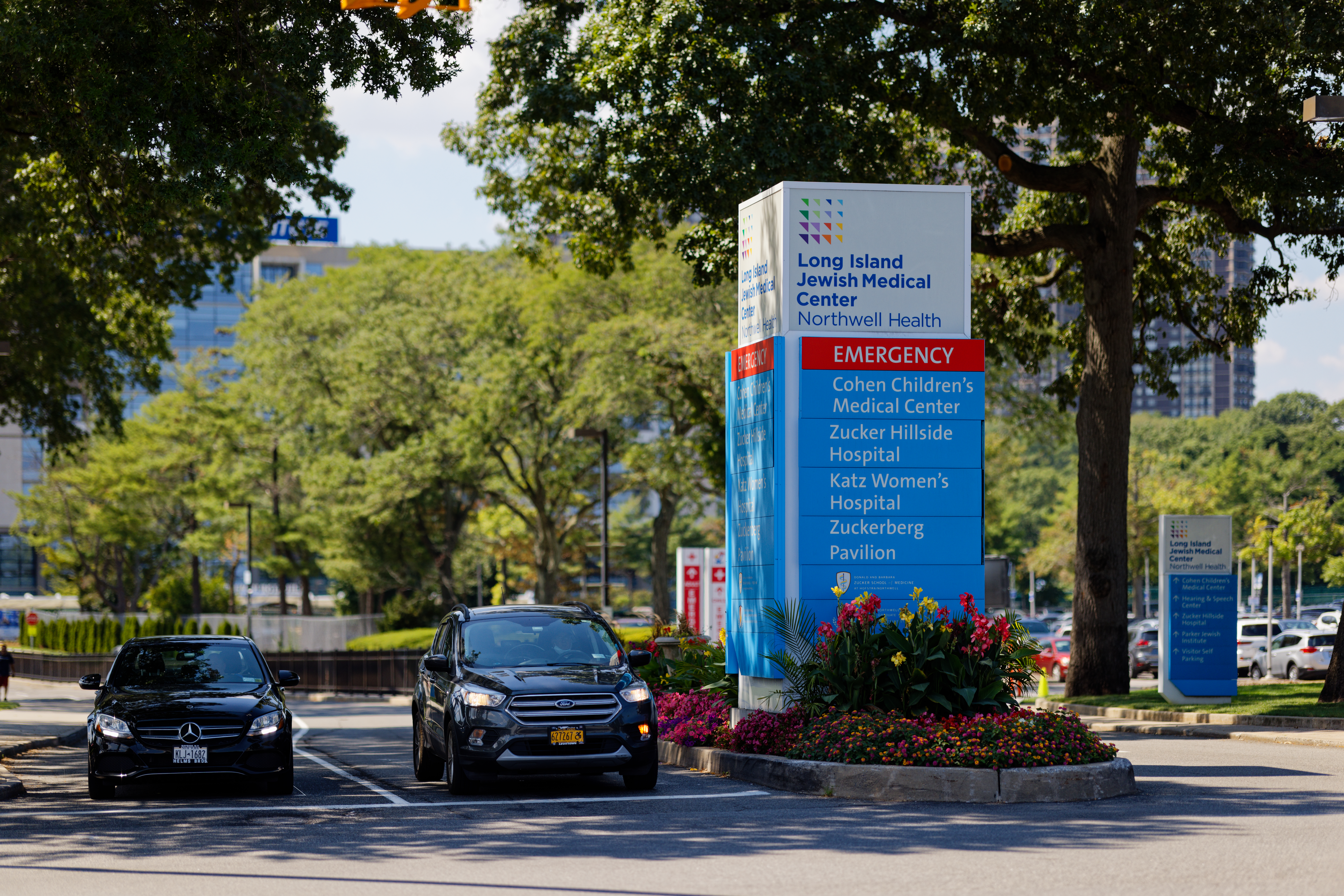
- Entrance to the hospital

Geography
- Location: Glen Oaks, New York City, New York, United States
- Coordinates: 40°45′15″N 73°42′32″W

Organization
- Type: Teaching
- Affiliated university: Zucker School of Medicine

Services
- Emergency department: Yes
- Beds: 583 - LIJ Medical Center; 1,014 - Entire campus

History
- Founded: 1954

Links
- Website: www.northwell.edu
- Lists: Hospitals in New York State
- Other links: Hospitals in Queens

Long Island Jewish Medical Center (also known as LIJ or LIJ Medical Center) is a 1,014-bed, non-profit tertiary care teaching hospital and medical campus with the Northwell Health system. The 48-acre (19 ha) campus is 15 miles (24 km) east of Manhattan, straddling the border of Queens and Nassau counties, in the neighborhood of Glen Oaks and village of Lake Success, respectively.

LIJMC has three hospitals that encompass the medical campus: Long Island Jewish Medical Center, Cohen Children’s Medical Center, and The Zucker Hillside Hospital (an in-patient and out-patient psychiatric hospital and clinic previously known as Hillside Hospital).

Long Island Jewish Medical Center (often simply called LIJ) is a 583-bed tertiary, adult acute-care hospital with advanced diagnostic and treatment technology, and modern facilities for medical, surgical, dental and obstetrical care. LIJ is a Regional Perinatal Center and its maternity program is among the busiest in New York State with over 7,400 deliveries a year.

As a primary teaching hospital (along with North Shore University Hospital) for the Zucker School of Medicine, the Hofstra Northwell School of Nursing and Physician Assistant Studies, LIJMC's graduate medical education program is one of the largest in New York State, and whose programs are headed by full-time faculty.

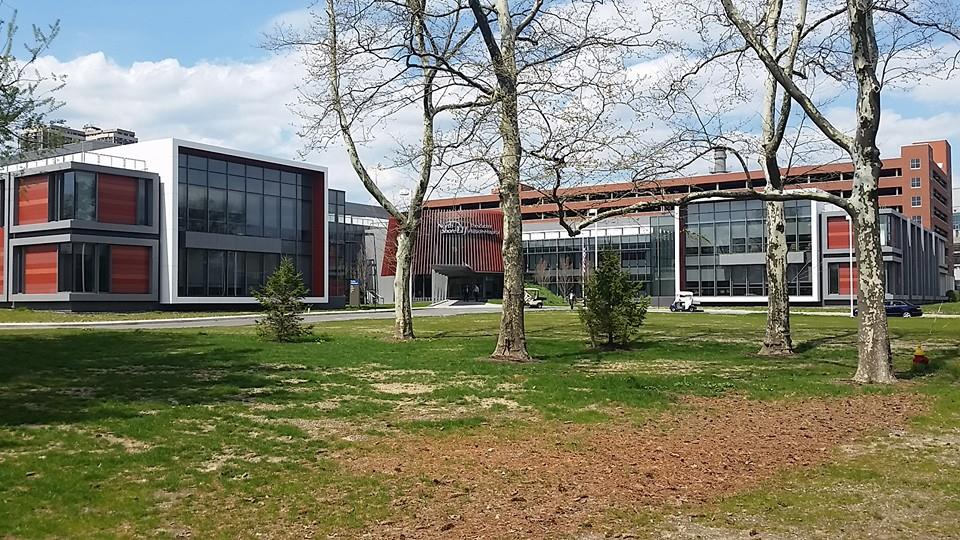
The Zucker Hillside Hospital

LIJ's full-time staff includes more than 500 physicians, who supervise care in all major specialties and participate in the medical center's teaching and research programs.

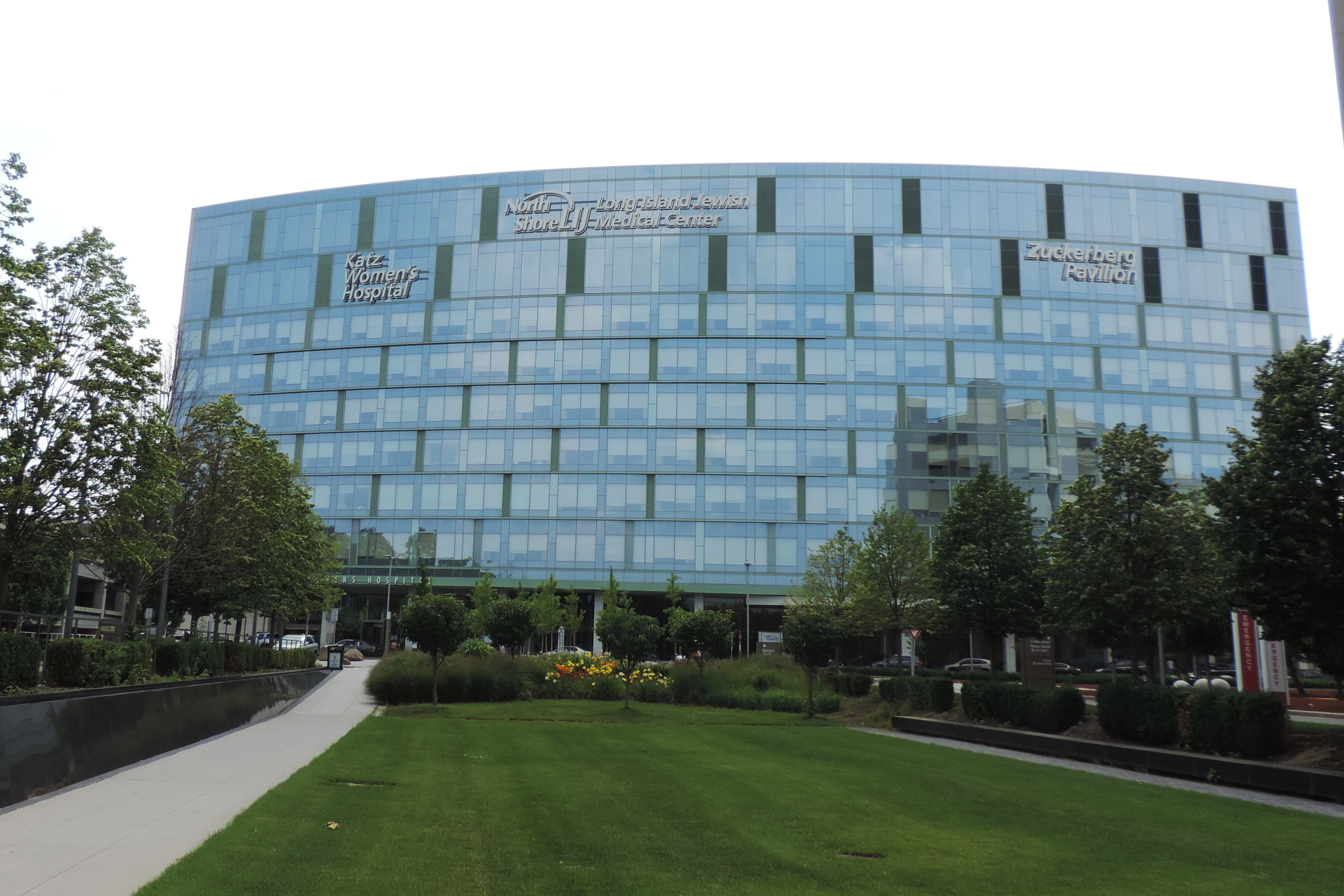
The Zuckerberg Pavilion, opened in 2011

The medical center is located on the southeast side of North Shore Towers. The center was founded in 1954 by a group of nine philanthropists, including Jacob H. Horwitz.

Hillside Hospital merged with Long Island Jewish Hospital in 1975, and in turn the entire complex became part of Northwell Health in 2015.

In 2011, the Zuckerberg Pavilion was opened. This was followed in 2012 by the Katz Women's Hospital, a nine-story glass tower with private delivery rooms nursery and additional private rooms for cardiac patients.

== Rankings ==
LIJ Medical Center is tied as the #5 hospital in New York. It is nationally ranked in 7 adult specialties, high performing in 2 adult specialties and 19 procedures/conditions. Cohen Children's Medical Center is also used in evaluating LIJ, for pediatric rankings see: Cohen Children's Medical Center Rankings

2026-2027 U.S. News & World Report Quality Rankings & Ratings for Long Island Jewish Medical Center
Speciality	Rank (In the U.S.)
Cancer	High Performing
Diabetes & Endocrinology	#12
Gastroenterology & GI Surgery	High Performing
Geriatrics	#42
Neurology & Neurosurgery	#44
Obstetrics & Gynecology	#27
Orthopedics	#17
Pulmonology & Lung Surgery	#40
Urology	#21

== Notable people ==
=== Notable births ===
- April 12, 1961: Willi Ninja; dancer and choreographer.
- March 6, 1965: John Bernikow; NYC graphic designer
- November 16, 1986: Omar Mateen; terrorist and perpetrator of the Orlando nightclub shooting.

=== Notable deaths ===
- September 14, 1992: Leon J. Davis; Polish-American labor leader who co-founded 1199SEIU United Healthcare Workers East.
- February 11, 1994; Saul Weprin; attorney and politician who was Speaker of the New York State Assembly.
- November 13, 1998; Red Holzman; basketball player and coach.
- June 25, 1999: Fred Trump; real estate developer and father of the 45th & 47th President of the United States, Donald Trump.

=== Notable employees ===
- Sean Kenniff; 4-year residency and chief resident
- Harold S. Koplewicz; Chief of child and adolescent psychiatry
- Dr. Sandra Lindsay DHSc, MS, MBA, RN, CCRN-K, NE-BC; First person in the U.S. to get the COVID-19 vaccine.

== Transportation ==
The MTA's Q46 bus stops inside the hospital. In addition, the QM5, QM6, QM8, QM35 and QM36 express buses to Manhattan all stop near LIJ.
