= List of Hofstra University people =

List of notable alumni and faculty of Hofstra University

The list of Hofstra University people includes notable graduates, professors, and administrators affiliated with Hofstra University.

== Academia ==
- David B. Allison, class of 1987, Distinguished Professor, Quetelet Endowed Professor of Public Health, University of Alabama at Birmingham
- Steven Feld, class of 1971, anthropologist and ethnomusicologist
- Lawrence C. Levy (born 1950), executive dean of the National Center for Suburban Studies at Hofstra University, and journalist
- Jonathan D. Moreno, BA 1973, professor at the University of Pennsylvania; senior fellow at the Center for American Progress; author
- Sharon Oster, BA 1970, professor of Management and Entrepreneurship at Yale School of Management
- Tina Park, trustee, Los Angeles Community College District
- Victor Ricciardi B.B.A. 1991, professor of business and author
- Steve Salbu (BA), dean emeritus of the Scheller College of Business at the Georgia Institute of Technology (2006–2014)
- Morton O. Schapiro, president of Northwestern University
- Robert Swirsky, author, lecturer, and computer scientist

== Business ==
- Chris Albrecht, former president and CEO of Starz, LLC; former chairman of HBO
- Avi Arad, B.B.A. 1972, CEO of Marvel Studios
- Diane Garnick, investment manager, author
- Neil Gillis, B.S. 1986, music publishing executive; founder of Round Hill Music and CollectivRights Management
- Gerald Guterman (attended), real estate investor and developer; chairman and CEO of Guterman Partners, LLC
- Charles Kushner, J.D. 1979, billionaire real estate developer; founder and co-owner of Kushner Properties
- Ralph S. Larsen, B.B.A. 1962, chief executive officer of Johnson & Johnson from 1989 to 2002
- Bernie Madoff, B.S. 1960, Wall Street investor convicted of multiple felonies related to the largest Ponzi scheme in history
- Kathryn V. Marinello, M.B.A. 1983, chairman, CEO, and a director of the Company for Stream Global Services
- Shawn Matthews, M.B.A., CEO of Cantor Fitzgerald & Co.
- James C. Metzger, B.A. 1983, chairman and CEO of the Whitmore Group, Ltd.
- Tommy Mottola, former chairman and CEO of Sony Music Entertainment; attended but did not graduate
- Scott Ross, B.S. 1974, founder, chairman, and CEO of Digital Domain, Inc.
- Steven C. Witkoff, B.A. 1980, J.D. 1983, Special Envoy to the Middle East for U.S. President Donald Trump; real estate investor and developer, founder of the Witkoff Group, attorney
- Frank G. Zarb, B.B.A.1957, MBA 1962, former chairman of NASD, Inc. and the Nasdaq Stock Market and chairman of insurer AIG

== Government, law and politics ==
- Bruce Blakeman, Nassau County executive, former adjunct professor
- Joseph Borg, J.D., securities commissioner of Alabama
- Jon Bramnick, J.D., represents District 21 in the New Jersey General Assembly
- Anutin Charnvirakul, BEng 1989, prime minister of Thailand
- Norm Coleman, former U.S. senator (R-Minnesota)
- Taylor Darling, member of the New York State Assembly
- Thomas DiNapoli, 1976, former New York state assemblyman; current New York State Comptroller
- Timothy S. Driscoll, justice of Supreme Court of New York, Nassau County
- Lenora Fulani, first woman and first African-American to appear on the ballot for U.S. president in all 50 states
- Owen H. Johnson, BA 1956, honorary JD '98, New York state senator (R)
- Peter S. Kalikow, MTA chairman
- Norm Kent, BA 1971, attorney, publisher (South Florida Gay News), radio talk show host (Norm Kent Show), chair of the board of National Organization for the Reform of Marijuana Laws (NORML)
- Ron Kovic, activist, paraplegic, author of Born on the Fourth of July
- Norman F. Lent, former U.S. congressman, New York (R)
- David A. Levy, former U.S. congressman, New York (R)
- Ed Mangano, Republican, Nassau County, New York county executive
- Hun Many, deputy prime minister of Cambodia
- Joseph Margiotta, former Nassau County, Long Island Republican chairman
- Mary Matalin, political consultant for the Republican Party; advisor to President George W. Bush and Vice President Dick Cheney (attended but did not graduate)
- Richard McCormack, BA 1970, member of the Vermont Senate
- Thomas McKevitt, BS, JD, represents District 17 in the New York State Assembly, which includes large portions of Nassau County
- Joseph Mondello, BA 1962, chairman, Nassau County (NY) Republican Committee
- Robert O. Muller, JD 1974, co-founder of International Campaign to Ban Landmines, the Nobel Peace Prize winner in 1997
- Callistus Ndlovu, Zimbabwean politician; taught history and politician science at Hofstra between 1969 and 1980
- David Paterson, first African-American governor of New York; former minority leader of the New York State Senate
- Evy Poumpouras, former U.S. Secret Service special agent
- Kathleen Riebe, member of the Utah State Senate
- Howard Safir, former New York City Police commissioner; former head of the United States Marshals Service
- Vincent Sapienza, former commissioner of the New York City Department of Environmental Protection
- Peter J. Schmitt, county legislator of Nassau County, New York's 12th District
- Luis R. Sepulveda, member of the New York State Senate, former member of the New York State Assembly
- Richard Socarides, J.D., head of public affairs for Gerson Lehrman Group, former White House advisor
- Maryanne Trump Barry, U.S. Court of Appeals judge
- Thomas C. Wales, assassinated federal prosecutor

== Film, theater, television, and radio ==
- Scott Aharoni, film producer and director; Bardo, Leylak, Psycho Therapy: The Shallow Tale of a Writer Who Decided to Write About a Serial Killer
- Avi Arad, film producer; founder of Marvel Studios; producer of the Spider-Man and X-Men films
- James Stacy Barbour, actor
- Brian Barry, SAG actor, X-Files, I Am Legend
- Lou Berger, 1972, head writer for children's television show Sesame Street; winner of 10 Emmys for outstanding writing
- James Caan (attended), actor, The Godfather
- Godfrey Cambridge (attended), actor, comedian, Watermelon Man
- Clifford Chapin, voice actor
- Margaret Colin, actress
- Alan Colmes, talk radio host, former co-host of Fox News Channel's Hannity & Colmes
- Ryan Colucci, film producer, director and writer; Battle for Terra, Suburban Cowboy, With You, Orient City: Ronin & The Princess
- Francis Ford Coppola, Academy Award-winning director, producer and writer of classics including The Godfather, The Godfather Part II, Apocalypse Now, Patton, The Outsiders, American Graffiti
- Peter Dante, played lacrosse at Hofstra; actor; The Waterboy, Big Daddy, Grandma's Boy
- Robert Davi, actor; Licence to Kill, Die Hard, The Goonies, Wiseguy
- John DeBella, disc jockey, WMGK Philadelphia
- Elizabeth Dennehy, actress
- Rosemarie DeWitt, actress; granddaughter of James Braddock
- Meredith Eaton-Gilden, actress and psychologist
- Steven Epstein, Sony Classical music producer
- Joe Frank, radio monologuist and playwright
- Peter Friedman, actor
- Lisa Glasberg, "Lisa G", radio and TV personality, The Howard Stern Show
- Adam Green, filmmaker, writer, director; Hatchet, Spiral, and Frozen
- Ellie Greenwich, songwriter, "Leader of the Pack", "Be My Baby", "Chapel of Love"
- Steven Haft, film producer and later senior executive at AOL and Time Inc
- Rashad Haughton, writer, film director, actor, screenwriter; brother of singer, actress and model Aaliyah
- Monica Horan, actress, Everybody Loves Raymond
- Dan Ingram, disc jockey, WCBS-FM, New York
- Anthony Ingrassia, playwright, producer and director
- Madeline Kahn, Tony Award winner for Best Actress, The Sisters Rosensweig; twice nominated for an Academy Award; Paper Moon, Blazing Saddles, Young Frankenstein, High Anxiety
- Lainie Kazan, actress, starred in My Big Fat Greek Wedding
- Francis Kenny, cinematographer, 2012 ASC Presidents Award
- Norm Kent, BA 1971, attorney, publisher, radio talk show host, WFTL
- Donnie Klang, solo artist, Making the Band 4
- Dennis Latos, film producer director and writer; Bardo, The Untimely Gift, Leylak
- Frederic Lebow, screenwriter, While You Were Sleeping
- George Loros, actor
- Charles Ludlam, playwright
- Tom McGowan, actor
- Joe Morton, actor, Terminator 2, American Gangster
- Katie Nolan, sports personality and television host
- Lisa Ortiz, voice actress, The Slayers, Pokémon, Sonic X
- Corey Rae, actress, model, writer, and activist
- Andrew Rea, YouTuber and filmmaker, Binging with Babish
- Anwar Robinson, American Idol Top 10 finalist
- Brandon "Scoop B" Robinson, NBA columnist, host on MSG Networks, CBS Sports Radio
- Robbie Rosen, B.S. 2016, American Idol contestant and EDM vocalist
- Philip Rosenthal, creator, producer and writer, Everybody Loves Raymond
- Scott Ross, producer; executive; founder of Digital Domain; General Manager of Industrial Light and Magic
- Susan H. Schulman, theater director
- Leslie Segrete, designer on TLC's While You Were Out and Trading Spaces
- Mike Starr, screen and stage actor; Goodfellas, Dumb and Dumber, Summer of Sam, The Natural, The Bodyguard, The Black Dahlia
- Joey Styles, play-by-play announcer for Extreme Championship Wrestling and World Wrestling Entertainment
- Susan Sullivan, actress
- Steven Tsapelas, writer and filmmaker
- Eliot Wald, B.A. 1967, television and film writer
- Mickey Waldman, received her Juris Doctor in 1981; WBAI radio host and producer
- Christopher Walken, attended as a dance student but did not graduate; Academy Award-winning actor
- Jay Wallace, president of Fox News

== Art, literature, and print media ==
- Emily Austin, social media influencer, sports journalist
- Jean Butler, dancer and choreographer
- August Darnell, aka Kid Creole, co-founder of Dr. Buzzard's Original Savannah Band, and later, Kid Creole and the Coconuts
- Gene Demby, journalist, reporter at NPR and host of the Code Switch podcast
- Nelson DeMille, author
- Stephen Dunn, Pulitzer Prize for poetry, 2001; former varsity basketball player
- Marilyn French, feminist, author of The Women's Room
- Pamela Geller, blogger, author, political activist, and commentator
- Patricia Reilly Giff, children's literature author, teacher
- Brenda Janowitz, writer and attorney
- Charlie Kadau, senior editor, Mad Magazine
- Madeline Kahn, Broadway Tony Award winner; appeared in television shows and movies including Blazing Saddles and High Anxiety
- Larry Keigwin, dancer and choreographer; choreographed Broadway's If/Then
- Donald S. Kellermann, journalist and opinion researcher
- Olivia, R&B singer
- Robert Phillips, classical guitarist
- Bob Rozakis, writer, editor, director of production at DC Comics
- Laurie Rozakis, writer of the Complete Idiots books
- Michelle Sakhai, painter
- Ron Shandler, national baseball analyst, writer
- George Vecsey, sportswriter for The New York Times

== Military ==
- Charles W. Dryden, lieutenant colonel and member of Tuskegee Airmen in World War II; Congressional Gold Medal recipient

== Technology ==
- Jeff Pulver, internet entrepreneur
- Lance Ulanoff, former editor-in-chief of PCMag

== Other ==
- Michael Franzese (attended), former Mafia Captain in the Colombo crime family
- Kira Kazantsev, Miss America 2015; majored in political science, global studies and geography

== Sports ==
=== Baseball ===
- Randy Levine, Hofstra Law School, 1980; senior counsel at Akin Gump Strauss Hauer and Feld, LLP; president of the New York Yankees
- Jen Pawol, baseball umpire; previously an All-American softball player for the Hofstra Pride softball team
- Ken Singleton, former New York Mets, Montreal Expos, and Baltimore Orioles player; current YES Network commentator (did not graduate)
- Don Taussig (born 1932), Major League Baseball player

=== Basketball ===
- Kenny Adeleke (born 1983), Nigerian basketball player
- Rick Apodaca, Puerto Rican professional basketball player who has played in the NCAA, USBL, NBDL, and the National Superior Basketball League of Puerto Rico
- Speedy Claxton, Golden State Warriors point guard
- Jimmy Hall (born 1994), basketball player in the Israeli National League
- John Irving, led the nation in rebounding in NCAA Div 1, picked for NBA by Detroit; one of two Hofstra players with 1,000 pts AND 1,000 rebounds
- Charles Jenkins, Philadelphia 76ers guard
- Bob McKillop, 1972, men's head basketball coach, Davidson College
- Nat Militzok, New York Knicks forward
- Steve Nisenson, holder of Hofstra all-time scoring record for 43 years
- Eli Pemberton (born 1997), basketball player in the Israeli Basketball Premier League
- Norman Richardson
- Loren Stokes, NBA free agent guard
- Zeke Upshaw, NBA G League player

=== Football ===
- Charlie Adams, wide receiver for the Houston Texans
- Kyle Arrington, New England Patriots cornerback
- Stephen Bowen, defensive end, Dallas Cowboys
- Rocky Butler, quarterback for the Toronto Argonauts
- Giovanni Carmazzi, former professional quarterback, drafted 65th in 2000 by San Francisco 49ers, but never took a regular season NFL snap
- Wayne Chrebet, former New York Jets wide receiver
- Brian Clark, linebacker
- Willie Colon, Pittsburgh Steelers offensive line
- Marques Colston, wide receiver for the New Orleans Saints
- Mike D'Amato, NFL defensive back, Oakland and New York Jets; Super Bowl III winner; Lacrosse All-American for Hofstra; only person to be All-American in lacrosse and win a Super Bowl
- Jordan Dangerfield (born 1990), NFL football player
- Devale Ellis, wide receiver for the Detroit Lions
- Dave Fiore, former San Francisco 49ers and Washington Redskins guard
- Don Gault, quarterback, Cleveland Browns
- DeMingo Graham, former offensive lineman for the San Diego Chargers Houston Texans
- Arlen Harris, running back and kick returner for the Atlanta Falcons
- Raheem Morris, BS Physical Education 1997, head coach of the Atlanta Falcons
- John Schmitt, center, played for 10 years with the New York Jets and one year with the Green Bay Packers; member of New York Jets Super Bowl III Championship team
- Lance Schulters, free safety for the Miami Dolphins
- Renauld Williams, former linebacker for the San Francisco 49ers

=== Ice hockey ===
- Jon Cooper, head coach, Tampa Bay Lightning

=== Lacrosse ===
- Athan Iannucci, midfielder, Philadelphia Wings, Chicago Machine and New Westminster Salmonbellies
- Blake Miller, midfielder, Long Island Lizards
- Nicky Polanco, Long Island Lizards
- Doug Shanahan, midfielder, Chicago Machine
- Vincent Sombrotto, midfielder, New York Saints, Long Island Lizards, four-time World Lacrosse Championship gold medalist, U.S. Lacrosse Hall of Fame
- Kevin Warne, college lacrosse coach

=== MMA ===
- Phil Baroni (attended), two-time Junior College All-American wrestler; former UFC fighter; current mixed martial artist
- Jay Hieron, Junior College Champion wrestler; retired MMA fighter
- Gian Villante, Hofstra Pride wrestler and football player; current MMA fighter in the UFC's Light Heavyweight Division
- Chris Weidman, two-time NCAA D-1 All-American wrestler, 3rd 2008 NCAA Wrestling Championships, and former UFC Middleweight Champion

=== Soccer ===
- Danny Elliott, striker, played for Hofstra Pride before moving back to England to play for Port Vale and Hartlepool United; also played in Spain for San Cristóbal

== Faculty ==
- Yousef Al-Abed, professor of Molecular Medicine
- Lance Becker, professor of Emergency Medicine
- Peter B. Berger, professor of Cardiology
- Herman A. Berliner, provost; senior vice president for Academic Affairs; dean of faculties; Lawrence Herbert Distinguished Professor
- Joel Block, clinical assistant professor of Psychiatry
- Frank Bowe, former professor; disability rights activist and pioneer
- David Jung-Kuang Chiu, former professor; dean of University Advisement; director of Asian Studies
- Barbara A. Cornblatt, professor of Psychiatry
- Herbert Deutsch, former professor; composer and co-inventor of the Moog synthesizer
- Stephen Dolgin, professor of Surgery
- Álvaro Enrigue, author and professor of Romance Languages
- Silvia Federici, autonomist Marxist-feminist
- Jay Fiedler (born 1971), NFL football quarterback, as Hofstra receivers coach in 1997
- Monroe Freedman, Lichtenstein Distinguished Professor of Legal Ethics; former HLS Dean (1973–77); author of Lawyers' Ethics in an Adversarial System (1975), the seminal work on lawyer-client privilege
- Michael J. Freeman, professor
- Robert W. Greene (1929–2008), Pulitzer Prize-winning journalist, professor of journalism and mass media studies
- Gary Gruber, professor, author, testing expert, physicist, educator
- Tammy Hensrud, opera singer and adjunct professor of voice
- Martha Hollander, professor, art historian, and poet
- Ken Kelsch (1947–2023), professor of film, cinematographer
- David Langer, professor of neurosurgery and radiology
- Harvey J. Levin, former university research professor, first holder of Augustus B. Weller Chair in Economics, communications economics author and government consultant
- Thomas G. McGinn, professor of Medicine
- Barbara Patton, assistant professor of Accounting, Taxation and Legal Studies in Business at Frank G. Zarb School of Business since 2002
- Leonid Poretsky, professor of Medicine
- Sina Y. Rabbany, professor of engineering; Dean of the Fred DeMatteis School of Engineering and Applied Science
- Jesse Roth, clinical professor of Molecular Medicine
- David B. Samadi, professor of urology
- Robert Sobel, professor and author
- Kevin J. Tracey, professor of Molecular Medicine
- Aaron Twerski (born 1939), the Irwin and Jill Cohen Professor of Law at Brooklyn Law School; former dean and professor of tort law at Hofstra University School of Law
