= Poretsky =

Poretsky (masculine), Poretskaya (feminine), or Poretskoye (neuter) may refer to:

Places

- Poretsky District, a district of the Chuvash Republic, Russia
- Poretsky (rural locality) (Poretskaya, Poretskoye), several rural localities in Russia

People

- Ignace Poretsky, one of the nicknames of Ignace Reiss (1899–1937), Soviet spy
- Leonid Poretsky (b. 1954), American endocrinologist
- Platon Poretsky (1846–1907), Russian astronomer, mathematician, and logician
