= Nicholas Chiorazzi =

- Education: Georgetown University School of Medicine
- Occupations: Physician, Scientist
- Employer: Feinstein Institutes for Medical Research
- Known for: Medical Research

Nicholas Chiorazzi is a physician and researcher from the United States. He is the head of the Karches Center for Chronic Lymphocytic Leukemia Research at the Feinstein Institutes for Medical Research in Manhasset, New York.

== Education ==
Nicholas Chiorazzi received his M.D. from Georgetown University School of Medicine and completed four years of internal medicine training in the Cornell Cooperating Hospitals program at North Shore University Hospital and Memorial Sloan-Kettering Cancer Center. He is also trained in Rheumatology and Allergy-Clinical Immunology.

== Academic appointments ==
Chiorazzi was a research fellow in immunology at Harvard University in the department of Baruj Benacerraf. He then worked with Henry G. Kunkel at Rockefeller University, studying human B cells in normal and disease settings. In 1987, Chiorazzi was appointed head of the newly created Division of Rheumatology & Allergy-Clinical Immunology at North Shore University Hospital. In 2000, he was appointed as the first director and CEO of the Feinstein Institutes for Medical Research, a position he held until January 2006. Chiorazzi is a Professor of Medicine and Cell Biology at the Albert Einstein College of Medicine. He is also head of the Karches Center for Chronic Lymphocytic Leukemia Research at The Feinstein Institutes for Medical Research.

== Principal scientific contributions ==
Chiorazzi's research interests revolve around understanding the activation and maturation of B-lymphocytes in health and disease, in particular chronic lymphocytic leukemia (CLL). Chiorazzi and his colleagues have demonstrated that: CLL cells are responsive to the signals from the internal microenvironment, specifically, those delivered by the B-cell antigen receptor (BCR) leading to leukemic cell proliferation and maturation or death; BCR-induced signals are likely delivered by common self-antigens and are mediated through sets of BCRs of remarkably similar amino acid structure; patients with CLL segregate into two subgroups based on BCR structure that differ dramatically in the clinical outcome; CLL cells proliferate and die in vivo at rates higher than originally appreciated. These findings have led to the view that (auto)antigen drive is a promoting factor in the development and evolution of CLL and has been pivotal in refining patient prognosis.

== Awards and honors ==
- Election to the American Society for Clinical Investigation, 1986
- Member of the Association of American Physicians
- Scientific Leadership Award from The S.L.E. Foundation, Inc., 2000
- Binet-Rai Medal for Outstanding Contribution to CLL Research
- Past President of the Association for Patient-Oriented Research
- Contributing Editor: Molecular Medicine (journal)
