= Kenneth S. Warren Institute =

American medical research institute

- Named after: Kenneth Warren
- Headquarters: Durham, North Carolina
- Services: non-profit biomedical research
- Key people: Anthony Cerami

The Kenneth S. Warren Institute (formerly the Drug and Vaccine Development Corporation) is a U.S. non-profit biomedical research organization based in Durham, North Carolina. It is named after Kenneth Warren, a physician-scientist known for advancing research and policy on diseases.

== History ==
=== Founding and early mission ===
The institute was incorporated as a not-for-profit foundation, and was chartered in 1980, under the name of the Drug and Vaccine Development Corporation (DVDC). In response to a U.S. government mandate on the industrial sector to contribute more directly to improving public health in emerging nations, the DVDC espoused to pay particular attention to health problems affecting populations in the developing world. It sought to promote work in the fields of parasitology and tropical medicine.

=== Expansion in New York ===
In 2001, the institute bought a 15-acre (61,000 m^{2}) campus located in Westchester County, New York, from the Kitchawan Institute (also known as the Weston Charitable Foundation). The campus and surrounding nature preserve was the Kitchawan Research Station of the Brooklyn Botanic Garden. The director and lead researcher was Anthony Cerami. Funding from the Burroughs Wellcome Fund for malaria research was granted to scholars at the institute. Collaborative work was also done with the Neuroscience Institute in Milan (previously part of the Italian National Research Council). Researchers at the Warren Institute looked at erythropoietin as a tissue-protective cytokine in brain injury. Eventually they developed non-erythropoietic small peptides for innate protection and repair of tissues from inflammation.

=== Institute relocation ===
The institute was moved from Westchester to the Research Triangle of North Carolina in 2014.
