= Betty Diamond =

American physician and researcher

- Born: 11 May 1948 (age 78); Hartford, CT
- Education: Radcliffe College, Harvard Medical School
- Occupations: Physician, Scientist
- Employer: Feinstein Institutes for Medical Research
- Known for: Medical research

Betty Diamond (born 11 May 1948) is an American physician and researcher. She is director of the Institute of Molecular Medicine at Northwell Health's Feinstein Institutes for Medical Research in Manhasset, New York. She was elected a member of the National Academy of Sciences in 2022.

== Education ==
Betty Diamond received her B.A. in Art History (Magna Cum) from Radcliffe College in 1969 and her M.D. from Harvard Medical School in 1973. In 1976, she began her residency at Columbia Presbyterian Medical Center, New York, New York, and in 1979 embarked on post-doctoral fellowship in Immunology with Dr. Matthew Scharff at the Albert Einstein College of Medicine, Bronx, New York.

== Academic career ==
Diamond has been on the faculty and chief of rheumatology at both Einstein and Columbia. She is currently head of the Center for Autoimmune and Musculoskeletal Disease at The Feinstein Institutes for Medical Research and Professor of Molecular Medicine at Hofstra Northwell School of Medicine. She has been on the board of the American College of Rheumatology, is past president of the American Association of Immunology, and is a member of the Institute of Medicine. She is also past chair of the scientific advisory board of the National Institute of Arthritis and Musculoskeletal and Skin Diseases (NIAMS) and has been on their Scientific Council.

Diamond helped to establish (and named) the Advancing Women in Science and Medicine (AWSM) group at the Feinstein Institutes in 2010. AWSM (pronounced "awesome") uses philanthropic support to help advance the careers of women scientists, countering gender bias and increasing gender equity.

== Research ==
Diamond's primary interests are in the mechanisms of central and peripheral tolerance of autoreactive B cells, and the defects in these mechanisms that are present in autoimmune disease, as well as the role of antibodies in brain disease. Diamond identified the first idiotype marker on anti-DNA antibodies in patients with lupus, and discovered that anti-DNA antibodies in patients and mice shared characteristics with antibodies to pneumococcal polysaccharide. Diamond showed that a single base change in a protective anti-pneumococcal antibody could convert it into a potentially pathogenic anti-DNA antibody. Additionally, she found that a peptide that binds to 50% of anti-DNA antibodies in lupus patients and mice represents an epitope on glutamate receptors of the brain and can destroy neurons. Antibodies against the epitope are present in the cerebrospinal fluid and in brain tissue of patients with neuropsychiatric lupus. Her work provided a mechanism for aspects of neuropsychiatric lupus, and more generally for acquired changes in cognition and behavior. Diamond also studies the role that hormones may play in the development of lupus.

== Selected awards and honors ==
- 2022, Presidential Gold Medal, American College of Rheumatology (ACR)
- 2022, Elected Member of the National Academy of Sciences
- 2022, Women in Medicine and Science Leadership Award, Association of American Medical Colleges (AAMC)
- 2011, Mentor Award, American College of Rheumatology
- 2008, Evelyn V. Hess research Award, Lupus Foundation of America, Inc.
- 2006, Member, Institute of Medicine
- 2006, Fellow, American Association for the Advancement of Science (AAAS)
- 2005, Klemperer award, American College of Rheumatology Institute of Medicine
- 2004, Recognition Award, National Association of MD-PhD Programs
- 2004, Einstein Honorary Alumni Award, Albert Einstein College of Medicine
- 2004, Klemperer Award New York Academy of Medicine and Arthritis Foundation (NY Chapter)
- 2002, Lee Howley Award, Arthritis Foundation
- 2001, Outstanding Investigator Award, American College of Rheumatology
- 2000, Scientific Leadership Award, SLE Lupus Foundation
