= John M. Kane =

American research psychiatrist specializing in the treatment of schizophrenia

John M. Kane is an American psychiatrist who served as the Chair of Psychiatry at the Zucker Hillside Hospital for 34 years. He also served as the Chair of Psychiatry at The Donald and Barbara Zucker School of Medicine at Hofstra/Northwell for its first 12 years. He stepped down from these roles in 2022 to focus his efforts on his research and mentorship of early career investigators as co-director, Institute of Behavioral Science at the Feinstein Institutes for Medical Research, part of Northwell Health.

Dr. Kane grew up in Westchester, NY, USA. He attended the Horace Mann School and Cornell University where he majored in English Literature. He attended medical school at New York University, and completed his psychiatry residency at the Hillside Hospital (now Zucker Hillside Hospital). Since beginning his residency in 1971, Dr. Kane's career has been focused on research in mental illnesses with a particular focus on schizophrenia.

Dr. Kane has been the recipient of numerous awards for his research including the Arthur P. Noyes Award in Schizophrenia, the American Psychiatric Association's Kempf Fund Award for Research Development in Psychobiological Psychiatry, Lieber Prize for Outstanding Research in Schizophrenia, and the Dean Award from the American College of Psychiatrists, among others.

Dr. Kane has been the principal investigator of 23 NIH grants focusing on different areas in schizophrenia research, including psychobiology and treatment, recovery, improving the quality and cost of care, and well as the utilization of digital technology.

He has published over 900 papers in scientific journals and has been consistently ranked by Thomson Reuters in the top 1% of researchers in his field based on citations of his work. He served as president of the Schizophrenia International Research Society, the American Society of Clinical Psychopharmacology, and the Psychiatric Research Society. He has chaired the NIMH Psychopathology and Psychobiology Review Committee and the FDA Psychopharmacologic Drugs Advisory Committee.

In honor of Dr. Kane's contributions to the field of psychiatry and research, a seminar titled: Addressing The Unconquerable World of Uncertainty: Research by Mentees of John Kane was held on May 14, 2022, featuring talks from many of Dr. Kane's current and former mentees from all over the world.
