= New York's 87th State Assembly district =

American legislative district

Assemblymember
Karines Reyes; D–Parkchester

New York's 87th State Assembly district is one of the 150 districts in the New York State Assembly. It has been represented by Democrat Karines Reyes since 2019.

== Geography ==
=== 2010s-present ===
District 87 is located in The Bronx, comprising portions of Parkchester, West Farms and Castle Hill. A portion of Bronx Park, containing the Bronx Zoo, is within this district.

The district is overlapped by New York's 14th and 15th congressional districts, as well as the 32nd, 33rd and 34th districts of the New York State Senate and the 13th, 15th, 17th and 18th districts of the New York City Council.

== Recent election results ==
=== 2026 ===
2026 New York State Assembly election, District 87
Primary election
Party	Candidate	Votes	%
Democratic	Karines Reyes (incumbent)	4,221	71.6
Democratic	Zakir Choudhury	1,654	28.1
Write-in		18	0.3
Total votes		5,893	100.0
General election
Democratic	Karines Reyes		
Working Families	Karines Reyes		
Total	Karines Reyes (incumbent)		
Conservative	Zenobia Merced-Bonilla		
People First	Zakir Choudhury		
Write-in			
Total votes			100.0

=== 2024 ===
2024 New York State Assembly election, District 87
Party	Candidate	Votes	%
Democratic	Karines Reyes	23,224	
Working Families	Karines Reyes	2,411	
Total	Karines Reyes (incumbent)	25,635	99.2
Write-in		208	0.8
Total votes		25,843	100.0
Democratic hold			

=== 2022 ===
2022 New York State Assembly election, District 87
Party	Candidate	Votes	%
Democratic	Karines Reyes	12,981	
Working Families	Karines Reyes	628	
Total	Karines Reyes (incumbent)	13,609	82.9
Republican	Ariel Rivera-Diaz	2,804	17.1
Write-in		11	0.0
Total votes		16,424	100.0
Democratic hold			

=== 2020 ===
2020 New York State Assembly election, District 87
Primary election
Party	Candidate	Votes	%
Democratic	Karines Reyes (incumbent)	8,954	78.5
Democratic	Garfield Holland	2,430	21.3
Write-in		17	0.2
Total votes		11,401	100.0
General election
Democratic	Karines Reyes	33,004	
Working Families	Karines Reyes	1,857	
Total	Karines Reyes (incumbent)	34,861	87.6
Republican	Michelle Castillo	4,014	10.1
Conservative	Juan DeJesus	658	1.7
Green	Carl Lundgren	224	0.6
Write-in		35	0.0
Total votes		39,792	100.0
Democratic hold			

=== 2018 ===
2018 New York State Assembly election, District 87
Primary election
Party	Candidate	Votes	%
Democratic	Karines Reyes	7,304	66.7
Democratic	John Perez	2,332	21.3
Democratic	Farah Despeignes	1,290	11.8
Write-in		20	0.2
Total votes		10,946	100.0
General election
Democratic	Karines Reyes	23,150	
Working Families	Karines Reyes	580	
Total	Karines Reyes	23,730	94.3
Republican	Alphaeus Marcus	1,196	4.8
Conservative	Michael Dennis	227	0.9
Write-in		18	0.0
Total votes		25,171	100.0
Democratic hold			

=== 2016 ===
2016 New York State Assembly election, District 87
Primary election
Party	Candidate	Votes	%
Democratic	Luis Sepúlveda (incumbent)	2,530	72.6
Democratic	Pamela Stewart-Martinez	947	27.2
Write-in		8	0.2
Total votes		3,485	100.0
General election
Democratic	Luis Sepúlveda	30,128	96.0
Conservative	Michael Dennis	1,218	3.9
Write-in		33	0.1
Total votes		31,379	100.0
Democratic hold			

=== 2014 ===
2014 New York State Assembly election, District 87
Party	Candidate	Votes	%
Democratic	Luis Sepúlveda	10,623	
Working Families	Luis Sepúlveda	472	
Total	Luis Sepúlveda (incumbent)	11,095	93.3
Republican	Michael Dennis	617	
Conservative	Michael Dennis	175	
Total	Michael Dennis	792	6.7
Write-in		10	0.0
Total votes		11,897	100.0
Democratic hold			

=== 2012 ===
2012 New York State Assembly election, District 87
Primary election
Party	Candidate	Votes	%
Democratic	Luis Sepúlveda	3,162	74.9
Democratic	Daniel Figueroa III	1,046	24.8
Write-in		11	0.3
Total votes		4,219	100.0
General election
Democratic	Luis Sepúlveda	28,179	
Working Families	Luis Sepúlveda	598	
Total	Luis Sepúlveda	28,777	96.9
Conservative	Michael Dennis	646	2.2
Green	Walter Nestler	276	0.9
Write-in		12	0.0
Total votes		29,711	100.0
Democratic hold			
