= Zucker School of Medicine =

Medical school of Hofstra University

Donald and Barbara Zucker School of Medicine at Hofstra/Northwell
- Type: Private medical school
- Established: 2008
- Dean: Lawrence G. Smith
- Students: 394
- Location: Hempstead, New York, U.S. 40.7176°N 73.5980°W
- Website: medicine.hofstra.edu

The Zucker School of Medicine is the medical school of Hofstra University in Hempstead on Long Island, in New York. The academic institution was established in 2008 by Hofstra University and the North Shore-LIJ Hospital system which was rebranded as Northwell Health in 2015.

== History ==
In October 2007, Hofstra University and Northwell Health (then known as North Shore-LIJ) announced plans to establish a new medical school: the first allopathic medical school in Nassau County, the first new medical school in the New York metropolitan area in more than 35 years, and the first in New York State since 1963. In March 2008, the parties executed a joint academic agreement establishing them as equal partners in launching the new school. In June 2010, the school was granted preliminary accreditation by the Liaison Committee on Medical Education (LCME), the accrediting body for U.S. medical education programs leading to the MD degree. Classes began in August 2011. In May 2015, the school's inaugural class graduated with 29 students; all received residencies to institutions across the U.S. Also in 2015, the school attained full accreditation.

In January 2016, the medical school changed its name from Hofstra North Shore-LIJ School of Medicine to Hofstra Northwell School of Medicine, reflecting the renaming of the health system to Northwell Health. In August 2017, after a $61 million donation to the school, it was renamed the Donald and Barbara Zucker School of Medicine at Hofstra/Northwell.

== Education ==
For students who have already earned a DDS or DMD degree, the school offers the MD curriculum for a six-year medical degree integrated and certificate training pathway in oral and maxillofacial surgery (MD/OMS).

In March 2015, the Hofstra University and Northwell partnership announced the launch of Hofstra Northwell School of Graduate Nursing and Physician Assistant Studies, offering Master of Science degrees. Hofstra's healthcare-professional education network also includes its School of Health Professions and Human Services.

In 2024, the Zucker School of Medicine was ranked a tier 1 med school by U.S. News & World Report and was one of only 16 med schools in the nation to receive this prestigious distinction. In 2025, the Zucker School of Medicine again received Tier 1 status in the U.S. News & World Report 2025 Best Medical Schools ranking.

Research is conducted by faculty and students at The Feinstein Institutes for Medical Research, Northwell's principal biomedical research facility.

=== Curriculum ===
The Zucker School of Medicine has 25 academic departments which includes Anesthesiology, Cardiology, Cardiovascular and Thoracic Surgery, Dental Medicine, Dermatology, Emergency Medicine, Family Medicine, Medicine, Molecular Medicine, Neurology, Neurosurgery, Obstetrics and Gynecology, Occupational Medicine, Epidemiology and Prevention, Ophthalmology, Orthopedic Surgery, Otolaryngology, Pathology and Laboratory Medicine, Pediatrics, Physical Medicine and Rehabilitation, Psychiatry, Radiation Medicine, Radiology, Science Education, Surgery, and Urology.

The school's programs include:

- Doctor of Medicine (MD)
- PhD in Molecular Basis of Medicine
- MD–PhD in Molecular Basis of Medicine
- 4+4 Program: BS-BA/MD (with Hofstra University)
- MD/MPH in Public Health (with the School of Health Sciences)
- MD/MBA in Business Administration (with the Frank G. Zarb School of Business)
- MD/OMS in Oral and Maxillofacial Surgery
- MD/MA in Clinical Bioethics
- MD/MS in Translation and Clinical Research

== Notable people ==
- Yousef Al-Abed, Professor of Molecular Medicine
- Lance Becker, Professor of Emergency Medicine
- Peter B. Berger, Professor of Cardiology
- Joel Block, Clinical Assistant Professor of Psychiatry
- Frank A. Chervenak, Professor of Obstetrics & Gynecology
- Barbara A. Cornblatt, Professor of Psychiatry
- Stephen Dolgin, Professor of Surgery
- Amos Grunebaum, Professor of Obstetrics & Gynecology
- David Langer, Professor of neurosurgery and radiology
- Thomas G. McGinn, Professor of Medicine
- Leonid Poretsky, Professor of Medicine
- Jesse Roth, Clinical Professor of Molecular Medicine
- David B. Samadi, Professor of urology
- Kevin J. Tracey, Professor of Molecular Medicine
