= Lawrence G. Smith =

Lawrence G. Smith is executive vice president and physician-in-chief of Northwell Health and the founding dean of Hofstra Northwell School of Medicine, in which the first class of students began its studies in August 2011.

Smith is the first recipient of the Lawrence Scherr, MD, Professorship of Medicine at Hofstra Northwell School of Medicine. He was honored with the 2008 Dema C. Daly Founders Award by the Association of Program Directors of Internal Medicine, of which he is a former president. He was also awarded the Solomon A. Berson Alumni Achievement Award in Health Science by the New York University School of Medicine.
