= Molecular Medicine (journal) =

- Discipline: Molecular medicine
- Language: English
- Edited by: Betty Diamond

Publication details
- History: 1994-present
- Publisher: Feinstein Institutes for Medical Research (United States)
- Frequency: Bimonthly
- Open access: Yes
- Impact factor: 6.354 (2021)

Standard abbreviations
- ISO 4: Mol. Med.

Indexing
- ISSN: 1076-1551 (print); 1528-3658 (web)

Links
- Journal homepage

Molecular Medicine is a peer-reviewed open access medical journal published by The Feinstein Institutes for Medical Research. It was established in 1994 by the Picower Institute for Medical Research, which had been established in 1991 by Anthony Cerami with funding from Jeffry Picower which was absorbed into Feinstein Institutes for Medical Research.

It is published in paper format six times annually. Manuscripts are posted online when they are accepted for publication. The journal covers research on the molecular pathogenesis of disease and translation of this knowledge into specific molecular tools for diagnosis, treatment, and prevention. It offers a biweekly podcast "Mollie Medcast", launched in 2007, which includes brief summaries of recent articles.

In 2013, Feinstein Institutes began giving an annual award named after Cerami through the journal; the winner receives $20,000 and the offer to publish an autobiographical piece about their research and what drives it in the journal.

As of 2014, the editor-in-chief is Betty Diamond. Molecular Medicine is indexed by PubMed and the Web of Science. According to the Journal Citation Reports, its 2013 impact factor is 4.824.
