= Poretsky (rural locality) =

Poretsky (Russian: Порецкий; masculine), Poretskaya (Порецкая; feminine), or Poretskoye (Порецкое; neuter) is the name of several rural localities in Russia:

- Poretskoye, Chuvash Republic, a selo in Poretskoye Rural Settlement of Poretsky District in the Chuvash Republic
- Poretskoye, Nizhny Novgorod Oblast, a village in Novomirsky Selsoviet of Vadsky District in Nizhny Novgorod Oblast
- Poretskoye, Penza Oblast, a village in Tsarevshchinsky Selsoviet of Mokshansky District in Penza Oblast
- Poretskoye, Ulyanovsk Oblast, a selo in Speshnevsky Rural Okrug of Kuzovatovsky District in Ulyanovsk Oblast
- Poretskoye, Vladimir Oblast, a selo in Suzdalsky District of Vladimir Oblast
