= Karines Reyes =

American politician (born 1985)

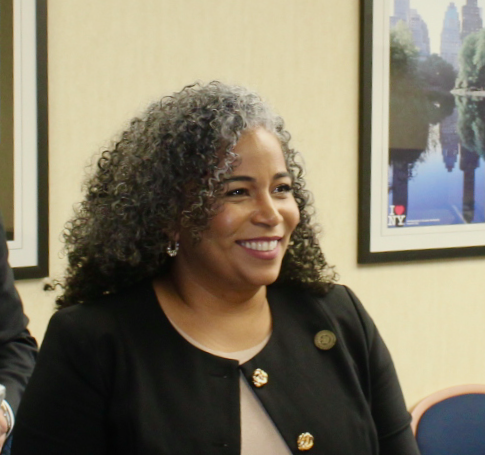

Member of the New York State Assembly from the 87th district
- Incumbent
- Assumed office January 9, 2019
- Preceded by: Luis R. Sepúlveda

Personal details
- Born: October 12, 1985 (age 40) Santo Domingo, Dominican Republic
- Party: Democratic
- Children: 2
- Education: Bronx Community College (AS); Chamberlain University (BS)
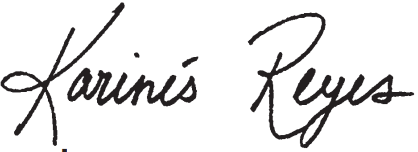
- Signature
- Website: Official website Campaign website

Karines Reyes is a Dominican-American politician and nurse from the state of New York. A Democrat, Reyes has represented the 87th district of the New York State Assembly, covering Parkchester and Castle Hill, since 2019.

== Career ==
Reyes was born in the Dominican Republic to a Dominican mother and a Puerto Rican father, and emigrated to the United States at age 6. She obtained her degree in nursing in 2013, and has worked as an oncology nurse at the Montefiore Medical Center since 2014.

== Electoral history ==
In June 2018, Reyes announced her campaign for the Assembly's 87th district, vacated by Luis R. Sepúlveda, who had been elected to the State Senate in a special election. After handily defeating two other Democrats in the September primary, Reyes won the general election against Republican Alpheaus Marcus with 94% of the vote.

== Personal life ==
Reyes lives in the Bronx with her two sons.
