= Amos Grunebaum =

American obstetrician and gynecologist

- עמוס גרונבאום
- Born: January 27, 1950 (age 76); Haifa, Israel
- Occupations: Gynecologist, obstetrician

Amos Grunebaum (Hebrew: עמוס גרונבאום; born January 27, 1950) is an American obstetrician and gynecologist. He serves as Professor of Obstetrics and Gynecology at the Zucker School of Medicine, as Professor Emeritus at the medical school Weill Cornell Medicine, and as a specialist in maternal-fetal medicine and high-risk pregnancies. He is also the founder of Babymed.com, which is a website for pregnant women and those trying to conceive, the site is up since 2000.

== Early life ==
He was born in Haifa, Israel, and raised in Germany. He received his M.D. in 1975 from the University of Cologne Medical School.

His post-doctoral positions include a residency in pathology at City Hospital Leverkusen in Germany, and residencies in anesthesia at Weyertal Hospital, Cologne in Germany and Maimonides Medical Center, Brooklyn, New York. He then had a residency in obstetrics and gynecology at SUNY Downstate Medical Center, Brooklyn, and finally a Fellowship in maternal-fetal medicine in the same SUNY facility.

== Career ==
For about 15 years, Grunebaum was director of obstetrics and maternal-fetal medicine at St. Luke's - Roosevelt Hospital Center, before accepting his faculty appointment at Weill Cornell Medical College of Cornell University in 2001. Until 2005 he was also the Director of the WebMD Fertility Center and in charge of the WebMD TTC (Trying To Conceive) message board.

Grunebaum still publishes many papers, including a 2017 study into the benefits and risks of placenta consumption, and has authored and co-authored many peer-reviewed, scientific articles, abstracts and book chapters.

He co-authored two books with sex therapist Dr. Ruth Westheimer (Dr. Ruth): "Sexually Speaking", and "Dr. Ruth's Pregnancy Guide for Couples". He also helped Rosie Pope write "Mommy IQ," where the two answer questions about pregnancy and fertility.

He has a presence in the online realm as the developer of BabyMed.com, which he launched in 2001. Through this platform, he shares his knowledge of pregnancy and fertility with couples trying to get pregnant, and features some online fertility tools and education. He also develops and markets products to aid in fertility, such as his patented FertilAid, which is a product aimed to provide the right doses of vitamins, minerals, and antioxidants to help conduce successful conception.

Grunebaum also has a media presence as a television personality and actor. He played Marisa Tomei's obstetrician in the movie The Paper. He's also appeared on CNN, ABC, NBC, CBS, FOX, and the Charlie Rose Show, as well as various news programs on public television. Grunebaum has been named as a New York Super Doctor for several years.

A 2023 paper by Grunebaum, which reviewed the care of nine million babies, was published in the Journal of Perinatal Medicine; the report showed that non-white babies were given lower Apgar scores than white babies, as their darker skin color often results in lower scores on the appearance measure, making them more likely to receive medical care that might not be needed.
