= Luis R. Sepúlveda =

American attorney and politician (born 1964)

Luis Sepúlveda
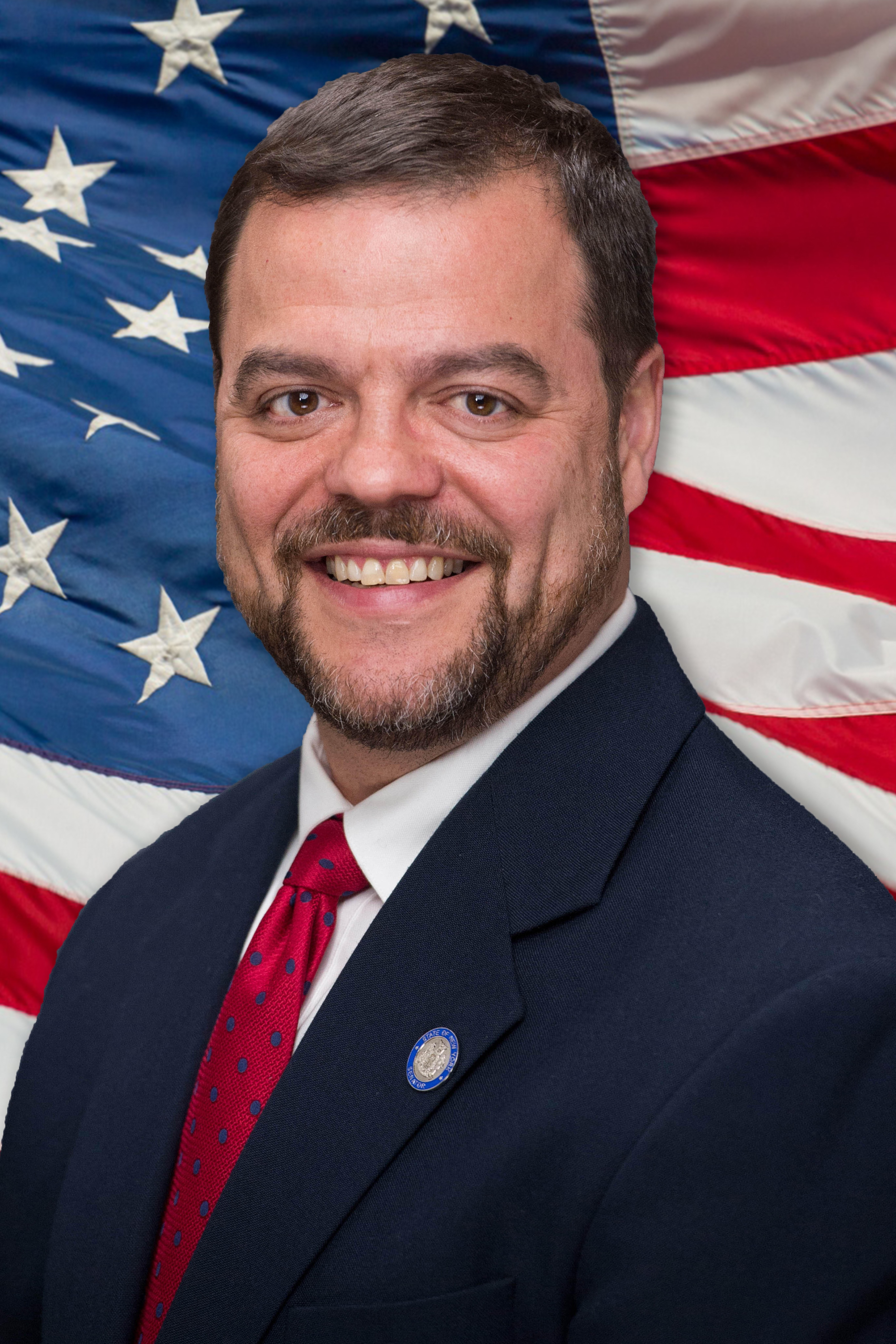

Member of the New York State Senate from the 32nd district
- Incumbent
- Assumed office April 30, 2018
- Preceded by: Rubén Díaz

Member of the New York State Assembly from the 87th district
- In office January 1, 2013 – April 25, 2018
- Preceded by: J. Gary Pretlow
- Succeeded by: Karines Reyes

Personal details
- Born: February 11, 1964 (age 62) Brooklyn, New York, U.S.
- Party: Democratic
- Spouse: Milagros Sepulveda
- Children: 2
- Education: Hofstra University (BA, JD)
- Website: State Senate website

Luis R. Sepúlveda (born February 11, 1964) is an American attorney and politician who currently serves as the New York State Senator from the 32nd Senate District, which includes parts of the Bronx. Prior to being in the state senate Sepúlveda was a member of the New York State Assembly from 2013 to 2018.

Sepúlveda is a close ally of Bill de Blasio, being the first assembly member to endorse him in his 2013 and 2017 mayoral runs.

In January 2021, Sepúlveda turned himself in and was arrested and charged with assault, criminal obstruction of breathing, and harassment, but the charges were later dropped after prosecutors determined that there was a lack of evidence to proceed to trial.

== Early life and education ==
Sepúlveda was born in Brooklyn, New York, and graduated from Hofstra University, in Hempstead, New York, with a Bachelor of Arts degree in the natural sciences in 1988. Sepúlveda later attended the Maurice A. Deane School of Law at Hofstra on a full scholarship, obtaining his J.D. degree in 1991.

== Career ==
In 2010, Sepúlveda made his first run for public office, losing a bid for the New York State Assembly to incumbent Peter M. Rivera in the Democratic primary. Two years later, Rivera retired and Sepúlveda was elected as his successor for the 87th Assembly District. He would be re-elected twice more.

During Sepúlveda's 2012 run, the Stonewall Democratic Club of New York City endorsed Sepúlveda, even though he did not support same-sex marriage equality, over his opponent Danny Figueroa, who did. In response to controversy, Sepúlveda wrote a letter stating that "The passing of the Same-Sex Marriage bill in New York State is a settled matter, one that I do not look to chip at in any capacity as a state legislator."

Sepúlveda has a history of endorsing populist and progressive candidates. Sepúlveda was the first member of the Assembly to endorse future New York City Mayor Bill de Blasio in the 2013 New York City Mayoral primary elections as well as the first Assembly member to endorse de Blasio in his 2017 reelection campaign.

He was one of the few New York State politicians to back Vermont Senator Bernie Sanders in the 2016 Democratic Primary over former New York Senator Hillary Clinton. He endorsed Sanders again for the 2020 Primary.

However, in 2018, Sepúlveda supported incumbent state senator Martin Malave Dilan against a primary challenge from Julia Salazar, a community organizer endorsed by the Democratic Socialists of America, and endorsed former Independent Democratic Conference leader Jeffrey D. Klein against challenger Alessandra Biaggi.

=== New York State Assembly ===
While in the Assembly from 2013 to 2018, Sepúlveda served on the Assembly's Committees on Aging, Agriculture, Banks, Correction, Mental Hygiene, and Housing. Sepúlveda also served as the chair of the Subcommittee on Transitional Services, dealing with post-incarceration issues.

Sepúlveda's chief of staff, Russian-born Anton Konev, arranged a 2017 fact-finding trip to Russia for a group of state legislators, including Sepúlveda, to discuss urban issues such as congestion and homelessness. The trip was controversial, coming in the wake of allegations against Russia interfering with the 2016 US Presidential election.

=== New York State Senate ===
In 2017, longtime Senator Rubén Díaz Sr. opted to run for the New York City Council, and won. A special election was announced to replace him, and Sepúlveda announced his candidacy on December 18, 2017. Sepúlveda would easily win the endorsement of the county Democratic party, and in the overwhelmingly Democratic district, easily won the special election.

Sepúlveda was elected to a full term in 2018 unopposed. In the Senate, he is serving as Chairman of the Crime Victims, Crime and Correction Committee. Sepúlveda sponsored the New York State Driver's License Access and Privacy Act, also known as the "Green Light" bill.

Sepúlveda was elected in 2020 and faced no major party opposition.

In support of Kathy Hochul's nomination of Hector LaSalle as chief judge of the New York Court of Appeals, Sepúlveda spoke at a press conference, saying that "I don't care if this fight costs me my political career. This is the hill I'm gonna die on."

In January 2026, Luis Sepulveda was appointed chair of the New York State Senate Judiciary Committee (replacing Brad Hoylman-Sigal).

== Alleged domestic violence ==
In 2015, Sepúlveda's wife requested an order of protection against him after she alleged that an argument between them turned violent. A restraining order was never issued.

In 2021, the police responded to a 911 call from Sepúlveda's wife. When the police arrived, both Sepúlveda and his wife claimed the other had assaulted them. Later, Sepúlveda turned himself in and was arrested for allegedly assaulting his wife, and was charged with assault in the 3rd degree, criminal obstruction of breathing, and harassment. Prosecutors dropped charges in August of that year.

Following these incidents, Andrea Stewart-Cousins removed Sepúlveda from his committee chairmanship of the Crime Victims Committee and Crime and Correction Committee, and elected officials like Nathalia Fernandez and Rob Ortt called on him to resign if the allegations were true.

== No Show to Court ==
Sepulveda, as a defense lawyer representing tenants, did not appear in court to represent at least 4 clients in 2026. Majority leader Andrea Stewart Cousins appointed him the chair of the New York State Senate's Judiciary Committee. Some people say Sepulveda should not be an active lawyer in cases where the judge presiding over the cases are influenced by the state senator's power as judiciary chair.

== See also ==
- List of members of the New York State Senate
- List of members of the New York State Assembly
- List of Hofstra University alumni
- List of people from Brooklyn, New York
- List of people from the Bronx
- List of Bernie Sanders presidential campaign endorsements, 2016
