= Kenneth S. Warren =

American global medical health researcher (1929–1996)

- Born: June 11, 1929; Brooklyn, New York, US
- Died: September 18, 1996 (aged 67); Dobbs Ferry, New York, US
- Education: Harvard University, Harvard Medical School
- Occupations: Scientist and Physician
- Known for: Medical Research
- Spouse: Sylvia Warren
- Children: Christopher and Erica Warren

Kenneth S. Warren (June 11, 1929 – September 18, 1996) was an American scientist, physician, educator and public health advocate. He was an expert on tropical disease, in particular schistosomiasis.

== Early life ==
Warren was born in Brooklyn, New York City in 1929. He earned his bachelor's degrees in history and literature at Harvard University in 1950 and his M.D. from Harvard Medical School in 1955. Warren then went on to the National Institutes of Health as a researcher before completing postgraduate work at the London School of Hygiene & Tropical Medicine.

== Career ==
Warren taught on the faculty of Case Western Reserve University from 1963 to 1977 both in the school of medicine and in library science. In 1977, he joined the Rockefeller Foundation as director of health services, where he worked for the next ten years. His last years were spent as the director of science at Maxwell Communication Corporation and then at Picower Institute for Medical Research.

Warren traveled the globe studying and lending his expertise to strengthen and promote global health, focusing primarily on tropical medicine, the developing world, and the "Great Neglected Diseases of Mankind." Throughout his career, Dr. Warren published some 200 scientific papers on the subject of tropical diseases such as schistosomiasis, malaria, and hookworm.

== Cochrane's Kenneth Warren Prize ==
In the year 2000, the Kenneth Warren Prize was established through individual and institutional donations to honor Kenneth Warren’s enduring commitment to global health and research equity. First awarded at the 8th Cochrane Colloquium in Cape Town, South Africa, the Prize is presented annually to the principal author who must be a national of a developing country, of a Cochrane Review recognized for its methodological rigor and relevance to health issues affecting low- and middle-income countries. The award includes a certificate, a monetary prize of US $1000, and full coverage of travel, accommodation, and conference registration costs to support attendance at the Cochrane Colloquium. In recognition of their achievements, recipients are also invited to serve on the Prize Committee to help identify future awardees.

The list of the Kenneth Warren Prize Awardees include:

2000 Marissa Alejandria, University of the Philippines, Manila, Philippines. Anelise Lima, Federal University of Pelotas, Brazil.

2001 Manit Srisurapanont, Chiang Mai University, Thailand

2002 Prathap Tharyan, Christian Medical College, Vellore, India

2003 Maurício Silva de Lima, Federal University of Pelotas, Brazil

2004 George Swingler, University of Cape Town, South Africa

2005 Marilla Lucero, Research Institute for Tropical Medicine, Muntinlupa City, Philippines

2006 Jonathan Ipser, MRC Research Unit for Anxiety and Stress Disorders, University of Stellenbosch, South Africa

2007 Gawrie Galappaththy, Ministry of Health, Colombo, Sri Lanka

2008 Martin Meremikwu, University of Calabar, Nigeria

2009 Nandi Siegfried, South African Cochrane Centre, South African Medical Research Council, Tygerberg, South Africa

2010 Prince Christopher, Cochrane Infectious Diseases Group and Christian Medical College, Vellore, India

2011 Zohra Lassi, Cochrane Pregnancy and Childbirth Group and Aga Khan University Hospital, Karachi, Pakistan

2012 Don Mathanga, Cochrane Infectious Diseases Group and University of Malawi, Malaria Alert Center, College of Medicine, Blantyre, Malawi

2013 Charles Okwundu, Cochrane HIV/AIDS Group and Stellenbosch University, Centre for Evidence-Based Health Care, Tygerberg, South Africa

2014 Babalwa Zani, Cochrane Infectious Diseases Group and South African Cochrane Centre, Cape Town, South Africa

2015 Anju Sinha, Cochrane Neonatal Group, India

2016 Ravindra Prabhu

2017 Ahizechukwu Eke, Johns Hopkins University School of Medicine, Baltimore, Maryland, US

2018 Nai Ming Lai

2019 No prize awarded

2020 Nishant Jaiswal

2021 Siew Cheng Foong

2022 Eleanor Ochodo-Opondo

2023 Rashmi Ranjan
