= Fred DeMatteis School of Engineering and Applied Science =

Academic division within Hofstra University

Coordinates: 40°42′54″N 73°36′0″W

- Seal of the House of Orange-Nassau coat of arms
- Other names: Hofstra SEAS
- Former names: Hofstra School of Engineering and Applied Science
- Type: Private engineering school
- Established: 2012
- Parent institution: Hofstra University
- Dean: Sina Rabbany
- Location: Hempstead, New York, United States
- Website: www.hofstra.edu/seas

The Fred DeMatteis School of Engineering and Applied Science (SEAS) is the engineering school of Hofstra University, a private university in Hempstead, New York. It was created in 2012 out of the previously existing Departments of Engineering and Computer Science. It is accredited by ABET.

== History ==
An Engineering Science program first emerged in the early 1960s from a previous program offering the first two years of an engineering education to be completed at either Columbia University or Polytechnic Institute of Brooklyn (now NYU Tandon School of Engineering). By 1963, several four-year degree options were being offered within a B.S. Engineering Science, including specializations in engineering science, engineering mechanics, engineering electronics, and industrial engineering. In 1965, Adams Hall, a new mathematics and science building was completed. By the early 1970s, the B.S. Industrial Engineering had become a separate degree, and evening part-time B.S. programs were available in Aerospace Engineering, Electrical Engineering and Engineering Mechanics. The B.S. in Engineering Science became the first engineering program at Hofstra to earn accreditation in 1971, and remained the only accredited program until the mid-1980s. In 1983, the degree title changed from a B.S. to a B.E., and after being established as separate programs in the 1984–85 academic year, the B.S. Electrical Engineering and B.S. Mechanical Engineering programs received their initial accreditations in 1988. Over the last 25 years, Civil and Biomedical Options have served as the two routes to a degree in the Engineering Science program. Likewise, the Department of Computer Science has offered B.A. and B.S. degrees since the 1960s. A separate B.S. degree in Computer Engineering has been offered since 2003. A new B.S. degree in Cybersecurity was introduced in 2018. M.A. and M.S. degrees have been offered by the department since the 1980s and the 1990s respectively.

In 2012, the two departments became the constituent members of the School of Engineering and Applied Science. The school was formally named the Fred DeMatteis School of Engineering and Applied Science on October 20, 2016. In 2017, the B.S. Bioengineering, B.S. Civil Engineering and B.S. Computer Science and Cybersecurity programs were created, and in 2019, the M.S. Cybersecurity and the M.S. Engineering Management were inaugurated.

== Ranking ==
According to U.S. News & World Report data released in September 2024, Hofstra's DeMatteis School of Engineering and Applied Science is situated in the top 11% of non-PhD granting engineering schools throughout the United States, ranking 30th out of 286 schools.

== Academics ==
The school is distinguished by its emphasis on undergraduate teaching, with close to 800 undergraduates matriculating in the fall of 2019, served by a full-time faculty of approximately 30, and select adjuncts who are professionals in industry. Approximately 60 graduate students are enrolled in the various graduate programs. A co-op program initiated in the spring of 2015 offers upper level students the opportunity to work full-time for six to eight months at competitive salaries for one of over 200 high-tech companies, mainly in the New York metropolitan area.

A robust summer research program, with funding for undergraduates, is available in a variety of subject areas. The Center for Innovation, a program operating in SEAS, offers solutions to technical problems brought to its attention by industries, but with the industry maintaining all intellectual property rights. Largely operated by current SEAS faculty, it also offers opportunities for students to work on practical projects.

=== Department of Engineering ===
The Department of Engineering offers bachelor's programs in electrical engineering, mechanical engineering, engineering science, bioengineering, civil engineering, and industrial engineering, and all are ABET-accredited. It also offers a master's program in engineering management. The Engineering Department has affiliations with several professional associations, including ASCE, ASME, ASEE, AIAA, IEEE, and IISE. Notable alumni include Michael P. Delaney, VP of Digital Transformation of the Boeing Company, who also directed the 787 program.

=== Department of Computer Science ===
The Department of Computer Science offers ABET accredited B.S. degrees in programs in computer science and computer engineering within the DeMatteis School. The department offers additional B.S. and B.A. programs at the undergraduate level and M.S. Computer Science, M.S. Cybersecurity, and M.S. Data Science programs at the graduate level. Notable alumni include Mike Seiman '01, founder and CEO of CPXi, a digital media company he started while still attending Hofstra and Thomas Sanzone '82, former CEO of Black Knight Financial Services.

== Facilities ==
Hofstra SEAS resides in Adams Hall, Weed Hall, and the Science and Innovation Center (SIC). The school maintains the following laboratories, among others:

- Electronics
- Advance Communication
- Architecture and Embedded Systems
- Big Data – contains a data center that hosts clusters
- Cell and Tissue Engineering
- Cybersecurity Innovation and Research Center – a $1.3 million facility consisting of a 'war room' and datacenter
- Robotics and Advanced Manufacturing
- Aerodynamics and Transfer Phenomena
- Ultrasound Research
- Systems and Graphics
- Linux Lab
- Materials Analysis

Several of these laboratories were created or enhanced through a $12 million upgrade of the facilities. The Big Data Laboratory and Robotics Laboratory were funded through $2 million in grants from New York State. In June 2021, Hofstra University broke ground on a $75 million Science and Innovation Center for use by the school, funded in part by a $25 million state grant.
