= Feinstein Institutes for Medical Research =

Medical research lab in New York

The Feinstein Institutes for Medical Research
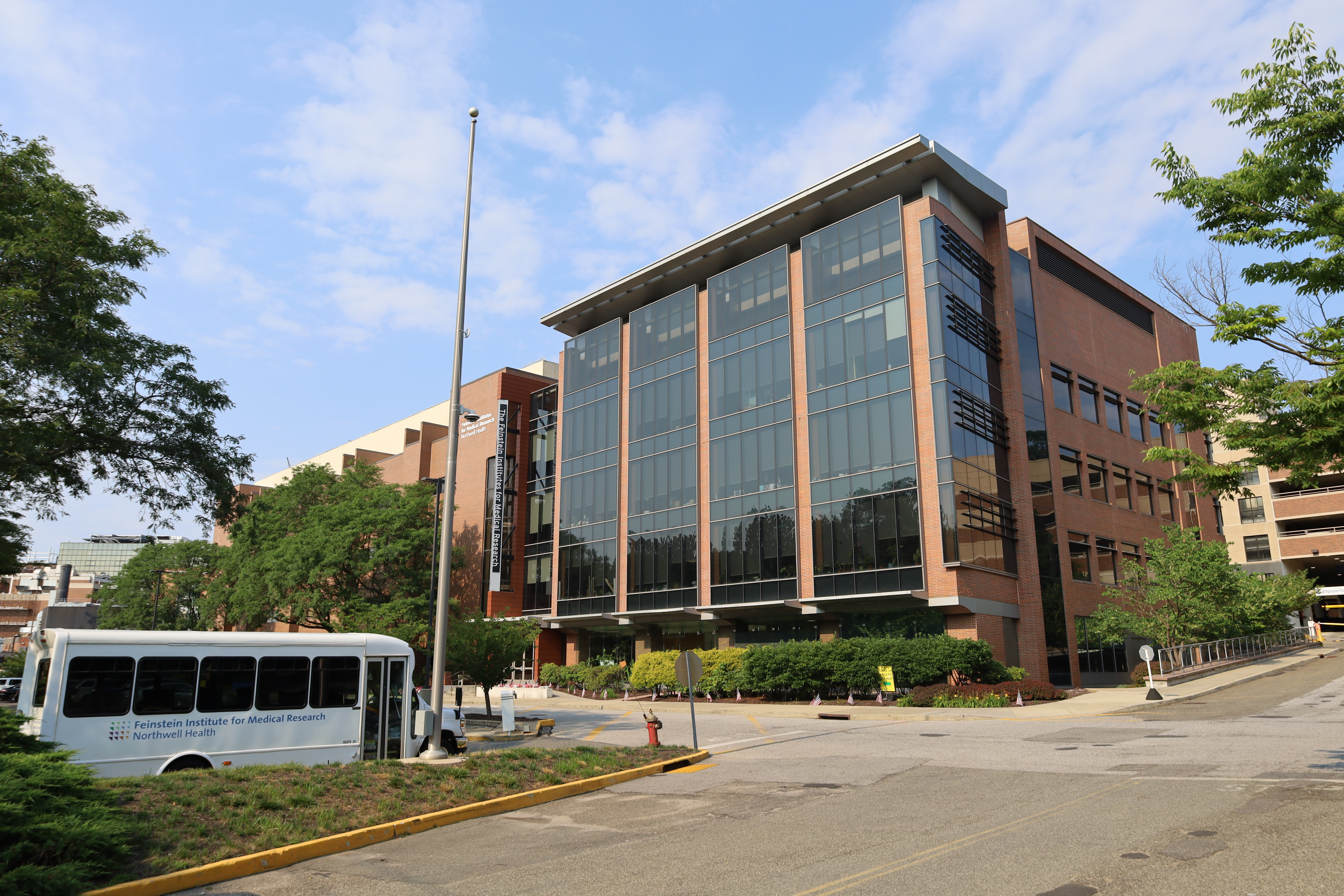
- Established: 1999
- Chairperson: Lewis Ranieri, Scott Rechler
- President: Kevin J. Tracey
- Vice-chair: Jack J. Ross
- Total staff: 5,000
- Location: Manhasset, New York, United States
- Website: feinstein.northwell.edu

The Feinstein Institutes for Medical Research in Manhasset, New York, United States, on Long Island, is the research home of Northwell Health. Feinstein Institutes is home to 50 research labs, 2,500 clinical research studies, and 5,000 professional and support staff. The faculty includes a members of the National Academy of Sciences, Betty Diamond, the National Academy of Medicine: Lance B. Becker and Karina Davidson, the American Society for Clinical Investigation, and the Association of American Physicians. Feinstein Institutes' scientists conduct research in molecular medicine, genetics, cancer, neuroscience, behavioral science, and bioelectronic medicine, among others. Feinstein Institutes is the laboratory and faculty home of the Elmezzi Graduate School of Molecular Medicine. Students with an MD degree may earn a PhD in molecular medicine.

== History ==
The Feinstein Institutes was established in 1999 as The Institute for Medical Research at North Shore-LIJ, acquiring assets from the Picower Institute for Medical Research when it ceased operations. The Institutes are research home of the North Shore-Long Island Jewish Health System, which rebranded as Northwell Health in 2015.

In 2003, U.S. Senator Hillary Clinton presented the North Shore-LIJ General Clinical Research Center (now known as Feinstein Institutes) with a $15 million grant from the National Institutes of Health.

Board member Leonard Feinstein, co-founder of Bed Bath & Beyond, made a $25 million gift that led to the institute being renamed as The Feinstein Institutes for Medical Research in 2005. That same year, Kevin J. Tracey, MD was appointed President of the Feinstein Institutes and took the place of CEO in January 2006. In 2017, Feinstein and his wife, Susan, committed another $25 million to the Institutes.

Feinstein publishes two open-access, international peer-reviewed medical journals in partnership with BioMed Central, part of Springer Nature: Molecular Medicine and Bioelectronic Medicine.

Beginning in 2013, the Feinstein Institutes annually bestow two academic awards: the Anthony Cerami Award in Translational Medicine and the Ross Prize in Molecular Medicine. Most notably, the 2022 Ross Prize winners were Katalin Kariko, PhD and Drew Weissman, MD, PhD, both of whom were awarded the 2023 Nobel Prize in Physiology or Medicine. In conjunction with the prize, the Institutes host an annual Ross Prize in Molecular Medicine Symposium where the winner presents the keynote lecture.

In 2022, the National Institutes of Health (NIH), granted the Institutes $3.8 million to study the effects of radiation on the body's immune system. This research was led by the Institutes’ co-principal investigators Dr. Ping Wang, Dr. Max Brenner, and Dr. Monowar Aziz. Dr. Ping Wang received an additional $2.5 million from the NIH to further his research on sepsis.

In April 2024, the Feinstein Institutes were awarded a grant of $6.1 million from the NIH for three research projects on red cell disorders.

In July 2024, the Feinstein Institutes for Medical Research hosted its 19th annual Summer Concert, headlined by Gwen Stefani. The event raised $3.6 million to support scientific discovery.

In 2025, Northwell Health launched its first clinical Center for Bioelectronic Medicine, continuing the research performed by the Feinstein Institutes for Medical Research. The center's efforts include developing therapies that use nerve stimulation techniques, such as targeting the vagus nerve, to address chronic conditions like rheumatoid arthritis.

Feinstein Institutes' journals. Molecular Medicine and Bioelectronic Medicine, have both received updated impact factors. Molecular Medicine's increased to a factor of 8.3 and Bioelectronic Medicine received its first impact factor of 6.4.

== Organization and administration ==
In 2024, the Feinstein Institutes for Medical Research comprise the following six institutes:

- Institute of Behavioral Science, led by John Kane, MD and Anil K. Malhotra, MD.
- Institute of Bioelectronic Medicine, led by Yousef Al-Abed, PhD and Lopa Mishra, MD.
- Institute of Molecular Medicine, led by Betty Diamond, MD.
- Institute of Cancer Research, led by Tobias Janowitz, MD, PhD.
- Institute of Health Systems Science, led by Karina W. Davidson, PhD, MASc.
- Institute of Translational Research, led by Douglas F. Nixon, MD, PhD

== Academics ==
=== Contemporary research ===
In 2002, CEO Kevin Tracey, published a research article on what he calls the inflammatory reflex. Ten years later, another research study published by the Institutes’ own Valentin Pavlov and Kevin Tracey revisits the topic of inflammatory reflex to investigate its relationship to the vagus nerve and how it relates to immune function and metabolic homeostasis. There is now a better understanding of potential therapeutic approaches for treating inflammatory-related conditions.

In 2020, under Karina Davidson’s leadership, the Feinstein Institutes received a $1.7 million grant from the National Institute on Aging to study the impact behavior change interventions may have on the physical activity of older adults. Davidson has also assisted the Institutes in publishing over 250 peer-reviewed, published medical studies.

Dr. Jesse Roth of the Feinstein Institutes for Medical Research was recognized in 2021 by the Journal of Clinical Investigation as one of the “Giants in Medicine” for his work in treating diabetes. Having been with the Institutes since 2000, Dr. Roth has worked to understand the insulin in both the brain and nervous system.

A 2023 study led by Institutes’ researcher, Haicho Wang, focused on protein detection that may be able to fight against lethal infections within the body. The study's findings paved the way for new monoclonal antibody therapies to be used in translational clinical trials as treatment for sepsis.

In 2024, the Feinstein Institutes for Medical Research published a study in Circulation Research on preclinical models using splenic focused ultrasound stimulation (sFUS). The study demonstrated that sFUS can reduce inflammation and alleviate symptoms of pulmonary arterial hypertension (PAH), a condition for which no cure currently exists. That same year the company began working on new endometriosis research that aims to develop a non-invasive FDA-approved method for diagnosing the medical condition.

A large-scale study by the Feinstein Institutes found that liquid thickening does not benefit elderly patients with dementia who have swallowing difficulties. Analyzing the medical records of 9,000 patients with an average age of 86, the study found no significant impact on length of stay, readmission rates, or mortality. While patients consuming thickened liquids were less likely to require ventilators, they were more prone to developing pneumonia and other respiratory complications.

Researchers at the Feinstein Institutes for Medical Research conducted a study on the mechanisms of sepsis-induced liver injury, reporting evidence of gut-liver cellular interactions that may contribute to organ damage during sepsis.

=== Double neural bypass ===
The Feinstein Institutes for Medical Research's Double Neural Bypass tool, developed by Professor Chad Bouton and his team, combines microchips implanted in the brain's motor and sensory areas with AI algorithms to restore movement and sensation in individuals with paralysis. Keith Thomas, paralyzed since 2020, became the first participant in the Institutes’ clinical trial in 2023 and has since reportedly regained movement and sensation.

=== iNav ===
The Institutes’ iNav, an AI detection system developed by Dr. Daniel King, Dr. Sandeep Nadella, and Tiffany Zavadsky, analyzes over 10,000 Northwell patient scan reports each week. The system identifies scans with a high risk of pancreatic cancer, reducing time-to-treatment by 50% and boosting enrollment in clinical research studies.

=== COVID-19 ===
During the COVID-19 pandemic, lead researcher Alex Spyropoulos, ran a clinical trial to determine the proper anticoagulant dosage for patients with COVID-19 who were on a ventilator and at high risk for organ failure.

The Feinstein Institutes partnered with Gilead Sciences, Regeneron Pharmaceuticals, and Sanofi in March 2020 to conduct three different clinical trials to find treatments for COVID-19.

=== Elmezzi Graduate School of Molecular Medicine ===
The Elmezzi Graduate School of Molecular Medicine works in collaboration with the Feinstein Institutes for Medical Research. The Feinstein Institutes provide the school with all facilities and faculty for operation.

== Awards and recognitions ==
The Feinstein Institutes have earned 2 spots in the Times Best Inventions of 2024 for their iNav and Double Neural Bypass.

Three Feinstein Institutes for Medical Research doctors received recognition in the 2024 American Society of Clinical Oncology (ASCO) Foundation Conquer Cancer awards. Dr. Daniel King received a Career Development Award (CDA) and Young Investigator Awards (YIA) were given to both Dr. Stephanie Boisclair and Dr. Nicholas Hornstein.

Carlos Bravo-Iniguez of the Feinstein Institutes for Medical Research was recognized as a STAT Wunderkind for 2024.

In May 2024, at EndoFound’s Blossom Ball, Feinstein Institutes’ Dr. Christine Metz and Dr. Peter Gregersen received the annual Women's Reproductive Health and Endometriosis Industry Award.

== Support services and cores ==
Feinstein has the standard support services and scientific cores to support basic research. Support includes:

- Animal Welfare Office - IACUC & IBC
- Biostatistics Unit
- Center for Comparative Physiology
- Center for Research Informatics & Innovation
- Environmental Health & Safety Office
- Human Research Protection Program
- Office of Clinical Research
- Office of Intellectual Assets Management
- Office of Research Compliance
- Office of Research Policy & Training

The cores include:

- Flow Cytometry Core
- Microscopy Core
- Molecular Biology Core Facility
- Nursing Core
- Quantitative PCR Core Facility

== Multimillion-dollar fine ==
In 2016, the Feinstein Institutes for Medical Research agreed to pay the U.S. Department of Health and Human Services, Office for Civil Rights (OCR), $3.9 million to settle potential violations of the Health Insurance Portability and Accountability Act of 1996 (HIPAA) privacy and security rules and to undertake a substantial corrective action plan to bring its operations into compliance.
