= Lance Becker =

American physician and academic (born 1954)

Lance B. Becker
- Occupation: Physician-Scientist

Academic background
- Education: University of Illinois College of Medicine

Academic work
- Discipline: Emergency medicine
- Institutions: North Shore University Hospital, Hofstra Northwell School of Medicine

Lance Bert Becker M.D. FAHA (born 1954) is an American emergency physician and researcher. His work has been in resuscitation science, particularly in the realms of cardiac arrest management, therapeutic hypothermia, therapies for reperfusion injury, and mitochondrial medicine.

== Early life and education ==
Becker earned his undergraduate degree at the University of Michigan and his M.D. from the University of Illinois. He completed his residency at Michael Reese Hospital and Medical Center, in Chicago, IL.

== Personal life ==
Becker is married with two adult children, one of whom is also a physician-scientist.

== Career and contributions ==
=== Early career ===
Becker began his career as an attending physician at Michael Reese hospital in Chicago in 1984, after which he became an assistant professor of medicine at the University of Chicago. At the University of Chicago, he founded and directed the Emergency Resuscitation Center.

=== Mid-career ===
In 2006 he accepted an appointment at the University of Pennsylvania, where he would hold a triple appointment in the following departments: Emergency Medicine at the Hospital of the University of Pennsylvania; Clinical Studies in Veterinary Science at the School of Veterinary Medicine; and the Center for Mitochondrial and Epigenomic Medicine Children's Hospital at the University of Pennsylvania (CHOP). At Penn, he founded and directed the Center for Resuscitation Science.

=== Present day ===
In 2015, he accepted a position at Northwell Health, where he is chair of emergency medicine across a 23-hospital system, the largest in New York State. The emergency departments collectively care for nearly a million visits per year, or about 30% of all the visits in the state of New York. He also serves as the emergency medicine chair for the Zucker School of Medicine at Northwell/Hofstra. Becker leads an active lab group working on advanced therapies for resuscitation, mitochondrial medicine, and bioenergetic medicine through Northwell's Feinstein Institutes for Medical Research.

== Research ==
Becker has dedicated his career to advancing patient outcomes in cardiac arrest and critical care scenarios. His research has focused on several main areas:

--Cardiac arrest survival rates, epidemiology, and national guidelines for CPR.

--Urban cardiac arrest survival rates, particularly racial disparities in survivorship and community survival rates.

--Improving Cardiopulmonary Resuscitation (CPR) and AED use: Becker's research initiatives encompass novel approaches to CPR. His studies have explored strategies for optimizing chest compressions, introduced concepts of hemodynamic-directed CPR, and highlighted the critical impact of CPR quality on patient survival and neurological recovery.

--Therapeutic Hypothermia: Becker's work in therapeutic hypothermia has been transformative in clinical practice. He has significantly advanced the understanding and utilization of hypothermia as a neuroprotective strategy for patients post-cardiac arrest, improving survival rates and neurological outcomes.

--Basic fundamental science underpinning the cellular mechanisms of why and when do cells die and what we could do to prevent cell death. Reactive oxygen species biology, reperfusion injury, drugs and combinations of drugs to prevent reperfusion injury and cell death following ischemia, including the use of hydrogen gas, mitochondrial resuscitation, most recently mitochondrial transplantation.

--Bioenergetic Medicine: In recent years Becker has focused heavily on the emergent field of bioenergetic medicine and its potential in cardiac arrest and stroke treatment. His work on the impact of resuscitation on mitochondrial function have provided invaluable insights into cellular responses during cardiac arrest and reperfusion injury, offering potential avenues for targeted therapeutic interventions, including mitochondrial transplantation.

== Notable research and publications ==
Becker has published over 300 peer-reviewed publications.

== Patents ==
Becker's collaborative efforts with colleagues have resulted in numerous patented inventions. These patents span a wide spectrum of innovations, covering phase-change materials, ice particulate slurries, methods for inducing hypothermia, non-invasive monitoring of organ function, combinations of drugs (i.e. cocktails) designed to reduce reperfusion injury and improve neurological function after ischemia, and more.

== Professional affiliations and recognition ==
Becker holds membership in numerous medical and scientific organizations, and is an elected member of the Institute of Medicine and National Academy of Medicine (IOM/NAM), the American Heart Association and the American College of Emergency Physicians. He has been the recipient of numerous accolades and awards, such as the Lifetime Achievement Award in Cardiac Resuscitation Science from the American Heart Association in 2012.
