= Joel Block =

American psychiatrist, psychologist, and sex therapist

Joel D. Block (born 1943) is a psychologist and author on relationships and sexuality. Block is an assistant clinical professor of psychiatry at Hofstra Northwell School of Medicine. He is also a senior psychologist at Northwell Health, where he was the training supervisor of the hospital's Sexuality Center for twenty years, until 2002.

== Early life and education ==
Block was born in 1943 in Brooklyn, New York, and later attended the State University of New York Upstate Medical University, where he obtained a Bachelor of Science in Education/Psychology in 1970. He obtained a Master of Science degree in psychology, and later went on to obtain his doctorate in psychology from Syracuse University. He also undertook a one-year postdoctoral fellowship in Cognitive Behavioral Therapy from the Albert Ellis Institute.

== Author ==
Block's books include:

- The Other Man, The Other Woman: Understanding and Coping with Extramarital Affairs, Grosset & Dunlap, 1978ISBN 0-448-14568-5
- To Marry Again, Grosset & Dunlap, 1979 ISBN 0-448-16420-5
- Friendship, Macmillan, 1983
- Secrets of Better Sex, Parker/Simon & Schuster, 1996, ISBN 0-7352-0283-4
- The Romance of Sex, Parker/Simon & Schuster, 1997, ISBN 0-7607-2098-3
- Sex Over 50, Parker/Simon & Schuster, 1999, (updated and reissued, 2008), ISBN 0-399-53436-9
- Broken Promises, Mended Hearts: Maintaining Trust in Love Relationships, Contemporary/McGraw-Hill, 2000,ISBN 0-8092-2398-8
- Step-living for Teens, Adams Media, 2001
- Mommy or Daddy, Whose side Am I On, Adams Media, 2002, ISBN 1-58062-605-X
- Naked Intimacy: How to Increase True Openness in Your Relationship, Contemporary/McGraw-Hill, October 2002,ISBN 0-07-139518-0
- Staying Cool: A Teen Guide to Getting a Grip on Anger, Wellness Institute, 2002, ISBN 1-58741-103-2
- Making it Work When You Work a Lot: 10 Power Strategies for Connecting as a Couple, Kensington, 2005 ISBN 0-8065-2713-7
- The Art of the Quickie: Fast Sex, Fast Orgasm/Anywhere, Anytime, Quiver, 2006 ISBN 1-59233-240-4
- The Real Reasons Men Commit: Why He Will—or Won’t—Love, Honor and Marry You, Adams Media, 2008 ISBN 1-59869-643-2
- Sex Comes First: 15 Ways to Save Your Relationship…without leaving the bedroom, Adams Media, 2009 ISBN 1-59869-971-7
- Cracking the Love Code: A Journey of Discovery, Pop Psych Literary, 2011
- The Wrong Schwartz, Pop Psych Literary, 2011
- Casualties of Love, Pop Psych Literary, 2011
- Saving My Life: A Least Likely to Succeed Success Story, Pop Psych Literary
