= 2018 Utah Senate election =

- November 6, 2018

15 of the 29 seats in the Utah State Senate 15 seats needed for a majority
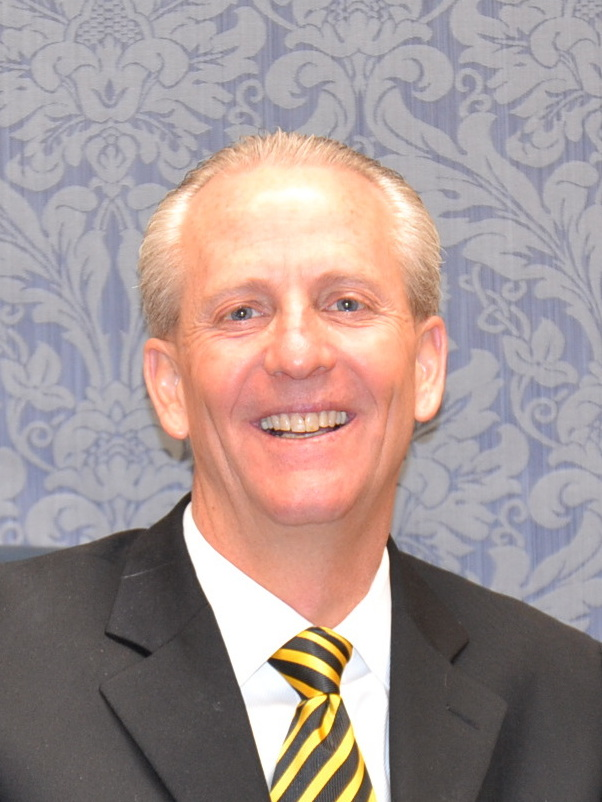

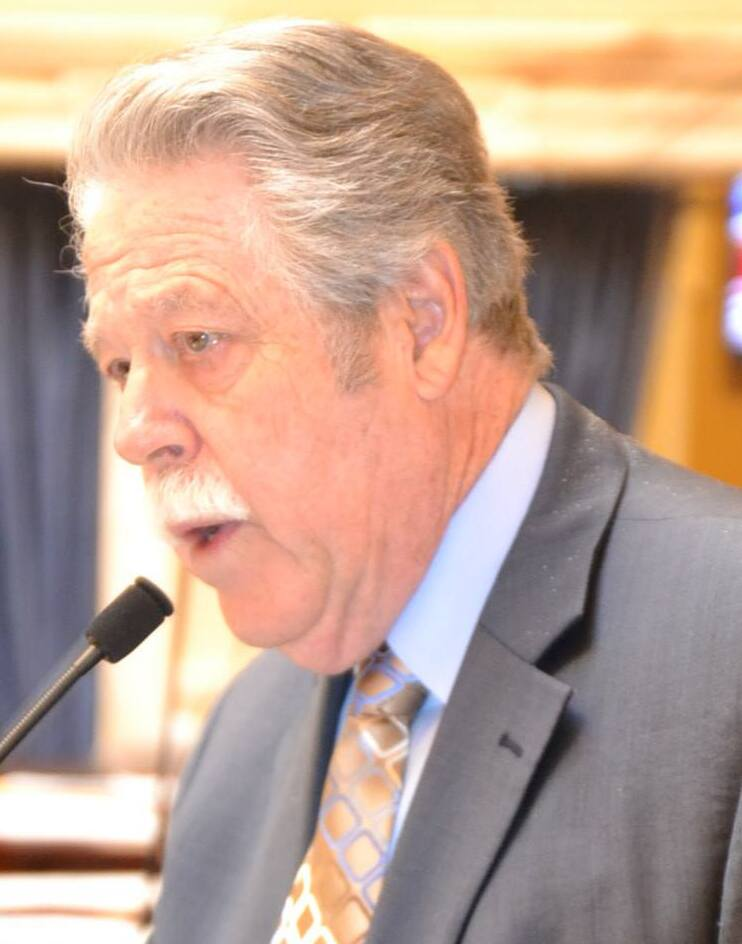
| | Majority party | Minority party |
|---|---|---|
| Leader | Wayne L. Niederhauser (retired) | Gene Davis |
| Party | Republican | Democratic |
| Leader's seat | 9th district | 3rd district |
| Seats before | 24 | 5 |
| Seats after | 23 | 6 |
| Seat change | ▼1 | ▲1 |
| Popular vote | 306,354 | 216,893 |
| Percentage | 57.29% | 40.56% |
- Results: Democratic gain Republican hold Democratic hold
President of the Senate before election
Wayne L. Niederhauser
Republican
President
J. Stuart Adams
Republican

The 2018 Utah Senate election was held on November 6, 2018. Fourteen Senate seats were up for election. Prior to the election, the Republicans held a majority.

== Overview ==
| Affiliation | Candidates | Votes | Vote % | Seats won | Seats after |
|---|---|---|---|---|---|
| Republican | 15 | 306,354 | 57.29% | 10 (▼1) | 23 |
| Democratic | 13 | 216,893 | 40.56% | 4 (▲1) | 6 |
| United Utah | 3 | 5,421 | 1.01% | 0 | |
| Independent American | 1 | 2,738 | 0.51% | 0 | |
| Libertarian | 1 | 2,095 | 0.39% | 0 | |
| Green | 1 | 1,225 | 0.23% | 0 | |
| Total | 32 | 534,726 | 100.0% | 14 | 29 |

== Close races ==
| District | Winner | Margin |
|---|---|---|
| District 8 | Democratic (flip) | 14.17% |
| District 12 | Republican | 5.22% |

== Predictions ==
| Source | Ranking | As of |
|---|---|---|
| Governing | Safe R | October 8, 2018 |

== Results ==
The election took place on November 6, 2018.

| District | Party | Incumbent | Status | Party | Candidate | Votes | % |
|---|---|---|---|---|---|---|---|
| 2 | Democratic | Jim Dabakis | Ran for mayor of Salt Lake City | Democratic | Derek Kitchen | 32,930 | 76.65% |
| 2 | Democratic | Jim Dabakis | Ran for mayor of Salt Lake City | Republican | Chase Winder | 10,030 | 23.35% |
| 3 | Democratic | Gene Davis | Re-elected | Democratic | Gene Davis | 22,362 | 70.04% |
| 3 | Democratic | Gene Davis | Re-elected | Republican | Jeremy D. Egan | 9,566 | 29.96% |
| 4 | Democratic | Jani Iwamoto | Re-elected | Democratic | Jani Iwamoto | 34,651 | 67.09% |
| 4 | Democratic | Jani Iwamoto | Re-elected | Republican | Alan Monsen | 17,000 | 32.91% |
| 5 | Democratic | Karen Mayne | Re-elected | Democratic | Karen Mayne | 17,129 | 68.67% |
| 5 | Democratic | Karen Mayne | Re-elected | Republican | Kimdyl Allen | 7,814 | 31.33% |
| 8 | Republican | Brian Zehnder | Defeated | Democratic | Kathleen Riebe | 23,221 | 55.82% |
| 8 | Republican | Brian Zehnder | Defeated | Republican | Brian Zehnder | 17,328 | 41.65% |
| 8 | Republican | Brian Zehnder | Defeated | United Utah | John Jackson | 1,053 | 2.53% |
| 9 | Republican | Wayne Niederhauser | Retired | Republican | Kirk A. Cullimore Jr. | 24,410 | 65.89% |
| 9 | Republican | Wayne Niederhauser | Retired | Democratic | Alexander Castagno | 12,639 | 34.11% |
| 11 | Republican | Dan McCay | Re-elected | Republican | Dan McCay | 27,995 | 67.75% |
| 11 | Republican | Dan McCay | Re-elected | Democratic | Christian Burridge | 13,327 | 32.25% |
| 12 | Republican | Daniel Thatcher | Re-elected | Republican | Daniel Thatcher | 13,835 | 50.38% |
| 12 | Republican | Daniel Thatcher | Re-elected | Democratic | Clare Collard | 12,400 | 45.16% |
| 12 | Republican | Daniel Thatcher | Re-elected | Green | Abrian B. Velarde | 1,225 | 4.46% |
| 15 | Republican | Keith Grover | Re-elected | Republican | Keith Grover | 20,010 | 76.45% |
| 15 | Republican | Keith Grover | Re-elected | United Utah | Lee D. Houghton | 3,425 | 13.09% |
| 15 | Republican | Keith Grover | Re-elected | Independent American | Tommy Williams | 2,738 | 10.46% |
| 17 | Republican | Scott Sandall | Re-elected | Republican | Scott Sandall | 28,471 | 77.83% |
| 17 | Republican | Scott Sandall | Re-elected | Democratic | Michael A. Keil | 8,110 | 22.17% |
| 18 | Republican | Ann Millner | Re-elected | Republican | Ann Millner | 20,278 | 63.64% |
| 18 | Republican | Ann Millner | Re-elected | Democratic | Jason Yu | 9,489 | 29.78% |
| 18 | Republican | Ann Millner | Re-elected | Libertarian | Kevin L. Bryan | 2,095 | 6.58% |
| 21 | Republican | Jerry W. Stevenson | Re-elected | Republican | Jerry W. Stevenson | 23,889 | 71.69% |
| 21 | Republican | Jerry W. Stevenson | Re-elected | Democratic | Jake Penrod | 9,435 | 28.31% |
| 22 | Republican | Stuart Adams | Re-elected | Republican | Stuart Adams | 32,765 | 100% |
| 26 | Republican | Kevin T. VanTassell | Retired | Republican | Ronald Winterton | 24,727 | 62.71% |
| 26 | Republican | Kevin T. VanTassell | Retired | Democratic | Eileen Gallagher | 13,758 | 34.89% |
| 26 | Republican | Kevin T. VanTassell | Retired | United Utah | Cathy Callow-Heusser | 943 | 2.39% |
| 28 | Republican | Evan Vickers | Re-elected | Republican | Evan Vickers | 28,236 | 79.14% |
| 28 | Republican | Evan Vickers | Re-elected | Democratic | Mark Chambers | 7,442 | 20.86% |

== See also ==
- Utah Senate
- Utah Legislature
- Utah elections, 2018
