= Karina W. Davidson =

- Education: Queen's University, B.A. University of Waterloo, M.A.Sc., Ph.D.
- Title: Senior Vice President of Research, Northwell Health Dean of Academic Affairs, Director and Professor, Institute of Health System Science, Feinstein Institutes for Medical Research Donald and Barbara Zucker Professor in Health Outcomes, Donald and Barbara Zucker School of Medicine at Hofstra/Northwell
- Website: https://feinstein.northwell.edu/institutes-researchers/our-researchers/karina-davidson-phd

Karina W. Davidson is senior vice president of research at Northwell Health and is the director of the Institute of Health System Science at the Feinstein Institutes of Medical Research. She was previously vice-dean of organizational effectiveness and executive director of the Center for Behavioral Cardiovascular Health at Columbia University Medical Center. She was also Chief Academic Officer at NewYork-Presbyterian Hospital in New York City.

== Education ==
Davidson received her education in Canada, earning her B.A. degree with honors from Queen's University in Kingston, Ontario, Canada and her M.A.Sc. in Industrial and Organizational Psychology and her Ph.D. in Clinical Psychology from the University of Waterloo in Waterloo, Ontario. She also served as a health and child clinical psychology intern at Kitchener-Waterloo Hospital and has been licensed in psychology by the Nova Scotia, Ontario, and Alabama Boards of Examiners and by the University of the State of New York Education Department.

== Career ==
Davidson received her first faculty appointment in 1991 from Dalhousie University in Halifax, Nova Scotia as assistant professor of psychology. In 1996, she became assistant professor of psychology at the University of Alabama, where she became tenured associate professor in 2000. She then moved to New York, where she was at Mount Sinai School of Medicine in the division of Cardiology for the next three years. In 2003, Davidson was appointed co-director of the Center of the Behavioral Cardiovascular Health at Columbia University Medical Center. She became Director of the Center in 2008, and in her position as tenured professor of medicine, Cardiology, and Psychiatry she oversaw a team of researchers who study how behavior, health disparities, and psychosocial factors affect the biology and incidence of hypertension and heart disease. In 2016, she became Vice-Dean of Organizational Effectiveness for Columbia University College of Physicians & Surgeons and Chief Academic Officer at NewYork-Presbyterian Hospital. Her portfolio for these two leadership positions focuses on clinical learning environment innovation for medical students and residents and executive leadership training programs for the next generation of medical school and hospital leaders. For more than 25 years, Dr. Davidson has served in leadership roles for teams focused on the advancement of scientific, educational and patient care missions through both the generation and implementation of evidence-based practices. She has been the principal investigator of more than 30 federally funded grants and authored over 375 peer-reviewed articles. Dr. Davidson is also past chair of the United States Preventive Services Task Force.

== Research focus ==
While working at Dalhousie University, Davidson became keenly interested in the relationship between psychosocial risk factors and their role in the course and outcome of cardiovascular disease. Since then, she has been the recipient of numerous National Institutes of Health (NIH) grants and has authored a number of high impact studies which have contributed to the evidence base of behavioral cardiology, a new frontier in the field of cardiology.

In a study of the association between anger expression and coronary heart disease (CHD), Davidson and colleagues found that men who constructively expressed anger had a lower incident rate of CHD, but that destructive anger justification increased the rate. Another paper from the same study showed that increased positive affect was associated with a lower risk of CHD. This was the first prospective study published to investigate this relationship.

Davidson has conducted multiple randomized, controlled trials for managing anger or depression to examine possible improvements in quality of life, cardiovascular, and cost outcomes. In these studies, patients with depression following acute coronary syndrome (ACS) were found to have significantly decreased symptoms if they were given enhanced treatment (including having their preferred form of treatment) than those given usual care after 6 months.

During the course of her Directorship at CBCH, Davidson has developed team-wide expertise in systematic review methods, and in 2006 she founded the Cochrane Behavioral Medicine Field, an international effort to synthesize and disseminate evidence for behavioral medicine interventions.

Davidson continues to be a prolific researcher and has authored over 375 peer-reviewed articles, numerous editorials and book chapters, served as editor for various handbooks, and served on multiple scientific journal editorial boards. Her recent research includes an N-of-1 study in cancer survivors to identify potential treatments for depression, collaborating with NewYork-Presbyterian Hospital to look at means of increasing patient flow through the emergency department, and acting as the Resource and Coordinating Center for the NIH's Science of Behavior Change Research Network.

Dr. Davidson's current research focuses on innovations in personalized trials to manage chronic disease and patient symptoms that incorporate patient preferences and values. She has conducted randomized controlled trials on depression screening and treatments for healthy, hypertensive, and cardiac patients. Dr. Davidson was awarded the National Institutes of Health Transformative R01 grant to accomplish Personalized Trial (N-of-1) clinical trial delivery at the point of care. The vision of this grant is to reimagine the process by which therapies are tested in the clinical encounter to ultimately identify for each patient the therapy that provides maximal benefit and minimal harm.

== Awards and memberships ==
Davidson has won numerous awards and accolades for research, teaching, and mentoring, including a Distinguished Teaching award from the University of Alabama Arts and Science School, a Distinguished Service Award and a Distinguished Science Award from the Society for Behavioral Medicine, a Career Service Award from the Health Psychology Division of the American Psychological Association, a European Health Psychology Fellow award, and, most recently, the Columbia University Medical Center/Irving Institute Mentor of the Year.

Davidson has served the professional bodies in her field at the highest levels, as President of the Health Psychology Division of the American Psychological Association, and as President of the Academy of Behavioral Medicine Research. She is also a serving member of the United States Preventative Services Task Force and is currently the Chair of the National Heart, Lung and Blood Institute (NHLBI) joint Council-Board of External Experts Strategic Planning Committee. She was elected to the National Academy of Medicine in 2023 and inducted in 2024.

== Selected publications ==
1. Collaboration and Shared Decision-Making Between Patients and Clinicians in Preventive Health Care Decisions and US Preventive Services Task Force Recommendations. KW Davidson, CM Mangione, MJ Barry, WK Nicholson, MD Cabana, ... JAMA 327 (12), 1171-1176
2. Actions to Transform US Preventive Services Task Force Methods to Mitigate Systemic Racism in Clinical Preventive Services. KW Davidson, CM Mangione, MJ Barry, MD Cabana, AB Caughey, ..JAMA 326 (23), 2405-2411
3. Davidson KW, Kemper AR, Doubeni CA, Tseng CW, Simon MA, Kubik M, Curry SJ, Mills J, Krist A, Ngo-Metzger Q and Borsky A. Developing Primary Care-Based Recommendations for Social Determinants of Health: Methods of the U.S. Preventive Services Task Force. Ann Intern Med. 2020;173:461-467.
4. Incorporation of social risk in US Preventive Services Task Force recommendations and identification of key challenges for primary care. KW Davidson, AH Krist, CW Tseng, M Simon, CA Doubeni, AR Kemper, ...Jama 326 (14), 1410-1415
5. Aspirin use to prevent preeclampsia and related morbidity and mortality: US Preventive Services Task Force recommendation statement. KW Davidson, MJ Barry, CM Mangione, M Cabana, AB Caughey, ...Jama 326 (12), 1186-1191
6. Richardson S, Hirsch JS, Narasimhan M, Crawford JM, McGinn T, Davidson KW, Barnaby DP, Becker LB, Chelico JD, Cohen SL, Cookingham J, Coppa K, Diefenbach MA, Dominello AJ, Duer-Hefele J, Falzon L, Gitlin J, Hajizadeh N, Harvin TG, Hirschwerk DA, Kim EJ, Kozel ZM, Marrast LM, Mogavero JN, Osorio GA, Qiu M and Zanos TP. Presenting Characteristics, Comorbidities, and Outcomes Among 5700 Patients Hospitalized With COVID-19 in the New York City Area. JAMA.2020;323: 2052–2059.
7. Evidence-based behavioral medicine: what is it and how do we achieve it? KW Davidson, M Goldstein, RM Kaplan, PG Kaufmann, GL Knatterud, Annals of behavioral medicine 26 (3), 161-171
8. Shaffer JA, Kronish IM, Falzon L, Cheung YK and Davidson KW. N-of-1 Randomized Intervention Trials in Health Psychology: A Systematic Review and Methodology Critique. Ann Behav Med. 2018;52:731-742.
9. Moise N, Wood D, Kuen KCY, Duan N, Onge TS, Duer-Hefele J, Pu T, Davidson KW, Kronish IM and members of the "Personalized Trial C. Patient preferences for Personalized (N-of-1) Trials: A conjoint analysis. J Clin Epidemiol. 2018;102:12-22.
10. Wasson LT, Cusmano A, Meli L, Louh I, Falzon L, Hampsey M, Young G, Shaffer J and Davidson KW. Association Between Learning Environment Interventions and Medical Student Well-being: A Systematic Review. JAMA. 2016;316:2237-2252.

PubMed
