= Poretskoye, Vladimir Oblast =

Poretskoye Порецкое
- Selo
- Location within Vladimir Oblast Location within Russia
- Coordinates: 56°16′N 40°31′E
- Country: Russia
- Region: Vladimir Oblast
- District: Suzdalsky District
- Time zone: UTC+3:00

Church of the Transfiguration of the Lord in Poretskoye

Poretskoye (Russian: Порецкое) is a rural locality (a selo) in Pavlovskoye Rural Settlement, Suzdalsky District, Vladimir Oblast, Russia. The population was 795 as of 2010. There are 17 streets.

== Geography ==
Poretskoye is located on the Nerl River, 21 km southeast of Suzdal (the district's administrative centre) by road. Sokol is the nearest rural locality.
