= Yousef Al-Abed =

Yousef Abed
- Born: Hebron, Palestine
- Education: College of Science and Technology, University of Jordan, University of Tübingen
- Scientific career
- Fields: Organic Chemistry, Medicinal Chemistry
- Workplaces: Feinstein Institute for Medical Research
- Website: www.feinsteininstitute.org/faculty/yousef-al-abed-md/

Yousef Al-Abed is the head of the Center for Molecular Innovation at the Northwell's Feinstein Institute for Medical Research, in Manhasset, New York. An organic chemist by training, Al-Abed holds dual-appointment as a Professor of Molecular Medicine and Medicine at Hofstra Northwell School of Medicine.

Al-Abed received his Bachelor of Science degree in Chemistry and Chemical Technology from the College of Science and Technology in Jerusalem in 1985, followed by his Master of Science degree in organic chemistry from the University of Jordan in 1989 and his PhD in organic chemistry from the University of Tübingen, Germany in 1994. He then served as a postdoctoral investigator at the Picower Institute for Medical Research, now known as the Feinstein Institute.

Al-Abed's research has focused on a protein called macrophage migration inhibitory factor as a drug target for autoimmune disease and inflammation.
