= Tina Park =

American politician and financial auditor

- Born: Los Angeles, California
- Occupations: Politician, auditor

Tina Park is a financial auditor and former member of the board of trustees for the Los Angeles Community College District (LACCD). She was elected as trustee in the runoff election held on May 19, 2009, over incumbent Angela J. Reddock, garnering 168,367, or approximately 54%, of the votes. She was one of the seven on the board of trustees for LACCD, the biggest community college district in the United States.

== Early life and education ==
Park was born in Seoul, South Korea, and she immigrated to the United States at the age of six, living in various areas of the country, including Alaska, Los Angeles, and New York. As the daughter of a minister and educator, she regularly volunteered in soup kitchens, mentored young children in after-school programs, and remained active in various Christian outreach services throughout her formative years.

She resided in New York for the greater part of her education, attending Queensborough Community College and eventually transferring to Hofstra University, where she graduated with a bachelor's degree in accounting. While at Hofstra, Park also earned life-coaching certification from Landmark Education.

== Career in the private sector ==
After graduating from Hofstra, Park accepted a position in a program at the New York Stock Exchange (NYSE) as a financial auditor, one of only twelve chosen from a nationwide pool. In 2003, she participated in a $1.4 billion global settlement and enforcement agreement between the Securities and Exchange Commission (SEC), the National Association of Securities Dealers (NASD), NYSE, and ten of the largest investment firms in the United States, in order to address the issue of conflict of interest within their businesses.

On the morning of September 11, 2001, she was scheduled to be working in Tower One of the World Trade Center. Park relocated to Los Angeles in 2004 at the request of her mother, who believed that New York City was too dangerous.

After relocating to Los Angeles, Park continued her career as an internal audit consultant at Protiviti, after which she worked as the assistant controller at New Wave Entertainment, a premiere content development and production enterprise.

== 2009 Election ==
In late 2008, Park decided to announce her candidacy for a seat on the Los Angeles Community College board of trustees with the desire to establish better fiscal oversight upon the community college district. This decision came about after working in the fundraising team for the Hillary Clinton campaign in 2008, after which political insiders encouraged her to run for the board. Against the incumbent trustee and three other candidates, Park received 56,169 votes from supporters across Los Angeles in the March 3 citywide primary, ensuring her place on the ballot as the runner-up. Then, in the subsequent runoff election held on May 19, 2009, she defeated incumbent Angela J. Reddock by a difference of over 20,000 votes, winning over 54% of total votes cast.

In a swearing-in ceremony on July 15, 2009, Park became the youngest female and the first Korean-American to be elected onto the LACCD board of trustees. Park served as a trustee through June 2013.

== Korean media reception ==
Throughout her campaign, Park emphasized her dedication to the Korean American community. After the 2009 board elections, Park expressed her gratitude to the Korean-American community for their encouragement and vote support. As a part of her swearing-in ceremony speech, Park spoke briefly in Korean, stating her support for the unity and growth of the Korean American society.

Upon winning the elections, Park was recognized immediately by the Korean press in both the United States and South Korea. Park's name rose to the top three most searched terms on Naver, one of the most popular search portals in South Korea. Park's activities and work as a trustee was aired in October 2009 on a South Korean recreational program of Seoul Broadcasting System, titled "Lee Moon-Sae's Brand Korea." Park also attended the 2009 Korean Women's International Network, hosted by the Ministry of Gender Equality of South Korea.
