= Sina Rabbany =

Dean, Bioengineering Professor

Sina Y. Rabbany

Dean of the Fred DeMatteis School of Engineering and Applied Science
- Incumbent
- Assumed office June 7, 2016
- Preceded by: Simon Ben-Avi

Personal details
- Education: University of Pennsylvania (PhD, 1991)
- Profession: Academic, Bioengineer
- Awards: Fellow of the American Institute for Medical and Biological Engineering (2012)
- Scientific career
- Fields: Tissue engineering, Cellular Biomechanics, Cardiovascular dynamics
- Workplaces: Hofstra University
- Thesis: The genesis of intramyocardial pressure (1992)
- Doctoral advisor: Abraham Noordergraaf

Sina Y. Rabbany is the Jean Nerken Distinguished Professor of Engineering at Hofstra University, dean of the Fred DeMatteis School of Engineering and Applied Science, founding director of the school's Bioengineering program, and adjunct associate professor of bioengineering at the Weill Cornell Medical College of Cornell University. Under his tenure, the DeMatteis School's fast growth led to the school's planned expansion into a new Science and Innovation Center. His research concerns cellular and tissue engineering of the vascular system and investigates the impact of the biophysical microenvironment on the structure and function of endothelial cells. His research explores the capabilities of endothelial cells to build functional blood vessels and support organ regeneration. His h-index is 28 by Google Scholar.

== Career ==
Rabbany graduated from the University of Pennsylvania in 1985 with a Bachelor of Science in engineering (BSE) cum laude. He also earned his Master of Science in Engineering and Ph.D. in Bioengineering from the University of Pennsylvania. He worked on his dissertation on the genesis of intramyocardial pressure with Dr. Abraham Noordergraaf. Before his start at Hofstra, Rabbany served as a postdoctoral fellow at the Biomolecular Science & Engineering Division of the Naval Research Laboratory in Washington, D.C.

Rabbany joined Hofstra in 1990 as an assistant professor of engineering to create the Hofstra Bioengineering Program, the first on Long Island. He spent 24 years teaching bioengineering at Hofstra before serving as Acting Dean in 2014. As of June 7, 2016, he continues to serve as the dean of Hofstra's Fred DeMatteis School of Engineering and Applied Science. Rabbany has received funding from numerous organizations, including the National Cancer Institute, National Institutes of Health, and the Office of Naval Research. He has more than 70 publications and holds patents in the areas of cardiovascular dynamics, biosensors, vascular biology, tissue engineering, and regenerative medicine. He holds the Nerken Distinguished Professorship in Engineering and serves as the Founding Director of the Bioengineering Program at Hofstra.

== Honors and awards ==
Rabbany was selected a Fellow of the American Institute for Medical and Biological Engineering (AIMBE) in 2012 "for his outstanding contributions to the research and understanding of the role that the vascular system plays in promoting functional tissue regeneration and for his contributions to bioengineering education." Other awards include an Achievement Award from the Engineers Joint Committee of Long Island (EJCLI) and the Athanasios Papoulis Award from Institute of Electrical and Electronics Engineers (IEEE) "for [his] noteworthy contributions to biomedical engineering education and Hofstra’s Medical School Curriculum."
