= Stephen Dolgin =

American pediatric surgeon

Stephen E. Dolgin (born 1949 in Staten Island, New York City) is an American pediatric surgeon, and professor of Surgery at Zucker School of Medicine at Hofstra/Northwell. He is a consultant at Cohen Children’s Medical Center, the pediatric hub of Northwell Health.

== Life and work ==
Dolgin has published numerous articles and presented numerous papers on pediatric surgical procedures and consequences, particularly in the areas of inflammatory bowel disease, neonatal surgery and ovarian pathology. He is on the editorial boards of The Journal of Pediatric Surgery, The Journal of Pediatric Surgery Case Reports and Pediatrics in Review. He received several awards for teaching from medical students and surgery residents at Schneider Children's Hospital and at Mount Sinai Hospital, New York City, where he served as chief of pediatric surgery from 1984, professor of surgery and of pediatrics and, in 2002–03, interim chief of surgery. In 2005 he became chief, division of pediatric surgery at Schneider Children's Hospital. This is now known as Cohen Children's Medical Center of New York. He was educated at Yale College, BA, and New York University Medical School, MD, where he was elected as a member of Alpha Omega Alpha. He completed a residency in general surgery at The Brigham and Women's Hospital, Boston, MA, in 1982, and a fellowship in pediatric surgery at Children's Memorial Hospital, Chicago, IL in 1984. He is a Diplomate of the American Board of Surgery, with certification in Pediatric Surgery and Surgical Critical Care. He is Professor of Surgery and Pediatrics at the Zucker School of Medicine at Hofstra/Northwell. In September 2016 he became Chief of Pediatric Surgery at Lenox Hill Hospital in Manattan. In January 2018 he became Chief of Pediatric Surgery at Northern Westchester Hospital in Mt.Kisco. In the spring of 2019 he returns to Cohen Children’s Medical Center as a consultant. In 2024 he obtained an MPH in health care policy and management at CUNY-SPH.

== Honors and awards ==
Dolgin has received the following honors and awards, among others:

- Surgical Chief Residents' Attending Physician of the Year, Mount Sinai School of Medicine, 1990
- Selected by the graduating class of the Mount Sinai School of Medicine to administer the Code of Maimonides at its graduation, May 12, 2000
- Listed repeatedly in New York (magazine)'s Best Doctors in New York and in Castle Connolly Medical Ltd Top Doctors in the United States

Physician of the year 2004, awarded by The Mount Sinai Hospital community of nurses Attending of the year, 2006, NS-LIJ Department of Pediatrics Attending of the year, 2006, Department of Pediatrics, NS-LIJ Medical Center

Academic excellence, 2025, Dept of Health Care Policy and Management, CUNY-SPH

== Works ==
- Perinatal hemorrhage from umbilical cord ulceration: a potentially catastrophic association with duodenal and jejunal obstruction, Journal of Pediatric Surgery (Vol 53, Issue 9, Sept. 2018)
- Necrotizing enterocolitis, Pediatrics in Review (Volume 38, issue 12, 2017)
- Trends in the diagnosis and management of pediatric appendicitis, Pediatrics in Review (Volume 37, issue 2, 2016)
- Recent trends in the operative experience of junior pediatric surgical attending: a study of APSA applicant case logs, Jl Pediatric Surgery (Volume 50, issue 1, 2015)
- Pitfalls in prenatal diagnosis of unusual congenital abdominal wall defects, The Journal of Maternal-Fetal & Neonatal Medicine (Volume 21, issue 2, 2008)
- Surgical Management of Upper Gastrointestinal and Small Bowel Crohn's Disease, Seminars in Pediatric Surgery(Vol 16, August 2007)
- The incidence of complete androgen insensitivity in girls with inguinal hernias and assessment of screening with vaginal length measurement, Journal of Pediatric Surgery (Volume 40, 2005)
- Answered and Unanswered Controversies in the Surgical Management of Extra Hepatic Biliary Atresia, Pediatric Transplantation (Volume 8, issue 6, 2004)
- Maximizing Ovarian Salvage When Treating Idiopathic Adnexal Torsion, Journal of Pediatric Surgery (Vol 35, Issue 4, April 2000)
- Ovarian Masses in the Newborn, Seminars in Pediatric Surgery (Vol 9, Issue 3, August 2000)
- Unsatisfactory Experience with Minimal Intervention Management for Gastroschisis, Journal of Pediatric Surgery (Vol 35, Issue 10, October 2000)
- Morbidity and Mortality of Open Lung Biopsy in Children, Pediatrics (Vol 99, May 1999)
- Restorative Proctocolectomy in Children with Ulcerative Colitis Utilizing Rectal Mucosectomy With or Without Diverting Ileostomy, Journal of Pediatric Surgery (Vol 34, Issue 5, May, 1999)
- Morbidity and Mortality of Open Lung Biopsy in Children Pediatrics (Volume 99, issue 5, 1997)
- Maternal and Neonatal Risk Factors for Cryptochidism, Epidemiology (Volume 6, issue 2, 1995)
- Subcutaneous bronchogenic cysts and sinuses, Otolaryngology - Head and Neck Surg (Volume 112, issue 6, 1995)
- Prevalence and natural history of cryptorchidism, Pediatrics (Volume 92, issue 1, 1993)
- The risk of perforation when children with possible appendicitis are observed in the hospital, Surgery, Gynecology & Obstetrics (Volume 175, issue 4, 1992)

Textbook Stephen Dolgin and Chad Hamner, eds. Surgical care of major newborn malformations, World Scientific Publishers, 2012

== Notes ==
Editor text: Surgical care of major newborn malformations, with Dr. Chad Hamner, World Scientific Publishers, 2012

Preceded by Alberto Pena	Chief, Division Pediatric Surgery, Schneider Children's Hospital, North Shore-LIJ Health System; 2005-2011;	Succeeded by -
