= Michelle Sakhai =

American painter and educator (born 1983)

- Born: 1983 (age 42–43)
- Education: Hofstra University; Academy of Art University
- Occupation: Painter
- Website: michellesakhai.com

Michelle Sakhai is an American painter and educator.

== Early life and education ==
Michelle Sakhai was born in 1983 to a Japanese mother and Iranian father, spending her youth in New York. She graduated from Hofstra University with a BA in Art History and minor in Fine Arts, and received her MFA from Academy of Art University. She has also studied in Venice, Italy; Barcelona at the d’Arts Plastique I Disseny; and France at the Marchutz Academy of Fine Art in Aix en Provence.

== Art career ==
Sakhai is an abstract expressionist artist bringing spirituality into her paintings. Her paintings have been created using oils and mixed mediums such as metal leaf. Her solo exhibitions include the 2012 exhibition Awakenings, shown at SOMArts Cultural Center in San Francisco. Her work has also appeared in group exhibitions at venues including Lehman College and Stanford Art Spaces. In 2016 her paintings were the focus of the book AWAKENING: The Paintings of Michelle Sakhai. That year her work was shown in the solo exhibition Treasured Elements at the Madelyn Jordon Fine Art Gallery. In September 2019, Sakhai opened her exhibition Arcana: Interpretations of the Tarot at the same gallery.

== Other work ==
In 2017 Sakhai became the artist-in-residence for the Fairmont San Francisco. She taught painting at the University of California, Berkeley, in addition to teaching Transformative Art at the Harlem Hospital Center and Primordial Sound Meditation at the Chopra Center. Currently she serves on the HCLAS Dean's Advisory Board at Hofstra University.
