= Anthony Cerami =

American entrepreneur and medical research scientist

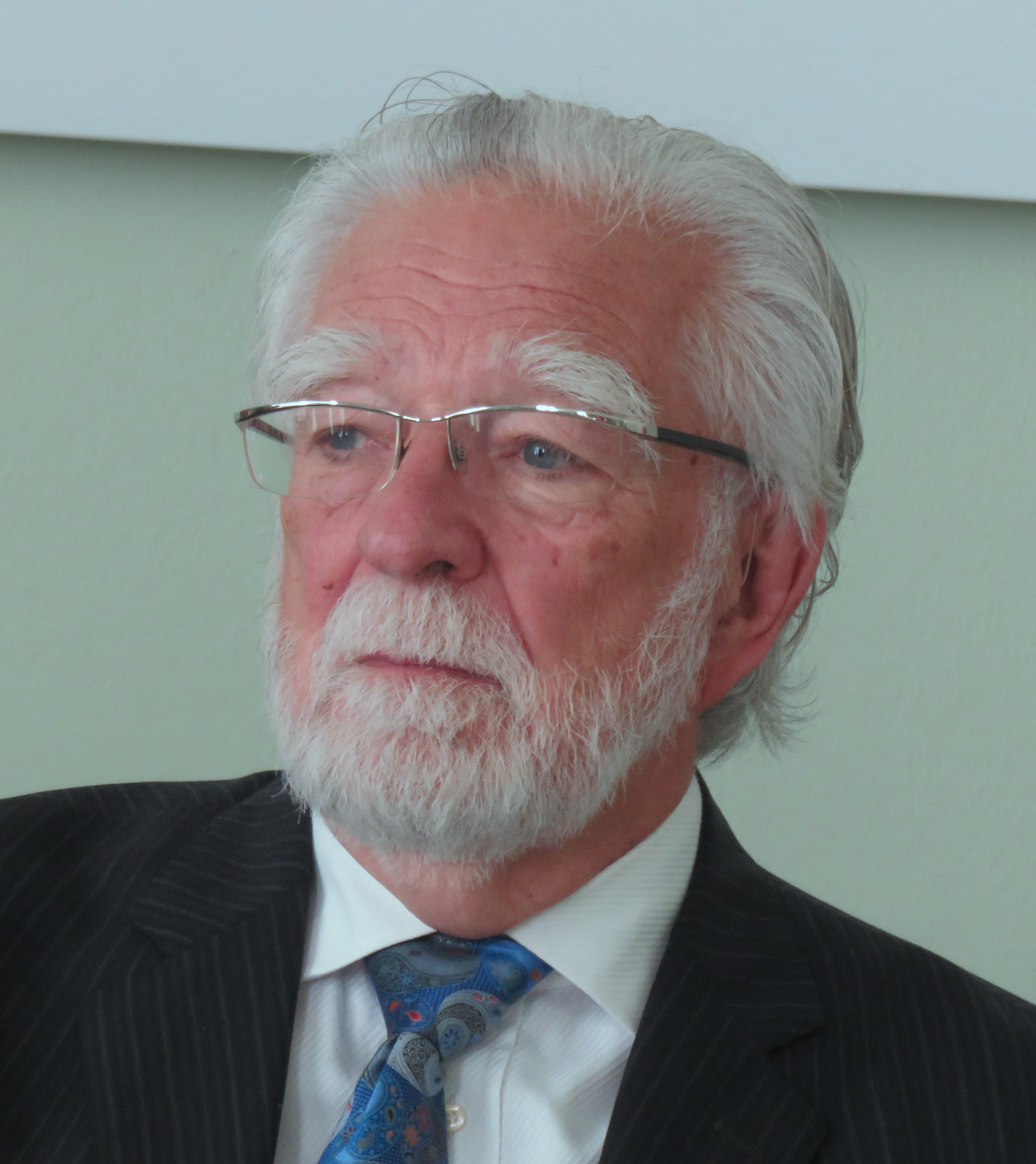
- Born: October 3, 1940 (age 85); Newark, New Jersey, U.S.
- Education: Rockefeller University, Rutgers University
- Known for: Medical Research
- Awards: Paul Ehrlich and Ludwig Darmstaedter Prize (2018)

Anthony Cerami (born October 3, 1940) is an American entrepreneur and medical research scientist.

== Biography ==
Anthony Cerami received his undergraduate degree from Rutgers University and received a Ph.D. in 1967 from Rockefeller University, New York, completed postdoctoral fellowships at Harvard Medical School and at the Jackson Laboratory and served for 20 years as Professor and Head of the Laboratory of Medical Biochemistry, and Dean of Graduate and Postgraduate Studies at Rockefeller.

In late 1986 Cerami was a founder of Alteon, Inc. which licensed patents filed by Rockefeller on work Cerami had done there; Cerami took a seat on the board of the company, was on the scientific advisory board, and received research funding from Alteon first at Rockefeller and then at Picower, and later through his consulting company and the "Kenneth S. Warren Laboratories, Inc." In the spring of 1999 Alteon and Cerami terminated the consulting agreement and research agreement with Warren Labs, and Cerami resigned from the board.

Cerami was one of 15 Rockefeller faculty who vocally opposed the appointment of David Baltimore as president of Rockefeller in 1989. Due in part to that disagreement, in 1991 Cerami left Rockefeller to found (with Jeffry Picower) the Picower Institute for Medical Research on the grounds of North Shore University Hospital. As of March 1998, Cerami was President of Cerami Consulting and was president and Trustee of the "Kenneth S. Warren Laboratories, Inc. The Picower Institute was closed down by Picower in 2001, and early the next year it was acquired by The Institute for Medical Research at North Shore-LIJ.

As of 2001, Cerami was the director and lead researcher of the Kenneth S. Warren Institute, and in 2001, Warren Pharmaceuticals was formed to commercialize inventions made at the institute; Cerami was chairman of the board.

== Research ==
Cerami has led research programs into genetic, metabolic and infectious diseases, with the goal of translating scientific discovery into drugs and diagnostic tests. He received funding from the Rockefeller Foundation to study neglected tropical diseases and traveled to Africa, where he became interested in the wasting, one of the symptoms of African sleeping sickness.

He developed and validated a measurement of glycated hemoglobin to monitor control of blood sugar in people with diabetes, and a paper he published in 1985 using polyclonal antibodies against tumour necrosis factor-alpha was important in the field of immunology for demonstrating that TNF-alpha causes disease and blocking it could be a treatment.

Work that he did while he was at Rockefeller on advanced glycation end-products (AGEs) and protein cross-linking and their roles in metabolic diseases and aging was patented by Rockfeller and licensed to Alteon Inc. in 1987 and in 1992 the company licensed further work that Cerami did on the use of pimagedine to reduce AGEs.

At the Warren institutes, he led work on erythropoietin derivatives that were called "tissue protective cytokines"; this work was licensed to Warren Pharmaceuticals and through them to Lundbeck in 2001; the development program was terminated in 2007.

He is the recipient of the Luft Award in Diabetes and the Frederick Banting Medal for Scientific Achievement, awarded by the American Diabetes Association in recognition of his lifelong work on diabetes.
