= Kevin J. Tracey =

American neurosurgeon and inventor (born 1957)

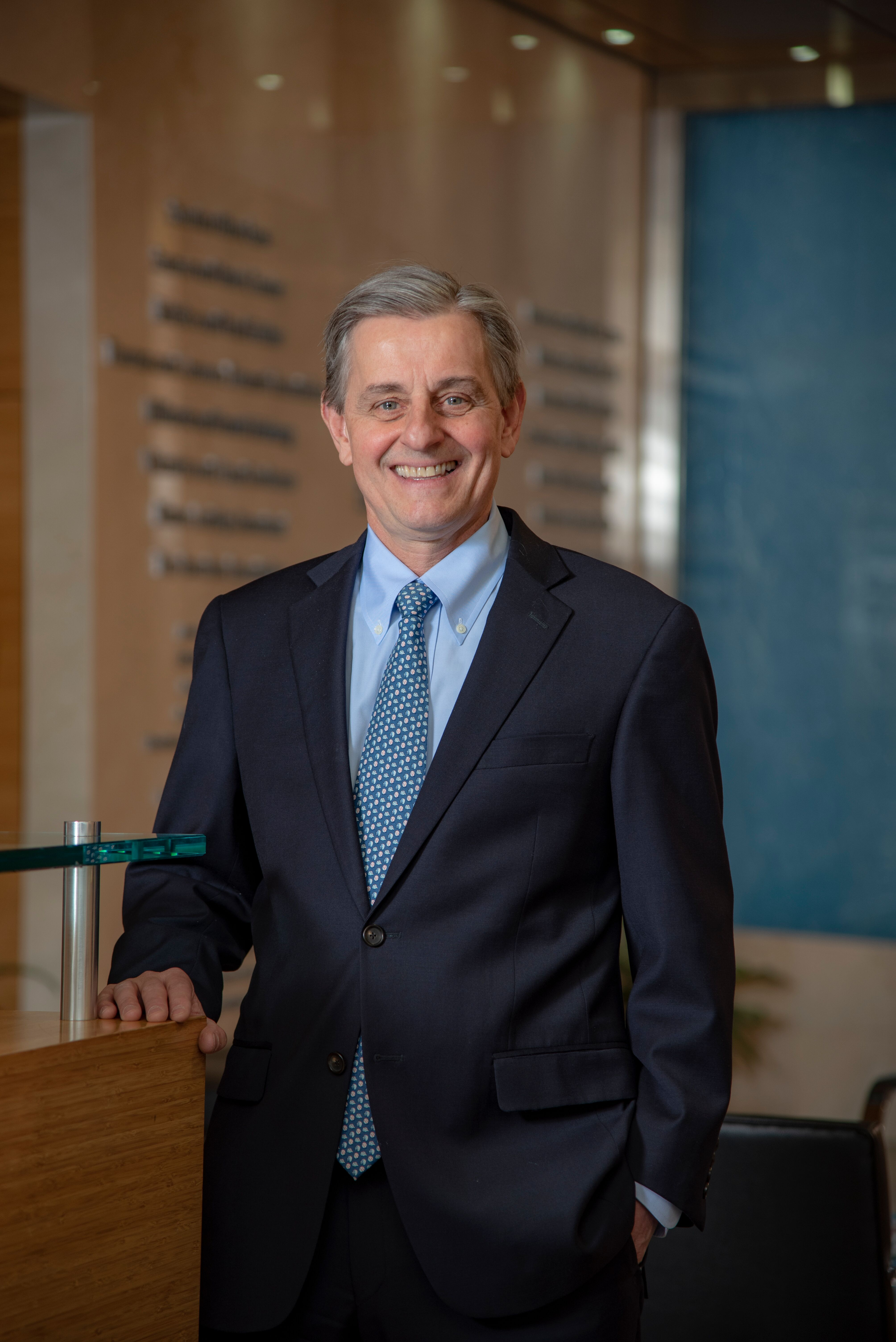
- Tracey in 2019
- Born: 10 December 1957 (age 68); Fort Wayne, Indiana
- Education: Boston College (B.S.); Boston University (M.D.)
- Known for: Inflammatory reflex Bioelectronic medicine Vagus nerve research
- Awards: Cushing Award for Technical Excellence and innovation in Neurosurgery (2026); Hans Wigzell Research Foundation Science Prize (2023); Fellow, American Institute for Medical and Biological Engineering (2020); Honorary Doctorate, Karolinska Institute (2009)
- Scientific career
- Fields: Neurosurgery, immunology, Bioelectronic medicine
- Workplaces: Feinstein Institute for Medical Research; Northwell Health; Zucker School of Medicine at Hofstra/Northwell
- Website: feinstein.northwell.edu/institutes-researchers/our-researchers/kevin-j-tracey-md

Kevin J. Tracey (born 1957) is an American neurosurgeon, biomedical researcher, and author known for his contributions to the fields of inflammation, neuroscience, and bioelectronic medicine. He is president and chief executive officer of the Feinstein Institutes for Medical Research, executive vice president for research at Northwell Health, and holds the Karches Family Distinguished Chair in Medical Research. Tracey is also professor of neurosurgery and molecular medicine at the Donald and Barbara Zucker School of Medicine at Hofstra/ Northwell, and president of the Elmezzi Graduate School of Molecular Medicine. He is recognized for discovering the “inflammatory reflex”, a neural mechanism by which the vagus nerve regulates immune responses. His research established the scientific foundation for the discipline of “bioelectronic medicine”, leading to the development of implantable devices that use vagus nerve stimulation to treat inflammatory diseases such as rheumatoid arthritis.

== Early life and education ==
Tracey was born in Fort Wayne, Indiana. He earned a Bachelor of Science (B.S.) degree, summa cum laude, in chemistry from Boston College in 1979 and a Doctor of Medicine (M.D.) degree from Boston University in 1983. From 1983 to 1992 he completed his neurosurgical training at New York Hospital-Cornell University Medical Center under neurosurgeon, Russel Patterson. During his residency, he conducted research as a guest investigator at Rockefeller University.

== Career ==
In 1992, Tracey joined Northwell Health (then North Shore-LIJ Health System), in Manhasset, New York, where he practiced neurosurgery and founded the Laboratory of Biomedical Science, later renamed the Tatyana and Alan Forman Family Laboratory of Biomedical Science. In 2005, he was appointed president and CEO of the Feinstein Institute for Medical Research, and president of the Elmezzi Graduate School of Molecular Medicine.

He co‑founded '''SetPoint Medical''', a biotechnology company developing vagus nerve stimulation devices for autoimmune diseases, and co‑founded the '''Global Sepsis Alliance''', an international non‑profit organization for sepsis awareness and prevention.

In 2021, Tracey and colleagues at the Feinstein Institutes received a five‑year, $3.7 million grant from the National Institutes of Health to investigate the molecular mechanisms underlying bioelectronic medicine.

In 2025, Kevin J. Tracey was elected as a Fellow of the National Academy of Inventors.

Kevin J. Tracey was named to the 2026 TIME100 Health list in recognition of his scientific discoveries that helped develop an implantable vagus nerve stimulation device to treat rheumatoid arthritis by modulating neural signals, supporting the balance between inflammation and immune activity.

In January 2026, Tracey was appointed to the Board of Directors at United Therapeutics.

== Research and scientific contributions ==
Tracey’s research focuses on the interaction between the nervous and immune systems, particularly the neural regulation of inflammation.

=== Tumor necrosis factor and HMGB1 ===
In early studies, Tracey and his collaborators identified '''tumor necrosis factor (TNF)''' as a key mediator of shock and tissue injury. They first demonstrated the anti‑inflammatory activity of monoclonal anti‑TNF antibodies, a discovery that supported the development of biologic therapies targeting TNF for rheumatoid arthritis and Crohn’s disease.

In 1999, his team reported that '''high mobility group box 1 (HMGB1)'''—a nuclear DNA‑binding protein—acts as a late‑phase inflammatory mediator, explaining mechanisms of sterile inflammation following trauma and sepsis.

=== The inflammatory reflex and vagus nerve ===
In the 1990s, Tracey and colleagues discovered that electrical or pharmacologic stimulation of the '''vagus nerve''' inhibits cytokine release, including TNF, through an anti‑inflammatory neural pathway. He described this mechanism as the '''inflammatory reflex''', a bidirectional feedback circuit between the nervous and immune systems. This finding provided the conceptual basis for '''bioelectronic medicine''', in which medical devices modulate peripheral nerve activity to treat inflammatory and autoimmune diseases.

Working with SetPoint Medical, Tracey’s discoveries contributed to development of an implantable vagus nerve stimulation system that, in 2025, became the first U.S. Food and Drug Administration‑approved bioelectronic medicine device for rheumatoid arthritis.

The vagus nerve is a network of nerve fibers extending from the brainstem to organs throughout the body. Its job is to regulate autonomic functions, including heart rate, digestion, and inflammatory responses. Later studies in Tracey’s laboratory identified neural circuits connecting the vagus nerve’s '''dorsal motor nucleus''' to the '''celiac–superior mesenteric ganglion complex''', demonstrating parasympathetic control of sympathetic splenic neurons. Additional research revealed that '''choline acetyltransferase‑expressing T cells (T ChAT cells)''' mediate neural suppression of cytokine production by releasing acetylcholine.

In May 2025, Kevin J. Tracey published The Great Nerve: The New Science of the Vagus Nerve and How to Harness Its Healing Reflexes, a book exploring the role of the vagus nerve in regulating the immune system. Drawing from research, Tracey discusses how stimulating the vagus nerve can turn off inflammation and could offer treatments for rheumatoid arthritis and inflammatory bowel disease, among others. While it is not a cure-all, stimulating the vagus nerve, called vagal toning, can promote relaxation and stress relief.

== Awards and honors ==
- Fellow, Royal Swedish Academy of Engineering Sciences (IVA) (2024)
- Hans Wigzell Research Foundation's Science Prize (2023)
- Fellow, American Institute for Medical and Biological Engineering (2020)
- Honorary Doctorate, University of Fribourg (2020)
- Honorary Doctorate, Karolinska Institute (2009)
- Harvey Lecture Series, Harvey Society (2018)
- Fellow, American Association for the Advancement of Science (2015)
- Member, Association of American Physicians (2009)
- Elected member, American Society for Clinical Investigation (2001)
- Highly Cited Researcher in Immunology, PLOS Biology, The Public Library of Science Magazine
- DeWitt Stetten Jr. lectureship, National Institute of Health (2007)

== Publications ==
Tracey has authored more than 450 peer‑reviewed papers and holds over 120 U.S. and international patents. His research has received over 130,000 citations, with an h‑index exceeding 170.

Year	Title	Publication	Author(s)	Volume/Issue Citation
2011	Acetylcholine-synthesizing T cells relay neural signals in a vagus nerve circuit	Science	Rosas-Ballina M, Olofsson PS, Ochani M, Valdés-Ferrer SI, Levine YA, Reardon C, Tusche MW, Pavlov VA, Andersson U, Chavan S, Mak TW, Tracey KJ	10.1126/science.1209985
2003	Nicotinic acetylcholine receptor alpha7 subunit is an essential regulator of inflammation	Nature	Wang H, Yu M, Ochani M, Amella CA, Tanovic M, Susarla S, Li JH, Wang H, Yang H, Ulloa L, Al-Abed Y, Czura CJ, Tracey KJ	10.1038/nature01339
2002	The inflammatory reflex	Nature	Tracey KJ	10.1038/nature01321
1999	HMG-1 as a late mediator of endotoxin lethality in mice	Science	Wang H, Bloom O, Zhang M, Vishnubhakat JM, Ombrellino M, Che J, Frazier A, Yang H, Ivanova S, Borovikova L, Manogue KR, Faist E, Abraham E, Andersson J, Andersson U, Molina PE, Abumrad NN, Sama A, Tracey KJ	10.1126/science.285.5425.248

== Book and editorial activities ==
- Tracey, Kevin J. (2025). The Great Nerve: The New Science of the Vagus Nerve and How to Harness Its Healing Reflexes. Avery. ISBN 978-0593716991.
- Tracey, K. J. (2005). Fatal Sequence: The Killer Within. New York: Dana Press. ISBN 978-1932594065.
- Editor-in-chief, Bioelectronic Medicine
- Advisory Editor, Journal of Experimental Medicine
- Contributing Editor, Molecular Medicine

== Media and public engagement ==
Tracey has delivered lectures and keynote addresses internationally, including the '''Harvey Lecture (2018)''', and presentations at the Constellation Forum and TEDMED, where he spoke on “How Electricity Could Replace Your Medications”. He has appeared on programs including ''The Tim Ferriss Show'' and ''The School of Greatness'' podcasts.

== Patents ==
Year	Title	Inventor(s)	Patent Number / Application Number
2025	Stimulation of the celiac-superior mesenteric ganglion complex for treating inflammation	Valentin A Pavlov, Santhoshi Poonacha Palandira, Kevin J Tracey	Application: 18929926
2025	Choline acetyltransferase as a therapy for endotoxemia, sepsis, colitis and inflammatory diseases	Sangeeta S Chavan, Kevin J Tracey	Application: 18293972
2024	Neural control of adaptive immunity	Sangeeta S Chavan, Kevin J Tracey	Application: 18278688
2024	Systems and methods for real-time monitoring of physiological biomarkers through nerve signals and use thereof	Theodoros Zanos, Todd Levy, Emily Battinelli, Kevin J Tracey, Chad E Bouton, Sangeeta Chavan, Harold Silverman	Patent: 11872371
