= Leonid Poretsky =

American endocrinologist

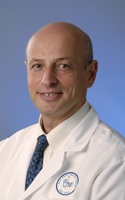
- Born: August 7, 1954 (age 72); Leningrad, USSR
- Education: St. Petersburg Medical University; Beth Israel Hospital, Boston; Harvard Medical School
- Occupations: Physician, endocrinologist
- Years active: 1977–present
- Employer: Northwell Health
- Organization: Gerald J. Friedman Diabetes Institute of Lenox Hill Hospital

Leonid Poretsky (born August 7, 1954) is a Russian-born American endocrinologist. His research interests include mechanisms of insulin action in the ovary, interactions between energy metabolism and reproduction, endocrinological aspects of AIDS, and clinical outcomes in diabetes. He has authored over 100 publications and has served on the National Institutes of Health's review committees and on the editorial boards of the Journal of Clinical Endocrinology and Metabolism and other endocrine journals.

As of 2014 he is a professor of medicine at Hofstra Northwell School of Medicine in Hempstead, New York, and Chief of the Division of Endocrinology at Lenox Hill Hospital in Manhattan, New York.

== Early life, career ==
Leonid Poretsky was born on August 7, 1954, in Leningrad, Russian SSR. His mother, Nina, was a well known pediatrician from Bobruisk, Belarus who lived and worked in Leningrad. His father was a prominent engineer. Poretsky graduated from First (Pavlov) Medical Institute in Leningrad (now St. Petersburg State Medical University), cum laude in 1977.

He immigrated with his family to the United States in 1979. Upon completing his internal medicine residency program, he began a fellowship in endocrinology and metabolism at Boston's Beth Israel Hospital (now Beth Israel Deaconess Medical Center). He also completed a research fellowship in medicine at Harvard Medical School (1983–1985), where he was mentored by Dr. Jeffrey Flier.

=== Beth Israel Medical Center ===
While at Beth Israel Medical Center (2000–2014), Poretsky served as chief of the Division of Endocrinology, vice-chairman for research, and interim chairman in the Department of Medicine. He held the Gerald J. Friedman endowed chair in endocrinology and metabolism at Beth Israel Medical Center and was a founding director of the Gerald J. Friedman Diabetes Institute.

Gerald J. Friedman Diabetes Institute is an education, clinical management and research program focused on diabetes which requires no insurance or physician referral. At the institute Poretsky chairs the annual Friedman Fellows Symposia, which present the work of fellows from around the US supported by The Gerald J. and Dorothy R. Friedman New York Foundation for Medical Research.

=== Lenox Hill Hospital ===
In September 2014, Dr. Poretsky joined the staff of Lenox Hill Hospital as its Chief of the Division of Endocrinology. An endocrinology fellowship program was initiated in July 2016 and a new site for the Gerald J. and Dorothy R. Friedman Diabetes Institute at Lenox Hill Hospital opened on August 1, 2016. Another specialized program in the division—Friedman Transgender Health and Wellness Program—opened in 2017. The division has received numerous grants from philanthropic organizations, industry and government agencies (New York State Department of Health and the National Institutes of Health). Lenox Hill Hospital is a part of Northwell Health, formerly North Shore – LIJ Health System, a network of hospitals, nursing homes, a medical school, a nursing school, a medical research institute, ambulatory care centers, urgent care centers, a health insurance company, and laboratories.

== Publishing ==
=== Medical texts ===
Poretsky has authored over 100 publications, and has served on the editorial board of the Journal of Clinical Endocrinology and Metabolism, Journal of Diabetes, and other publications.

He contributed to and edited the textbook Principles of Diabetes Mellitus, which has been widely cited and has been published in three editions.

In 2012 he edited Diabetes Mellitus: A Concise Clinical Guide, which covers "the basics of diagnosis, complications, therapies and prevention of diabetes." The book consists of sections originally published in the second edition of Principles of Diabetes Mellitus.

He is also a series editor for "Contemporary Endocrinology" (Springer).

A comprehensive textbook "Transgender Medicine - Multidisciplinary Approach" co-edited by Poretsky and Wylie Hembree, MD was published in 2019 by Springer

In 2023 he co-edited with Dr. Dimitar Avtanski a monograph "Obesity, Diabetes and Inflammation".

=== Public policy ===
Poretsky has been vocal in the media about how health care policy can affect patient care. In July 2012 he wrote an op-ed for Forbes which drew comparisons between the bureaucratic behavior of the American healthcare system and that of the Soviet Union's, which he says "collapsed under the weight of its own bureaucratic inefficiencies two decades ago." This article was followed in 2013 by a publication on the subject entitled "The sovietization of American medicine: Notes from the front lines", which appeared in the Journal of American Physicians and Surgeons.

In 2017, he published a letter about Medicare being allowed to compete with private health insurance plans. In 2021 he was interviewed by USA today regarding transgender health care. In 2023 he published an editorial in POZ magazine regarding government influence in transgender care.

== Notable research ==
=== Insulin effects in the human ovary ===
While working as a research fellow at Harvard in the early 1980s, Poretsky became known for discovering, describing and characterizing insulin receptors in the human ovary.

Before his research, the hormone insulin had been known to primarily regulate glucose and other fuel metabolism in the liver, fat, and muscle. His work established the ovary as a target for regulation by insulin, and introduced a new paradigm for the gonadotropic function of insulin.

Poretsky had been researching the causes of hyperandrogenism (high level of male hormones and male features in females) in patients with extreme forms of insulin resistance, for example in people with insulin receptor gene mutations. Subsequently, Poretsky's work became important for understanding more common disorders, such as polyendocrine metabolic ovarian syndrome (PMOS), which affects up to 10% of reproductive age women and is associated with infertility and diabetes. Poretsky's work helped lead to the use of insulin-sensitizing agents in patients with PMOS.

Poretsky and his coworkers also characterized related receptors in the ovary (insulin-like growth factor receptors, peroxisome-proliferator activated receptor-gamma), embarked on early studies of the newly discovered energy metabolism hormone irisin in reproduction, and conceptualized an insulin-related ovarian regulatory system.

=== AIDS/HIV ===
Another line of Poretsky's research involved endocrine manifestations of acquired immunodeficiency syndrome (AIDS), and includes an early review of endocrinological dysfunction in AIDS patients.

Additionally, in 1987 Poretsky was a key member of the team which described a condition called hyporeninemic hypoaldosteronism, which is characterized by deficiency of adrenal hormone aldosterone, in patients with AIDS. This discovery resulted in introduction of treatment with fludrocortisone, which proved to be extremely effective and almost immediately converted most patients with this condition from being unable to stand (because of a severe drop in blood pressure upon standing) to being mobile and more functional.

He also studied the metabolism of adrenal hormones cortisol and dehydroepiandrosterone (DHEA) in patients with human immunodeficiency virus (HIV).

=== Clinical studies in diabetes ===
Poretsky's other publications address a variety of subjects in diabetes and reproduction. Recent publications include an invited editorial in the Proceedings of the National Academy of Sciences on the role of advanced glycation end products (AGEs) in metabolic disease; a study of the potential new treatment for prevention of diabetic nephropathy (carried out in collaboration with investigators from the Mount Sinai School of Medicine); a review of the role of Vitamin D in human reproduction; and an editorial as well as a clinical research study on the problem of recurrent hospitalizations of patients with diabetes. In 2021 he has published on applications of modern glucose monitoring technology in hospitalized patients with diabetes during COVID 19 epidemic.
