= Thomas G. McGinn =

American physician and researcher

Thomas G. McGinn is an American physician, educator and researcher in evidence-based medicine (EBM), implementation science, big data (AI) and health disparities. McGinn is the senior executive vice president and chief physician executive officer, CommonSpirit Health, one of the nation's largest health systems. At CommonSpirit Health, leads more than 25,000 physicians and advanced practice providers delivering more than 25 million patient encounters annually through more than 2,300 clinics, care sites and 158 hospital-based locations across 24 states. He also oversees CommonSpirit Health's $162 million research portfolio and 3,000-person graduate medical education program. He also serves as Professor of Medicine at Baylor College of Medicine and Clinical Professor of Medicine at Creighton University School of Medicine. McGinn has authored more than 150 peer-reviewed publications.

== Biography ==
McGinn earned his Bachelor of Science at Creighton University in 1982. McGinn graduated from State University of New York (Downstate) in 1989 and completed his residency in Internal Medicine at Albert Einstein College of Medicine/Bronx Municipal Hospital Center in the Bronx, New York in 1992. He continued at Bronx Municipal Hospital Center as Chief Resident from 1992 to 1993. He received his MPH from Columbia University in 1997.

In 1999, McGinn moved to Icahn School of Medicine at Mount Sinai.

In 2013, McGinn moved to Northwell Health, where he was appointed Chair of the Department of Medicine. There, he created and directed the Center for Health Innovations and Outcomes Research (CHIOR).

In 2021, McGinn he moved to CommonSpirit Health, where he serves as senior executive vice president and chief physician executive officer.

McGinn has served as a Principal Investigator on numerous projects funded by the National Institutes of Health (NIH) and the Agency for Healthcare Research and Quality (AHRQ). His work in evidence-based medicine (EBM) has derived and validated clinical prediction rules (CPR), and integrated these rules into electronic clinical decision support systems. He is the author of the clinical prediction rules chapter of the JAMA series Users' Guides to the Medical Literature, publishing articles with a focus on clinical prediction risk and decision-making in primary care.

== Affiliations and positions ==
McGinn was the Chief of the Division of General Internal Medicine at Mount Sinai Medical Center (2001-2011), the president of the Association of Chiefs and Leaders of General Internal Medicine (2010-2011), and Co-Chair of the Health Policy Committee of the National Society of General Internal Medicine (SGIM).

== Awards and honors ==
- 1989 SUNY Downstate Award: Outstanding Medical Student in Area of Public Health
- 1991 Leo M. Davidoff Society Teaching Award, Albert Einstein College of Medicine
- 1998 “Best Doctor,” New York Magazine
- 2000 Outstanding Teaching Award, Department of Medicine, Mount Sinai Medical Center
- 2000 “Best Doctor,” New York Magazine
- 2001 Fellow, New York Academy of Medicine
- 2002 Visiting Professor, Mahatma Gandhi Institute of Medical Sciences, Nagpur, India
- 2003 Visiting Professor, Wake Forest University, Winston-Salem, North Carolina
- 2003 Endowed Professorship: Clifford L. Spingarn, M.D., Professorship in Primary Care Medicine, Mount Sinai School of Medicine
- 2004 Outstanding Alumni: Master Teacher Award in Preventive Medicine SUNY Downstate College of Medicine
- 2005 Top Ten Teachers Award, Department of Medicine, Mount Sinai Medical Center
- 2009 Fellow, Royal College of Physicians of Ireland
- 2025 50 Most Influential Clinicians, Modern Healthcare
