= Russell Tracy =

American epidemiologist and pathologist (1949–2026)

- Born: 1949; The Bronx, New York, US
- Died: April 6, 2026 (aged 76–77)
- Spouse: Paula Tracy

Academic background
- Education: BS, biology, 1971, LeMoyne College; PhD, biochemistry, 1978, Syracuse University
- Thesis: Isolation and characterization of the subunits of cytochrome c oxidase, and their arrangement as determined by immunological probes (1978)

Russell Peter Tracy (1949–2026) was an American epidemiological scientist and pathologist. He was a University Distinguished Professor of Pathology, Laboratory Medicine and Biochemistry at the Robert Larner College of Medicine, University of Vermont.

== Early life and education ==
Tracy was a native of The Bronx, New York, US. He obtained a Bachelor of Science degree in biology from LeMoyne College in 1971. During his undergraduate degree, he dropped a genetics course and took a week off from classes in order to focus on the French philosopher Pierre Teilhard de Chardin. Upon graduating, Tracy considered joining the United States Navy but worked jobs selling Oriental rugs and tending bars before seeing an advertisement for graduate biochemistry work at Syracuse University.

From 1978 to 1983, Tracy served as a postdoctoral fellow at the Mayo Clinic where he evaluated the usefulness of high-resolution two-dimensional gel electrophoresis in clinical chemistry. As a result, he received the 1984 AACC Award for Outstanding Scientific Achievements by a Young Investigator. By the mid-1980s, Tracy began work in cardiovascular clinical trials but eventually focused on epidemiological science.

== Career ==
Following his fellowship, Tracy accepted a professorship opportunity at the Robert Larner College of Medicine (UVM) in 1984. In late 1980s, Tracy became known for performing research on adaptive immune system, coagulation and inflammation in cardiovascular disease (CVD) and other chronic diseases. While working with the Cardiovascular Health Study (CHS), Tracy developed a technique to measure C-reactive protein, and applied it to the CHS while also showing that it was a predictor of heart attack risk. In the late 1990s, Tracy worked alongside Mary Cushman to evaluate and test blood that led to the conclusion that slightly elevated levels of a certain protein could predict cardiovascular disease. From 2001 until 2009, he served as a senior associate dean for research and academic affairs for the Robert Larner College of Medicine before being replaced by Ira Bernstein. Tracy also served on the Fletcher Allen Health Care board of trustees.

During his tenure at UVM, Tracy led the Clinical Laboratory for Biochemistry Research at the Larner College of Medicine's Colchester Research Facility. In 2012, he worked with investigators associated with the Cardiovascular Lifetime Risk Pooling Project to confirm that a person's cardiovascular risk-factor profile at middle age corresponds to lifetime CVD risk. The following year, Tracy also led a study of over 80,000 veterans who were either infected with HIV and uninfected to research their risk of a heart attack. As a result of his work that has "importantly advanced our understanding of cardiovascular diseases and stroke," he received the 2015 American Heart Association's Distinguished Scientist award. He also served two years as interim senior associate dean for research until 2016 when Gordon Jensen was appointed to take his place. In 2019, Tracy was selected as one of three new University of Vermont Distinguished Professors.

== Personal life ==
Tracy was married to Paula, a biochemist, and they had two children together. In 2017, they established a summer program at the Robert Larner College of Medicine for college students interested in attending medical school. He died on April 6, 2026 from complications of a hip fracture.
