= Danbury Hospital =

- Northwell Health

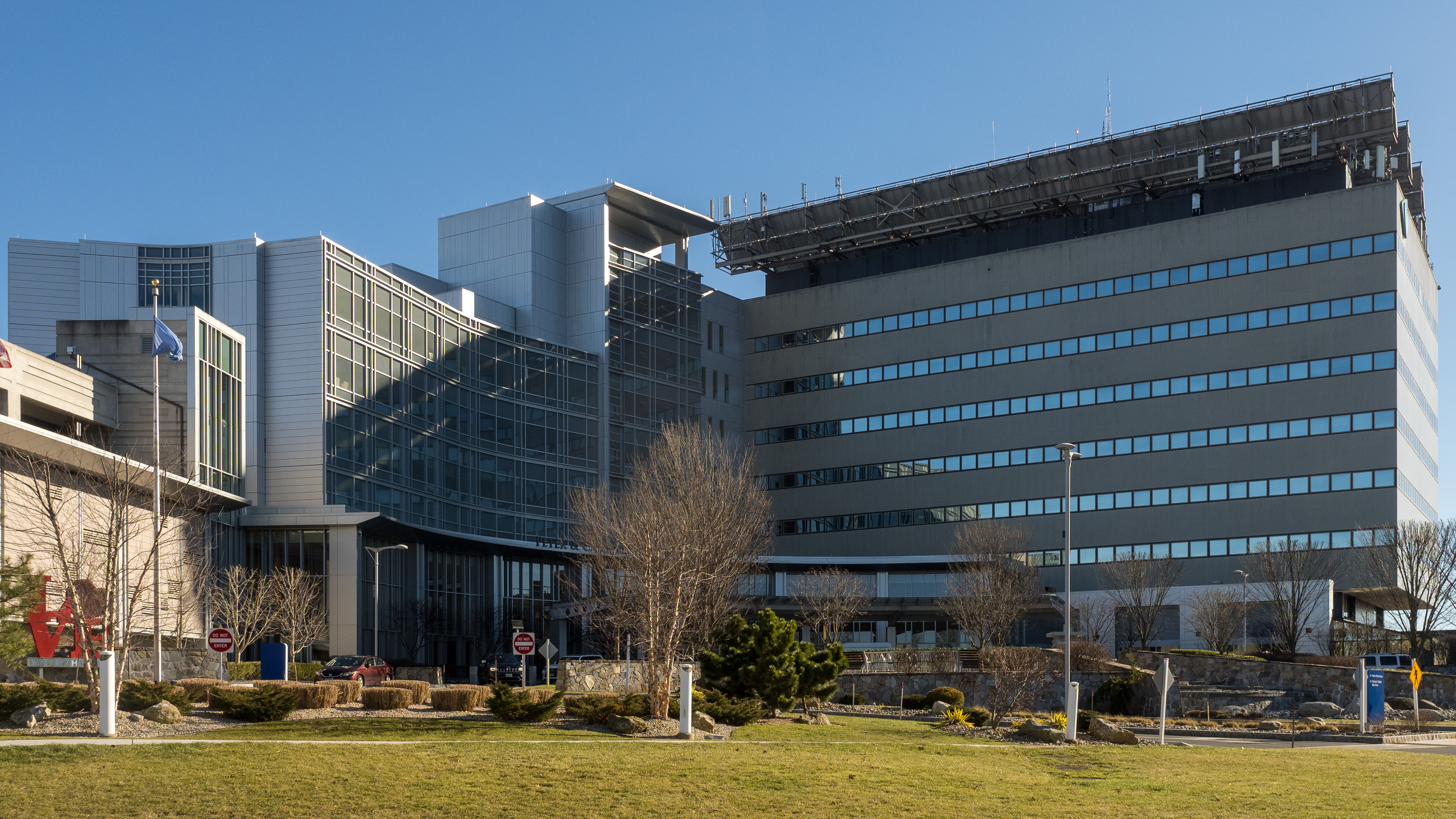
- (2024)

Geography
- Location: Danbury, Fairfield County, Connecticut, United States
- Coordinates: 41°24′19″N 73°26′41″W

Organization
- Type: Regional hospital
- Affiliated university: Yale School of Medicine, New York Medical College, Ross University School of Medicine, University of Vermont College of Medicine
- Network: Northwell Health, formerly Nuvance Health & Western Connecticut Health Network

Services
- Emergency department: Level II trauma center
- Beds: 456

Helipads
- Helipad: FAA LID: 0CT8
Number	Length		Surface
Number	ft	m	Surface
H1	60	18	Asphalt

History
- Founded: 1885

Links
- Website: www.danburyhospital.org
- Lists: Hospitals in Connecticut

Danbury Hospital is a 456-bed hospital in Danbury, Connecticut serving patients in Fairfield County, Connecticut, Litchfield County, Connecticut, and New Haven County, Connecticut as well as Westchester County, New York, Putnam County, New York, and Dutchess County, New York.

The hospital is part of the Northwell Health system.

== Notable departments and offerings ==
- The Praxair Heart and Vascular Center provides medical services to patients with heart disease, including surgical, rehabilitative, and diagnostic care. The center was funded by Linde plc (then Praxair) in 2005, and has been in operation since 2006.
- The Internal Medicine Residency Program is a part of Yale School of Medicine's Affiliated Hospitals Program.
- Horblit Health Sciences Library is a staffed library located on hospital grounds, available as a resource to students enrolled in the Internal Medicine Residency Program.
- Maternity Care is offered through the dedicated Birth Center. The center is designated to care for patients with high-risk pregnancies and offers both prenatal and postpartum care.

== Satellite locations ==
- Brookfield Family Medicine and the Brookfield Specimen Collection Facility, in the Greenknoll Professional Building, 60 Old New Milford Road
- Danbury Diagnostic Imaging Center opened in Danbury in 2001.
- Danbury: Seifert & Ford Family Community Health Center, 70 Main Street in Downtown Danbury
- Danbury Specimen Collection Facility, 41 Germantown Road
- New Canaan Immediate Care, 38 East Avenue
- Ridgefield Diagnostic Imaging (RDI), and the Ridgefield Surgical Center LLC, 901 Ethan Allen Highway-Route 7. RDI offers a "full range of diagnostic services" for radiologic care, according to a hospital news release. The surgical center is a joint venture between Danbury Health Systems and local surgeons and offers outpatient surgery. Both units opened in the summer of 2006 at the same address.
- Ridgefield Specimen Collection Facility, 10 South Street
- Southbury: The Danbury Hospital Health Center, in the Southbury Medical Building at 22 Old Waterbury Road, offers three primary care practices: Primary Care of Southbury, Southbury Pediatrics and Southbury Geriatrics) along with specialist practices (Health Specialists of Southbury, Physical Medicine Center of Southbury, Patient Laboratory Services and Home and Hospice Care).

== Affiliations ==
Danbury Hospital is affiliated with University of Vermont School of Medicine, University of Medicine and Health Sciences, Ross University School of Medicine, New York Medical College. The hospital also affiliated with New York Medical College in 1974 to support pediatrics, psychiatry and surgery, the University of Connecticut's School of Medicine to support nuclear medicine.

Danbury Hospital is a member of the Council of Teaching Hospital and Health Systems (COTH) of the Association of American Medical Colleges (AAMC). Of the 1,100 hospitals involved in graduate medical education in this country, the 400 COTH member institutions train about three-quarters of the residents in the United States.

== History ==
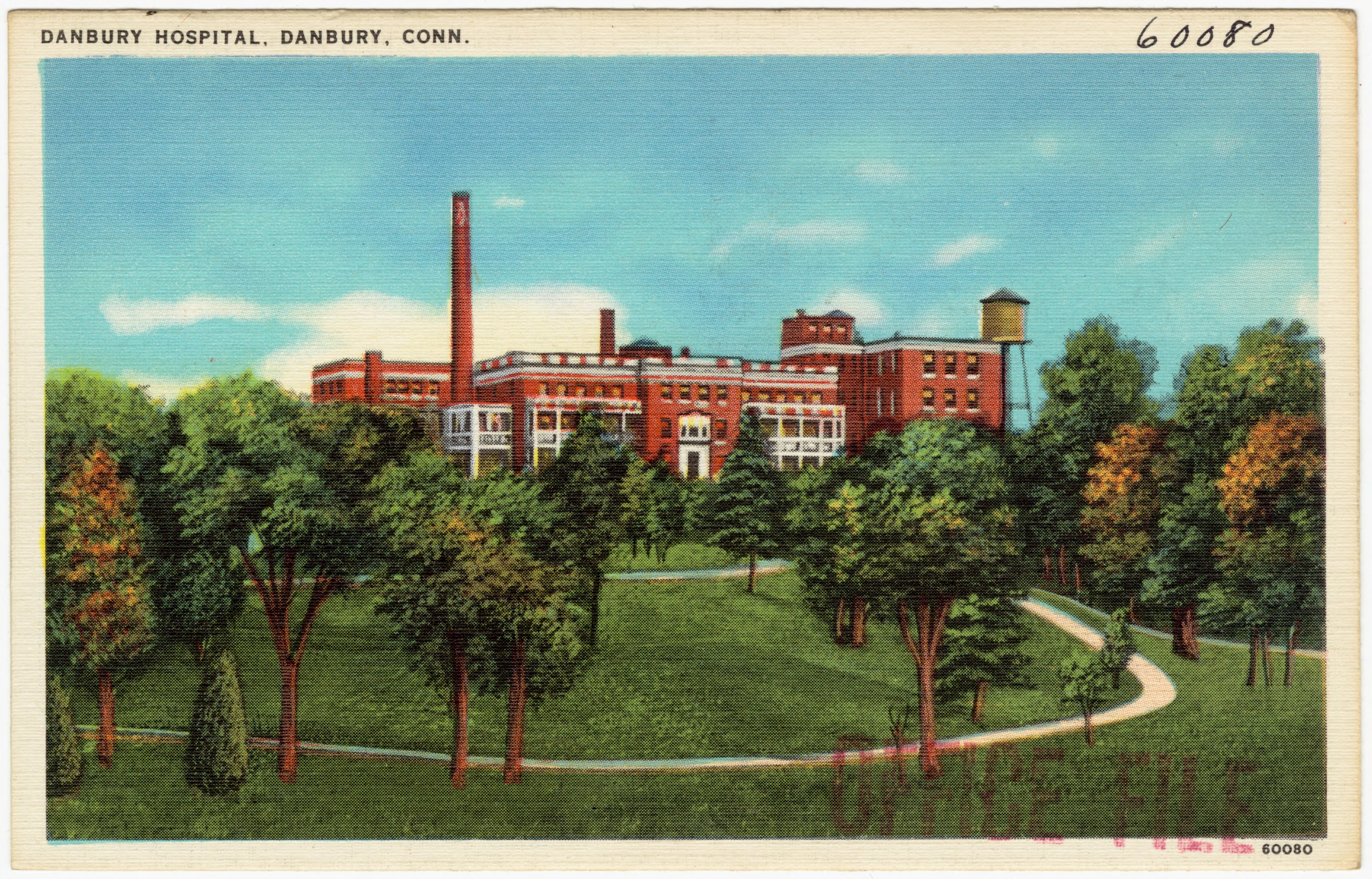
Danbury Hospital, circa 1930

Founded in 1885, Danbury Hospital was a small community hospital for its first 50 years. Its School of Nursing was established in 1893, and the first graduate medical education (GME) program was a one-year general internship approved in 1926. In 1970 the hospital developed a long-range strategic plan which included a proposal to make the hospital a regional teaching hospital. A full-time faculty was formed and eventually evolved into the multi-specialty, not-for-profit practice called Danbury Office of Physician Services, PC. A three-story addition (Stroock Tower) and a two level parking garage opened in January 1985. On June 20, 2014, a new 11 story, 316,000 sf addition to the hospital (The Peter and Carmen Lucia Buck Pavilion) was opened.

== Other area hospitals ==
- New Milford Hospital
- Griffin Hospital in Derby, Connecticut
- Norwalk Hospital
- Stamford Hospital
- Bridgeport Hospital
