= Helene Langevin =

American neurological scientist

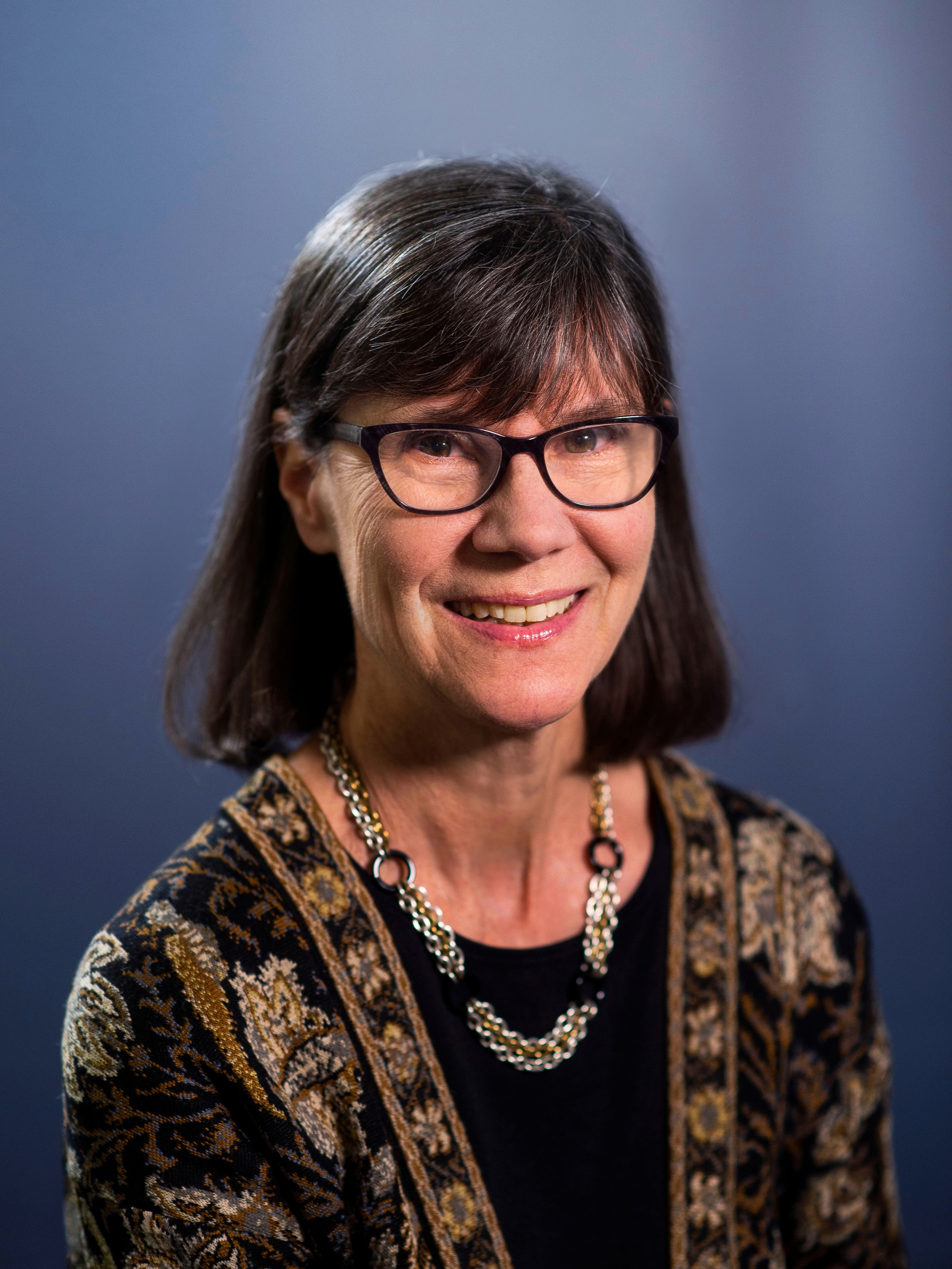

3rd Director of the National Center for Complementary and Integrative Health
- In office November 26, 2018 – November 30, 2025
- Preceded by: Josephine P. Briggs

Personal details
- Education: McGill University
- Website: Office of the Director
- Scientific career
- Fields: Neurological Science
- Workplaces: University of Vermont College of Medicine

Helene Langevin is an American medical scientist who served as the Director of the National Center for Complementary and Integrative Health (NCCIH) at the National Institutes of Health (NIH) between November 2018 and November 2025.

She was a professor in the University of Vermont College of Medicine's Department of Neurological Sciences. She is best known for characterizing certain cellular and mechanical effects of acupuncture. She was also a Professor in Residence of Medicine at Harvard Medical School, Brigham and Women's Hospital. Prior to working at NIH, Langevin was the Director of the Osher Center for Integrative Medicine, jointly owned by Brigham and Women's Hospital and Harvard Medical School.

Langevin was the principal investigator of studies funded by the National Institutes of Health. The Boston Globe describes her as a "celebrity" in the world of acupuncture.

== Biography ==
Langevin received an MD degree from McGill University in 1978. She did a post doctoral research fellowship in Neurochemistry at the MRC Neurochemical Pharmacology Unit in Cambridge, England, a residency in Internal Medicine and a fellowship in Endocrinology and Metabolism at Johns Hopkins Hospital. She was a Professor in Residence of Medicine at Harvard Medical School, Brigham and Women's Hospital. She was also a part-time Professor of Neurology, Orthopedics and Rehabilitation at the University of Vermont College of Medicine. She was the Principal Investigator of two NIH-funded studies investigating the role of connective tissue in low back pain and the mechanisms of manual and movement based therapies. Her previous studies in humans and animal models have found that "needle grasp", the biomechanical component of de qi, may be caused by connective tissue winding around the needle.

Helene Langevin was appointed as Director of the Osher Center for Integrative Medicine at Harvard Medical School and Brigham and Women's Hospital in November 2012 until 2018, where she founded the University of Vermont (UVM) Program in Integrative Health (PIH) in 2005. Following her retirement from the NCCIH, she returns to UVM's Osher Collaborative for Integrative Health as Director of Research in an effort to enhance the competitiveness of UVM's research across multiple disciplines. She also serves as a Senior Advisor on Scientific Communications at the Academic Consortium for Integrative Medicine and Health (ACIMH), a community of individuals across the world dedicated to advancing whole health.

== Research related to acupuncture ==
In December 2001, a study by Langevin and several other researchers at the University of Vermont College of Medicine regarding the "Biomechanical response to acupuncture needling in humans" was published by the peer-reviewed Journal of Applied Physiology, which examined the effects of mechanical tissue stimulation during tissue stretch and during acupuncture.
