= Kelly McQueen =

American anesthesiologist and global health expert

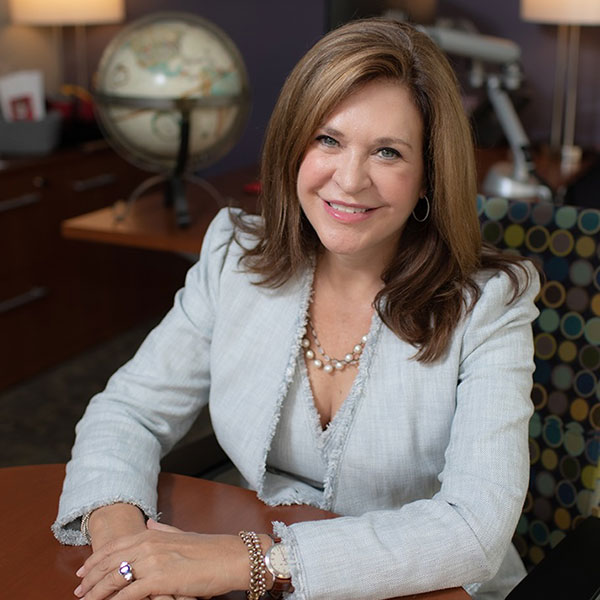

Department of Anesthesiology Chair

Personal details
- Born: June 27, 1962 (age 64) Augusta, Georgia, U.S.
- Scientific career
- Education: Colorado College (BS); Robert Larner College of Medicine (MD); Harvard T.H. Chan School of Public Health (MPH)
- Awards: AOA Honor Medical Society]
- Fields: Anesthesiology, Public health
- Workplaces: UW Health University Hospital

Kathryn Ann Kelly "Kelly" McQueen (born June 27, 1962) is an American anesthesiologist and global health expert. She currently practices anesthesiology at the UW Health University Hospital in Madison, Wisconsin and serves as the chair for the Department of Anesthesiology at the University of Wisconsin School of Medicine and Public health.

== Early years and education ==
McQueen was born at Fort Gordon Hospital in Augusta, Georgia, to Jon Anthony and Betty Kay Green. The family eventually moved to Littleton, Colorado where McQueen and her two sisters grew up, and she graduated from Littleton High School in 1980. McQueen earned a bachelor's degree in Biology from Colorado College in 1984 and graduated with a Doctor of Medicine from the University of Vermont College of Medicine in 1991. She completed her anesthesiology residency at the University of Arizona and Mayo Clinic Arizona in 1994 and 1995 respectively. In 1996 McQueen completed her obstetrical anesthesia fellowship at Mayo Clinic.

Additionally, she earned a Masters of Public Health from the Harvard T.H. Chan School of Public Health and completed a fellowship in Health Policy from American Association for the Advancement of Science in 2002.

== Medical career ==
Upon completing her training, McQueen joined Valley Anesthesiology Consultants, a private practice in Phoenix, Arizona as a partner from 1996–2012. During her tenure in private practice, McQueen focused on OB, Pediatric and Ambulatory Anesthesia. She was actively involved in teaching residents from the University of Arizona and the Mayo Clinic in Scottsdale, AZ. She served as an Adjunct Clinical Professor to the Mayo Clinic, and was the Education Liaison between Valley Anesthesia Consultants and the Mayo Clinic Scottsdale. She was also active in the delivery of humanitarian assistance during this time, often taking months away from her practice to serve overseas.

In 2012, McQueen was recruited to the Department of Anesthesiology at Vanderbilt University Medical Center. She served as the Director to the Vanderbilt Global Anesthesia Programs and Development, and started the Vanderbilt Multidisciplinary Global Journal Club and the Vanderbilt Global Anesthesia Fellowship. Her research programs took her to Guatemala, Ethiopia, Kenya, Mozambique, and South Africa. She taught in Australia annually, at the National Critical Care and Trauma Response Center in Darwin, Australia. She provided many keynote addresses around the globe and scores of academic presentations focusing on surgical and anesthesia infrastructure in low and middle-income countries, and the global anesthesia and patient safety crisis in these same countries. Her research eventually focused on surgical and anesthesia outcomes, especially perioperative mortality rates. She also began working on Enhanced Recovery After Surgery (ERAS) approaches for low and middle-income countries.

In Oct 2019, McQueen moved to Madison, WI to lead the Department of Anesthesiology within the University of Wisconsin School of Medicine and Public Health. Leading the oldest academic department of anesthesiology in the United States offered unique opportunities for McQueen. Her leadership has focused on bringing equity and transparency to all aspects of the department's tripartite mission of clinical excellence, education and training, and research. Since her arrival she has worked to increase Inclusivity and belonging, and to improve Wellbeing. It is her goal to support existing and create new departmental programs, that align with the University of Wisconsin School of Medicine and Public Health and UW Health University Hospital. Early in her tenure, she supported efforts to open a comprehensive Pre-Anesthesia Clinic which opened on Oct 3, 2023. She also worked collaboratively to stand-up a Global Academic Anesthesia Consortium (GAAC), a collaboration between like-minded US Academic Departments of Anesthesiology, committed to education and training in low-income settings. The GAAC is supporting training and education at the University of Zambia, in Lusaka Zambia and the first team began working in November, 2022. McQueen also supports a sustainable Global Anesthesia Program in Rwanda, focusing on Cardiac Anesthesia and Critical Care. Since arriving at the University of Wisconsin, she has also supported departmental and institutional sustainability efforts, inclusive of efforts to eliminate the anesthesia gases most harmful to the environment and decrease OR waste.

Currently, McQueen serves as a Professor and the Ralph Waters Distinguished Chair for the Department of Anesthesiology at the University of Wisconsin School of Medicine and Public Health, and continues to actively research outcomes and opportunities for system improvements in low and middle--income counties. The Wisconsin Idea, a general principle that education should influence people's lives beyond the boundaries of the classroom, was a draw to the University of Wisconsin – Madison for McQueen and is a tenet of her work in Wisconsin and around the world. In 2026, she was selected to participate in the Wisconsin Idea Seminar.

McQueen served on the Council of the Society of Academic Associations of Anesthesiology and Perioperative Medicine (SAAAPM) from 2021 to 2025. From 2022-2025, McQueen served on the executive board for the Multicenter Perioperative Outcomes Group (MPOG). McQueen served on the University of Wisconsin Medical Foundation (UWMF) Board of Directors from Jan 2022 to Dec 2024. She currently serves on the International Society of Surgeons Council and as the Global Health Affairs Chair until April, 2026.

== Public health career ==
After receiving her MPH from the Harvard School of Public Health in 2002, McQueen went on to complete a fellowship at the American Association for the Advancement of Science (AAAS) from 2002–2003.

== Humanitarian aid and disaster relief ==
McQueen's first involvement in humanitarian work was as a medical student in the Dominican Republic. During her residency, she joined an Obstetrical Team for People to People on a trip to Russia in 1992. Since then, she has committed time annually to serving humanitarian and disaster relief organizations including Doctors Without Borders and Operation Smile.

She became a fellow of the Harvard Humanitarian Initiative (HHI) after completing her MPH at the Harvard School of Public Health in 2002. During her time as an HHI fellow, McQueen transitioned from providing service overseas to researching infrastructure and outcomes, with an emphasis on improving surgery and anesthesia in low- and middle-income countries through education and training. She has taught extensively worldwide on topics of Anesthesia for Austere Environments and Anesthesia delivery during humanitarian crises and disaster response. She eventually founded the Burden of Surgical Disease Working Group, and later the Alliance for Surgery and Anesthesia Presence (ASAP) and The Global Surgical Consortium.

== The Global Anesthesia Crisis ==
McQueen's work has additionally focused on the global anesthesia crisis in low and middle-income countries. Her research on access to surgery and the infrastructure needed for safe anesthesia provided early confirmation of the limited number of anesthesiologists and other trained non-physician providers in low- and middle-income countries. McQueen's dedication to improving access to safe anesthesia through education, training, and research played a crucial role in the global surgery events of 2015, which led to a commitment to advancing global surgery and ensuring safe anesthesia in low- and middle-income countries. As a contributing author to the 3rd Edition of Disease Control Priorities Essential Surgery Volume, her chapter on Anesthesia and Perioperative Care influenced the dialogue on the importance of safe anesthesia in all settings where surgery and other procedures are delivered. She is considered one of the global experts on the role of anesthesia in public health and patient safety in low-income countries. McQueen has also contributed to the study of global pain and peer reviewed literature on the topic. She is currently focused on promoting Enhanced Recovery After Surgery in low- and middle-income countries as a future strategy to improve surgical and anesthesia outcomes, and on the collection and analysis of Perioperative Outcomes in LMICs.

=== Humanitarian Service ===
Ordered chronologically:

- 1988: Catholic Mission Service, Dominican Republic
- 1992: People to People Delegation on OB, Russia, Latvia and Lithuania
- 1996: American Society of Anesthesiologists Overseas Teaching Program, Tanzania
- 1998, 1999: Operation Smile, China
- 1999, 2004: Operation Smile, Jordan
- 2000: Operation Smile, Brazil
- 2001: Doctors Without Borders, Sri Lanka
- 2002: Operation Smile, Peru
- 2003: Operation Smile in collaboration with Partners in Health Hinche, Haiti
- 2006: American Society of Anesthesiologists, Haiti
- 2006: Kybele, Ghana
- 2009: American Society of Anesthesiologists, Ethiopia
- 2012: American Society of Anesthesiologists, Rwanda

=== Longitudinal Anesthesia Education and Training in LMICs ===
- 2016 Vanderbilt Kijabe. Kenya Anesthesia Program
- 2021-Present: Global Academic Anesthesia Consortium, Lusaka, Zambia

== Leadership ==
In addition to her leadership within academic anesthesiology and global health, Dr. McQueen has also founded international organizations and led non-profit efforts. She has also served on boards supporting academic anesthesiology, hospitals, and surgical support for low and middle-income countries.

In 2006, McQueen founded the Burden of Surgical Disease Working Group and served as its leader until its transition to the Alliance of Surgery and Anesthesia Presence (ASAP) in 2010. ASAP later became the 6th integrated society of the International Society of Surgeons; she was the inaugural president from 2013–15. In 2007, McQueen developed the idea for the Global Surgical Consortium (GSC), a 501c3 non-profit organization, which was officially established in 2010 and she served as the founder and President of GSC until 2019.

McQueen was one of the founding board members of the G4 Alliance in 2015. She has also served as the American Society of Anesthesiologists Global Humanitarian Outreach Committee Chair from 2009-2015. Since 2011, she has been a board member to the American Society of Anesthesiology Charitable Foundation. From 2017-2019 she served as a board member to the Shalom Foundation. From 2022-24, she served on the Board of Directors of the University of Wisconsin Medical Foundation. She is also a member of the Women in Anesthesia Advisory Board since its founding in 2016. Additionally, McQueen was reappointed as a member of the American Society of Anesthesiology Charitable Foundation Board of Directors until October 2027.

== Charitable activities ==
In 2010, McQueen founded The Global Surgical Consortium, a 501c3 non-profit organization and charity dedicated to providing the evidence and data required for the building of surgical infrastructure in low-income countries. In 2019, McQueen closed the 501c3 due to growth of similar organizations supporting Global Surgery efforts, and to focus her efforts on the global outreach efforts within the Department of Anesthesiology at the University of Wisconsin School of Medicine and Public Health.

== Author ==
McQueen has authored numerous peer-reviews research and review articles, as well as two children's books: What's A Virus Anyway, published in 1990, and Let’s Talk Trash, published in 1992. In 1991, What's A Virus Anyway was awarded the Benjamin Franklin Children's Book Award.

== Publications ==
Her most cited publications are:

- Ozgediz, D; Jamison, D; Cherian, M; McQueen, K (Aug 2008). "The burden of surgical conditions and access to surgical care in low- and middle-income countries". Bulletin of the World Health Organization. 86 (8): 646–47. doi:10.2471/blt.07.050435. PMC 2649455. PMID 18797625. According to Google scholar, the article has been cited 156 times through May 2016
- Dubowitz, G; Detlefs, S; McQueen, KA (March 2010). "Global anesthesia workforce crisis: a preliminary survey revealing shortages contributing to undesirable outcomes and unsafe practices". World Journal of Surgery. 34 (3): 438–44. doi:10.1007/s00268-009-0229-6. PMC 2816796. PMID 19795163. According to Google scholar, the article has been cited 81 times through May 2016
- Bickler, S; Ozgediz, D; Gosselin, R; Weiser, T; Spiegel, D; Hsia, R; Dunbar, P; McQueen, K; Jamison, D (March 2010). "Key concepts for estimating the burden of surgical conditions and the unmet need for surgical care". World Journal of Surgery. 34 (3): 374–80. doi:10.1007/s00268-009-0261-6. PMC 2816802. PMID 19862570. According to Google scholar, the article has been cited 86 times through May 2016
- Notrica, M; Evans, F; Knowlton, LM; McQueen, KA (August 2011). "Rwandan Surgical and Anesthesia Infrastructure: A Survey of District Hospitals". World Journal of Surgery. 35 (8): 1770–1780. doi:10.1007/s00268-011-1125-4. PMID 21562869. S2CID 38556827. According to Google scholar, the article has been cited 73 times through May 2016
- Linden, AF; Sekidde, FS; Galukande, M; Knowlton, LM; Chackungal, S; McQueen, KA (May 2012). "Challenges of surgery in developing countries: a survey of surgical and anesthesia capacity in Uganda's public hospitals". World Journal of Surgery. 36 (5): 1056–65. doi:10.1007/s00268-012-1482-7. PMID 22402968. S2CID 19457290. According to Google scholar, the article has been cited 69 times through May 2016
- Basurto, Xavier; Kingsley, Gordon; McQueen, Kelly; Smith, Mshadoni; Weible, Christopher M. (14 April 2009). "A Systematic Approach to Institutional Analysis: Applying Crawford and Ostrom's Grammar". Political Research Quarterly. 63 (3): 523–537. doi:10.1177/1065912909334430. hdl:10535/2698. ISSN 1065-9129. S2CID 37833743.
- Bickler, Stephen; Ozgediz, Doruk; Gosselin, Richard; Weiser, Thomas; Spiegel, David; Hsia, Renee; Dunbar, Peter; McQueen, Kelly; Jamison, Dean (1 March 2010). "Key Concepts for Estimating the Burden of Surgical Conditions and the Unmet Need for Surgical Care". World Journal of Surgery. 34 (3): 374–380. doi:10.1007/s00268-009-0261-6. ISSN 1432-2323. PMC 2816802. PMID 19862570.
- Jackson, Tracy; Thomas, Sarah; Stabile, Victoria; Shotwell, Matthew; Han, Xue; McQueen, Kelly (1 September 2016). "A Systematic Review and Meta-Analysis of the Global Burden of Chronic Pain Without Clear Etiology in Low- and Middle-Income Countries: Trends in Heterogeneous Data and a Proposal for New Assessment Methods". Anesthesia & Analgesia. 123 (3): 739–748. doi:10.1213/ANE.0000000000001389. PMID 27537761. S2CID 8323268.
- Watters, David A.; Hollands, Michael J.; Gruen, Russell L.; Maoate, Kiki; Perndt, Haydn; McDougall, Robert J.; Morriss, Wayne W.; Tangi, Viliami; Casey, Kathleen M.; McQueen, Kelly A. (1 April 2015). "Perioperative Mortality Rate (POMR): A Global Indicator of Access to Safe Surgery and Anaesthesia". World Journal of Surgery. 39 (4): 856–864. doi:10.1007/s00268-014-2638-4. ISSN 1432-2323. PMID 24841805. S2CID 3347163.
- Jackson, Tracy; Thomas, Sarah; Stabile, Victoria; Han, Xue; Shotwell, Matthew; McQueen, Kelly (27 April 2015). "Prevalence of chronic pain in low-income and middle-income countries: a systematic review and meta-analysis". The Lancet. 385: S10. doi:10.1016/S0140-6736(15)60805-4. ISSN 0140-6736. PMID 26313056. S2CID 19510493.
- Notrica, Michelle R.; Evans, Faye M.; Knowlton, Lisa Marie; Kelly McQueen, K. A. (1 August 2011). "Rwandan Surgical and Anesthesia Infrastructure: A Survey of District Hospitals". World Journal of Surgery. 35 (8): 1770–1780. doi:10.1007/s00268-011-1125-4. ISSN 1432-2323. PMID 21562869. S2CID 38556827.
- LeBrun, Drake G.; Chackungal, Smita; Chao, Tiffany E.; Knowlton, Lisa M.; Linden, Allison F.; Notrica, Michelle R.; Solis, Carolina V.; McQueen, K. A. Kelly (1 March 2014). "Prioritizing essential surgery and safe anesthesia for the Post-2015 Development Agenda: Operative capacities of 78 district hospitals in 7 low- and middle-income countries". Surgery. 155 (3): 365–373. doi:10.1016/j.surg.2013.10.008. ISSN 0039-6060. PMID 24439745.
- Makasa, Emmanuel; Bekele, Abebe; Ameh, Emmanuel A.; Gyedu, Adam; McQueen, Kelly (11 April 2026). "From Vision to Reality: 40 Years of Advancing Safe Surgical and Anesthesia Care Globally 1986-2025". World Journal of Surgery (Special Feature Review). doi:10.1002/wjs.70307. ISSN 0364-2313.
- Lu-Boettcher, Ying Eva; McQueen, Kelly (1 February 2026). "Perioperative Safety and Quality in Low- and Middle-Income Countries". Anesthesia Patient Safety Foundation Newsletter. 41 (1): 28–30.
- Chao, Tiffany E.; Burdic, MacKenzie; Ganjawalla, Karan; Derbew, Miliard; Keshian, Christopher; Meara, John; McQueen, Kelly (2012). "Survey of Surgery and Anesthesia Infrastructure in Ethiopia". World Journal of Surgery. 36 (11): 1. doi:10.1007/s00268-012-1729-3. ISSN 1432-2323.
- Watters, David A.; Hollands, Michael J.; Gruen, Russell L.; Maoate, Kiki; Perndt, Haydn; McDougall, Robert J.; Morriss, Wayne W.; Tangi, Viliami; Casey, Kathleen M.; McQueen, Kelly A. (1 April 2015). "Perioperative Mortality Rate (POMR): A Global Indicator of Access to Safe Surgery and Anaesthesia". World Journal of Surgery. 39 (4): 856–864. doi:10.1007/s00268-014-2638-4. ISSN 1432-2323.
- Ozgediz, Doruk; Jamison, Dean; Cherian, Meena; McQueen, Kelly (August 2008). "The burden of surgical conditions and access to surgical care in low- and middle-income countries". Bulletin of the World Health Organization. 86 (8): 646–647. doi:10.2471/blt.07.050435. ISSN 1564-0604. PMC 2649455.
- Knowlton, Lisa Marie; Chackungal, Smita; Dahn, Bernice; LeBrun, Drake; Nickerson, Jason; McQueen, Kelly (1 April 2013). "Liberian Surgical and Anesthesia Infrastructure: A Survey of County Hospitals". World Journal of Surgery. 37 (4): 721–729. doi:10.1007/s00268-013-1903-2. ISSN 1432-2323.
- Notrica, Michelle R.; Evans, Faye M.; Knowlton, Lisa Marie; Kelly McQueen, K. A. (2011). "Rwandan Surgical and Anesthesia Infrastructure: A Survey of District Hospitals". World Journal of Surgery. 35 (8): 1214. doi:10.1007/s00268-011-1125-4. ISSN 1432-2323.
- Notrica, Michelle R.; Evans, Faye M.; Knowlton, Lisa Marie; Kelly McQueen, K. A. (2011). "Rwandan Surgical and Anesthesia Infrastructure: A Survey of District Hospitals". World Journal of Surgery. 35 (8): 1214. doi:10.1007/s00268-011-1125-4. ISSN 1432-2323.
- Knowlton, Lisa M.; Banguti, Paulin; Chackungal, Smita; Chanthasiri, Traychit; Chao, Tiffany E.; Dahn, Bernice; Derbew, Milliard; Dhar, Debashish; Esquivel, Micaela M.; Evans, Faye; Hendel, Simon; LeBrun, Drake G.; Notrica, Michelle; Saavedra-Pozo, Iracema; Shockley, Ross; Uribe-Leitz, Tarsicio; Vannavong, Boualy; McQueen, Kelly A.; Spain, David A.; Weiser, Thomas G. (1 June 2017). "A geospatial evaluation of timely access to surgical care in seven countries". Bulletin of the World Health Organization. 95 (6): 437–444. doi:10.2471/BLT.16.175885. ISSN 1564-0604. PMC 5463808.
- Solis, Carolina; León, Pablo; Sanchez, Nora; Burdic, MacKenzie; Johnson, Logan; Warren, Hannah; Iddriss, Adam; McQueen, Kelly (2013). "Nicaraguan Surgical and Anesthesia Infrastructure: Survey of Ministry of Health Hospitals". World Journal of Surgery. 37 (9): 1. doi:10.1007/s00268-013-2112-8. ISSN 1432-2323.
