= Robert Larner College of Medicine =

Medical school of the University of Vermont

Coordinates: 44.47807°N 73.19519°W

Larner College of Medicine at the University of Vermont
- Type: Public university
- Established: 1822; 204 years ago
- Parent institution: University of Vermont
- Affiliations: University of Vermont Medical Center
- Endowment: $329.9 million (2026)
- Dean: Richard L. Page, M.D.
- Faculty: 1,986
- Administrative staff: 447
- Students: 431
- Location: Burlington, Vermont, U.S.
- Campus: Urban
- Colors: Green and Gold
- Website: www.med.uvm.edu

The Robert Larner College of Medicine is the medical school of the University of Vermont, a public research university in Burlington, Vermont, United States. Established in 1822, it is the nation's seventh oldest medical school. The primary teaching hospital for the Larner College of Medicine is the UVM Medical Center in Burlington.

The Larner College of Medicine offers both MD and PhD degrees, as well as a Certificate in Integrative Healthcare through the shared program with the University of Vermont College of Nursing and Health Sciences. In 2022, there were 479 medical students, 329 graduate students, and 42 post-doctoral students enrolled. The entering class of 2026 contains 125 students.

The school's medical curriculum is known as the "Vermont Integrated Curriculum." It has both traditional subject-based and more contemporary organ/system-based components. The first 18 months of the curriculum are devoted to basic and clinical science; the remainder of the four-year program largely consists of clinical clerkships.

== Education ==
The Larner College of Medicine offers a Doctor of Medicine degree program into which it enrolls approximately 120 students annually.

According to the institution, the Larner College of Medicine offers an "integrated" medical curriculum. This curriculum, known as the "Vermont Integrated Curriculum", or "VIC", is separated into three levels. Level one/foundations is focused on basic and clinical sciences and lasts 18 months. Level two/clinical clerkships is a 12-month period spent rotating through various clinical clerkships at The University of Vermont Medical Center and other affiliated hospitals. In level three/advanced integration, students continue rotating through clinical clerkships and acting internships with additional responsibilities. The 1-year Certificate in Integrative Healthcare is offered by the University of Vermont Institute in Integrative Health, a shared program between the University of Vermont College of Medicine and the University of Vermont College of Nursing and Health Sciences

== Rank ==
For the 2023-2024 year, The University of Vermont College of Medicine was ranked by U.S. News & World Report as 33rd on the "Top Medical Schools" list.

== Affiliations ==
The Larner College of Medicine is affiliated with four teaching hospitals, with the primary affiliate being the University of Vermont Medical Center in Burlington. A long-standing affiliation with Maine Medical Center in Portland, Maine began in the late 1970s but ended in February 2011. Two new hospitals took the place of MMC: Danbury Hospital in Danbury, Connecticut, Norwalk Hospital and in Norwalk, Connecticut, both within the New York metropolitan area.

== Notable faculty and staff ==
- John S. Bockoven - psychiatrist
- Jan K. Carney - physician, public health researcher, and president of the American College of Physicians from 2025-2026
- Mary Cushman - vascular hematologist, Professor of Medicine and Pathology
- Alan Edward Guttmacher - former professor of pediatrics and medicine, former Director of the National Institute of Child Health
- Albert F. A. King - former professor of obstetrics
- Helene Langevin - director of the National Center for Complementary and Integrative Health, former professor in the Department of Neurological Sciences
- Jerold F. Lucey - former chair of pediatrics, researcher and pioneer in jaundice and pulmonary surfactants, editor-in-chief of Pediatrics until 2009
- Mark T. Nelson - researcher, chair of the Department of Pharmacology, elected to the National Academy of Sciences in 2019
- Richard Page - cardiac electrophysiologist, Dean of the Robert Larner College of Medicine
- Frans Wackers - cardiologist, former associate professor
- Gazi Yaşargil - neurosurgeon who pioneered the field of microvascular surgery

== Notable alumni ==
- Mark H. Beers (M.D. 1982) - geriatrician, creator of the Beers criteria
- Frederick M. "Skip" Burkle Jr. (M.D. 1965) - physician known for his work in human rights advocacy
- Keiji Fukuda (M.D. 1984) - internist, epidemiologist, and former Assistant Director-General of the World Health Organization
- Duane Graveline (M.D. 1955) - aerospace medicine physician and astronaut selected in NASA Astronaut Group 4
- John H. Healey (M.D. 1978) - orthopedic surgeon and Chief Emeritus of Orthopedics at Memorial Sloan Kettering Cancer Center
- Horatio Nelson Jackson (M.D. 1893) - physician and first person to drive a car across the United States
- Richard Marfuggi (M.D. 1976) - plastic surgeon and expert witness
- Kelly McQueen (M.D. 1991) - anesthesiologist, Chair of the Department of Anesthesiology at the University of Wisconsin School of Medicine and Public health.
- John Eugene Osborne (M.D. 1880) - physician and 3rd governor of Wyoming
- Arlie Pond (M.D. 1895) - surgeon, Major League Baseball pitcher
- Sharon A. Savage (M.D. 1997) - pediatrician and oncology researcher who serves as a branch director at the National Cancer Institute.
- Peter Wingfield (M.D. 2015) - actor and anesthesiologist
