= Journal of the American Society of Nephrology =

- Discipline: Nephrology
- Language: English
- Edited by: Josephine P. Briggs

Publication details
- History: 1966-present
- Publisher: American Society of Nephrology
- Impact factor: 10.121 (2020)

Standard abbreviations
- ISO 4: J. Am. Soc. Nephrol.

Indexing
- CODEN: JASNEU
- ISSN: 1046-6673 (print); 1533-3450 (web)
- OCLC no.: 909619963

Links
- Journal homepage; Online Archive

The Journal of the American Society of Nephrology is a peer-reviewed medical journal covering nephrology. It was established in 1966 and is published by the American Society of Nephrology. The editor-in-chief is Josephine P. Briggs. According to the Journal Citation Reports, the journal has a 2020 impact factor of 10.121, ranking it first in the field of nephrology.

== Abstracting and indexing ==
The journal is abstracted and indexed in the following databases:

- CINAHL
- Current Contents/Clinical Medicine
- MEDLINE
- Science Citation Index
- Scopus
