= Stephen Straus =

American virologist and science administrator

Stephen E. Straus
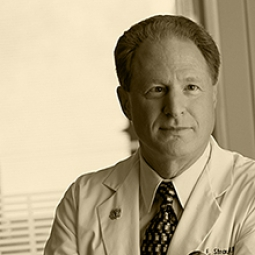
- Born: November 23, 1946; New York City, New York, US
- Died: May 14, 2007 (aged 60); Potomac, Maryland, US
- Education: Columbia University College of Physicians and Surgeons
- Known for: herpesviruses, Myalgic encephalomyelitis/chronic fatigue syndrome, autoimmune lymphoproliferative syndrome
- Scientific career
- Fields: virology, immunology
- Workplaces: National Institute of Allergy and Infectious Diseases, National Center for Complementary and Alternative Medicine

Stephen E. Straus (November 23, 1946 – May 14, 2007) was an American physician, immunologist, virologist and science administrator. He is particularly known for his research into human herpesviruses and chronic fatigue syndrome, and for his discovery of the autoimmune lymphoproliferative syndrome genetic disorder. He headed the Laboratory of Clinical Investigation of the National Institute of Allergy and Infectious Diseases, National Institutes of Health (NIH), and served as the founding director of the NIH's National Center for Complementary and Alternative Medicine.

== Biography ==
Straus was born in New York City in 1946, and grew up in Brooklyn, attending the Yeshivah of Flatbush for Elementary and High School. He attended the Massachusetts Institute of Technology, switching from physics to biology, and gained his BS in life sciences in 1968. He gained his MD from the Columbia University College of Physicians and Surgeons in 1972. He subsequently trained at Barnes Hospital in St. Louis, Missouri, and also held a fellowship in infectious diseases at Washington University in St. Louis.

In 1973–75, Straus researched adenoviruses as a research associate at the National Institute of Allergy and Infectious Diseases (NIAID). He rejoined NIAID as a senior investigator in 1979, working in the Laboratory of Clinical Investigation. He rose to head first the medical virology section and then, from 1991, the entire laboratory. In October 1999, Straus was appointed the National Center for Complementary and Alternative Medicine (NCCAM)'s first director (while continuing his work at NIAID), a position he held until November 2006.

Straus served on the Institute of Medicine's Clinical Research Roundtable and the NIH Steering Committee. He chaired the NIH Committee on the Recruitment and Career Development of Clinical Investigators, as well as multiple committees associated with the NIH Roadmap for Medical Research. He also advised the NIH director, Elias Zerhouni. He was on the editorial boards of the academic journals Journal of Virology and Virology, and co-edited several textbooks, including Fields Virology.

== Research ==
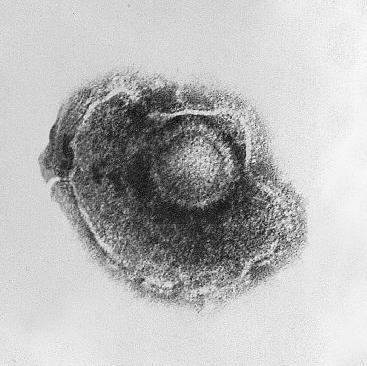
Electron micrograph of varicella zoster virus, one of the herpesviruses that Straus studied

=== Herpesviral and other viral diseases ===
Straus is particularly known for his wide-ranging research on herpesviruses that infect humans, including herpes simplex virus (HSV), varicella zoster virus (VZV) and Epstein–Barr virus (EBV). His studies included herpesvirus pathogenesis, immune responses and transmission, as well as antiviral drugs and vaccines.

He researched the mechanisms by which HSV establishes latency and later recurs. His group was one of the first to show that treating patients with the antiviral acyclovir can prevent genital and oral herpes from recurring. He found that people with asymptomatic genital herpes can transmit the virus to their sexual partners. With Lawrence Corey and David M. Knipe, Straus developed prophylactic and therapeutic vaccines against HSV, including a glycoprotein subunit vaccine.

With William Ruyechan and John Hay, Straus cloned VZV and mapped its genome. They showed that chickenpox (varicella) and shingles (herpes zoster) are both caused by this virus. Straus also studied the persistent pain that can occur after shingles has cleared up. He worked with Mike Oxman and Myron Levin on the Shingles Prevention Study, a large clinical trial which demonstrated that a live-attenuated VZV vaccine is effective against shingles.

Straus discovered that infection with EBV very occasionally results in a life-threatening chronic progressive disease, now called chronic active EBV infection. Other viral diseases Straus worked on include HIV/AIDS, influenza and chronic hepatitis B. He also researched Lyme disease, which is caused by Borrelia bacteria.

=== Myalgic encephalomyelitis/chronic fatigue syndrome ===
Straus started to research what is now known as myalgic encephalomyelitis/chronic fatigue syndrome (ME/CFS) in 1979. Working on the then-current hypothesis that the syndrome might be caused by EBV, he started a clinical trial of acyclovir therapy in 1984. Although the study showed no benefit from the drug, it provided evidence that EBV did not cause the syndrome. In 1988, Straus was one of a group of physicians to propose the name "chronic fatigue syndrome" for the condition, and was subsequently one of the lead authors of the International Chronic Fatigue Syndrome Study Group's guidelines. He also pursued various virological, immunological, neuroendocrine and neuropsychological studies of the syndrome.

=== Autoimmune lymphoproliferative syndrome ===
In the early 1990s, Straus and colleagues discovered autoimmune lymphoproliferative syndrome (ALPS), a rare genetic disorder in which the normal Fas-mediated apoptosis of lymphocytes is disrupted, leading to uncontrolled proliferation. He found mutations in the genes encoding Fas and Fas ligand, as well as caspase-10 and N-Ras, are associated with the disorder. He followed a cohort of over 200 people with ALPS, and showed that they have a substantially elevated risk of developing lymphoma.

== National Center for Complementary and Alternative Medicine ==
NCCAM was founded as an independent NIH center in October 1998, replacing the Office of Alternative Medicine, and Straus was appointed the founding director, responsible for an annual budget of a little under $90 million. He stated in a 2001 interview that he did not use alternative therapies, and he accepted the position because:

I think the only way to change the dialogue on complementary and alternative medicine – what we call CAM – is to have a serious person here at the N.I.H., doing serious work, with serious funding. The fact is that Americans are using complementary and alternative therapies. If the public is spending billions of dollars on these things, they are either deluded en masse, or there is some communal wisdom they are expressing. I believe that the tools of science can provide very powerful answers on what they are doing.

Under his leadership, NIH-funded research into complementary and alternative medicine tripled, with NCCAM funding large (phase III) clinical trials of St John's wort for depression, Ginkgo biloba extracts for dementia, and acupuncture and glucosamine/chondroitin sulfate supplements for osteoarthritis of the knee joint, among other treatment modalities. Early in his tenure as director, Straus prioritised the clinical assessment of treatments widely used in America which had previously shown promising results in small clinical trials. He later wrote: "In the early years of NCCAM, there was a sense of urgency to scientifically assess a range of CAM therapies that had been in long use by the public in the absence of proof of safety or efficacy." By 2006, the center's research focus had shifted away from large clinical trials and towards investigating how treatments might work, as well as the optimal dosing strategy for botanical extracts and their interactions with prescription drugs.

NCCAM was criticised for funding trials of EDTA chelation therapy in coronary artery disease and the Gonzalez regimen in pancreatic cancer. Donald M. Marcus and Arthur P. Grollman, in a 2006 Science opinion article, claimed that the center funded "proposals of dubious merit", and that its research strategy was "shaped more by politics than by science". Straus responded that the center had "made important contributions in a field that is fraught with controversy and challenges" and that it was "applying the same scientific standards to the conduct of research and its review as used by other NIH institutes".

== Awards and honors ==
Straus was an elected fellow of the American Society for Clinical Investigation, the Association of American Physicians and the Infectious Diseases Society of America (IDSA). He was honored with the National ME Fund Award of the Netherlands in 1999, IDSA's John F. Enders Lectureship in medical virology in 2005, and Columbia University College of Physicians and Surgeons's gold medal for Distinguished Achievements in Medicine in 2007. He also received five US Public Health Service medals. In 2009, NCCAM founded a lecture series, the Stephen E. Straus Distinguished Lecture in the Science of Complementary Therapies, as a memorial to him.

== Personal life ==
Straus's wife, Barbara, worked in education; the couple had a son and two daughters. In November 2004, Straus was diagnosed with a brain tumor, from which he died at Potomac, Maryland in 2007, aged 60.
