= Richard Marfuggi =

American medical professional

Richard A. Marfuggi
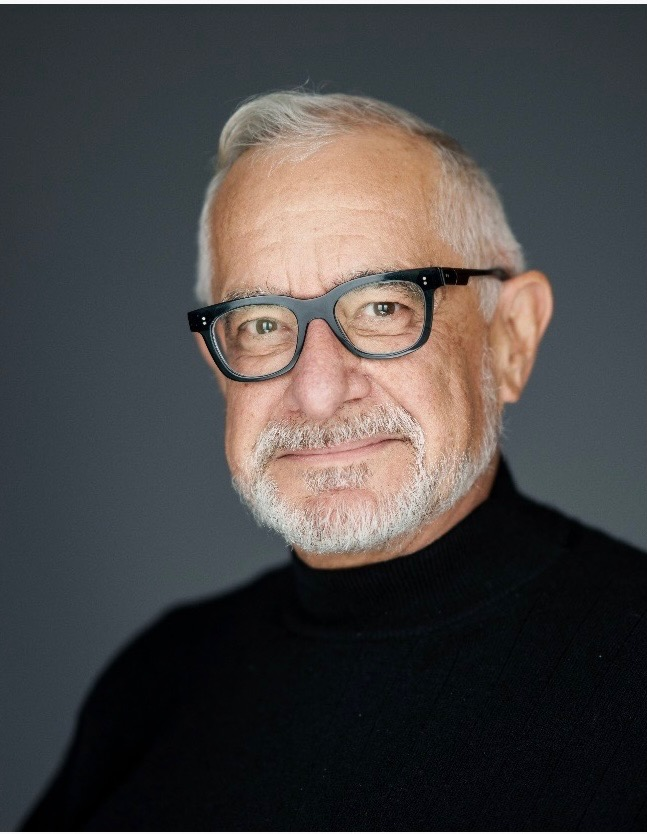
- Marfuggi in 2023
- Born: Vermont, U.S.
- Education: College of the Holy Cross (BA); University of Vermont (MD); Drew University (MMH, DMH)
- Occupations: Author; Plastic surgeon; Expert witness; Public speaker
- Website: askdrm.com

Richard Marfuggi is an American physician, plastic surgeon, and expert witness. He is primarily known for his expertise in the field of plastic surgery, and is a board-certified plastic surgeon. He has been featured in publications like Marie Claire, The Advocate, Cosmopolitan, and Men's Health. He has also provided insight on The Early Show on CBS. Marfuggi is the first medical doctor to hold a doctorate in medical humanities and is the academic director for the National Student Leadership Conference's Medicine & Health Care Program.

== Education ==
Marfuggi graduated from the College of the Holy Cross with a B.A. with honors in 1972. He then earned his Doctor of Medicine (M.D.) from the University of Vermont College of Medicine in 1976. He completed his medical residency at the University of Pittsburgh School of Medicine, Eastern Virginia Graduate School of Medicine, and the Institute of Reconstructive Plastic Surgery at New York University.

In the early 2000s, Marfuggi earned a master's degree and a doctorate in medical humanities from Drew University, becoming the first medical doctor to earn a doctorate in the field.

== Career ==
Marfuggi opened his plastic surgery practice in 1983 in New Jersey and he is currently affiliated with the Morristown Medical Center. One of his first high-profile patients was Marla Hanson, a model who had been the victim of an assault that left scars on her face. In 1998, Marfuggi wrote Plastic Surgery: What You Need to Know-Before, During, and After, a book that details the benefits, risks, and effects of a wide range of plastic surgery procedures. The book discusses topics like breast augmentation, liposuction, recovery tips, and other plastic surgery concepts. Dr. Marfuggi is a member in good standing of the American Board of Plastic Surgery.

After the release of his book, Marfuggi was asked to contribute to a wide array of magazine articles, books, and television programs. In May 2002, he was featured in a piece on CBS' The Early Show called "Mirror Mirror" reported by Julie Chen. In the piece, Marfuggi discussed the aftermath of plastic surgery mishaps and what people should do in the event that they are unhappy with their results. Marfuggi also became an expert witness, often for cases that involved potentially botched plastic surgeries. In 2010, Marfuggi was sued by fellow plastic surgeon Dr. Robert Cattani who contended that Marfuggi's expert testimony in three separate lawsuits against him was defamation. The court threw out Cattani's suit indicating that Marfuggi was immune to litigation for his testimony and that Marfuggi had also told the truth during that testimony. Cattani and his attorney were fined and sanctioned by the court for filing the case, and Cattani would eventually have his medical license revoked.

Over the course of his career, Marfuggi has been a professor and lecturer at institutions like Centenary College of New Jersey, the Drew University Caspersen School of Graduate Studies, and the National Student Leadership Conference. He is currently a board member for Lighthouse Guild International and is the academic director for the National Student Leadership Conference's Medicine & Health Care Program. He also serves on the New Jersey State Medical Society's Biomedical Ethics Committee and is a supernumerary actor at the Metropolitan Opera.
