= John H. Healey =

American cancer researcher and orthopaedic surgeon

- Born: 1952 (age 73–74)
- Education: Yale University (BS); University of Vermont (MD)
- Occupations: Surgeon, researcher

John H. Healey (born 1952) is an American cancer surgeon, researcher, and expert in the surgical treatment of benign and malignant bone tumors and other musculoskeletal cancers. He serves as Chair of the Orthopaedic Service and Stephen P. McDermott Chair in Surgery at Memorial Sloan-Kettering Cancer Center (MSKCC), as well as Professor of Surgery at Weill Cornell Medical College, in New York, NY. In Dec 2025, he retired from MSKCC and joined UT San Antonio Medical Center https://orthopedic.io/surgeon/john-h-healey-md-new-york/

== Career ==
Healey earned a Bachelor of Science degree in biology from Yale University and a Doctor of Medicine degree from the University of Vermont College of Medicine. He completed training in surgery, orthopaedic surgery, and musculoskeletal oncology at the New England Medical Center Hospital in Boston, MA, and at the Hospital for Special Surgery and Memorial Sloan-Kettering Cancer Center in New York, NY.

Healey’s research and clinical activities in the area of hip reconstruction have led to the development of orthopaedic implant devices, including the Healey Flanged Revision Acetabular Component™ and the Healey Hip Swivel™ (manufactured by Biomet Corporation, Warsaw, Indiana).

Specific research areas include orthopaedic reconstructive surgery for metastatic disease, improving outcomes and quality of life for patients with pediatric bone tumors (osteosarcoma, Ewing sarcoma) and understanding the molecular biology of bone tumors. Healey is known by his patients for his bowtie

== Awards and leadership ==
John Healey has received awards from the Japanese Orthopaedic Association, and Peking University.

Throughout his career, he has held various leadership positions in the Association of Bone and Joint Surgeons (past President, 2010-2011), and the Musculoskeletal Transplant Foundation.

In 2026, Dr. Healey received the Nicolas Andry Lifetime Achievement Award from the Association of Bone and Joint Surgeons https://www.abjs.org/abjs-corr-nicolas-andry-award-winners

== Publications ==
Healey has written more than 250 research articles and book chapters on the topics of osteosarcoma; Ewing sarcoma; Paget’s disease; soft tissue sarcomas; giant cell tumor of bone; joint replacement techniques in the surgical treatment of bone tumors; and the use of musculoskeletal surgery to improve pain and function in patients with advanced cancers. He has served as Deputy Editor of Clinical Orthopaedics and Related Research since 2005.
