= New Milford Hospital =

- Northwell Health

Geography
- Location: New Milford, Connecticut, United States
- Coordinates: 41.5818°N 73.4102°W

Organization
- Network: Northwell Health

Services
- Emergency department: Yes
- Beds: 85

History
- Founded: 1921

Links
- Website: www.newmilfordhospital.org
- Lists: Hospitals in Connecticut

New Milford Hospital (founded 1921) is a not-for profit hospital in Litchfield County, Connecticut which serves western and northwestern Connecticut and parts of southeastern New York state. Services provided by the 85-bed hospital include emergency care, one-day surgery, orthopedics, and radiological imaging. The hospital also contains a cancer center and center for sleep medicine. The hospital is accredited by the Joint Commission, the American Osteopathic Association's Healthcare Facilities Accreditation Program and accredited with commendation by the American College of Surgeons' Commission on Cancer. It also earned status as an accredited Breast Center from the National Accreditation Program for Breast Centers in 2011.

From 1995 to 2010, New Milford Hospital was an affiliate of the New York-Presbyterian Healthcare System. Effective October 1, 2010, New Milford Hospital and Danbury Hospital formed the Western Connecticut Health Network, a regional health system.

In April 2019, it was announced that Western Connecticut Health Network would be merging with Health Quest to form Nuvance Health.
