= John Bockoven =

American psychiatrist

John Sanbourne Bockoven (1915 – 2007) was an American psychiatrist. He served as an officer in the U.S. Army Medical Corps of the during World War II.

He served as a research psychiatrist at Boston Psychopathic Hospital, as Clinical Director and then Acting Superintendent of Butler Health Center in Providence, Rhode Island, as Superintendent at the Cushing Hospital at Framingham, Massachusetts, and, starting in 1966, as Superintendent of the Dr. Harry C. Solomon Mental Health Center in Lowell, Massachusetts.

He taught at the Harvard Medical School and the University of Vermont College of Medicine. He was interested in the history of mental hospital care, and wrote extensively about it. In 1964 he received a Certificate in Commendation from the American Psychiatric Association for his service as Chairman of the Committee on History of Psychiatry.

He was born in North Dakota and died in Concord, Massachusetts.

== Publications ==
- Moral Treatment in Community Mental Health, Springer, 1972. OCLC 641639244
- Moral Treatment in American Psychiatry. New York: Springer, 1983. (in 304 libraries according to WorldCat )
