= Sharon A. Savage =

American pediatric hematologist/oncologist

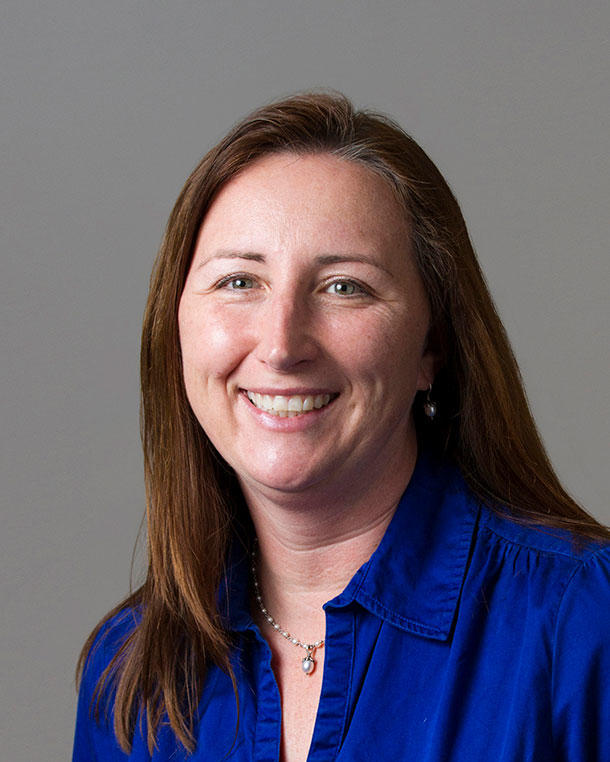
- Savage in 2019
- Education: Worcester Polytechnic Institute; University of Vermont College of Medicine
- Scientific career
- Fields: Pediatric hematology-oncology
- Workplaces: National Cancer Institute

Sharon A. Savage is an American pediatric hematologist/oncologist. She is the clinical director of the National Cancer Institute's Division of Cancer Epidemiology and Genetics.

== Life ==
Savage completed a B.S. in biochemistry at Worcester Polytechnic Institute. Savage earned her M.D. from the University of Vermont College of Medicine, completed residency training in pediatrics at Children’s National Medical Center, in Washington DC, and a fellowship in pediatric hematology/oncology at the National Cancer Institute (NCI) Pediatric Oncology Branch and Johns Hopkins University. She is board-certified in both pediatrics and pediatric hematology-oncology.

In 2006, Savage joined the Clinical Genetics Branch in the NCI Division of Cancer Epidemiology and Genetics (DCEG) as a tenure-track investigator. She was appointed senior investigator in 2012. In 2013, Savage was promoted to branch chief and in 2018, she became the Clinical Director for DCEG. Savage is an elected member of the American Society for Clinical Investigation. She leads clinical, genetic, and epidemiologic studies of individuals and families at high risk of cancer. Her approach combines genomics with clinical genetics and molecular biology to improve understanding of cancer etiology and the lives of patients with complex cancer-prone disorders.
