= Richard Page (professor) =

American physician and educator

- Education: Duke University (BS); Duke University School of Medicine (MD)
- Known for: Cardiac Electrophysiologist
- Scientific career
- Fields: Cardiology; Cardiac electrophysiology
- Workplaces: Robert Larner College of Medicine; University of Wisconsin-Madison; University of Washington School of Medicine; University of Texas Southwestern Medical Center

Richard L. Page is Dean of the Robert Larner College of Medicine at the University of Vermont and a cardiologist with a specialty in cardiac electrophysiology. Page has held this position since September of 2018.

== Early life and education ==
Page was raised in Storrs, Connecticut. He went on to receive his bachelor's and medical degrees from Duke University and the Duke University School of Medicine, followed by a residency in internal medicine at Massachusetts General Hospital in Boston, Massachusetts. He then completed a fellowship in cardiology and subsequently clinical electrophysiology at Duke before joining the Duke faculty.

== Career ==
He later moved to UT Southwestern Medical Center, and in 2002 to the University of Washington School of Medicine, where he served as head of the Division of Cardiology until 2009. He then joined the faculty of the University of Wisconsin-Madison as head of the Department of Medicine and the George R. and Elaine Love Professor endowed chair.

He has served as the president of the Heart Rhythm Society and as president of the Association of Professors of Cardiology.

Page is on the editorial board of the journals Circulation, Heart Rhythm, and the Journal of Cardiovascular Electrophysiology.

Page is chair of the Food and Drug Administration's Circulatory System Devices Panel.
