= Nuvance Health =

New York/Connecticut not-for-profit hospital network

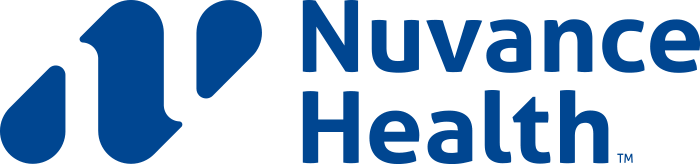
- Company type: Nonprofit organization
- Predecessor: Health Quest & Western Connecticut Health Network
- Founded: August 19, 2019
- Headquarters: Danbury, Connecticut, United States
- Key people: CEO: Dr. John Murphy
- Members: 7
- Number of employees: 14,600 Physicians: 2,600 Ancillary: 12,000

Nuvance Health was an American not-for-profit health system with facilities spanning from New York State's Hudson Valley region to western Connecticut. It employs approximately 2,600 physicians and 12,000 ancillary staff, and serves approximately 1.5 million residents.

It was formed in 2019 when Health Quest and Western Connecticut Health Network merged. In 2025, one year after the deal was announced, Nuvance Health completed its merger with Northwell Health.

== Member hospitals ==
The following hospitals are part of the Nuvance Health system:

New York

- Vassar Brothers Medical Center - Poughkeepsie, NY
- Northern Dutchess Hospital - Rhinebeck, NY
- Putnam Hospital Center - Carmel, NY

Connecticut

- Danbury Hospital - Danbury, CT
- New Milford Hospital - New Milford, CT
- Norwalk Hospital - Norwalk, CT
- Sharon Hospital - Sharon, CT

West and East

The Nuvance Health organization is divided into West and East sections, where the New York locations are generally part of the West section and Connecticut locations are generally part of the East section. Exceptions include Sharon Hospital, which is part of the West section.

== Training programs ==
=== For resident physicians ===
| Specialty | Primary site |
|---|---|
| Anesthesiology | Vassar Brothers Medical Center |
| Dermatology | TBD |
| Diagnostic Radiology | Norwalk Hospital |
| Emergency Medicine | Vassar Brothers Medical Center |
| Family Medicine | Northern Dutchess Hospital |
| General Surgery* | Danbury Hospital |
| General Surgery* | Vassar Brothers Medical Center |
| Internal Medicine* | Danbury Hospital |
| Internal Medicine* | Norwalk Hospital |
| Internal Medicine* | Vassar Brothers Medical Center |
| Neurology | Vassar Brothers Medical Center |
| Obstetrics & Gynecology | Danbury Hospital |
| Pathology | Danbury Hospital |
| Psychiatry | Putnam Hospital |
| Transitional year | Vassar Brothers Medical Center |

*these specialties have multiple residency programs, each headquartered at different hospitals

=== For fellow physicians ===
| Specialty | Primary site |
|---|---|
| Cardiovascular disease | Danbury Hospital |
| Gastroenterology | Norwalk Hospital |
| Minimally Invasive Gynecologic Surgery | Danbury Hospital |
| Pulmonary Medicine | Norwalk Hospital |
| Sleep Medicine | Norwalk Hospital |
| Sports Medicine | Northern Dutchess Hospital/Vassar Brothers Medical Center |
| Critical Care/Pulmonary Medicine | Vassar Brothers Medical Center |
