= Norwalk Hospital =

- Northwell Health

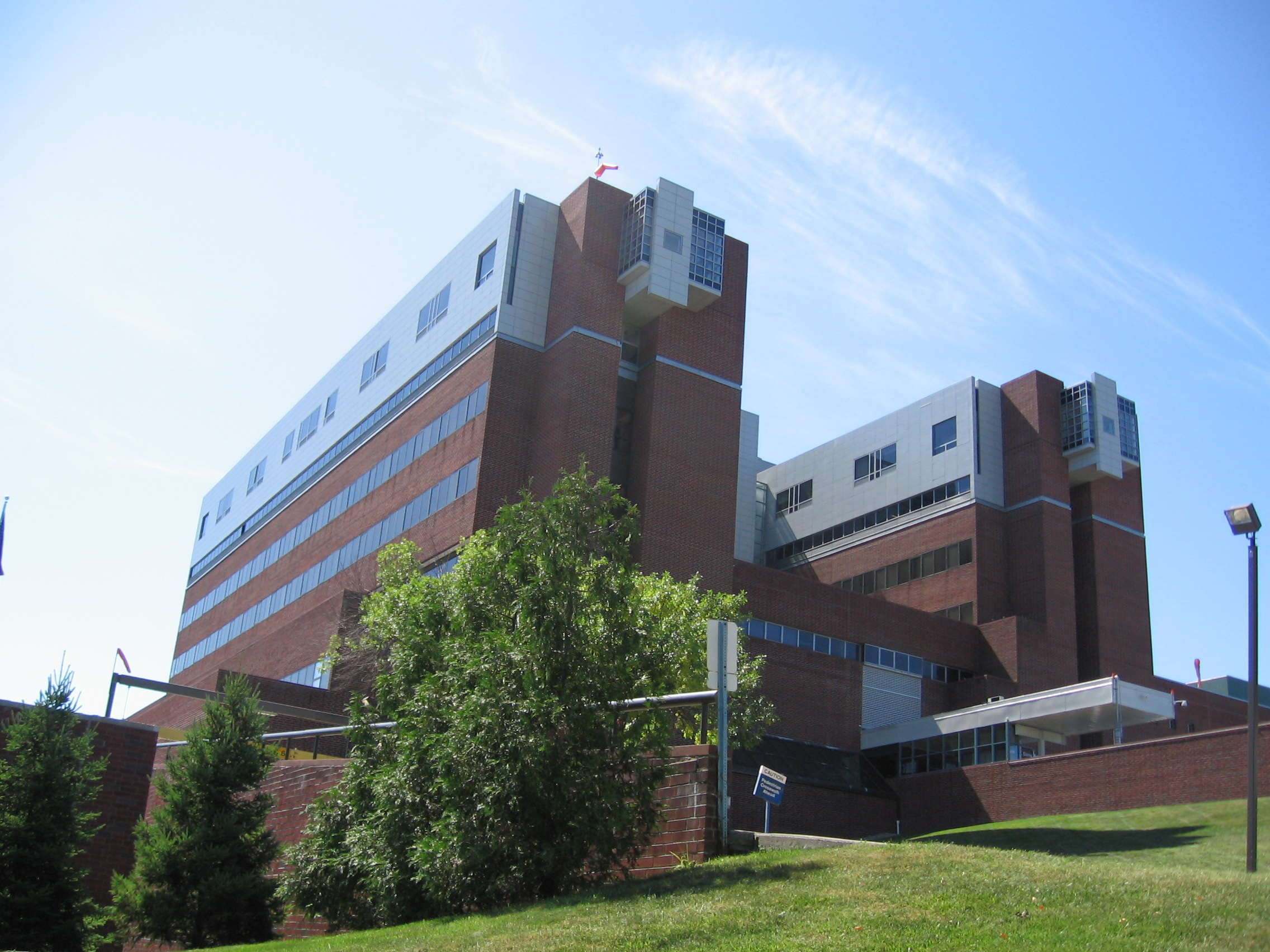

Geography
- Location: 34 Maple Street, Norwalk, CT, Connecticut, United States
- Coordinates: 41.112°N 73.4223°W

Organization
- Type: Community, Teaching
- Affiliated university: New York Medical College School of Medicine, Robert Larner College of Medicine at the University of Vermont, Yale University School of Medicine,
- Network: Northwell Health

Services
- Emergency department: Level II trauma center
- Beds: 328

Helipads
- Helipad: FAA LID: 5CT4
Number	Length		Surface
Number	ft	m	Surface
H1	90x75	27x23	Asphalt

History
- Opened: 1893

Links
- Website: www.norwalkhospital.org
- Lists: Hospitals in Connecticut

Norwalk Hospital is a not-for-profit, acute care community teaching hospital in the Hospital Hill section of Norwalk, Connecticut. The hospital serves a population of 250,000 in lower Fairfield County, Connecticut. The 366-bed hospital has more than 500 physicians on its active medical staff, and 2,000 health professionals and support personnel. The hospital was part of the Western Connecticut Health Network, which included two other hospitals - Danbury Hospital and New Milford Hospital - up until April 2019, when WCHN merged with Health Quest to form Nuvance Health.

== Quality and Safety ==
The hospital was awarded the HealthGrades Distinguished Hospital Award for Clinical Excellence in 2010, 2011 and 2012. HealthGrades, an independent health care ratings organization, analyzed three years of Medicare data and determined that Norwalk Hospital ranked in the top five percent of all hospitals nationally for clinical excellence. This top tier of hospitals was found by HealthGrades to have statistically significantly lower patient mortality and in-hospital complications than other hospitals.

Norwalk Hospital also offers specialty centers and surgical weight loss, sleep disorders, and wound care and hyperbaric medicine. Norwalk Hospital manages and operates the 911 ambulance service for Norwalk and provides paramedic services for the towns of Wilton, Weston, Westport and New Canaan.

Norwalk Hospital is a major landowner in the Spring Hill neighborhood. Aside from the land on which the hospital buildings are located, the hospital owns more than a dozen parcels totaling roughly six acres on Truman, Stevens and Maple Streets, Magnolia Avenue and Rhodonolia. The parcels contain houses, condominiums and medical facilities.

== Education ==
Some of Norwalk Hospital's medical education programs are affiliated with the Yale School of Medicine. The Department of Medicine-based Internal Medicine Residency is recognized as high quality with graduates going on to practice and pursue fellowships at leading health care institutions. Many of the hospital's physicians engage in research designed to provide patients with new treatments. Norwalk Hospital provides a variety of clinical programs and health education classes to local groups and organizations.

The hospital has a fully accredited, three-year residency program in internal medicine and diagnostic radiology, one-year physician assistant residency programs in surgery and education opportunities in anesthesiology. The Department of Medicine sponsors subspecialty fellowship training programs in Gastroenterology, Nutrition, Pulmonary, Sleep and Critical Care Medicine (in conjunction with the Yale School of Medicine). The Section of Pulmonary Medicine also sponsors a School of Respiratory Care in conjunction with the Norwalk Community College.

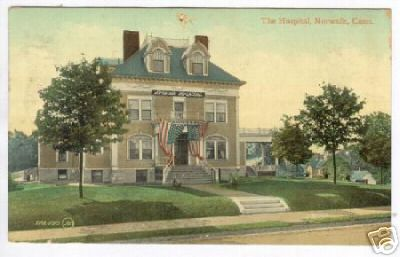
The hospital pictured in an early 20th-century postcard

== Areas of specialization ==
Norwalk Hospital provides a wide range of clinical programs, anchored by six signature services:

- Cancer
- Cardiovascular
- Digestive diseases
- Emergency care with Level II trauma accreditation
- Orthopedics and neurospine
- Women's and children's

The hospital also offers these specialized services:

- Inpatient and outpatient psychiatric services
- Inpatient and outpatient addiction rehabilitation
- Hospital-based emergency medical services, considered one of the best in the state
- Inpatient and ambulatory surgery
- Sleep disorder laboratory
- Acute inpatient rehabilitation unit
- Hyperbaric medicine center

== Expansion plans ==
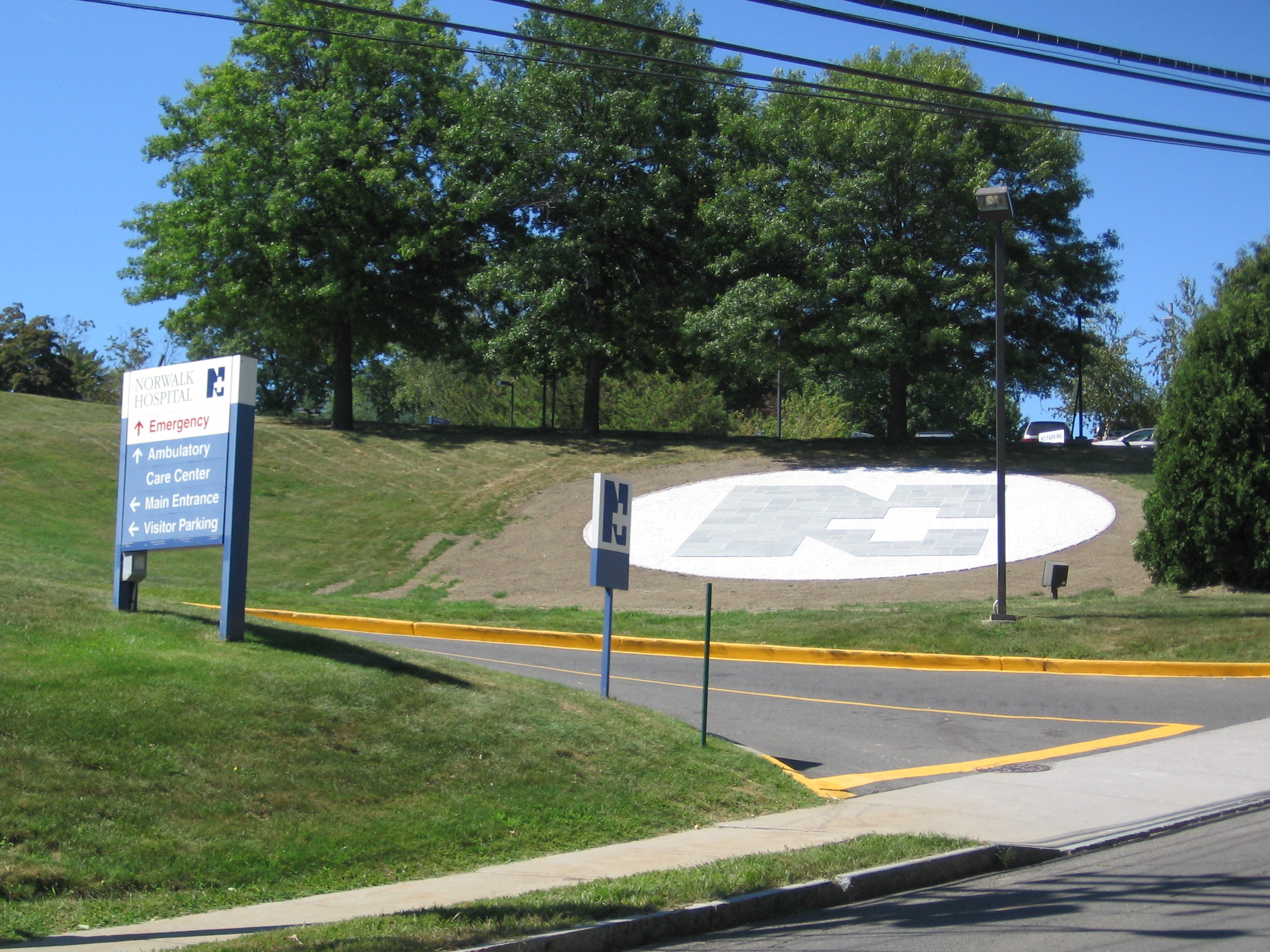
Maple Street entrance and logo

In April 2007, Norwalk Hospital announced that its principal location on Maple Street would be renovated and four new medical facilities would be created, three in Norwalk and one in the Georgetown, Connecticut community that covers parts of Redding, Ridgefield, Weston and Wilton, Connecticut. The Georgetown facility would have 30,000- to 50,000 square feet (5,000 m^{2}) of space.

In May 2008 the Health and Wellness Center of Norwalk Hospital opened in the i.park Norwalk office park spanning the Norwalk-Wilton border on Route 7. Three medical practices staff the 100,000-square-foot (10,000 m^{2}) space, which offers medical and wellness services and the offices of primary care physicians, obstetricians/gynecologists and other specialists.

Also in Norwalk, at the corner of Maple Street and West Avenue, the hospital planned a 50,000-square-foot (5,000 m^{2}) Musculoskeletal Institute to open in 2008. The hospital also opened another 50,000-square-foot (5,000 m^{2}) location for medical and office space on West Avenue.
