= Alliance for Surgery and Anesthesia Presence =

- Predecessor: Burden of Surgical Disease Working Group
- Headquarters: Lupsingen, Switzerland
- Parent organization: International Surgery Society

The Alliance for Surgery and Anesthesia Presence is a multidisciplinary society of surgeons, anesthesiologists, obstetricians and public health specialists organized to improve the delivery of surgical care, particularly in low and middle income countries. The body, named the Burden of Surgical Disease Working Group at its founding in 2007, was renamed in 2010. It became an international society in 2013 under the umbrella of the International Surgery Society.

== History ==
The working group has collaborated with global health institutions such as the Lancet Commission on Global Surgery, World Health Organization's Global Initiative for Emergency and Essential Surgical Care, The World Federation of Societies of Anaesthesiologists, The President and Fellows of Harvard College, The American College of Surgeons, Operation Giving Back, the Disease Control Priorities Network, and the International Surgical Society. The World Journal of Surgery became the official journal of the working group early in the group's tenure, and has published an abundance of data and reports on rural and international surgery. The inaugural meeting of the Burden of Surgical Disease Working Group was hosted by the University of Washington in 2008. Subsequent meetings were hosted by The American College of Surgeons, Operation Giving Back in 2009 and Vanderbilt University in 2010.
