= Western Connecticut Health Network =

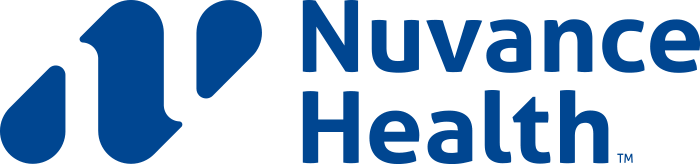
- Industry: Health care
- Founded: 2010; 16 years ago
- Founder: Merger of Danbury, New Milford and Norwalk Hospitlal
- Headquarters: Danbury, Connecticut, United States
- Areas served: Fairfield County, Litchfield County, Putnam County, Westchester County
- Key people: John M. Murphy, MD, president and chief executive officer, Michael Daglio, chief strategy officer
- Services: Hospital network
- Owner: Nuvance Health
- Number of employees: 38,000
- Website: westernconnecticuthealthnetwork.org

Old logo prior to merger with Health Quest

Western Connecticut Health Network was a non-profit group of three Western Connecticut hospitals formed in 2010 by Danbury Hospital, New Milford Hospital and Norwalk Hospital. In 2019, WCHN merged with Health Quest, a chain of hospitals mostly in the Hudson Valley, to become Nuvance Health. In addition to the three hospitals, Western Connecticut Health Network included:

- an integrated physician practice
- an agency for home care and community health services
- a full-service retail pharmacy located at Danbury Hospital
- emergency medical services
- an occupational medicine program, providing services for business and industry

== Patient Care ==
Danbury Hospital (est. 1885) and New Milford Hospital (est. 1921) are accredited by the Joint Commission under separate licenses, maintaining a collective 456 licensed beds and 90,000 emergency visits annually, with 24-hour access to accredited Chest Pain, Primary Stroke and Trauma centers.

Surgical Services include robotic surgery and advanced and minimally invasive techniques in a variety of surgical disciplines, including cardiothoracic, colorectal, gynecologic and breast, neurosurgery, orthopedic joint replacement, plastic/reconstructive, podiatric, spine, urologic, vascular and bariatrics (weight loss surgery).

Danbury Hospital's Praxair Cancer Center and New Milford Hospital's Regional Cancer Center are approved by the American College of Surgeons Commission on Cancer.

Additionally, Danbury Hospital operates a level IIIb Neonatal Intensive Care Unit for newborns, with both hospitals welcoming a collective 2,600 babies every year in two family birthing centers.

== Academics ==
Western Connecticut Health Network operates comprehensive post-graduate medical education programs in anesthesiology, cardiovascular (fellowship), dentistry, internal medicine, obstetrics/gynecology, pathology, psychiatry and surgery, as well as allied health schools and training in medical records, medical technology, radiologic technology, surgical technology and dietetics.

== Research ==
The Danbury Hospital Research Institute opened in 2010 to study a variety of illness and conditions, and to develop targeted therapies for a new era of personalized medicine. The institute is currently working to better understand the genetic basis of disease with the particular focus on women's reproductive cancers. Both hospitals also maintain active clinical research programs, offering clinical trials for patients with cancer and other health concerns.

== Controversy ==
In 2013, Western Connecticut Health Network announced plans to lay off 116 workers in response to state budget cuts. The Danbury Nurses Union voted 96% to reject a proposal to eliminate evening and weekend shift differentials in order to save the jobs of twenty-five nurses, arguing that the hospitals should cut executive pay and use the $35m annual profit to cover the budget shortfall.
