= National Center for Complementary and Integrative Health =

US government agency funding alternative medicine research

- Abbreviation: NCCIH
- Formation: 1991
- Type: Governmental organization
- Headquarters: Bethesda, Maryland
- Location: United States
- Official language: English
- Acting Director: David Shurtleff, PhD
- Parent organization: National Institutes of Health
- Affiliations: United States Public Health Service
- Website: nccih.nih.gov
- Formerly called: National Center for Complementary and Alternative Medicine (NCCAM); Office of Alternative Medicine (OAM)

The National Center for Complementary and Integrative Health (NCCIH) is a United States government agency which explores complementary and alternative medicine (CAM). It was created in 1991 as the Office of Alternative Medicine (OAM), and renamed the National Center for Complementary and Alternative Medicine (NCCAM) before receiving its current name in 2014. NCCIH is one of the 27 institutes and centers that make up the National Institutes of Health (NIH) within the United States Department of Health and Human Services.

NCCIH has been criticized for funding and marketing pseudoscientific medicine and quackery.

== Organization and history ==
=== Overview ===
The Office of Alternative Medicine (OAM) was established in October 1991 by the United States Congress. The OAM was expanded from an office into a center and renamed the National Center for Complementary and Alternative Medicine (NCCAM) in October 1998. It is one of several centers within the National Institutes of Health (NIH).

The founding director of the center was Stephen Straus. In 2008, Josephine Briggs became the second director of NCCAM. The NCCAM was renamed the National Center for Complementary and Integrative Health (NCCIH) in December 2014. Helene Langevin was director from August 2018 to November 2025.

The 2014 name change to NCCIH has been described by critics as an attempt by the center to mitigate criticism by avoiding the term "alternative" and distancing itself from having funded studies of questionable merit.

The 2001 mission statement of the NCCAM stated that it was "dedicated to exploring complementary and alternative healing practices in the context of rigorous science; training complementary and alternative medicine researchers; and disseminating authoritative information to the public and professionals."

As NCCIH, the mission statement is "to define, through rigorous scientific investigation, the usefulness and safety of complementary and alternative medicine interventions and their roles in improving health and health care".

=== As the OAM (1991–1998) ===
Joseph J. Jacobs was appointed the first director of the OAM in 1992. Jacobs' support for rigorous scientific methodology caused friction with Democrat U.S. Senator Tom Harkin and other OAM patrons. Harkin believed his allergies had been cured by bee pollen pills and expressed frustration with the "unbendable rules" of randomized clinical trials, saying, "it is not necessary for the scientific community to understand the process before the American public can benefit from these therapies." Harkin's office reportedly pressured the OAM to fund studies of favored theories, including the use of bee pollen and antineoplastons as treatments. OAM board member Barrie Cassileth publicly criticized the office as a purveyor of nonsense and described it as a "place where opinions are counted as equal to data". After Harkin appeared on television in 1994 with cancer patients who blamed Jacobs for blocking their access to antineoplastons, Jacobs resigned from the OAM in frustration. In an interview with Science, Jacobs criticized Harkin and other politicians for pressuring his office, promoting certain therapies, and, he says, attempting an end-run around objective science."

Harkin drew support from Iowa Democrat Representative Berkley Bedell, who believed that cow colostrum had cured his Lyme disease.

The OAM's budget grew in the 1990s. The office drew increasing criticism for its perceived lack of rigorous scientific study of alternative approaches favoring uncritical boosterism. Paul Berg, a Nobel laureate in chemistry, wrote to the Senate that "Quackery will always prey on the gullible and uninformed, but we should not provide it with cover from the NIH," and called the office "an embarrassment to serious scientists". Allen Bromley, then-president of the American Physical Society, similarly wrote to Congress that the OAM had "emerged as an undiscriminating advocate of unconventional medicine. It has bestowed the considerable prestige of the NIH on a variety of highly dubious practices, some of which clearly violate basic laws of physics". Leon Jaroff, writing for The New York Times in 1997, described the OAM as "Tom Harkin's folly".

In 1995, Wayne Jonas, a promoter of homeopathy and political ally of Harkin, became the director of the OAM, and continued in that role until 1999. In 1997, the NCCAM budget was increased from $12 million to $20 million annually. From 1990 to 1997, use of alternative medicine in the US increased by 25%, with a corresponding 50% increase in expenditures. The OAM drew increasing criticism from eminent members of the scientific community with letters to the Senate Appropriations Committee when discussion of renewal of funding OAM came up. In 1998, the President of the North Carolina Medical Association publicly called for shutting down the OAM.

In 1998, NIH director and Nobel laureate Harold Varmus came into conflict with Harkin by pushing to have more NIH control of alternative medicine research. The NIH Director placed the OAM under stricter scientific NIH control. Harkin responded by elevating OAM into an independent NIH "center", just short of being its own "institute", and renamed it the National Center for Complementary and Alternative Medicine (NCCAM). NCCAM had a mandate to promote a more rigorous and scientific approach to the study of alternative medicine, research training and career development, outreach, and "integration".

Stephen Strauss was the director of NCCAM from 1999 to 2006. He tried to bring more scientific rigor to the organization. In 1999 the NCCAM budget was increased from $20 million to $50 million. The United States Congress approved the appropriations without dissent. In 2000, the budget was increased to about $68 million, in 2001 to $90 million, in 2002 to $104 million, and in 2003, to $113 million.

=== As NCCAM (1998–2014) ===
In 2008 Josephine Briggs was appointed as director of NCCAM. She was "a nephrologist with impeccable scientific credentials". The appointment was considered surprising since she did not have a complementary and alternative medicine background or integrative medicine background. Writing for Science-Based Medicine, David Gorski states Briggs was in an impossible position: "She was a real scientist trying to impose scientific rigor on an enterprise that was inherently resistant to such an imposition." She attempted to impose a more scientific approach with two long-term strategic plans. The plans used "one of the most harmful tactics of quacks to legitimize their quackery under the banner of 'integrative medicine,' the co-opting of the opioid crisis as an excuse to claim all nonpharmacological treatments for pain as being 'integrative.' The results are threatening great harm to chronic pain patients by misguided governments wanting to force them to undergo quack treatments like acupuncture as a means of getting them off opioids." However, she was able to eliminate studies on homeopathy and tried to counter anti-vaccine beliefs. Energy healing was "relegated to the fringes, if not eliminated". Most of the studies became centered around nutrition, exercise, pharmacognosy, "and other modalities within the realm of science-based medicine".

In 2009, after 17 years of government testing for $2.5 billion, almost no clearly proven efficacy of alternative therapies had been found. Senator Harkin complained, "One of the purposes of this center was to investigate and validate alternative approaches. Quite frankly, I must say publicly that it has fallen short. I think quite frankly that in this center and the office previously before it, most of its focus has been on disproving things rather than seeking out and approving." Members of the scientific community criticized this comment as showing Harkin did not understand the basics of scientific inquiry, which tests hypotheses, but never intentionally attempts to "validate approaches". In 2009, the NCCAM's yearly budget was increased to about $122 million. Overall NIH funding for CAM research increased to $300 million by 2009. By 2009, Americans were spending $34 billion annually on CAM.

In 2012, the Journal of the American Medical Association (JAMA) published a criticism that NCCAM had funded study after study, but had "failed to prove that complementary or alternative therapies are anything more than placebos". The JAMA criticism pointed to large wasting of research money on testing scientifically implausible treatments, citing "NCCAM officials spending $374,000 to find that inhaling lemon and lavender scents does not promote wound healing; $750,000 to find that prayer does not cure AIDS or hasten recovery from breast-reconstruction surgery; $390,000 to find that ancient Indian remedies do not control type 2 diabetes; $700,000 to find that magnets do not treat arthritis, carpal tunnel syndrome, or migraine headaches; and $406,000 to find that coffee enemas do not cure pancreatic cancer." It was pointed out that the public generally ignored negative results from testing, that people continue to "believe what they want to believe, arguing that it does not matter what the data show: They know what works for them". Continued increasing use of CAM products was also blamed on the lack of FDA ability to regulate alternative products, where negative studies do not result in FDA warnings or FDA-mandated changes on labeling, whereby few consumers are aware that many claims of many supplements were found not to be supported.

=== As NCCIH (2014–present) ===
In 2014, while Josephine Briggs was the director, the NCCAM was renamed the National Center for Complementary and Integrative Health (NCCIH). Briggs retired in October 2017.

On August 29, 2018, the NCCIH announced Helene Langevin as the new director. She was previously the director of the Osher Center and professor-in-residence of medicine at Harvard Medical School. Her medical interests involve connective tissue. Langevin "believes that the stretching of connective tissue is how several CAM modalities 'work,' such as chiropractic, massage, and ... acupuncture". Langevin has been studying acupuncture since the 1990s. At the time of her appointment, Gorski expressed concern that the balance of power at NCCIH would "shift back towards pseudoscience" with a massive budget to fund the shift.

Under Langevin, NCCIH adopted a "whole person health" research framework, investigating how different domains of health—physiology, psychology, and environment—interconnect across the continuum between health and illness. She co-led several trans-NIH initiatives, including the NIH HEAL Initiative on opioid addiction and pain management, and the funding of a Whole Person Reference Physiome and Coordination Center co-funded by 20 NIH Institutes, Centers, and Offices. The NCCIH budget grew to approximately $170 million annually under her leadership.

Langevin retired from NCCIH on November 30, 2025, returning to the University of Vermont as director of research at the Osher Center for Integrative Health. In September 2025, NCCIH reported that its communications team had been eliminated as part of a reduction in force, and that work on a new strategic plan had been put on hold.

==== FY2026 proposed elimination ====
In the FY2026 President's Budget, released in mid-2025, the Trump administration proposed eliminating NCCIH entirely, along with three other NIH institutes, as part of a plan to consolidate NIH's 27 institutes and centers into eight and cut the overall NIH budget by approximately 40%. Congress rejected the proposed cuts on a bipartisan basis. The FY2026 appropriations package provided NIH with $48.7 billion in discretionary funding, an increase of $415 million over FY2025, and did not include the proposed consolidation or elimination of any NIH institutes or centers. NCCIH funding for FY2026 remained unchanged from FY2025.

=== Operations ===
The NCCIH operates under a charter set by the National Advisory Council for Complementary and Integrative Health (NACCIH). The charter states that:

Of the 18 appointed members (of the council) 12 shall be selected from among the leading representatives of the health and scientific disciplines (including not less than 2 individuals who are leaders in the fields of public health and the behavioral or social sciences) relevant to the activities of NCCIH, particularly representatives of the health and scientific disciplines in the area of complementary and alternative medicine. Nine of the members shall be practitioners licensed in one or more of the major systems with which the Center is involved. Six of the members shall be appointed by the Secretary from the general public and shall include leaders in public policy, law, health policy, economics, and management. Three of the six shall represent the interests of individual consumers of complementary and alternative medicine.

=== Directors ===
Past directors 1999 - present

| No. | Portrait | Director | Took office | Left office | Notes |
|---|---|---|---|---|---|
| acting | | William R. Harlan | January 1999 | October 1999 | |
| 1 | | Stephen Straus | October 1999 | November 2006 | |
| acting | | Ruth L. Kirschstein | November 2006 | January 2008 | |
| 2 | | Josephine Briggs | January 2008 | October 2017 | |
| acting | | David Shurtleff | October 2017 | November 2018 | |
| 3 | | Helene Langevin | November 2018 | November 2025 | |
| acting | | David Shurtleff | December 2025 | Present | |

== Research areas and funding ==
=== Research focus ===
NCCIH funds research into complementary and alternative medicine, including support for clinical trials of CAM techniques. The four primary areas of focus are research, research training and career development, outreach, and integration. NCCIH divides complementary and alternative medicine into natural products, including dietary supplements and herbal supplements; mind and body practices, including meditation, yoga, qigong, acupuncture and spinal manipulation (both chiropractic and osteopathic); and other approaches, such as homeopathy, naturopathy, Traditional Chinese Medicine (TCM), and ayurveda.

=== Funding trajectory ===
Since 1999, the division's funding increased more than six-fold. By 2012, OAM and NCCAM spent a cumulative $1.6 billion in grant funding. Between 1999 and 2009, NCCAM supported approximately 50% of the National Cancer Institute spending on CAM, with the total amount spent on CAM during that time frame $2.856 billion.

The NCCIH budget for 2005 was $123 million. For fiscal year 2009 (ending September 30, 2009), it was $122 million.

The NIH has also conducted research in alternative medicine at the National Cancer Institute by the Office of Cancer Complementary and Alternative Medicine which, in 2009, had the same $122 million budget as NCCIH. For FY 2009; NIH's total budget was about $29 billion.

The NCCIH budget for 2015 was $124.1 million. They requested a $3,459,000 funding increase for their 2016 budget.

By FY2023, the NCCIH budget had grown to approximately $170 million annually. The FY2026 President's Budget proposed eliminating NCCIH entirely, but Congress rejected the proposal and maintained NCCIH funding at the FY2025 level.

==== Examples of NCCAM research projects funded prior to 2012 ====
| Grant (USD) | Purpose | Result |
|---|---|---|
| $110,000,000 | 362 projects for diabetes (e.g. whether expressive writing reduces symptoms) | No results reported. |
| $374 000 | Does inhaling lemon, and lavender scents promote wound healing? | No evidence for such. |
| $22,000,000 | Does prayer treat diseases? | No results reported. |
| $417,000 | Does distance healing improve outcome of HIV patients? | "Distant healing or prayer from a distance does not appear to improve selected clinical outcomes in HIV patients who are on a combination antiretroviral therapy.” |
| $823,000 | To study effect of prayer on glioblastoma | No results reported. |
| $390 000 | Can ancient Indian remedies control type 2 diabetes? | No evidence for such |
| $2,000,000 | Can magnets cure arthritis, carpal tunnel syndrome, or migraine headaches? | "[I]mprovements (in pain intensity) did not differ significantly from changes in the Sham group or the Usual Care group." |
| $406,000 | Use of coffee enemas to cure pancreatic cancer | No evidence for curative effects |
| $250,000 in 2012 | Effects of Energy Healers on cholesterol-fed rabbits | No results reported. |

Of 52 CAM clinical trial studies on HIV and Cancer, only 8 reported results.

==== Education ====
NCCAM also funds education and outreach programs. Despite the negative findings on the effectiveness of distance healing, NCCAM awarded $180,000 to a consultant to develop an Internet-based wellness program on the healing by Qigong.

== Criticism ==
NCCIH has been criticized by Steven E. Nissen, Stephen Barrett, and Kimball Atwood, among others, for funding, along with the National Heart, Lung, and Blood Institute, a study of EDTA chelation therapy for coronary artery disease, which lasted about 10 years and cost about $31 million, even though smaller, controlled trials found chelation ineffective. Other NCCIH-funded studies have included the benefits of distant prayer for AIDS, the effects of lemon and lavender essential oils on wound healing, "energy chelation", and "rats stressed out by white noise".

In 2006, NCCIH was criticized in Science with the comment "NCCAM funds proposals of dubious merit; its research agenda is shaped more by politics than by science, and its charter structures it in a manner that precludes an independent review of its performance." The authors suggested that, while it was appropriate to study alternative therapies, the quality of its research was lower than other NIH institutes and that these studies could be performed under the auspices of other institutes within the NIH. As an example, the authors described a trial of gemcitabine with the Gonzalez regimen for stage II to IV pancreatic cancer, in the belief that a deficiency of pancreatic proteolytic enzymes causes cancer. Severe adverse effects were associated with the Gonzalez regimen, and no evidence in peer-reviewed journals supported the plausibility or efficacy of the regimen or chelation therapy.

A 2012 study published in the Skeptical Inquirer examined the grants and awards funded by NCCIH from 2000 to 2011, which totaled $1.3 billion. The study found no discoveries in complementary and alternative medicine that would justify the existence of this center. The authors argued that after 20 years and an expenditure of $2 billion, the failure of NCCIH was evidenced by the lack of publications and the failure to report clinical trials in peer-reviewed medical journals. They recommended that NCCIH be defunded or abolished and the concept of funding alternative medicine be discontinued.

In 2019, an analysis by the Center for Inquiry found that NCCIH was continuing to fund questionable science and that "there is little hope of reforming the NCCIH as it is currently incorporated". It concluded that "There is no legitimate function that the NCCIH can serve that could not be better carried out by other existing organizations within the NIH umbrella."

Writing for Quackwatch in 2023, William London criticized the NCCIH and its article "6 Things To Know When Selecting a Complementary Health Practitioner" for "misleading consumers" and promoting—rather than warning against—complementary health, which "is often a euphemism for quackery."
