= Josephine Briggs =

American nephrologist

Josephine P. Briggs
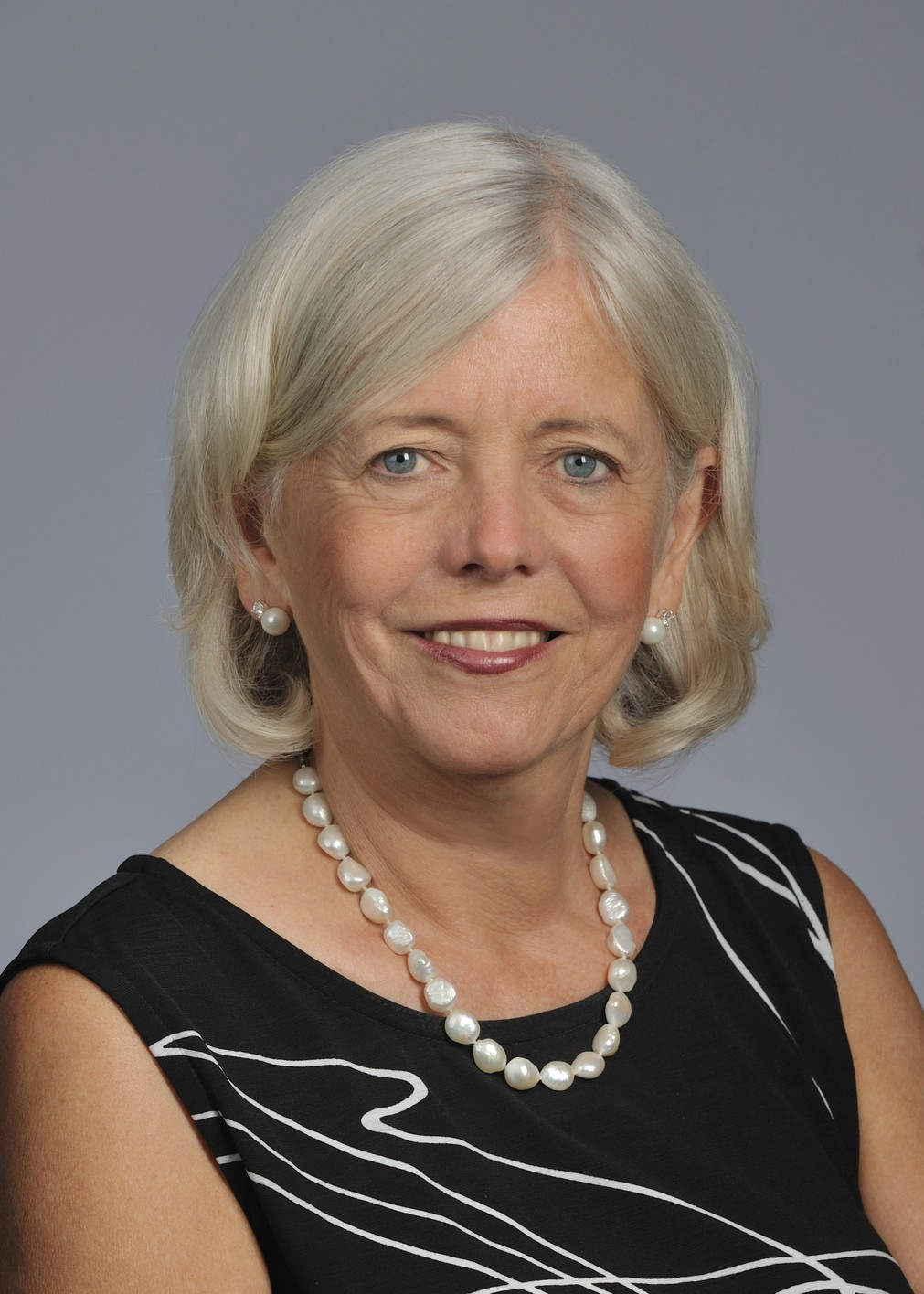
- Born: Toronto, Ontario, Canada
- Education: Radcliffe College; Harvard Medical School
- Known for
- Scientific career
- Fields: nephrology
- Workplaces: Yale School of Medicine; LMU Munich; National Center for Complementary and Integrative Health

Josephine P. Briggs is an American nephrologist and director emeritus of the National Center for Complementary and Integrative Health (formerly the National Center for Complementary and Alternative Medicine), an agency of the National Institutes of Health. She is currently the editor-in-chief of the Journal of the American Society of Nephrology.

== Early life and education ==
Briggs was born in Toronto, Ontario, Canada to a physicist father. She has two brothers. Her family moved to the United States when she was five, and she became an American citizen at age eleven. She excelled at math, physics and other sciences in high school.

Briggs received her bachelor's degree from Radcliffe College in 1966 in biology. She received her M.D. from Harvard Medical School in 1970. She then completed a residency in internal medicine and a fellowship in clinical nephrology at Mount Sinai School of Medicine. She did her postdoc at Yale School of Medicine and worked at LMU Munich for six years as a research scientist.

== Career ==
In 1985 Briggs joined the faculty of the University of Michigan, where she was a full professor in the department of nephrology from 1993 to 1997. In 1997, she joined the National Institutes of Health as director of the Division of Kidney, Urologic and Hematologic Diseases at the National Institute of Diabetes and Digestive and Kidney Diseases. In 2006 she became a senior scientific officer at the Howard Hughes Medical Institute, a position she held until 2008 when she was appointed director of the National Center for Complementary and Integrative Health (NCCIH). In October 2017, she retired from her position as director of the NCCIH; she was replaced by acting director David Shurtleff.

== Views ==
As of 2009 Briggs did not use alternative medicine in her practice. In 2010, a NCCAM-funded study was published which found that echinacea was not effective in the treatment of the common cold. Briggs reacted to the study by saying that the center does not intend to fund any more research into echinacea. In 2012, Briggs told The Washington Post that massage appeared to be an effective treatment for back pain. In 2014, in response to an announcement that the US government would spend millions of dollars on studying pain in members of the military, Briggs said that "The need for non-drug treatment options [for pain] is a significant and urgent public health imperative".
