= Mary Cushman =

American vascular hematologist

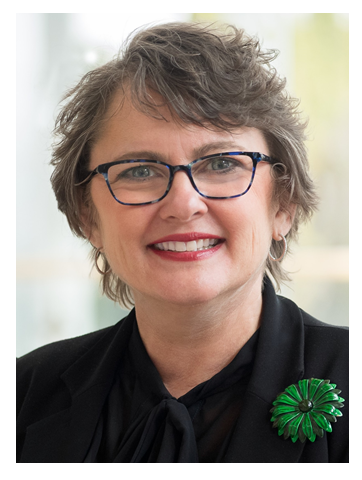

Academic background
- Education: BS, Biology, 1985, University of Vermont; MD, 1989, Robert Larner College of Medicine; MSc, Epidemiology, 1996, Harvard T.H. Chan School of Public Health

Academic work
- Institutions: University of Vermont

Mary Cushman is an American vascular hematologist. She is a Full professor of Medicine and Pathology in the Robert Larner College of Medicine at the University of Vermont.

== Early life and education ==
Cushman grew up in western Massachusetts where she was encouraged by her mother to pursue "an easier, more traditional life and not have to work so hard." In spite of this, she enrolled at the University of Vermont, a school she described as "very progressive," and sought after a medical degree. Cushman earned her Bachelor of Science degree in Biology from the University of Vermont in 1985 before enrolling at their Robert Larner College of Medicine for her medical degree. Upon earning her MD, Cushman earned a research fellowship in Hematology at the University of Vermont and Fletcher Allen Health Care. During her fellowship, she intended to study breast cancer but soon became interested in the hematology consult service. She eventually received her medical degree in 1989 and pursued a Master of Science degree in Epidemiology from the Harvard T.H. Chan School of Public Health.

== Career ==
After completing her fellowship, Cushman joined the faculty at the University of Vermont College of Medicine (UVM) in 1996. In her first year at the college, she received a grant from the American Heart Association's (AHA) former New Hampshire/Vermont Affiliate and volunteered with their organization at both local and national levels. Beginning in 2004, Cushman sat on the editorial board for the journal Archives of Internal Medicine and was later promoted to the rank of Associate Editor for the Journal of Thrombosis and Haemostasis (JTH) in 2007. While serving in these roles, Cushman published evidence that there was an increased risk of venous thromboembolism (VTE) with postmenopausal hormone therapy based on preliminary data from two Women's Health Initiative trials. She also focused on disproving racial and geographical differences in blood clotting and stroke risks. In a co-authored study published in the Annals of Neurology, she concluded that increased stroke mortality rates could not be directly and solely linked to traditional risk factors and external stressors such as poverty and access to care need to be considered. As a result of her research, she was appointed the director of the Thrombosis and Hemostasis Program at the University of Vermont Medical Group at Fletcher Allen, during which she advocated awareness of deep vein thrombosis, and won the 2009 Distinguished Academic Achievement Award.

Following the 2009–10 academic year, Cushman left the Archives of Internal Medicine and became a Senior Guest Editor for the journal Circulation. In 2013, she was recognized by UVM as a "leading expert in cardiovascular disease epidemiology" and received their Senior Researcher of the Year award. She was also appointed to the American Heart Association National Board of Directors and published a new study that found making small lifestyle changes could reduce people's overall risk of having a stroke. The following year, Cushman collaborated with postdoctoral fellow Kristine Alexander to study the link between blood type AB and memory loss. In a study published in the journal Neurology, they found that people with AB blood were more likely to develop thinking and memory problems such as dementia compared to those with other blood types. That same year, she co-authored a study with medical student Sarah Gillett that found a link between cardiovascular risk factors and cognitive impairment. In 2015, while attending a presentation by CEO Joe Golding, Cushman examined the businessman after he began to feel ill and discovered early-stage lymphoma in his leg. As a thank you gift for saving his life, Golding donated $25,000 to UVM for a research project led by Cushman.

On January 10, 2017, Cushman was appointed the inaugural Editor-in-Chief of the International Society on Thrombosis and Haemostasis's open access journal, Research and Practice in Thrombosis and Haemostasis (RPTH). The following year, she was recognized by Clarivate as one of the top highly cited researchers in her field and received the AHA's Population Research Prize for "important studies of cardiovascular disease patterns in populations." In 2019, she was again recognized as one of the top highly cited researchers in her field and joined the AHA's Eastern States Board of Directors. In 2020, she earned the AHA's Award of Meritorious Achievement for encouraging women to join STEM fields.
