= Greensboro Area Health Education Center =

Health education center in Greensboro, US

The Greensboro Area Health Education Center (Greensboro AHEC or GAHEC) changed its name to "Piedmont AHEC" on February 1, 2023. It is one of nine regional centers affiliated with the North Carolina Area Health Education Centers Program. It is administered by the University of North Carolina School of Medicine at Chapel Hill, North Carolina. Greensboro AHEC serves healthcare professionals in an eight-county region including Alamance, Caswell, Chatham, Guilford, Montgomery, Orange, Randolph and Rockingham by providing information resources to both practicing healthcare professionals and students.

Greensboro AHEC provides educational programs and information services targeted toward:

- Improving the distribution and retention of healthcare providers, with a special emphasis on primary care and prevention
- Improving the diversity and cultural competence of the healthcare workforce in all health disciplines
- Enhancing the quality of care and improving healthcare outcomes
- Addressing the healthcare needs of underserved communities and populations

== Mission ==
The mission of Greensboro AHEC has remained constant since its establishment in 1974 as part of The National AHEC Program: to meet the state's health and health workforce needs by providing educational programs in partnership with academic institutions, healthcare agencies, and other organizations committed to improving the health of the people of North Carolina.

== Continuing education programs ==
Continuing education and training programs are designed to meet the needs of health and human service professionals in various disciplines, including:

Allied health With over 100 different occupational titles, this workforce includes:

- Clinical Laboratory Science
- Coding
- Dietietics/Nutrition
- Health Information Management
- Nursing Home Administration
- Occupational Therapy
- Physical Therapy
- Radiation Therapy Technology
- Radiologic Technology
- Recreation Therapy
- Respiratory Care/Cardiopulmonary
- Speech-Language Pathology

Continuing Medical Education
Dentistry
Mental Health
Nursing
Pharmacy
Online Courses

Online courses are available in most healthcare fields at North Carolina AHEConnect.

== History ==
In 1971, Congress funded the development of the AHEC system as a national strategy to improve the supply, distribution, retention, and quality of primary care and other health practitioners in medically under-served areas.

On July 1, 1974, Greensboro AHEC was founded at Moses H. Cone Memorial Hospital through an affiliation with the University of North Carolina School of Medicine serving six counties (Alamance, Caswell, Guilford, Randolph, Rockingham, and Montgomery). Leonard James Rabold, MD, was appointed the first director on November 1, 1974.

Greensboro AHEC is located on the campus of The Moses H. Cone Memorial Hospital in Greensboro, North Carolina.

== See also ==
- Northwest Area Health Education Center
