= Northwest Area Health Education Center =

US research center

The Northwest Area Health Education Center (Northwest AHEC) of Wake Forest School of Medicine is one of nine regional Area Health Education Centers (AHECs) of the North Carolina Area Health Education Centers program. Northwest AHEC is an educational outreach center and training program designed to better the health of the public in its 17-county region. It does this by working to increase the number of health and human service professionals, while also trying to improve their representation throughout the region and their skill quality—especially those who have chosen to work in primary care settings (Pediatrics, Obstetrics & Gynecology, Internal Medicine, and Family Medicine)—through several diverse community groups and partnerships with educational institutions (from primary to post-graduate schools).

Northwest AHEC works toward its mission by providing programs and services through its five core components: Health Careers, Diversity and Recruitment; Health Sciences Student Support; Graduate Medical Education and Patient Services; Continuing Education Activities and Services; and Information and Library Services.

Northwest AHEC has four locations (main office and three regional bases) to meet the needs of its constituents: The main office is at Wake Forest School of Medicine in Winston-Salem, North Carolina; the regional bases are Catawba Valley Medical Center in Hickory, Rowan Regional Medical Center in Rowan County and Watauga Medical Center (part of the Appalachian Regional Healthcare System) in Watauga County. Each of the locations offers library services and training room/meeting facilities.

These 17 North Carolina counties are served by Northwest AHEC: Alexander, Alleghany, Ashe, Avery, Burke, Caldwell, Catawba, Davidson, Davie, Forsyth, Iredell, Rowan, Stokes, Surry, Watauga, Wilkes and Yadkin.

Northwest AHEC continuing education activities and services are facilitated in physical classrooms and meeting venues, video conferencing centers, and virtually though real time event streaming and online courseware.

== History ==
The NC AHEC Program began in 1972 with federal funding and is administered by the University of North Carolina School of Medicine. It is a part of The National AHEC Program. In 1974, with funding from the General Assembly, it became a statewide program. Today, nine regional AHECs comprise the system and are supported primarily by state and local funds. The nine AHEC regions in North Carolina are: Mountain, Northwest, Charlotte, Greensboro, Southern, Wake, South East, Area L and Eastern.

== Internal links ==
- North Carolina Area Health Education Center (NC AHEC)
- Greensboro Area Health Education Center
