= J. Charles Jennette =

Doctor, academic, and author

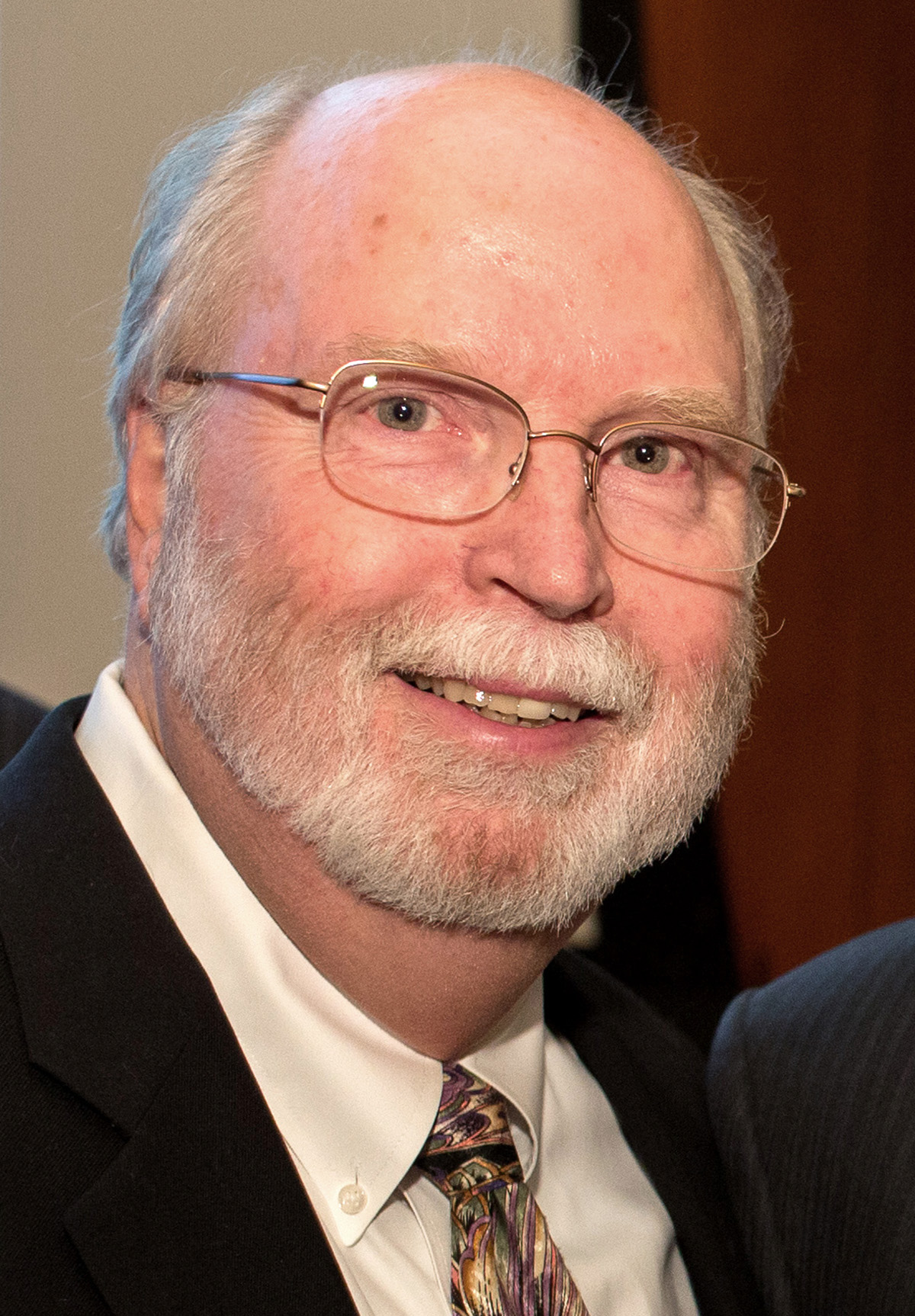
- Born: New Bern, North Carolina
- Occupations: Physician; nephropathologist; scientist; academic; author
- Awards: Heptinstall Lifetime Achievement Award, Renal Pathology Society (2020); Order of the Long Leaf Pine Award, Governor of North Carolina (2020); Distinguished Service Award, Association of Pathology Chairs (2019); Jacob Churg Award, Renal Pathology Society (1994)

Academic background
- Education: BS in Zoology; MD
- Alma mater: University of North Carolina at Chapel Hill; UNC School of Medicine; Scripps Research Foundation

Academic work
- Institutions: University of North Carolina at Chapel Hill; UNC School of Medicine

J. Charles Jennette is a physician, nephropathologist, academic, and author. He served as Kenneth M. Brinkhous Distinguished Professor and Chair of Pathology and Laboratory Medicine at the University of North Carolina at Chapel Hill School of Medicine, and Chief of Pathology and Laboratory Medicine Services at UNC Hospitals from 1999 to 2019.

Jennette's research focuses on understanding the causes of kidney diseases, particularly those induced by inflammatory and immunologic mechanisms, and improving the diagnosis and treatment of these diseases. He has authored and edited books, book chapters and articles in medical journals, and is an editor of four editions of the nephropathology textbook titled Heptinstall's Pathology of the Kidney. He has more than 25 named lectureships including the UNC School of Medicine 2015 Norma Berryhill Distinguished Lecture. He is the recipient of the Order of the Long Leaf Pine Award from the Governor of North Carolina for exemplary service to the State, Distinguished Service Award of the Association of Pathology Chairs, UNC Medical Alumni Distinguished Faculty Award, and Robert H. Heptinstall Lifetime Achievement Award from the Renal Pathology Society.

Jennette served as the founding Secretary Treasurer of the Renal Pathology Society from 1993 until 1998, was elected vice president in 2003, and became president in 2004. He also served as President of the Association of Pathology Chairs from 2008 until 2010.

== Education ==
Jennette received his Bachelor of Science in Zoology from the University of North Carolina at Chapel Hill in 1969 and received his M.D. from the UNC School of Medicine in 1973. From 1973 to 1977 he completed anatomic and clinical pathology residency training at UNC, as well as an immunopathology research fellowship at Scripps Clinic and Research Foundation in La Jolla, California.

== Career ==
Jennette began his faculty career in 1978 as an instructor of pathology at the School of Medicine at the University of North Carolina at Chapel Hill. He was appointed assistant professor of pathology in 1978, promoted to associate professor of pathology in 1985, and Professor of Pathology in 1991. From 1999 to 2019, he served as Kenneth M. Brinkhous Distinguished Professor and Chair of Pathology and Laboratory Medicine at the UNC School of Medicine, and as Chief of Pathology and Laboratory Medicine Services at UNC Hospitals.

From 1978 to 2019, Jennette was Director/Executive Director of the UNC Nephropathology Laboratory. He and his faculty associates established this regional nephropathology diagnostic service.

In 2019, Jennette stepped down as Chair of Pathology and Laboratory Medicine. He continues to hold a faculty position as Professor of Pathology and Laboratory Medicine in the Division of Nephropathology, and Professor of Medicine in the Division of Nephrology and Hypertension at UNC Chapel Hill.

=== Research ===
Jennette's research encompasses clinical research based on evaluation of data obtained from patient medical records, clinical laboratory data, and pathologic evaluation of kidney biopsy specimens; basic research based on experimental investigations using specimens from patients or animal models of kidney disease; and translational research designed to apply (translate) basic research discoveries into improved diagnosis and treatment of disease in patients. Ronald J. Falk has been a colleague in many of his research works.

=== Clinical and clinicopathologic research and scholarship ===
Jennette and his associates have performed and published clinical and clinicopathologic studies, and recommendations for the management, diagnosis, and classification of kidney diseases. He was a member of consensus groups that published recommendations for pathologic diagnosis of kidney transplant rejection, focal segmental glomerulosclerosis, IgA nephropathy, membranoproliferative glomerulonephritis, C1q nephropathy, membranous nephropathy, lupus nephritis, and ANCA glomerulonephritis.

In 1994 and 2012, Jennette and his associate Falk led two international consensus conferences that standardized the names and pathologic features of different forms of vascular inflammation (vasculitis).

Jennette and Falk established the Glomerular Disease Collaborative Network (GDCN) in 1985 to promote collaborative research on glomerular disease among UNC faculty in nephrology and nephropathology, along with community practice nephrologists who refer kidney biopsies to UNC for diagnosis.

Clinical and clinicopathologic research projects have utilized GDCN resources, including the article published by Jennette and Falk in The New England Journal of Medicine in 1988, which reported the discovery that one major antigen target of ANCA is myeloperoxidase (MPO-ANCA) and clarified the diverse clinical and pathologic spectrum of ANCA disease, using data and samples obtained through the GDCN. In 1990, they documented that the other major antigen specificity of ANCA is proteinase 3 (PR3-ANCA).

One of Jennette's clinical research associates is his daughter, Caroline J. Poulton, who is the Research Program Director for the UNC Kidney Center. They are co-authors on 20 journal articles that focus on various clinical aspects of kidney disease with the goal of improving patient outcomes, such as a study to optimize treatment outcomes for patients with ANCA vasculitis.

=== Basic research and translational preclinical animal model research ===
Jennette, in collaboration with Falk, and UNC faculty associates Hong Xiao and Peiqi Hu, and other faculty and trainees, made multiple discoveries about the cellular and molecular mechanisms that cause ANCA disease. He, Falk, and their research associates published the first demonstration that ANCA can activate neutrophils in vitro, and the first in vivo animal model confirming that ANCA antibodies cause glomerulonephritis by inducing glomerulonephritis and vasculitis in mice by intravenous injection of anti-MPO antibodies. This model has been used to make discoveries about the pathogenesis of ANCA disease, including the discovery of a key role for alternative complement pathway activation and C5a receptor engagement, which can be targeted by a novel small molecular inhibitor of C5a receptor (Avacopan). This approach to therapy was FDA-approved for patient care in 2021.

== Personal life ==
Jennette is married to Yvonne Cahoon Jennette. They have two daughters, Jennifer Jennette, and Caroline Poulton; and three grandchildren, Olivia Meyer-Jennette, Augusta Meyer-Jennette, and Quinn Poulton.

== Bibliography ==
=== Selected books ===
- Diagnosis and Management of Renal Disease and Hypertension (1988) ISBN 9780812111293
- Immunohistology in Diagnostic Pathology (1989) ISBN 9780849349874
- Non-neoplastic Kidney Diseases (2005) ISBN 9781881041962
- Primer on Kidney Diseases (2009) ISBN 9781416051855
- Fundamentals of Renal Pathology (2013) ISBN 9783642390791
- Heptinstall's Pathology of the Kidney (2024) ISBN 9781975161538

=== Selected articles ===
- Falk, Ronald J.; Jennette, J. Charles (1988). "Anti-Neutrophil Cytoplasmic Autoantibodies with Specificity for Myeloperoxidase in Patients with Systemic Vasculitis and Idiopathic Necrotizing and Crescentic Glomerulonephritis". New England Journal of Medicine. 318 (25): 1651–1657. doi:10.1056/NEJM198806233182504. PMID 2453802.
- Falk, R. J.; Terrell, R. S.; Charles, L. A.; Jennette, J. C. (1990). "Anti-neutrophil cytoplasmic autoantibodies induce neutrophils to degranulate and produce oxygen radicals in vitro". Proceedings of the National Academy of Sciences. 87 (11): 4115–4119. Bibcode:1990PNAS...87.4115F. doi:10.1073/pnas.87.11.4115. PMC 54058. PMID 2161532.
- Jennette, J. Charles; Falk, Ronald J.; Andrassy, Konrad; Bacon, Paul A.; Churg, Jacob; Gross, Wolfgang L.; Hagen, E. Christiaan; Hoffman, Gary S.; Hunder, Gene G.; Kallenberg, Cees G. M.; McCluskey, Robert T.; Sinico, R. Alberto; Rees, Andrew J.; Es, Leendert A. Van; Waldherr, Rüdiger; Wiik, Allan (1994). "Nomenclature of Systemic Vasculitides". Arthritis & Rheumatism. 37 (2): 187–192. doi:10.1002/art.1780370206. PMID 8129773.
- Jennette, J. Charles; Falk, Ronald J. (1997). "Small-Vessel Vasculitis". New England Journal of Medicine. 337 (21): 1512–1523. doi:10.1056/NEJM199711203372106. PMID 9366584.
- Xiao, Hong; Heeringa, Peter; Hu, Peiqi; Liu, Zhi; Zhao, Minglang; Aratani, Yasuaki; Maeda, Nobuyo; Falk, Ronald J.; Jennette, J. Charles (2002). "Antineutrophil cytoplasmic autoantibodies specific for myeloperoxidase cause glomerulonephritis and vasculitis in mice". Journal of Clinical Investigation. 110 (7): 955–963. doi:10.1172/JCI15918. PMC 151154. PMID 12370273.
- Weening, Jan J.; d'Agati, Vivette D.; Schwartz, Melvin M.; Seshan, Surya V.; Alpers, Charles E.; Appel, Gerald B.; Balow, James E.; Bruijn, J.A.N. A.; Cook, Terence; Ferrario, Franco; Fogo, Agnes B.; Ginzler, Ellen M.; Hebert, L.E.E.; Hill, Gary; Hill, Prue; Jennette, J. Charles; Kong, Norella C.; Lesavre, Philippe; Lockshin, Michael; Looi, Lai-Meng; Makino, Hirofumi; Moura, Luiz A.; Nagata, Michio; International Society of Nephrology Working Group on the Classification of Lupus Nephritis; Renal Pathology Society Working Group on the Classification of Lupus Nephritis (2004). "The classification of glomerulonephritis in systemic lupus erythematosus revisited". Kidney International. 65 (2): 521–530. doi:10.1111/j.1523-1755.2004.00443.x. hdl:20.500.12648/8230. PMID 14717922.
- d'Agati, Vivette D.; Fogo, Agnes B.; Bruijn, Jan A.; Jennette, J.Charles (2004). "Pathologic classification of focal segmental glomerulosclerosis: A working proposal". American Journal of Kidney Diseases. 43 (2): 368–382. doi:10.1053/j.ajkd.2003.10.024. PMID 14750104.
- Jennette, J. C.; Falk, R. J.; Bacon, P. A.; Basu, N.; Cid, M. C.; Ferrario, F.; Flores-Suarez, L. F.; Gross, W. L.; Guillevin, L.; Hagen, E. C.; Hoffman, G. S.; Jayne, D. R.; Kallenberg, C. G. M.; Lamprecht, P.; Langford, C. A.; Luqmani, R. A.; Mahr, A. D.; Matteson, E. L.; Merkel, P. A.; Ozen, S.; Pusey, C. D.; Rasmussen, N.; Rees, A. J.; Scott, D. G. I.; Specks, U.; Stone, J. H.; Takahashi, K.; Watts, R. A. (2013). "2012 Revised International Chapel Hill Consensus Conference Nomenclature of Vasculitides". Arthritis & Rheumatism. 65 (1): 1–11. doi:10.1002/art.37715. PMID 23045170.
- Jennette, J. Charles (2013). "Overview of the 2012 revised International Chapel Hill Consensus Conference nomenclature of vasculitides". Clinical and Experimental Nephrology. 17 (5): 603–606. doi:10.1007/s10157-013-0869-6. PMC 4029362. PMID 24072416.
- Xiao, Hong; Dairaghi, Daniel J.; Powers, Jay P.; Ertl, Linda S.; Baumgart, Trageen; Wang, Yu; Seitz, Lisa C.; Penfold, Mark E.T.; Gan, Lin; Hu, Peiqi; Lu, Bao; Gerard, Norma P.; Gerard, Craig; Schall, Thomas J.; Jaen, Juan C.; Falk, Ronald J.; Jennette, J. Charles (2014). "C5a Receptor (CD88) Blockade Protects against MPO-ANCA GN". Journal of the American Society of Nephrology. 25 (2): 225–231. doi:10.1681/ASN.2013020143. PMC 3904560. PMID 24179165.
- Jennette, J. Charles; Nachman, Patrick H. (2017). "ANCA Glomerulonephritis and Vasculitis". Clinical Journal of the American Society of Nephrology. 12 (10): 1680–1691. doi:10.2215/CJN.02500317. PMC 5628710. PMID 28842398.
- Haas, Mark; Seshan, Surya V.; Barisoni, Laura; Amann, Kerstin; Bajema, Ingeborg M.; Becker, Jan Ulrich; Joh, Kensuke; Ljubanovic, Danica; Roberts, Ian S.D.; Roelofs, Joris J.; Sethi, Sanjeev; Zeng, Caihong; Jennette, J. Charles (2020). "Consensus definitions for glomerular lesions by light and electron microscopy: Recommendations from a working group of the Renal Pathology Society". Kidney International. 98 (5): 1120–1134. doi:10.1016/j.kint.2020.08.006. PMID 32866505.
