= Matthew Nielsen (urologist) =

American urologist

Academic background
- Education: MD, 2002, Johns Hopkins University; MS, Clinical Research, 2012, University of North Carolina at Chapel Hill

Academic work
- Institutions: UNC School of Medicine

Matthew E. Nielsen is an American urologist oncologist and health services researcher. He is a Full professor and Chair of Urology at the UNC School of Medicine. Nielsen joined the faculty at UNC in 2009 as a urologic oncologist and health services researcher after completing medical school and residency training at Johns Hopkins.

== Early life and education ==
Nielsen earned his medical degree from Johns Hopkins University where he stayed to complete his residency in general surgery and urology. From there, he completed his Master's degree in Clinical Research at the University of North Carolina at Chapel Hill in 2012.

== Career ==
Nielsen joined the faculty at the UNC School of Medicine in 2009 as a urologic oncologist and health services researcher after completing his residency training at Johns Hopkins. In this role, he was selected as a Clinical Research Scholar on the UNC Clinical Translation Science Award – K12 Scholars Program to "transform how clinical and translation research is conducted." He was later selected as one of two recipients of the three-year, $101,000 2013 Urology Care Foundation/Astellas Rising Stars in Urology Research Award.

As an associate professor and Director of Urologic Oncology, Nielsen was appointed by the Council of Medical Specialty Societies (CMSS) Board of Directors as the CMSS Representative to the Physician Consortium for Performance Improvement. The following year, he was the lead author on a report from the American College of Physicians’ High Value Care Task Force which questioned the potential harms associated with diagnostic tests but also acknowledged that blood in the urine may be the only warning sign of cancer in the urinary tract of some patients. Nielsen was later named co-director of Cross-Institutional Quality Improvement Implementation efforts with the High Value Practice Academic Alliance (HVPAA).

During the COVID-19 pandemic in North America, Nielsen was appointed to the Centers for Medicare and Medicaid Services Technical Expert Panel to identify, analyze, and prioritize measurement gaps for the 2020 Quality Measure Development Plan Annual Report. He was also appointed Interim Chair of the Department of Urology and promoted to the position of Professor with Tenure. While serving in this role, he collaborated with Lixin Song to use wearable technology to help bladder and colorectal cancer patients catch and address post-surgical symptoms and complications before they require more intensive medical care. In November, Nielsen was included in Castle Connolly Medical Ltd's 2020 Listing of Top Doctors and appointed Chair of the Department of Urology.
