= Point of care medical information summary =

Hippa Software Programs

Point of care medical information summaries are defined as "web-based medical compendia specifically designed to deliver predigested, rapidly accessible, comprehensive, periodically updated, and evidence-based information" to healthcare providers.

== Products ==
- BMJ Best Practice
- DynaMed
- UpToDate

== See also ==
- Clinical decision support system
