= Barbara Murphy =

Barbara Murphy may refer to:

- Barbara Murphy (politician), American politician
- Barbara Murphy (immunologist) (1964–2021), Irish nephrologist
