= FASN =

FASN may refer to

- the FASN gene that encodes Fatty acid synthase
- Fellowship of the American Society of Nephrology
