= Ronald J. Falk =

American clinical nephrologist

- Education: Dartmouth College
- Occupation: Nephrologist

Ronald Jonathan Falk is a clinical nephrologist at the University of North Carolina School of Medicine where he is the Nan and Hugh Cullman Eminent Professor of Medicine. He served as Chair of the Department of Medicine from July 1, 2015 until June 30, 2025. An internationally recognized expert in anti-neutrophil cytoplasmic autoantibody (ANCA)-induced vasculitis, and autoimmune kidney disease, his career as a translational physician-scientist spans more than three decades. His clinical practice and translational research focus on elucidating cellular, tissue, and physiologic changes involved in the development of autoimmune kidney diseases. He has also developed research strategies to study autoimmunity, inflammation, and basic neutrophil/monocyte biology. He was Chief of the UNC Division of Nephrology and Hypertension from 1993 to 2015 and co-founded the UNC Kidney Center in 2005. He continues to serve as Co-Director of the UNC Kidney Center and has held numerous leadership positions such as President of the American Society of Nephrology.

== Education ==
Falk attended Dartmouth College in Hanover, New Hampshire, where he graduated cum laude with a Bachelor of Arts. He earned his MD from the University of North Carolina School of Medicine. He completed his residency in internal medicine and a clinical fellowship in nephrology at the University of North Carolina before undertaking a research fellowship in pediatric nephrology at the University of Minnesota Hospitals in Minneapolis, Minnesota.

== Career ==
Falk has served in various capacities for the American Society of Nephrology, including post-graduate education, finance, and nomination committees, as well as Training Program Director. He was elected to the ASN Council in 2006 and served as President of the ASN from 2011-12. During his leadership, he signed a Memorandum of Understanding with Margaret Hamburg, Commissioner of the Food and Drug Administration (FDA), that formed the Kidney Health Initiative (KHI). KHI is a public-private partnership between the ASN and the FDA to help foster the development of new products that will improve the lives of people living with kidney disease. KHI works closely with the FDA Center for Devices and Radiological Health, Center for Drug Evaluation and Research, Center for Biologics Evaluation and Research, and the Center for Food Safety and Applied Nutrition. Falk continues to serve on the KHI Board of Directors.

In 2012, Falk and Tod Ibrahim co-founded the ASN Foundation for Kidney Research (now known as KidneyCure) and raised $14 million for the foundation in its inaugural year. The ASN Foundation for Kidney Research Grants Program includes the Student Scholars Grant Program, the Ben J. Lipps Research Fellowship Program, and the Career Development Grants Program.

Falk has served in various positions within National Institutes of Health (NIH) study sections, review and special emphasis panels, and advisory boards since 1997. He also serves as a member of editorial boards, including those for the Journal of the American Society of Nephrology, Kidney International, and the American College of Physicians' MKSAP series.

For more than 25 years, Falk has been an author and editor for UpToDate, Inc., a company in the Wolters Kluwer Health division of Wolters Kluwer. UpToDate started by specializing in nephrology and have since added over twenty other specialties, with more in development.

In 1999, Falk founded the UNC Renal Epidemiology Training Program that was continuously funded through a National Institutes of Health Ruth L. Kirschstein National Research Service Award (NRSA) until 2023. The training program is currently supported by the NIH as a U2C/TL1 grant as the North Carolina Kidney, Urology, Hematology Training, Research, Innovation, and Outreach (NC KUH TRIO) Program. The NC KUH TRIO brings together three esteemed academic medical centers in North Carolina--the University of North Carolina-Chapel Hill, Duke University, and Wake Forest University--unified by their world-class research and mentoring expertise in kidney, urologic, and hematologic (KUH) specialties. TRIO fosters an environment where dedicated KUH researchers and mentors drive scholarly learning, cultivate professional networks, and facilitate career development. This partnership aims to implement high-impact practices and create guided pathways for learning.

Following his appointment as Chair of the UNC Department of Medicine, Falk established the Physician Scientist Training Program (PSTP).The program was established to recruit and train young physicians interested in pursuing academic careers in medical research. The program allows candidates with significant research experience (PhD, MPH, or equivalent research background) to complete Internal Medicine residency, fellowship, and postdoctoral research training via the American Board of Internal Medicine Research Pathway.

== Research ==
Falk is a preeminent authority in glomerular disease and vasculitis. His clinical practice is deeply intertwined with his research, where he investigates the intricate cellular, tissue, and physiologic changes that underpin autoimmune kidney diseases. He is dedicated to advancing the understanding of innate and adaptive immunity, inflammation and fundamental neutrophil/monocyte biology. He has conducted seminal research on the pathogenesis of ANCA-associated vasculitides that affect small to medium-sized blood vessels. Falk studies kidney diseases caused by anti-neutrophil cytoplasmic autoantibodies, which are a major cause for the most common forms of aggressive glomerulonephritis and systemic vasculitis in adults. ANCA are formed against antigens in the cytoplasm of neutrophil granulocytes (the most common type of white blood cell) and monocytes. Clinical lab tests for ANCA are now common worldwide.

Falk and his colleague J. Charles Jennette authored a landmark 1988 article in the New England Journal of Medicine reporting the discovery of a new class of autoantibodies called myeloperoxidase-specific antineutrophil cytoplasmic autoantibodies (MPO-ANCAs) that cause the most common form of aggressive immune-mediated inflammatory kidney disease.

In the early 1990s, further investigations by Falk and his collaborators revealed that ANCA could actually cause disease. In 1990, his paper in the Proceedings of the National Academy of Sciences first suggested that ANCAs could be pathogenic and described how ANCAs cause substantial injury to endothelial cells that line small blood vessels.

In 1994, Falk and Jennette convened an International Consensus Conference that yielded the Chapel Hill Nomenclature for Small Vessel Vasculitis, which has now been adopted on a worldwide basis. The goals of this conference were to reach consensus on names for the most common forms of vasculitis and construct a specific definition for each. Because of advances in the understanding of vasculitis, nearly two decades later, clinicians and scientists from numerous disciplines were invited to Chapel Hill to revisit the nomenclature and participate in the 15th International Vasculitis & ANCA Workshop. A revised nomenclature for vasculitides was adopted that was considered more relevant and more valuable.

Over the ensuing decade, Falk and his colleagues have more fully documented the pathogenicity of ANCA. In 2002, they demonstrated in a mouse model that passively transferred anti-myeloperoxidase antibodies were capable of inducing pauci-immune necrotizing and crescentic glomerulonephritis. In their research article published in Nature Medicine in 2004, Falk and colleagues proposed a new theory of autoimmunity, called the "theory of autoantigen complementarity," based on the observation from human studies that patients reacted with complementary peptides to proteinase 3 (PR3) as well as the initial sense peptide. This theory has spawned a series of new observations that investigators are reporting in the literature.

The Falk lab identified HLA-DB1*15 as a genetic trait that is a risk factor PR3-ANCA disease in African American patients with an odds ratio of 73.3 (p=2.3x10-9). They found that a disproportionate number of African American patients carried the DRB1*1501 allele of Caucasian descent, rather than the DRB1*1503 allele of African descent. The DRB1*1501 allele was also significant in Caucasian patients with an odds ratio of 2.2 (p=0.007). In a validation study, supported by the Vasculitis Clinical Research Consortium (VCRC), seven out of nine African American PR3-ANCA patients carried a DRB1*15 allele giving an overall odds ratio of 35.9 (p=3.0x10-11) that this allele is a risk factor for this group.

In collaboration with genetic experts at UNC, Falk and his colleagues determined that ANCA autoantigen genes are activated or silenced through epigenetic control, that is, by factors that regulate gene expression without altering the underlying DNA sequence. These observations have a broader impact on numerous autoantibody-mediated diseases. Falk's seminal work published in the 1988 article in the New England Journal of Medicine described the discovery that ANCA vasculitis is an autoimmune disease with increased expression of the autoantigen genes, myeloperoxidase (MPO) and proteinase 3 (PRTN3). To clarify this, in 2020 Falk and colleagues measured MPO and PRTN3 messenger RNA in monocytes, normal-density neutrophils, and in enriched leukocytes from peripheral blood mononuclear cells. Increased autoantigen gene expression was detected in normal-density neutrophils and enriched leukocytes from patients during active disease as compared to those from healthy individuals. In contrast, normal-density neutrophils were activated by MPO-ANCA and monoclonal anti-PR3 antibody. Normal-density neutrophil activation correlated with MPO and PRTN3 mRNA. Increased autoantigen gene expression originating from the mature low-density and normal-density neutrophils suggests transcriptional dysregulation is a hallmark of ANCA vasculitis. The correlation between autoantigen gene expression and antibody-mediated normal-density neutrophil activation links gene expression to disease pathogenesis.

Treatment of autoimmune diseases has relied on broad immunosuppression. Knowledge of specific interactions between human leukocyte antigen (HLA), the autoantigen, and effector immune cells, provides the foundation for antigen-specific therapies. A study by Falk and colleagues published in 2020 investigated the role of HLA, specific MPO epitopes, CD4^{+} T cells, and ANCA specificity in shaping the immune response in patients with ANCA vasculitis. A restricted region of MPO that was recognized by both CD4^{+} T cells and ANCA was identified. This restricted MPO region was targeted by both T cells and antibodies but is not accessible to solvent or chemical modification, indicating that these epitopes are buried. These observations reveal interactions between restricted MPO epitopes and the adaptive immune system within ANCA vasculitis that may inform new antigen-specific therapies in autoimmune disease while providing insight into immunopathogenesis.

Falk and colleagues continue to conduct innovative research that bridges fundamental science with clinical insights into the immune mechanisms driving glomerular and vascular injury. Their work has deepened the understanding of complex immune processes involved in these diseases and paved the way for the discovery of novel biomarkers that could revolutionize revolutionize diagnosis and treatment. In 2020, Falk and colleagues were awarded an NIH-funded research grant, "Pathobiology of ANCA Glomerulonephritis: Targeting Adaptive and Innate Immune Processes for Precision Therapies." The lack of targeted immune therapy leaves patients with an overly handicapped immune system and a host of toxic side effects. This research seeks to advance the field toward more precise and targeted therapies with far less potential for harm.

== Glomerular Disease Collaborative Network ==
In 1985, Falk and Jennette formed the Glomerular Disease Collaborative Network (GDCN) to coordinate kidney disease research by nephrologists throughout the southeastern United States and connect them with the UNC School of Medicine. The GDCN, which consists of over 300 participating clinics and academic sites in the southeastern United States and beyond, seeks to learn more about how glomerular diseases arise and progress, and ultimately to find the most effective treatment for patients with these diseases. The GDCN has established collaborations and executed consortium agreements with other institutions, industry, and foundations. These relationships have resulted in transformative science. Key to the GDCN is its ongoing enrollment and follow-up of patients in 16 specific glomerular disease registries. The registries allow nephrologists to identify patients at the onset of their disease and follow the course of their disease throughout their lifetime. Continual update of patients' medical records and contact information for the registries allows the GDCN to recruit patients for participation in a variety of more focused studies that may include the collection of blood and urine or the completion of questionnaires or telephone interviews. The registry is also used as a recruiting mechanism for treatment studies. The GDCN has initiated or participated in numerous single-center and multicenter clinical trials, epidemiologic studies, and a wide range of basic science and translational research projects. These projects have been possible through recruitment from its 16 glomerular disease patient cohorts. The success of the GDCN helped lay the groundwork for UNC's involvement as a participating clinical center (PCC) in the CureGN Network. As Principal Investigator for the UNC PCC, Falk is responsible for ensuring robust enrollment, long-term retention and the collection of high quality clinical data and biological specimens among eight clinical sub-sites, including UNC. The GDCN has proven instrumental in advancing foundational research, facilitating clinical trials, and generating critical pathological insights. It has culminated in the National Institute of Diabetes and Digestive and Kidney Diseases (NIDDK)-funded national "GDCN Clinical Center--Advancing Clinical Research in Primary Glomerular Diseases."

== Kidney Education Outreach Program (KEOP) ==
Falk organized and continues to conduct a weekly Vasculitis and Connective Tissue Diseases outpatient clinic that is one of the largest in the United States. In 2005, Falk became co-founder and director of the UNC Kidney Center (UNCKC). The overall mission of the UNCKC is to reduce the burden of chronic kidney disease through discovery about the pathophysiology and therapeutics of the disease; through the development and assessment of educational programs about kidney disease for North Carolinians and their primary care physicians and by providing physicians and citizens access to information about the causes and treatments of kidney disease. The UNCKC provides a multidisciplinary and multi-school approach to research pertaining to kidney disease spanning the gamut from basic molecular biology and genetics to broad epidemiological studies and clinical treatment trials.

Through the Kidney Education Outreach Program (KEOP), Falk launched a patient education outreach campaign in 2006 with the slogan, "Remember to ask: 'Hey Doc, how are my kidneys?'" Targeted education initiatives include billboard and television media campaigns and community-based interactive information sessions. Through the KEOP, the Mobile Outreach Unit has educated and screened almost 6,000 North Carolina citizens in 45 of its 100 counties.

In 2008, the UNCKC received a generous donation from Shirley Gilman to create the Allan Brewster Memorial Fund. This fund has been used to expand the KEOP's community-based awareness campaign to increase North Carolinians' knowledge about the importance of organ donation and the role of kidney transplantation in achieving improved clinical outcomes and quality of life for persons at risk for or experiencing kidney failure. In 2011, UNC opened kidney pre-transplant satellite clinics in the western (Asheville) and eastern (Raleigh/Rex) areas of the state. These clinics include a full transplant evaluation by one of UNC's transplant nephrologists. A nurse practitioner provides education on living donation, pre-emptive transplantation, and the importance of managing comorbidities to optimize transplant outcomes. The overall goal of the kidney transplant program is to ensure that every patient interested in a kidney transplant is evaluated and listed.

== Awards and honors ==
Falk was honored with the first Nan and Hugh Cullman Eminent Professorship in 2016.

In July 1994, Falk was appointed the Doc J. Thurston Distinguished Professor and was honored as the first Allen Brewster Distinguished Professor of Medicine in 2011. He has been recognized as one of the "Best Doctors in America" every year since 1992 and is the recipient of a number of invited lectureships, including the prestigious Norma Berryhill Distinguished Lecture in 2011, on "The Essential Need for a Climate of Creativity in Academic Hospitals: The ANCA Vasculitis Story." Falk was inducted into the American Society of Clinical Investigation in 1993 and into the American Clinical and Climatologic Association in 2000, when he also received their Theodore E. Woodward Award. He was president of the American Society of Nephrology in 2012. In 2015, he earned National Institutes of Health honors for seminal work as a physician-scientist and delivered the National Institutes of Health Astute Clinician Lecture in 2016. Falk was honored by the New York Academy of Medicine in 2016 with the Edward N. Gibbs Lecture and Award in Nephrology, a lifetime achievement award. In 2017, Falk received the American Society of Nephrology John P. Peters Award in recognition of sustained research contributions to the discipline of nephrology, and his sustained achievements in one or more domains of academic medicine including clinical care, education, and leadership.
