= Current Allergy and Asthma Reports =

- Discipline: Allergy, immunology
- Language: English
- Edited by: David Peden

Publication details
- History: 2001–present
- Publisher: Springer Science+Business Media
- Frequency: Bimonthly
- Impact factor: 2.765 (2014)

Standard abbreviations
- ISO 4: Curr. Allergy Asthma Rep.

Indexing
- ISSN: 1529-7322 (print); 1534-6315 (web)
- LCCN: 00214733
- OCLC no.: 43854820

Links
- Journal homepage; Online archive

Current Allergy and Asthma Reports is a bimonthly peer-reviewed medical journal publishing review articles pertaining to allergy and asthma. It was established in 2001 and is published by Springer Science+Business Media. The editor-in-chief is David Peden (University of North Carolina at Chapel Hill School of Medicine). According to the Journal Citation Reports, the journal has a 2014 impact factor of 2.765.
