= Sharon Anderson =

Sharon Anderson may refer to:

- Sharon Anderson (nephrologist) (born 1949), American physician
- Sharon Anderson (singer), Canadian singer

== See also ==
- Sharon Anderson-Gold (1947–2011), professor in the areas of ethics and philosophy
