= North Carolina Area Health Education Centers Program =

The North Carolina Area Health Education Centers Program provides the central leadership and support for all of the regional NC Area Health Education Centers (AHECs). It is located on the campus of the University of North Carolina School of Medicine in Chapel Hill, NC.

== Mission ==
The mission of the North Carolina AHEC Program is to meet the state’s health and health workforce needs by providing educational programs in partnership with academic institutions, health care agencies, and other organizations committed to improving the health of the people of North Carolina.

The educational programs and information services are targeted toward:

- Improving the distribution and retention of healthcare providers, with a special emphasis on primary care and prevention.
- Improving the diversity and cultural competence of the health care workforce in all health disciplines.
- Enhancing the quality of care and improving health care outcomes.
- Addressing the health care needs of underserved communities and populations.

== History ==
The North Carolina AHEC Program evolved from national and state concerns with the supply, distribution, retention and quality of health professionals. In 1970, a report from the Carnegie Commission recommended the development of a nationwide system of Area Health Education Centers.

Legislation and federal support since the early 1970s has made the implementation of AHEC programs possible in many states. This national focus coincided with a growing effort in North Carolina to establish statewide community training for health professionals and reverse a trend toward shortages and uneven distribution of primary care physicians in the state's rural areas.

The program began in 1972 with three AHEC regions under a federal AHEC contract with the UNC-CH School of Medicine. In 1974, the North Carolina General Assembly approved and funded a plan by the UNC-CH School of Medicine to create a statewide network of nine AHEC regions. The plan called for the establishment of 300 new primary care medical residencies and the regular rotation of students to off-campus sites.

The General Assembly also provided funds to build or renovate AHEC educational facilities in the nine regions and to develop the proposed program components. By 1975, nine AHECs were operational.

In 2018, Hugh Tilson, Jr was named as Director of the North Carolina Health Education Centers.

NC AHEC, in partnership with the North Carolina Department of Justice, launched a program in 2025 to expand training for Sexual Assault Nurse Examiners (SANEs) across the state. Funded through the federal Sexual Assault Kit Initiative (SAKI), the program aims to train 50 nurses to provide specialized medical and forensic care to survivors of sexual assault, with a focus on improving access in rural and underserved areas.

== Regional Centers ==
- Area L
- Charlotte
- Eastern
- Piedmont
- MAHEC
- Northwest
- South East
- Southern Regional
- Duke
- Wake

== See also ==
- The National AHEC Program
