= Burton Rose =

American nephrologist (1942–2020)

- Born: November 19, 1942; Brooklyn, New York, U.S.
- Died: April 24, 2020 (aged 77); Wellesley, Massachusetts, U.S.
- Known for: Creator of UpToDate software, author of Clinical Physiology of Acid-Base and Electrolyte Disorders
- Spouse: Gloria
- Awards: Robert G. Narins Award (American Society of Nephrology)
- Scientific career
- Fields: Nephrology
- Institutions: Harvard School of Medicine

Burton "Bud" David Rose (November 19, 1942 – April 24, 2020) was an American nephrologist and the creator of UpToDate, an online medical resource.

== Career ==
Burton Rose was a clinical professor of medicine at Harvard University. He also held positions at the University of Massachusetts Medical School, Brigham and Women's Hospital, and Beth Israel Deaconess Medical Center. He was the author of Clinical Physiology of Acid-Base and Electrolyte Disorders and Pathophysiology of Renal Disease; and the co-author of Renal Pathophysiology: The Essentials.

In 1987, Dr. Rose initiated a novel program at Brigham and Women's Hospital, the Continuing Education and Referral Service. This included three main components: 1) A free 800-hotline whereby community physicians throughout New England could call for quick answers to questions that came up in general practice; 2) An Advanced Clinical Training program through which community physicians could come to Brigham and Women's for brief (1-3 days) focused training in an area of interest; and 3) A monthly topical newsletter for community physicians, called "Medical Update", that was authored by expert clinician/scientists at Brigham and Women's.

Rose created the first version of UpToDate, in his house in 1992. It was released on floppy disks. In October 2017, more than 1.3 million clinicians in 187 countries have consulted UpToDate's website and mobile apps, with viewings of more than 32 million topics per month.

In 2019, the American Society of Nephrology announced the "Burton D. Rose, MD, Endowed Lectureship".

== Death ==
Rose, who had Alzheimer's disease, died from complications from COVID-19 on April 24, 2020, during the COVID-19 pandemic in Massachusetts.
