= UpToDate =

Medical software company

UpToDate, Inc. is a company within the Health division of Wolters Kluwer that develops UpToDate, a point-of-care medical software system.

The system consists of an evidence-based clinical database containing medical and patient information, Lexidrug drug monographs, drug interaction tools, and medical calculators. Content is written by more than 7,600 physician authors, editors, and peer reviewers. It is accessible online and offline via personal computers or mobile devices, and requires a subscription.

The company was founded in 1992 by Burton Rose and Joseph Rush. The service initially covered nephrology and has since added more than 20 other medical specialties.

UpToDate articles undergo anonymous peer review, and the platform requires contributors to disclose conflicts of interest. A 2014 study published in the Journal of Medical Ethics evaluated six entries from UpToDate and DynaMed, focusing on medical conditions with contested management strategies or those primarily treated with brand-name drugs. The authors found that all six examined UpToDate topics involved contributors with financial ties to the manufacturers of drugs mentioned in those entries, such as consulting roles, research grants, or speaking fees. None of the DynaMed entries evaluated contained contributors with a conflict of interest.

== Access ==
Full access to the service requires a subscription, which costs US$579 annually for a U.S. physician as of 2026. Through the Norwegian Electronic Health Library, people in Norway have free access to BMJ Best Practice, UpToDate (via registered employers or educational institutions), and the drug database Micromedex. UpToDate was made available for free in New Zealand after the 2011 Christchurch earthquake, in Haiti after the 2010 earthquake, and in Nepal after the April 2015 earthquake. The Global Health Delivery Project at Harvard University administers access to UpToDate for those who offer medical care to poor or underserved populations outside the United States.

Better Evidence by Ariadne Labs provides health professionals from less developed countries full access for free. One study found that UpToDate was used by 1,017 U.S. hospitals between 2004 and 2006.

== See also ==
- BMJ Best Practice
- Dynamed
- eMedicine
