= Christopher W. Lentz =

United States Air Force general

Christopher W. Lentz is a brigadier general in the United States Air Force.

== Career ==
Lentz was commissioned in 1983 and graduated from Wayne State University the following year. In 1985, he attended the School of Aerospace Medicine at Brooks Air Force Base and later held two clerkships at Wilford Hall Medical Center. Lentz received his Doctorate of Medicine from the Wayne State University School of Medicine in 1988. He later became a Fellow at the University of Texas Medical Branch and the UNC School of Medicine and a Resident at the Medical College of Wisconsin.

From 1996 to 1999, Lentz was assigned to the 59th Medical Wing at Wilford Hall Medical Center. He was later stationed at the Headquarters of Air Mobility Command from 2003 to 2008. Lentz was a Critical Care Air Transport Team director at Ramstein Air Base from 2010 to 2011 before being assigned to The Pentagon in 2012. He returned to Air Mobility Command the following year. In 2016, Lentze was assigned to the Air Force Headquarters.

Awards he has received include the Meritorious Service Medal with four oak leaf clusters, the Air Force Commendation Medal, the Air Force Achievement Medal, the National Defense Service Medal, the Global War on Terrorism Service Medal, the Air Force Expeditionary Service Ribbon with oak leaf cluster, the Air Force Longevity Service Award with three oak leaf clusters, the Armed Forces Reserve Medal with silver hourglass device and 'M' device, the Air Force Training Ribbon with oak leaf cluster, the Air Force Outstanding Unit Award with two oak leaf clusters and the Air Force Organizational Excellence Award with three oak leaf clusters.

== Education ==
- Wayne State University
- School of Aerospace Medicine
- Wayne State University School of Medicine
- University of Texas Medical Branch
- Medical College of Wisconsin
- UNC School of Medicine
- Air War College
- University of Cincinnati
- National War College
- Uniformed Services University of the Health Sciences
- Capstone Military Leadership Program
