= EMedicine =

Online clinical medical knowledge base

eMedicine is an online clinical medical knowledge base founded in 1996 by Dr. Scott Plantz, with Julie Bohlen, Vern Powers, Jonathan Adler and computer engineers Joanne Berezin and Jeffrey Berezin. The eMedicine website consists of approximately 6,800 medical topic review articles, each of which is associated with a clinical subspecialty "textbook". The knowledge base includes over 25,000 clinically multimedia files.

Each article is authored by board certified specialists in the subspecialty to which the article belongs and undergoes three levels of physician peer-review, plus review by a Doctor of Pharmacy. The article's authors are identified with their current faculty appointments. Each article is updated yearly, or more frequently as changes in practice occur, and the date is published on the article. eMedicine.com was sold to WebMD in January, 2006 and is available as the Medscape Reference.

== History ==
Plantz, Adler and Berezin evolved the concept for eMedicine.com in 1996 and deployed the initial site via Boston Medical Publishing, Inc., a corporation in which Plantz and Adler were principals. A Group Publishing System 1 (GPS 1) was developed that allowed large numbers of contributors to collaborate simultaneously. That system was first used to create a knowledge base in emergency medicine with 600 contributing MDs creating over 630 chapters in just over a year. In 1997 eMedicine.com, Inc. was legally spun off from Boston Medical Publishing. eMedicine attracted angel-level investment from Tenet Healthcare in 1999 and a significant VC investment in 2000 (Omnicom Group, HIG Capital).

Several years were spent creating the tables of contents, recruiting expert physicians and in the creation of the additional 6,100+ medical and surgical articles. The majority of operations were based out of the Omaha, Nebraska, office.

In the early 2000s Plantz and Lorenzo also spearheaded an alliance with the University of Nebraska Medical Center to accredit eMedicine content for physician, nursing, and pharmacy continuing education.

In 2005, eMedicine entered into discussions for acquisition. The board of directors unanimously recommended approval for sale of the company to WebMD. The sale was completed in January 2006.

The site is free to use, requiring only registration. eMedicine content could also be accessed as an e-book, and could be downloaded into a palm top device.

=== StatPearls ===
In 2018, the founders of eMedicine began StatPearls, an international collaboration to improve medical education, with stated goal of creating a free, comprehensive, online medical educational database and providing medical workers with affordable continuing medical education credits.

== Usage among specialists ==
In 2012 Volsky et al. evaluated the most frequently used internet information sources by the public, (1) identifying the three most frequently referenced Internet sources; (2) comparing the content accuracy of each of the three sources and (3) ascertaining user-friendliness of each site; and (4) informing practitioners and patients of the quality of available information. They found Wikipedia, eMedicine, and MedlinePlus (United States National Library of Medicine (NLM)/National Institutes of Health (NIH) were the most referenced sources. For content accuracy, eMedicine scored highest (84%; p<0.05) over MedlinePlus (49%) and Wikipedia (46%). The highest incidence of errors and omissions per article was found in Wikipedia (0.98±0.19), twice more than eMedicine (0.42±0.19; p<0.05). Errors were similar between MedlinePlus and both eMedicine and Wikipedia. On ratings for user interface, which incorporated Flesch-Kincaid Reading Level and Flesch Reading Ease, MedlinePlus was the most user-friendly (4.3±0.29). This was nearly twice that of eMedicine (2.4±0.26) and slightly greater than Wikipedia (3.7±0.3). All differences were significant (p<0.05). There were seven topics for which articles were not available on MedlinePlus. They concluded "Knowledge of the quality of available information on the Internet improves pediatric otolaryngologists' ability to counsel parents. The top web search results for pediatric otolaryngology diagnoses are Wikipedia, MedlinePlus, and eMedicine. Online information varies in quality, with a 46–84% concordance with current textbooks. eMedicine has the most accurate, comprehensive content and fewest errors, but is more challenging to read and navigate. Both Wikipedia and MedlinePlus have lower content accuracy and more errors; however, MedlinePlus is simplest of all to read, at a 9th grade level.

Significantly for eMedicine, Laraway and Rogers used PubMed, Medline Medical Journals.com and eMedicine as primary sources of information. This is significant because Medline is the compendium of all NIH-sponsored research. eMedicine is made up of articles translating the body of current research in Medline into clinical practice guidelines from the perspective of each subspeciality.

Cao, Liu, Simpson, et al revealed that Medline and eMedicine were used as primary resources in developing the online system AskHERMES. Physicians were asked to solve complex clinical problems using three different sources of information: AskHermes, Google and UpToDate. Surveys of the physicians who used all three systems were asked to score the three systems by ease of use, quality of answer, time spent, and overall performance.

A 2009 study showed that "89.1% of ophthalmologist respondents accessed peer-reviewed material online, including Emedicine (60.2%)."

A 2007 study showed that 12% of radiology residents used eMedicine as their first source when doing research on the Internet.

A 2005 study ranking 114 sites rated it the second-highest Internet-based source of information for pediatric neuro-oncology, after the site of the National Cancer Institute.

A 2002 study described the site's coverage of dermatology as "excellent and comprehensive."

In 2000 an article in the Journal of Ear Nose and Throat by AD Meyers from the University of Colorado School of Medicine, Denver, Colorado, announced the unveiling of the ENT textbook online at emedicine.com.
