= Barbara Murphy (immunologist) =

Irish nephrologist (1964–2021)

Barbara Therese Murphy (15 October 1964 – 30 June 2021) was an Irish nephrologist known for her research in the immunology of kidney transplantation. She was the first female chair of a Department of Medicine at an academic medical center in New York City.

== Life ==
Murphy was born on 15 October 1964 in Dublin, Ireland. Her father owned an airfreight company. Murphy attended medical school at the Royal College of Surgeons in Dublin. She became interested in nephrology, and completed a residency and nephrology fellowship at Beaumont Hospital, which she followed with another nephrology fellowship at Brigham and Women’s Hospital in Boston. There she worked with Charles Carpenter and Mohammed Sayegh. She developed a particular interest in predicting the outcomes of kidney transplantations, using genomics and genetics. Murphy joined Mount Sinai in 1997, being appointed as the director of transplant nephrology. Murphy was appointed Chair of Medicine in 2012.

Murphy was the chairwoman of the department of medicine at the Icahn School of Medicine at Mount Sinai. She was the first female chair of a Department of Medicine at an academic medical center in New York City. She was an editor on a number of journals, including Clinical Journal of the American Society of Nephrology, and the American Journal of Kidney Diseases.

== Awards ==
In 2003 Murphy was awarded the Young Investigator Award in Basic Science by the American Society of Transplantation. The American Kidney Fund awarded her nephrologist of the year in 2011. She was president-elect of the American Society of Nephrology in 2021. She was also the recipient of the ASN’s first Lifetime Achievement Award, in 2021.

Murphy died aged 56 on 30 June 2021 from glioblastoma, survived by her husband and son.
