= BMJ Best Practice =

Online medical decision-support tool

BMJ Best Practice is an online decision-support tool made for clinical decision making support. It was created in 2009 by BMJ.

== Development ==
BMJ launched Best Practice in 2009.

== Access ==
BMJ offers personal and institutional subscriptions. Only institutional subscriptions are available to purchase in the United States and Canada. All institutional subscriptions include onsite and remote access as well as access to the mobile app for iOS and Android devices. It is also included in the Clinical Information Access Portal of the New South Wales Ministry of Health.

== Reception ==
In a 2016 article published in the Journal of Medical Internet Research, BMJ Best Practice received maximum scores for strength of volume, editorial quality, and evidence-based methodology.

== See also ==
- UpToDate
- DynaMed
- BMJ
