= Bruce Molitoris =

Bruce Molitoris, MD, FASN, is a past President (2012–2013) of the American Society of Nephrology (ASN). He is Professor of Medicine, Director of Nephrology and Director of the Indiana Center for Biological Microscopy at Indiana University.

== Education and professional activities ==
Molitoris received his MD from Washington University School of Medicine in St. Louis, Missouri, and then had his residency and a fellowship at the University of Colorado School of Medicine in Denver, Colorado. He was a member of the faculty at the University of Colorado (1983—1993 when he moved to Indiana to become Director of Nephrology.

He is a member of the ASN Council and has served on the Training Program Directors Committee, the ASN Week Program committee, the Nominating Committee, and served as chairperson of the AKI Advisory Board. He has beena member in numerous NIH committees, NIH study sections and National Kidney Foundation committees including the National Scientific Advisory Board.

== Research ==
His research has centered on the cell biology of acute kidney injury with an emphasis on proximal tubule cell injury secondary to ischemia and/or nephrotoxins. He also focuses on the use of 2-photon microscopy in live animals to understand the normal physiology, disease pathophysiology and therapeutic responses. He is a founding member of two Biotech LLCs dealing with 2-Photon and fluorescent technology.

Molitoris is the author of more than 200 scientific papers in scientific journals and has served as the editor or co-editor of several books, including Acute Renal Failure, a companion to The Kidney.
