= National AHEC Organization =

USA professional association of AHECs

The National AHEC Organization (NAO) is the professional association of Area Health Education Centers (AHECs) in the United States. AHECs are regional organizations associated with The National AHEC Program. AHECs work in designated regions through community and academic partnerships to advance the availability of health care and health care education, focusing on rural and medically underserved areas. According to the NAO, approximately 120 medical schools and 600 nursing and allied health schools work with the AHEC system. AHECs affiliated with the NAO collaborate to educate, share resources, and strengthen local and national partnerships.

== Membership ==
Within each state, AHECs are coordinated by one or more central program offices. "In 2009, 54 AHEC programs with more than 200 centers operated in 48 states in the U.S." [and in the District of Columbia]. Of these, 51 AHEC program offices and 192 regional AHECs were members of the NAO.

== Origin of AHECs ==
Development of the AHEC system began when the first programs were funded by Congress in 1971 as a national strategy to improve the supply, distribution, retention, and quality of primary care and other health practitioners in medically underserved areas. The program originated in response to a 1970 report by the Carnegie Foundation for the Advancement of Teaching, Higher Education and the Nation’s Health: Policies for Medical and Dental Education, which expressed concern with healthcare availability and delivery in the United States. In this landmark report, the Carnegie Commission noted a significant healthcare workforce shortage and urgently recommended immediate “restructuring of the education of health manpower” to increase by fifty percent over the following decade the number of centers that train physicians. The commission's broad recommendations also included workforce development of nursing, pharmacy, and allied health professions. AHECs receive some of their funding by a grant from the U.S. Department of Health and Human Resources through the Bureau of Health Professions.

== The Work of NAO ==
The NAO organizes its work around the core goals of its AHEC constituents:

- Recruitment of youth to health careers and assistance in their preparation
- Training of health professions students
- Support of health professionals
- Health and community development

The work of the NAO is achieved through ten standing committees and additional ad hoc committees. An editorial committee oversees the content and quarterly publication of the Journal of the National AHEC Organization (formerly the National AHEC Bulletin). The NAO holds a policy conference each spring and fall, as well as a biannual national meeting in alternating summers.

== Sources ==
- Bacon TJ, Baden DJ, Coccodrilli LD (2000). The National Area Health Education Center program and primary care residency training. J Rural Health. Summer 2000; 16(3) 288–94
- Blossom, HJ (2009). Viewpoint: AHECs: A National Tool for Maldistribution. Retrieved February 1, 2010 from http://www.aamc.org/newsroom/reporter/dec09/viewpoint.htm
- Bureau of Health Professions, 2005. Evaluating the Impact of Title VII, Section 747 Programs, 5th Annual Report to the Secretary of the U.S. Department of Health and Human Services and to Congress. Retrieved on February 1, 2010, from http://bhpr.hrsa.gov/medicine-dentistry/actpcmd/reports/fifthreport/3.htm
- Carnegie Commission (1970). Higher Education and the Nation's Health: Policies for Medical and Dental Education, A Special Report and Recommendations, McGraw-Hill Book Company, ISBN 0-07-010021-7
- Gessert C and Smith D (1981). “The National AHEC Program: Review of Its Progress and Considerations for the 1980s," Public Health Rep. 96(2)
