= Sharon Anderson (nephrologist) =

American physician (born 1949)

- Born: 1949 (age 76–77)
- Occupation: Nephrologist
- Known for: Former President of the American Society of Nephrology (ASN)

Sharon A. Anderson (born 1949) is an American physician, educator, and researcher practicing in Portland, Oregon. She has contributed extensively to the study of the progression of chronic kidney disease. Her research has focused on diabetic nephropathy, polycystic kidney disease and the pathophysiology of the aging kidney. She was the first woman to serve as President of the American Society of Nephrology (ASN). She was the Chief of the Department of Medicine at the Veteran's Affairs Medical Center in Portland and is currently the Chair of the Department of Medicine at Oregon Health and Science University (OHSU). She has been appointed to the National Institutes of Health Council of Councils. Her publications as author or co-author number greater than 150.

== Biography and training ==
Sharon Anderson was born in 1949. She earned a Bachelor of Arts from the University of Maryland in 1971 and her medical degree from the Louisiana State University School of Medicine in 1979. As part of her post-graduate training, she completed an internship in 1979 and residency in 1983 at the University of Oregon Health Sciences Center, which would later become OHSU. She subsequently completed a one-year fellowship in nephrology at Beth Israel Hospital and Harvard Medical School in 1983 and then a two-year research fellowship in nephrology at Brigham and Women's Hospital and Harvard Medical School. She is a Fellow of the American Society of Nephrology (FASN). She currently lives with her husband Edmund T. Curtis in Portland, Oregon.

== Research and career ==
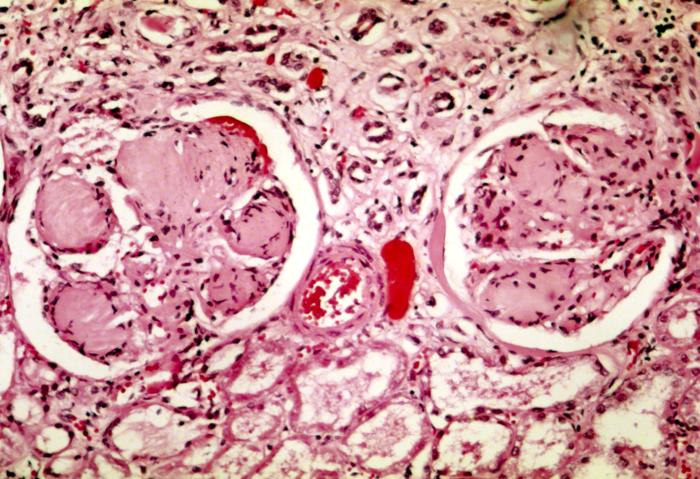
Nodular glomerulosclerosis characteristic of diabetic nephropathy (Source: CDC)

In her career as a researcher, she has expanded understanding of the pathophysiology of diabetic nephropathy, which has, in turn, changed the practice patterns for treatment of the disease. Her work uncovered the important effect of ACE inhibitors in modifying the progression of diabetic nephropathy. Her studies provided support for initiating large scale clinical trials, which have resulted in improvements in patient care. This has contributed to lower predicted numbers of patient who will require dialysis due to end-stage kidney disease.

== Work for the American Society of Nephrology and NIH ==
She has served in leadership roles for the American Society in Nephrology in a number of capacities. Her committee appointments with the ASN include terms of service on the Abstract Selection Committee, the Program Committee, the Chronic Kidney Disease Advisory Group, and the Executive Committee for Training Program Directors. In 2004, she was elected to the council of the ASN. She has also served on the Editorial Board of the Journal of the American Society of Nephrology (JASN). She was the first woman to serve as President of the American Society of Nephrology in its 43-year history. Her term started in 2009 and she played an activist role in the position. She has worked to strategically improve the diversity of leadership at the ASN, to better reflect social demographics.

In her work with the American Board of Internal Medicine (ABIM), she served as Chair of the Nephrology Board. For the NIH, she chaired the General Medicine "B" Study Section.

== Awards and honors ==
For her work as an educator at OHSU, she was awarded Faculty Teaching Awards 2001, 2002, and 2003. She was also awarded the 2003 Medical Staff Chairman's Award for Outstanding Service to Medical Staff. Other awards include a Faculty Senate Award for Outstanding Service, from OHSU in 2006. Other leadership positions include service as a Fellow of the Executive Leadership in Academic Medicine. In addition, she serves on the council of the American Heart Association to oversee a division on Kidney in Cardiovascular Disease and High Blood Pressure Research. She is a member of multiple other professional societies.
