= Clinical Journal of the American Society of Nephrology =

- Discipline: Nephrology
- Language: English
- Edited by: Rajnish Mehrotra

Publication details
- History: 2006-present
- Publisher: American Society of Nephrology
- Frequency: Monthly
- Impact factor: 8.237 (2020)

Standard abbreviations
- ISO 4: Clin. J. Am. Soc. Nephrol.

Indexing
- ISSN: 1555-9041 (print); 1555-905X (web)
- LCCN: 2005214803
- OCLC no.: 60194474

Links
- Journal homepage; Online access; Online archive

The Clinical Journal of the American Society of Nephrology is a monthly peer-reviewed medical journal covering nephrology. It was established in 2006 and is published by the American Society of Nephrology. The editor-in-chief is Rajnish Mehrotra (University of Washington). According to the Journal Citation Reports, the journal has a 2020 impact factor of 8.237, ranking it 4th out of 80 journals in the category "Urology & Nephrology".

== Abstracting and indexing ==
The journal is abstracted and indexed in the following databases:

- CINAHL
- Current Contents/Clinical Medicine
- MEDLINE
- Science Citation Index
- Scopus
