= EBSCO Information Services =

American distributor of digital media, founded 1984

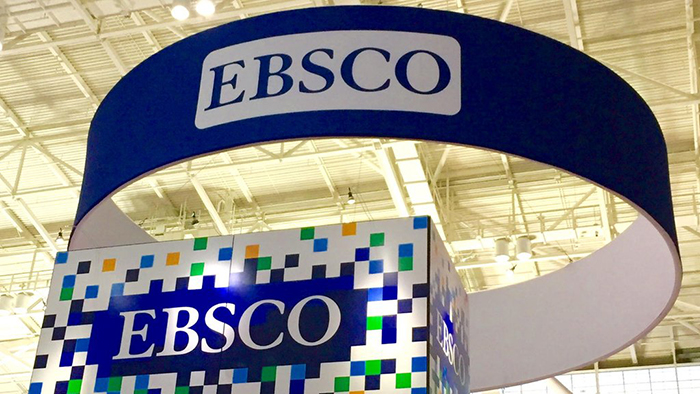
- EBSCO booth at 2017 ALA Midwinter
- Type: Subsidiary of EBSCO Industries
- Industry: Information services
- Founded: 1984
- Headquarters: Ipswich, Massachusetts, United States
- Products: EBSCO Discovery Service, EBSCOhost, EBSCO eBooks, EBSCO FOLIO, DynaMed, GOBI, EBSCO Learning, many others
- Website: ebsco.com

EBSCO Information Services, headquartered in Ipswich, Massachusetts, is a division of EBSCO Industries, a private company headquartered in Birmingham, Alabama. EBSCO provides products and services to libraries of many types around the world. Its products include EBSCONET, a complete e-resource management system, and EBSCOhost, which supplies a fee-based online research service with 375 full-text databases, a collection of 600,000-plus ebooks, subject indexes, point-of-care medical references, and an array of historical digital archives. In 2010, EBSCO introduced its EBSCO Discovery Service (EDS) to institutions, which allows searches of a portfolio of journals and magazines.

== History ==
EBSCO Information Services is a division of EBSCO Industries, a company founded in 1944 by Elton Bryson Stephens Sr. and headquartered in Birmingham, Alabama. "EBSCO" is an acronym for Elton B. Stephens Company. EBSCO Industries has annual sales of about $3 billion. It is one of the largest privately held companies in Alabama and one of the top 200 in the United States, based on revenues and employee numbers.

EBSCO Information Services originated in 1984 as a print publication called Popular Magazine Review, which featured article abstracts from more than 300 magazines. EBSCO Industries purchased the company in 1987 and changed its name to EBSCO Publishing. It employed around 750 people by 2007. EBSCO acquired database provider Whitston Publishing in 2003, NetLibrary in 2010, and the H. W. Wilson Company in 2011. On July 1, 2013, EBSCO Publishing merged with EBSCO Information Services, with the combined business operating under the latter name. In 2015, EBSCO acquired Yankee Book Peddler (YBP) Library Services from Baker & Taylor, and later renamed it GOBI Library Solutions.

Metapress was founded in 1998 as an online publication platform for content creators to produce and host their printed journal editions online. A division of EBSCO, the platform became one of the world's largest scholarly content hosts, with over 31,000 publications from over 180 publishers. Atypon acquired the Metapress business from EBSCO in 2014, discontinuing the Metapress platform and moving customers to Atypon's Literatum platform. Content was migrated to Literatum on May 21, 2015.

In February 2020, EBSCO Information Services agreed to acquire Zepheira, a company founded in February 2007 and headquartered in Reston, Virginia. Zepheira's leadership contributed to the development of Dublin Core, BIBFRAME, and the Library.Link Network. Following the acquisition, Zepheira continues to operate as an independent division.

== Products ==
- Databases: EBSCO provides a range of library database services. Many of the databases, such as MEDLINE and EconLit, are licensed from content vendors. Others, such as Academic Search, America: History and Life, Art Index, Art Abstracts, Art Full Text, Business Source, Clinical Reference Systems, Criminal Justice Abstracts, Education Abstracts, Environment Complete, Health Source, Historical Abstracts, History Reference Center, MasterFILE, NetLibrary, Primary Search, Professional Development Collection, and USP DI are compiled by EBSCO itself. EBSCO can be configured to route to open access publications through Unpaywall data. The company's Flipster interface also provides access to digital magazines.
- Discovery: Used to create a unified, customized index of an institution's information resources, and a means of accessing all the content from a single search box. The system works by harvesting metadata from both internal and external sources, and then creating a pre-indexed service.
- FOLIO: A microservices software platform in open-source model. EBSCO provides implementation for the core of software, hosting services, as well as actively contributing to its continued development.
- eBooks: Provides ebooks and audiobooks across a wide range of subject matter. EBSCO reports that their database includes over a million ebooks from over 1500 publishers. Provides DRM-protected e-books through its subsidiary NetLibrary, which was purchased in 2010 from Online Computer Library Center. It competes in this market with OverDrive's Digital Library Reserve.
- DynaMedex: A clinical decision support solution. Under a new name, DynaMedex, formerly DynaMed and Micromedex with Watson, continues to enhance clinical decision support and operations for healthcare providers and health systems is a clinical reference tool for physicians and other health care professionals for use at the point-of-care. In 2024, DynaMed was named 2024 Best in KLAS for clinical decision Support clinical resources by KLAS, a research firm that specializes in monitoring and reporting the performance of healthcare vendors. In 2012, it ranked highest among 10 online clinical resources in a study in the Journal of Clinical Epidemiology and also had the highest overall performance in the disease reference product category in two successive reports on clinical decision support resources by KLAS, a research firm that specializes in monitoring and reporting the performance of healthcare vendors.
- EBSCOed: A division focusing on the creation of interoperable learner records, credential wallets, and other services tailored towards the needs of workforce development agencies. EBSCOed is best known for its contributions to the Alabama Talent Triad, a project that seeks to connect Alabama employers with skilled workers.

== Philanthropy ==
Since 2015, EBSCO has awarded libraries around the world more than $2,000,000 in grants for solar installations.

== See also ==
- List of academic databases and search engines
