= American Society of Nephrology =

U.S. professional organization

- Founded: 1966; 60 years ago
- Type: Medical
- Purpose: Nephrology, Kidney Disease, Medical Research, Education and Public Policy
- Location: Washington, D.C., U.S.
- Region served: Worldwide
- Members: 20,000
- Key people: Mark. E. Rosenberg (President); Tod Ibrahim (Executive Vice President)
- Website: www.asn-online.org

Founded in 1966, the American Society of Nephrology (ASN) is the world's largest professional society devoted to the study of kidney disease. Composed of over 20,000 physicians and scientists, ASN promotes expert patient care, advances medical research, and educates the renal community. ASN also informs policymakers about issues of importance to kidney doctors and their patients.

== Research and publications ==
Each year, the ASN and the ASN Foundation for Kidney Research provide nearly 400 research and travel grants. ASN annual meetings are attended by approximately 13,000 participants, and regional meetings are held throughout the year. The society publishes the Journal of the American Society of Nephrology (JASN), the Clinical Journal of the American Society of Nephrology (CJASN), the Nephrology Self-Assessment Program (NephSAP), Kidney News and Kidney News Online, In The Loop, and more recently the Kidney Self Assessment Program (KSAP).

- JASN (1990–present) - original articles of the highest quality that are relevant to the broad field of nephrology. (impact factor 9.343)
- CJASN (2006–present) - dedicated to advancing the practice of renal medicine by reporting novel and rigorous clinical research. (impact factor 4.613)
- NephSAP - provides educational learning, and Continuing Medical Education (CME) credits, for clinical nephrologists who seek to renew and refresh their clinical knowledge and diagnostic and therapeutic.
- Kidney News (2009–present) - a news magazine that examines trends in medicine, industry, and policy affecting all practitioners in nephrology and provides other information supporting the work of kidney specialists.
- In the Loop - a daily news briefing tailored to the needs of nephrologists and summarizes key reporting on kidney and renal medicine from the previous 24 hours.
- KSAP (2015–present) - an online self-assessment program that uses a case-based format based on the American Board of Internal Medicine (ABIM) Examination Blueprint that reviews core elements of nephrology and is tailored for fellows and recertifying nephrologists

== Conferences and education ==
The ASN holds annual meetings (Kidney Week) and subsequent regional meetings (ASN Highlights) to discuss new developments in the field of nephrology. The ASN also provides an Annual Board Review Course & Update and other online learning opportunities for both established nephrologists and those in training. In 2012, nearly 1,200 instructional hours were offered by ASN to physicians, researchers, and other healthcare professionals.

In order to foster more interest in nephrology, the ASN has established the Kidney STARS Program in order to sponsor interested students and residents so they may attend the annual ASN meeting (Kidney Week). The program's goal is "to stimulate interest in nephrology careers by targeting medical students, residents, and graduate students with an interest in nephrology but have not yet committed to applying to a fellowship."

== Current and past presidents ==
- Mark E. Rosenberg (2018–Present) is the current President of the ASN.
- Mark D. Okusa (2017–2018) is the Past-President of the ASN.
- Jonathan Himmelfarb (2014–2015) Director of the Kidney Research Institute, and Professor of Medicine at the University of Washington.
- Sharon M. Moe (2013–2014), Professor of Medicine in the Department of Medicine at the Indiana University School of Medicine
- Bruce Molitoris (2012–2013), Professor of Medicine, Director of Nephrology and Director of the Indiana Center for Biological Microscopy at Indiana University
- Ronald J. Falk (2011–2012)
- Joseph V. Bonventre (2010–2011)
- Sharon Anderson (2009–2010), currently the Chair of the Department of Medicine at Oregon Health and Science University whose work helped to establish the beneficial effects of ACE inhibitors in diabetic nephropathy
- Thomas M. Coffman (2008–2009)
- Peter S. Aronson (2007–2008)
- William L. Henrich (2006–2007)
- Thomas D. DuBose, Jr. (2005–2006)
- Tomas Berl (2004–2005)
- William E. Mitch, III (2003–2004)
- Norman J. Siegel (2002–2003)
- Roland C. Blantz (2001–2002)
- Robert Jay Alpern (2000–2001)

== See also ==
- Nephrology
