= UNC School of Medicine =

Medical school of the University of North Carolina at Chapel Hill

Coordinates: 35.90605°N 79.05227°W

University of North Carolina School of Medicine
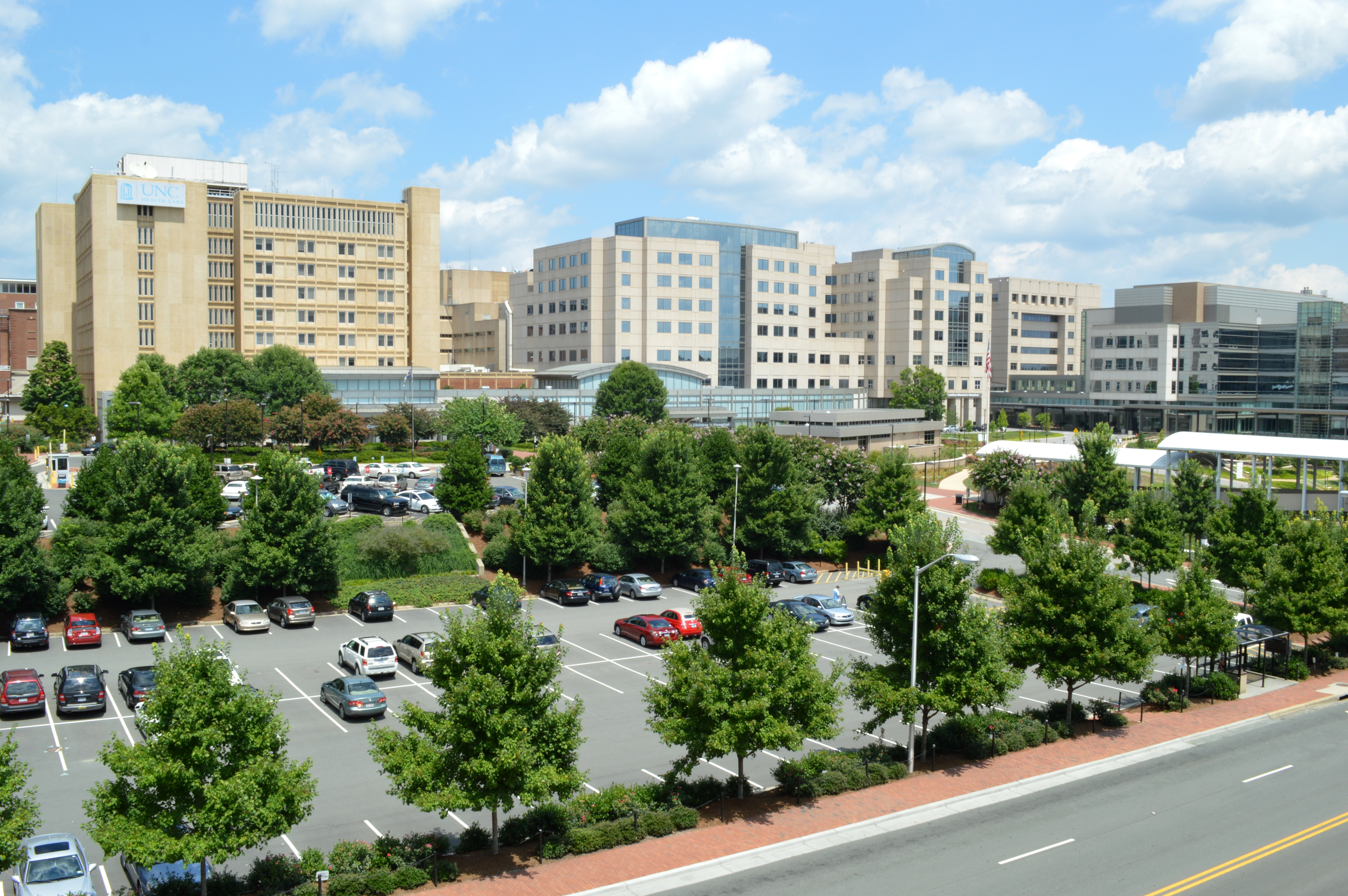
- N.C. Memorial Hospital (left), N.C. Children's Hospital (center), and N.C. Cancer Hospital (right) at UNC Hospitals, the main patient care and teaching facilities for the UNC School of Medicine.
- Established: 1879
- Dean: Cristy Page
- Location: University of North Carolina; Chapel Hill, North Carolina
- Campus: Suburban
- Website: med.unc.edu

The University of North Carolina School of Medicine (UNC School of Medicine, UNC SOM) is the medical school of the University of North Carolina at Chapel Hill. Founded in 1879, it is closely affiliated with UNC Health and UNC Medical Center, and serves as a major center for medical education, clinical care, and biomedical research in North Carolina.

The school offers a range of graduate and professional medical programs, including Doctor of Medicine (MD), combined MD/PhD, and combined MD/MPH degree programs, and academic health science programs including physical therapy, physician assistant, and clinical laboratory science.

== Research ==
The UNC School of Medicine operates eleven centers and institutes for research which conduct basic, translational, and clinical work, including the Cell and Molecular Physiology and Genetics Department, the Marsico Lung Institute, and the Lineberger Cancer Research Center.

Much of the School's research is conducted in collaboration with other UNC schools and programs, including the UNC Eshelman School of Pharmacy and the UNC Gillings School of Global Public Health. There are also many collaborations between UNC and nearby universities, including Duke University and North Carolina State University. The latter partnership led to the creation of the Lampe Joint Department for Biomedical Engineering, a shared department focused on biomedical engineering and innovation founded in 2003.

In 2024, the school received US$649 million in research funding, approximately 74% of which came from the National Institutes of Health.

Two researchers at UNC have been awarded Nobel Prizes: Oliver Smithies (2007 Nobel Prize in Medicine or Physiology) for his work on gene targeting and knockout mice, and Aziz Sancar (2015 Nobel Prize in Chemistry) for his work mapping the cellular mechanisms responsible for DNA repair.

== MD Curriculum ==
In August 2023, the UNC School of Medicine launched the second version of its Translational Education at Carolina (TEC) curriculum, known as TEC 2.0. The original TEC curriculum, first implemented in 2014, is designed to integrate basic science courses with longitudinal patient care, allowing students to gain clinical experience earlier than in traditional curricula. It consists of three key phases through which medical students progress.

=== Foundation Phase ===
The Foundation Phase lasts 18 months and includes coursework in basic, clinical, and social sciences. It features nine medical science courses, each lasting four to six weeks, as well as two 18-month courses focusing on basic clinical skills (such as history-taking, physical examination, and professionalism) and the social and health systems, covering topics like social and cultural factors affecting health, ethics, and policy. The Foundation Phase is primarily completed in academic settings, including lectures, laboratories, seminars, and small-group sessions, but also incorporates several weeks of clinical experience.

=== Application Phase ===
During the Application Phase, students spend 12 months completing clinical clerkships in family medicine, internal medicine, obstetrics and gynecology, pediatrics, psychiatry, and surgery. Students are assigned to one of six locations in North Carolina (Asheville, Chapel Hill, Charlotte, Greensboro, Raleigh, or Wilmington) for the duration of this phase. They apply the skills learned during the Foundation Phase by functioning as active members of healthcare teams.

=== Individualization Phase ===
Students may complete courses in Individualization Phase, often referred to as the "Indy" Phase, at any of the University of North Carolina School of Medicine campuses or sites. In this phase, the final year of their medical education, students take a variety of elective courses designed to tailor their education toward the specialty they plan to pursue. The phase also includes support for students’ transition into residency.

== Facilities ==
The UNC School of Medicine operates across 28 buildings on the southwest side of the UNC campus. Most academic activities take place in Bondurant Hall and Roper Hall, both of which have direct access to the UNC Medical Center. Eleven research buildings, including wet labs, offices, and meeting spaces, are located just south of the academic buildings, which include Marsico Hall, the Mary Ellen Jones Building, and the Lineberger Cancer Research Center. Additional support facilities are spread out across UNC's campus and the surrounding neighborhoods.

=== Academic ===
In September 2023, the UNC School of Medicine opened Roper Hall on the former site of Berryhill Hall, built in 1970, which had served as the primary training site for medical students. The 172,000-square-foot facility is a training center with a 25,000-square-foot immersive simulation and visualization lab, a 400-seat active learning theater, and six floors of classrooms and meeting spaces. The building is named for Bill Roper, who served as CEO of UNC Health Care, dean of the UNC School of Medicine, and interim president of the University of North Carolina.

Additional classrooms and administrative offices are located in Bondurant Hall on South Columbia Street, built in 2005 and named for Stuart Bondurant, who was dean of the School of Medicine from 1979 to 1994.

=== Hospitals ===
Most clinical teaching takes place in facilities operated by UNC Health, primarily within the UNC Medical Center complex at the southern tip of the UNC campus. The complex comprises five healthcare facilities collectively known as UNC Hospitals, including North Carolina Memorial Hospital, North Carolina Children’s Hospital, North Carolina Women’s Hospital, North Carolina Neurosciences Hospital, and North Carolina Cancer Hospital. In 2024, the North Carolina Surgical Hospital was opened, featuring 26 new surgical spaces and 80 inpatient rooms. Together, these facilities offer over 1,000 inpatient beds and are ranked as the 2nd best hospital in the state of North Carolina. Additional hospitals and outpatient clinics in the area are also used for training, including the Ambulatory Care Center, the Family Medicine Building, UNC Hillsborough, and UNC Chatham.

During the Application Phase (third year) of the school's MD program, students will be matched into one of six regions located across the state of North Carolina to complete their clinical clerkships at local facilities, including:

- Asheville: Mountain Area Health Education Center (MAHEC) and Mission Hospital.
- Central (including Chapel Hill, Greensboro, and Raleigh): UNC Health, UNC Rex, Wake Med, Piedmont Health, Central Regional Hospital, Cone Health, Regional UNC Physicians Network, and local independent practices.
- Charlotte: Novant Health Presbyterian, Huntersville, and Matthews medical centers.
- Wilmington: New Hanover Regional Medical Center and Southeastern Area Health Education Center (SEAHEC).

== Alumni ==
- Donna Feigley Barbisch (MPH), U.S. Army major general
- Francis Collins - director of the NIH, and head of the Human Genome Project
- J. Larry Jameson- interim President of the University of Pennsylvania
- J. Charles Jennette - physician and nephropathologist
- Ken Jeong - actor and comedian
- Christopher W. Lentz - U.S. Air Force Brigadier General
- Norman Sharpless - director of the National Cancer Institute (NCI)
