= Emergency NYC =

- Genre: Documentary
- Developed by: Ruthie Shatz; Adi Barash
- Country of origin: United States
- Original language: English
- No. of seasons: 1
- No. of episodes: 8 (list of episodes)

Production
- Executive producers: Ruthie Shatz; Adi Barash
- Cinematography: Adi Barash; Reuben Kleiner; Gregory Purpura; Bryant Fisher
- Editors: Ruthie Shatz; Helen Yum; Eric Agiro
- Running time: 40–45 minutes
- Production company: Yulari Films

Original release
- Network: Netflix
- Release: March 29, 2023

Emergency NYC is a Netflix documentary series about New York City's healthcare professionals as they strive to achieve a balance between their professional and personal lives. The series was developed by Ruthie Shatz and Adi Barash, creators of Lenox Hill, and premiered on Netflix on March 29, 2023.

== Summary ==
With its eight episodes, the documentary series immerses viewers in the dynamic world of physicians working at Northwell Health hospitals in New York City and Long Island. It chronicles the demanding and unforgiving daily routines of emergency medicine physicians, transplant surgeons, paramedics, pediatric trauma surgeons, and neurosurgeons who dedicate their lives to assisting those in dire need.

The show takes place in a rotating format through Cohen Children's Medical Center, North Shore University Hospital, Lenox Hill Hospital and Lenox Health Greenwich Village all located in the New York Metro Area. Lenox Hill and Lenox Health are both in Manhattan while Cohen Children's Medical Center and North Shore University Hospital are near the Nassau County/Queens border in New Hyde Park and Manhasset respectively. The docuseries also shows through the perspective of ambulance and SkyHealth emergency medical helicopter crews.

The show follows real life Pre-Hospital, Trauma, and acute cases and surgeries.

== Release ==
Emergency NYC was released on March 29, 2023, on Netflix.

== Episodes ==
No.	Title	Directed by	Original release date
1	“You’re Not Alone”	Adi Barash Ruthie Shatz	March 29, 2023
2	“Ready or Not”	Adi Barash Ruthie Shatz	March 29, 2023
3	“Under Pressure”	Adi Barash Ruthie Shatz	March 29, 2023
4	“Walking to America”	Adi Barash Ruthie Shatz	March 29, 2023
5	“No Guts No Glory”	Adi Barash Ruthie Shatz	March 29, 2023
6	“Home Sweet Home”	Adi Barash Ruthie Shatz	March 29, 2023
7	“Reset”	Adi Barash Ruthie Shatz	March 29, 2023
8	“Change of Heart”	Adi Barash Ruthie Shatz	March 29, 2023

== Reception ==
The show, as reviewed by Indie Wire, “presents the realities of these jobs in a matter-of-fact way that shows respect for the people being profiled. The crew of Emergency NYC is seen working tirelessly in ambulances and helicopters to ensure that patients arrive at their intended destination as quickly as possible while keeping them alive.”

The Wall Street Journal notes that, “the show provides a comprehensive view of the medical system, including the perspective of medical technicians, helicopter nurses, trauma doctors, pediatric surgeons, transport coordinators, and patients who have been brought back from the brink of death.”

== Viewership ==
According to U.S. streaming data reported by Media Play News using PlumResearch figures, Emergency: NYC drew 4.7 million unique viewers on Netflix during the week ending April 2, 2023, with an average time spent of 108 minutes.

== See also ==
- Cohen Children's Medical Center
- Lenox Health Greenwich Village
- Lenox Hill Hospital
- North Shore University Hospital
