= David Giorgio Mendes Nassi =

Israeli orthopedic surgeon (born 1937)

- דוד ג'ורג'יו מנדס
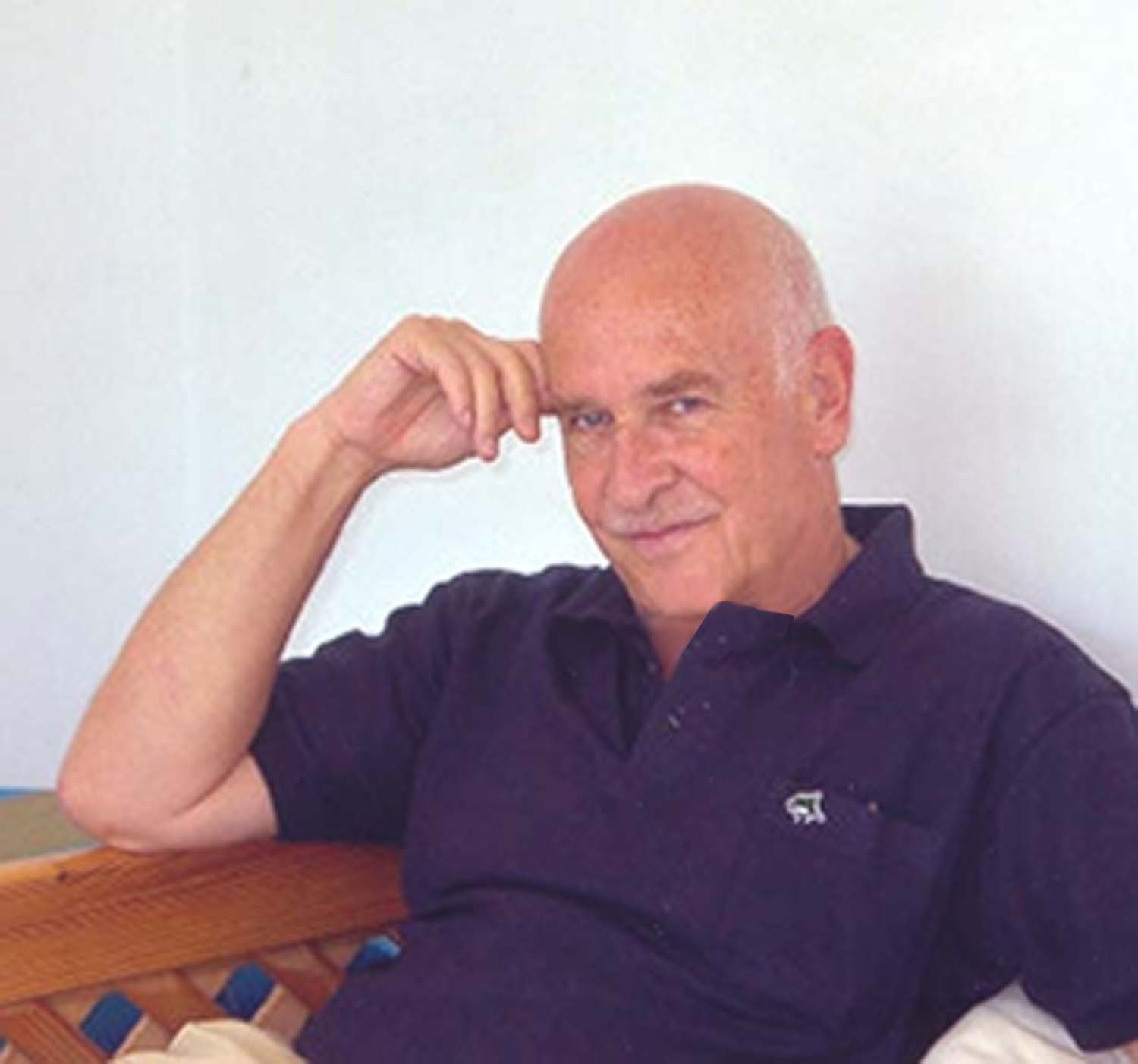
- Born: 11 February 1937; Rome, Italy
- Occupation: Orthopedic Surgeon

David Giorgio Mendes Nassi (Hebrew: דוד ג'ורג'יו מנדס) is an Israeli orthopedic surgeon who has developed advanced methodologies and systems in the area of Hip and Knee artificial joint replacement. .

== Biography ==
Born in 1937 in Rome, Mendes Nassi is descended from a line of physicians. His grandfather, Guido Aaron Mendes, directed the Red Cross Hospital in Rome during the 1930s. As Italian Fascist law instituted a regime of prejudice against Jews in Italy, he moved his family to Switzerland to await British permission to enter the territory of Palestine, later to become the state of Israel. These certificates were obtained with the direct intervention of Pope Pius 12th, a classmate and close friend to Guido.

The family moved to Gedera in Israel where David’s father, Maor Mendes and his grandfather pioneered the treatment and obliteration of Tuberculosis in Israel. During the 1947–1949 Palestine war the family moved to Ramat Gan, where he graduated from Ohel Shem high school.

During his time in Ramat Gan, he practiced fencing and went on to become captain of the Israeli team. He won all national foil competitions in Israel between the years 1955 and 1963. He then joined the army and married his childhood friend, Nili Shmueli.

In 1965 David relocated with his family to the United States to continue his training. He remained in New York City until 1975 when he returned to Israel with his wife and two children, Ido and Sharone. His third child, Yonni, was born in Haifa a few years later.

== Medical career ==
In 1955 he joined the IDF and graduated an Artillery officers training course. He then began his academic studies at the Hadassah school of Medicine in Jerusalem. After his graduation he started Orthopedics under Dr Ernst Spira and was posted as a military doctor in the 52nd brigade of the Armored Corps.

In 1965 he moved to New York to specialize in Orthopaedic Surgery at the Mount Sinai School of Medicine and the Albert Einstein College of Medicine under Professor Arthur Helfet. At the end of his training he studied Artificial Hip Joint replacement under Professor Philip Wilson II at the Cornell University Hospital for Special Surgery. He then moved to the Lenox Hill Hospital where he established the Hip Surgery clinic with Dr James Nicholas.

During his time in New York, he lectured at Albert Einstein, Mount Sinai, Elmhurst and the Brooklyn Children’s hospitals. During the wars in Israel, Six Days War (1967) and Yom Kippur War (1973) he volunteered as a surgeon in the IDF Medical corps.

In 1975 he returned to Israel to take up the position of Head of the Orthopaedic Surgery at Bnai Zion Hospital in Haifa.

Mendes ran the department of Orthopaedic Surgery until his retirement in 2002. His department offered a variety of innovative surgical procedures to patients from the entire country. Care was given to elderly, adults and infants for Orthopedic diseases benign and malignant and for injuries ranging from sports accidents to war casualties including rehabilitation of amputees. Most challenging was the initiation of Joints Replacement with Artificial Implants of the Hip and Knee for diseases such as Arthritis (Rheumatism).

In 1980 Mendes formed the Center for Implant Surgery which gained the support of then Minister of Health, Eliezer Shostak and the Hospital director Dov Golan. The center was an ambitious project aimed at treating patients for furthering the research and development of Artificial Implants and advanced Biomaterials to upgrade them. The center was later recognized as a National Institute by Minister of Health, Shoshana Arbeli-Almozlino.

Mendes organized and directed a series of annual International Orthopaedic Surgery Conventions which ran for fifteen years, attracting researchers, scientists, surgeons and medical industry entrepreneurs from around the world.

== Academic and professional activities ==
Throughout 37 years of activity, Mendes published some 150 articles, During this time, he created various inventions and innovations in the field of Implant Surgery, Bio materials, Orthopedic instruments and surgical techniques. As a result, he is the owner of several international patents.

Mendes introduced the Total Knee Arthroplasty operation for the first time in Israel, a technology he studied in the USA. By combining materials developed in Germany and France, he was able to extend the service life of the implant.

As part of his activities in the Center for Implant Surgery, Mendes created a platform for cooperation with researchers from the Technion, the Hebrew University and the high tech industry. These efforts were directed at the investigation of influence of different types of energy on bone restructure and fracture healing, development of new implants and replacement parts for joints and ligaments and contributed to the arising field of Computed Tomography. Together with International teams financed by the German-Israel Foundation, Mendes managed several research efforts into the replacement of ligaments with synthetic fibers and the design of artificial replacement of the bony patella.

=== Total Hip Arthroplasty for DDH in the Adult ===
A clinical research based on Xrays and Computed Tomography aimed at establishing an algorithm of the challenging surgical technique in a condition with distorted anatomy of the hip joint. The system served for self-assessment of Orthopedic Surgeons in the USA.

=== Arthroplasty of the knee with artificial implant ===
Total Knee Arthroplasty was first re-designed in England and developed in the USA during the early seventies of the previous Century. In 1975 first time in Israel, Knee Arthroplasty was done in the Center for Implant Surgery in Haifa. Within short time the procedure was routinely done in other Israeli Orthopedic departments, years ahead prior to its penetration into European Orthopedics

=== Carbon-Carbon Composite for Hip Joint Implant ===
The main properties required from an artificial joint implant are long term strength and stability under cyclic load (up to seven times body weight), bio-chemical inertness, wear resistance and biological bio-compatibility. Years of clinical experience with a variety of metals and polymers fell short of achieving all the requirements. Carbon is the basic component of organic material and in certain configurations is extremely stable mechanically and chemically. In this pioneer collaboration between Rafael industry and scientists from the Technion, a carbon composite hip implant was constructed. The implant was created using carbon fibers and carbon matrix. The result achieved three dimensions stability in compression and tension. The composite hip was implanted in animal experiments at the Technion laboratory by a team of the Center for Implant Surgery. These experiments did, however, uncover the one disadvantage of carbon composite: weakness in resistance to wear in friction and cyclic motion.

=== Evaluation of the Degree of Effectiveness of Biobeam Low Level Narrow Band Light on the Treatment of Skin Ulcers and Delayed Postoperative Wound Healing ===
The study conducted (in 1992) double blind clinical trial under regular hospital conditioned showed statistical significant results in the treatment with narrow band red light (660 nm) in comparison to placebo. It proved that low light narrow band has a significant role in the treatment of skin ulcers and delayed amputees and operative wounds.

=== Pain Free Arthritis Exercises ===
Together with physiotherapists Kobi Schwartz and Danny Kelman, Dr. Mendes developed a system of painless 'reverse action' and 'gravity dependent' exercises to preserve Hip joint mobility. The system has been tested with rewarding results for more than twenty years. The term 'praying exercises' was chosen due to the similarity to movements during rituals in a variety of religions. Later was modified to 'Pain Free Exercises. The exercises move the joint in maximal range with painless motions, keeping low joint pressure, and lubricate the articular cartilage to maintain its viability by alternating light pressure.

== Published works ==
In 2013, Mendes published "Mendes System of Praying Exercises for the Hip Joints", through Kotarim International Publishing. In 2014, he published a new edition, "Mendes System Pain Free Arthritis Exercises", through Kotarim International Publishing.

In 2019, Prof. Mendes published through Niv books a Hebrew edition "Who is Afraid of Medical Malpractice? Insights about Medicine and Law" He lights up the little-known world of medical malpractice and uses his experience to lay out five mental attitudes that cause doctors to make mistakes and lead them down a slippery slope.

"Diary of Coronavirus family" a book published through Partridge Singapore April 2021 The Coronavirus family, a rowdy group of viruses who use the Human Beings as entertainment and cause them all sorts of trouble, gathers together and reminisces about the past, including various epidemics that they brought about over the course of history, up until the day that the Coronavirus pandemic broke out, leaving the Human Beings confused and helpless. The Coronavirus, whose name is CoV-2, describes how he caused the pandemic while also voicing some harsh criticism regarding the way the Human Beings chose to cope with it. Mama educates the virion, the youngster virus, about the tradition and life cycle of viruses, their genetics and how to grow to adulthood. Her beloved son Cov-2 is the virus involved in the break out of the COVID-19 in Wuhan, and he challenges himself to spread the epidemic to human beings worldwide. Starting in Jerusalem, he then moves with his team of viruses as clandestine passengers in migrating birds to Europe and the USA. The coronavirus family discusses in their periodic meetings the foolish reaction of the surprised leaders of those nations, and raises doubts about the efficiency and the value of their new vaccines against the variants and mutations that the viruses create with nonchalance and ease. Toward the end of the saga the wise Virionette surprises everybody with a new idea thinking outside the box. This is the tale of the Coronavirus from an unconventional point of view, whose purpose is to educate children and adolescents about how viruses work and ultimately – how to rid ourselves of them.

"Waiting for the Coronavirus in the Kingdom of PAMONA"' a book published through Partridge Singapore August 2021 After a long pause the king said, 'Tell me, how can we be different from all the other countries hit by the pandemic, whose morbidity and mortality rates are so frighteningly high? How can we think differently, how should we be thinking Dean-el wrote that to overcome the viral epidemics that will be visiting upon us in the future, we have to develop a nature-based vaccine composed of what he called nano-Yaho' particles and turn them into effective and safe method to defeat all kinds of viruses. This is a tale told by the ancient Pamonan people who left the Middle East and settled in the f Indonesian archipelago, founded a prosperous kingdom and faced the coronavirus pandemic that spread from China. King Nur-el with his team of advisors, the high shaman Polano, Talis his aide and the doctor, discuss the nature of the coronavirus family and the epidemic in detail to create a plan to defeat the pandemic at the gates of the kingdom.

"Halting the Coronavirus at the Gates of Pamona" a book published through Kotarim International Publishing in November 2021.
