= David Langer (neurosurgeon) =

American neurosurgeon (born 1963)

David Jonathan Langer
- Born: David Jonathan Langer; June 18, 1963
- Citizenship: US
- Education: University of Pennsylvania, B.S.; Perelman School of Medicine, M.D.
- Occupation: Physician
- Known for: Chair of Neurosurgery at Lenox Hill Hospital; Star in the Netflix docuseries Lenox Hill and Emergency NYC
- Medical career
- Profession: Professor of Neurosurgery and Radiology
- Institutions: Lenox Hill Hospital; Northwell Health; North Shore University Hospital
- Sub-specialties: Neurosurgery
- Website: www.northwell.edu/about/leadership/david-langer-md

David J. Langer is an American neurosurgeon who is chair of neurosurgery at Lenox Hill Hospital in New York City. In addition, he is a professor of neurosurgery and radiology at the Donald and Barbara Zucker School of Medicine at Hofstra/Northwell. Langer was a star on two Netflix docu-series, Lenox Hill in 2020, and Emergency: NYC in 2023.

Langer has made appearances on several news programs including CNN, Fox News, ABC News, and CBS, and has written articles for The New York Times and The Wall Street Journal. In addition. Langer is a peer reviewer for the medical journals Neurosurgery and World Neurosurgery.

== History ==
David Jonathan Langer was born on June 18, 1963, to parents Terry and Joan Langer.

Langer attended the University of Pennsylvania for his bachelor's degree and later attended the University of Pennsylvania Perelman School of Medicine for his medical degree, graduating in 1991.

As an undergraduate medical student and neurological surgical resident at University of Pennsylvania, Langer worked with Katalin Karikó. Langer published two articles with Karikó, in 1998 and 2001, on their early mRNA delivery research. This ultimately led Karikó to publish the work that led directly to the development of the Moderna and BioNTech mRNA COVID-19 vaccines.

Langer did his residency in neurological surgery at the Hospital of the University of Pennsylvania from 1992 to 1998, later completing fellowships at Mount Sinai Beth Israel and University at Buffalo.

Langer was recruited by Northwell Health in 2013 to establish a neurosurgery department at Lenox Hill Hospital. Since then, the department has evolved to land Lenox Hill Hospital among U.S. News & World Report's top 50 hospitals for neurology and neurosurgery. He also maintains an active practice in spinal disease and benign brain tumors, including acoustic neuromas and meningiomas.

In January 2018, Langer co-founded Playback Health with Gregory Odland. Playback is a mobile platform application that allows health care providers to create multimedia reports and medical instructions that are shared directly with patients. As of December 2020, Playback has raised $3 million.

In August 2019, Langer was relaxing on a beach in Amagansett, New York when a fellow beachgoer fell off of his surfboard and could no longer feel his limbs. Langer rushed to help the man and stabilized his neck with boogie boards, motivating the man to try and move his toes. Langer ultimately ended up operating on the man.

In 2020 Langer starred in the Netflix docu-series, Lenox Hill, a Netflix Original that shadowed four doctors in the areas of neurosurgery, emergency medicine, and obstetrics and gynecology at the Lenox Hill Hospital. The series provides a real-life look into his role as a neurosurgeon and chief of neurosurgery in a rising New York City neuro program. Langer starred on the docu-series along with his vice-chair of neurosurgery, Dr. John Boockvar.

During the 2020 COVID-19 pandemic, Langer was reassigned to help cover the COVID-19 unit at Lenox Hill. He went to the temporary hospital at the Jacob K. Javits Convention Center to help out and pick up shifts.

In early 2022, Langer suffered a spinal cord injury in a skiing accident in Colorado, leaving him temporarily paralyzed. He returned to New York, and regained full sensation and mobility.

== See also ==
- Lenox Hill
- Lenox Hill Hospital
- University of Pennsylvania Perelman School of Medicine
