= James Marcus =

James Marcus may refer to:

- James Marcus (American actor) (1867–1937), American actor
- James Marcus (English actor) (1942–2024), English actor
- James Marcus (Resident Evil), video game character
- James S. Marcus (1929–2015), American investment banker and philanthropist
