= Adi Barash =

Israeli-American documentary filmmaker

- Born: 1970 (age 55–56); Tel Aviv, Israel
- Occupations: Documentary filmmaker, cinematographer, writer, executive producer
- Years active: 2000–present
- Known for: Garden, The Collaborator and His Family, Lenox Hill, Emergency NYC
- Spouse: Ruthie Shatz

Adi Barash (born 1970) is an Israeli-American documentary filmmaker, cinematographer, writer and executive producer. Working primarily with filmmaker Ruthie Shatz, he has directed documentary films and television series including Diamonds and Rust (2001), Garden (2003), The Collaborator and His Family (2011), the Israeli medical series Ichilov and Ambulance Israel, and the Netflix series Lenox Hill (2020) and Emergency NYC (2023).

== Early life and education ==
Barash was born in Tel Aviv in 1970 and spent part of his childhood near the port of Haifa, where his father was a tanker-ship captain. His family later lived on the Upper West Side of New York City before returning to Israel. He studied filmmaking at the Camera Obscura School of Art in Tel Aviv and received the school's award in 1998.

Before beginning his filmmaking career, Barash worked aboard a diamond-mining vessel off the coast of Namibia. The experience became the basis of his first feature documentary with Shatz.

== Career ==
=== Early documentary films ===
Barash and Shatz's first feature documentary, Diamonds and Rust, observed working and racial tensions aboard a diamond-mining ship operating off the Namibian coast. Barash co-directed, co-wrote, produced and served as cinematographer on the film. The film received the International SCAM Award at the 2001 Cinéma du Réel festival and a Golden Gate Award at the San Francisco International Film Festival.

Their second feature, Garden, followed two young Palestinian men living and working in Tel Aviv's red-light district. The project received an initial grant and later a supplemental grant from the Sundance Institute Documentary Fund. It screened at the 2004 Sundance Film Festival and at international documentary and LGBTQ film festivals. In 2021, filmmaker Barry Jenkins, serving as guest director of the Telluride Film Festival, selected Garden for a retrospective screening attended by Barash and Shatz.

Barash later directed, produced and photographed Yuri Foreman: The Next Jewish Boxer, a documentary about boxer Yuri Foreman.

In 2011, Barash and Shatz directed The Collaborator and His Family, which follows a Palestinian man who had worked with Israeli security services and the effects of his decisions on his family. Barash also served as the film's cinematographer and one of its producers. The film received the Robert and Frances Flaherty Prize, the top award at the 2011 Yamagata International Documentary Film Festival, as well as the Special Jury Award and Research Award at Docaviv.

=== Television and medical documentaries ===
Barash and Shatz subsequently moved into documentary television. They wrote, directed and produced Ichilov, an observational series filmed at Tel Aviv Sourasky Medical Center. A second season, Ichilov 2, followed, as did Ambulance Israel, centered on paramedics and emergency medical personnel. These projects established the observational approach to medical institutions that the filmmakers later developed for American television.

In 2020, Netflix released Lenox Hill, created, directed and executive-produced by Barash and Shatz. The series follows four physicians working within New York's Lenox Hill Hospital system. Barash was also one of its principal cinematographers. A special episode, filmed during the early months of the COVID-19 pandemic in New York City, was released later that year.

Lenox Hill received a 100 percent approval rating from 15 reviews on Rotten Tomatoes and a weighted score of 87 out of 100 on Metacritic, indicating "universal acclaim". It was nominated for Best Multi-Part Documentary at the 2020 International Documentary Association Awards.

Barash and Shatz returned to New York healthcare for Emergency: NYC, an eight-part Netflix series released in March 2023. The series expanded beyond the hospital setting to follow emergency physicians, surgeons, paramedics and flight nurses across the city and Long Island. Barash co-directed and executive-produced the series and again worked as a cinematographer. The series received a 100 percent approval rating from five critic reviews on Rotten Tomatoes.

=== Production company and representation ===
Barash and Shatz founded the independent production company that became Yulari Films, based in Brooklyn, New York. UTA signed the filmmakers and the company for representation in 2021. In 2022, Barash and Shatz signed with Creative Artists Agency.

== Personal life ==
Barash is married to his longtime creative collaborator Ruthie Shatz. They have three children.

== Selected filmography ==
Year	Title	Role
2001	Diamonds and Rust	Director, writer, producer, cinematographer
2003	Garden	Director, writer, producer, cinematographer
2009	Yuri Foreman: The Next Jewish Boxer	Director, producer, cinematographer
2011	The Collaborator and His Family	Director, producer, cinematographer
2013	Ichilov	Director, writer, producer
2016	Ichilov 2	Director, writer, producer
2018	Ambulance Israel	Director, writer, producer
2020	Lenox Hill	Creator, director, writer, executive producer, cinematographer
2023	Emergency: NYC	Creator, director, executive producer, cinematographer
