= Ruthie Shatz =

Israeli documentary filmmaker

- Occupations: Documentary filmmaker, director, producer, writer, editor
- Years active: 2001–present
- Known for: Garden, The Collaborator and His Family, Lenox Hill, Emergency: NYC

Ruthie Shatz is an American documentary filmmaker, director, producer, writer and editor. Working frequently with filmmaker Adi Barash, she has directed the documentary films Diamonds and Rust (2001), Garden (2003) and The Collaborator and His Family (2011), as well as the documentary television series Ichilov, Ambulance Israel, Lenox Hill and Emergency: NYC.

Her film Garden received Sundance Documentary Fund grants in both 2002 and 2003 before screening in the World Documentary program at the 2004 Sundance Film Festival. Shatz and Barash's films have received awards at international documentary festivals, including the Robert and Frances Flaherty Prize for The Collaborator and His Family. Lenox Hill was nominated for Best Multi-Part Documentary at the International Documentary Association's 2020 Documentary Awards.

== Early life and education ==
Shatz was born on a kibbutz in Israel. She graduated from the full program at the Sam Spiegel Film and Television School in Jerusalem in 1998. She later served as a senior lecturer and script-pitching adviser at the school.

== Career ==
=== Early documentary films ===
Shatz's documentary directorial debut was Diamonds and Rust, co-directed with Barash. The film follows the multinational crew of the diamond-mining vessel Spirit of Namibia off the coast of Namibia. It received the International SCAM Award at the 2001 Cinéma du Réel festival and a Golden Gate Award at the 2001 San Francisco International Film Festival.

Shatz and Barash next directed and produced Garden, about two young men living and working in the Electricity Garden area of Tel Aviv. The film follows its subjects, Nino and Dudu, as they encounter violence, drug addiction, imprisonment and discrimination. It received Sundance Documentary Fund grants in 2002 and 2003, as well as support from the Alter-Ciné Foundation. The film screened in the World Documentary program at the 2004 Sundance Film Festival. Variety reviewed the film following its 2004 release. In addition to its Yamagata award, Garden received a Special Mention at the 2004 Seville European Film Festival and Best Documentary Film at the 2005 Turin International Gay and Lesbian Film Festival. In 2021, the film screened at the 48th Telluride Film Festival as one of six special selections curated by the festival's guest director, Barry Jenkins, with Shatz and Barash appearing in person.

Their third feature documentary, The Collaborator and His Family, follows a Palestinian family living in Tel Aviv after the father worked with Israeli security services. Shatz and Barash first encountered the family while making Garden. The film won the Robert and Frances Flaherty Prize, the grand prize of the 2011 Yamagata International Documentary Film Festival, awarded by an international jury chaired by filmmaker Atom Egoyan. Shatz subsequently took part in a 2012 Yamagata retrospective that screened both films.

=== Television documentaries ===
Shatz and Barash wrote, directed and produced the Israeli documentary series Ichilov, which follows medical residents at Tel Aviv's Ichilov Hospital. The series returned for a second season in 2016. Shatz and Barash subsequently directed Ambulance Israel, an adaptation of the British documentary format Ambulance, following emergency teams from Magen David Adom.

In 2020, Shatz and Barash created, directed and executive-produced the Netflix documentary series Lenox Hill. The series follows four physicians working in neurosurgery, emergency medicine, and obstetrics and gynecology at Lenox Hill Hospital in New York City. The filmmakers returned to the hospital during the beginning of the COVID-19 pandemic to make an additional episode.

Lenox Hill received favorable reviews from The Hollywood Reporter, Variety and Time. The New York Times included it in its selection of the best television shows of 2020, and its first season holds a 100% approval rating on Rotten Tomatoes, based on 15 critic reviews.

Shatz and Barash subsequently created and directed Emergency: NYC, released by Netflix in 2023. The series broadened the earlier program's focus to emergency medical workers across New York City and received reviews from IndieWire, The Wall Street Journal and Newsday. Time named it among the best new television shows its critic watched in March 2023.

== Filmography ==
Year	Title	Role
2001	Diamonds and Rust	Director
2003	Garden	Director, producer
2009	Yuri Foreman	Director
2011	The Collaborator and His Family	Director, cinematographer
2011–2017	Ichilov	Director, writer, producer
2018	Ambulance Israel	Director
2020	Lenox Hill	Director, executive producer, editor
2020	Lenox Hill: Pandemic	Director
2023	Emergency: NYC	Director, executive producer
