= National Maritime Union Building =

National Maritime Union Building may refer to multiple buildings constructed for the National Maritime Union in Manhattan:

- Maritime Hotel
- Lenox Health Greenwich Village
