= Nicholas Institute of Sports Medicine and Athletic Trauma =

US research facility

The Nicholas Institute of Sports Medicine and Athletic Trauma (NISMAT) is a sports medicine research, training, and clinical service facility.

NISMAT was founded in 1973 at Lenox Hill Hospital in Manhattan by James A. Nicholas. Nicholas was the team physician for the New York Titans in 1960 when he began studying the pathology of sports-related injuries and developed a set of performance factors used to evaluate individual athletic capacities. These factors include neuromuscular and physical traits like strength, speed, and endurance; mental and psychometric factors like creativity and discipline; and environmental factors, which include playing conditions, equipment, and practice. Early research in the institute led to a greater understanding of the linkage system, a set of principles detailing the interrelationship of organ systems and prescribing a multidisciplinary approach to clinical care.

In 1975, NISMAT founded the first sports medicine fellowship, offering specialty training to orthopedic physicians.
