= James A. Nicholas =

American surgeon (1921–2006)

James A. Nicholas (1921 – July 15, 2006) was an American orthopedic surgeon and a pioneer in the treatment of athletic injuries who was best known for performing four knee operations that saved the career of Hall of Fame quarterback Joe Namath. Nicholas was among the best-known orthopedic surgeons in the United States as a physician for the New York Jets, the New York Knicks and the New York Rangers. He obtained his undergraduate degree at New York University in 1942 and went to medical school at the Long Island College of Medicine (now SUNY Downstate Health Sciences University) in 1945. In 1973 he established the Nicholas Institute of Sports Medicine and Athletic Trauma at Lenox Hill Hospital in Manhattan, New York. Nicholas was a long time member of Westchester Country Club. He died of colon cancer at age 85.

Nicholas' son Stephen was also an orthopedic surgeon, and took over as head of the Nicholas Institute of Sports Medicine and Athletic Trauma in 2001. niece Connie Carberg was the National Football League's first female scout in 1976 for the Jets.
