= Connie Carberg =

American football executive

Personal information
- Born: 1950 or 1951 (age 75–76)

Career information
- College: Ohio State

Career history
- New York Jets (1976–1977) Scout; New York Jets (1977–1980) Personnel assistant

Connie Carberg (née Nicholas; born 1950/1951) is an American former football executive. In 1976, she became the first female scout in the National Football League (NFL), working in the New York Jets' scouting department from 1976 to 1980.

== Early life ==
Carberg's father, Calvin Nicholas, was the Jets' team doctor from 1962 to 1987, and her uncle, James A. Nicholas, was a team orthopedist credited with saving Joe Namath's career.

Carberg grew up in Babylon, New York, and made mock drafts as a hobby. She played college basketball at Wheaton College for two years before transferring to Ohio State University. While at Ohio State, she received permission from head football coach Woody Hayes to attend team practices. She graduated in 1974 with a degree in home economics.

== Professional career ==
Carberg intended to become a high school teacher after graduation, but Hayes recommended that she consider a career in sports. New York Jets head coach Charley Winner met her at a party hosted by her father Calvin and convinced her to join the team as a receptionist. The team allowed her to make the final selection in the 1975 NFL draft, and she chose tight end Mark Bartoszek from Ohio State in the 17th round.

After seeing her abilities to judge players on their skills, in 1976, the Jets' general manager Al Ward gave her a full-time position in the scouting department and she became the NFL's first female scout. She worked under directors of player personnel Homer Edington, Mike Holovak, and Mike Hickey during her time with the team. She was known as "The Girl Scout" by other Jets front office staff members. In her first season, Carberg was assigned to scout Big Ten Conference football players for the Jets, and traveled to games and practices. Beginning in 1977, she was unable to scout on the road like the other members of the department due to owner Leon Hess' hesitation in having a woman continue to perform those tasks. Instead, she graded players' game film and interviewed prospects from the team offices as a personnel assistant.

Carberg helped the Jets evaluate Mark Gastineau before the 1979 NFL draft. The team was coaching in the Senior Bowl and needed another defensive lineman on the roster due to a vacancy, so Carberg called several prospects before suggesting Gastineau to be the replacement based on a phone conversation with him. He was projected to be an eighth round draft pick at the time, but due to his performance in the Senior Bowl and other pre-draft processes, the Jets selected him in the second round and he became the NFL's all-time sack leader. She was also credited with helping the Jets in their selection of two-time Pro Bowl selection Wesley Walker, who was blind in one eye, in the second round of the 1977 NFL draft.

== After football ==
After the 1980 NFL season, she married John Carberg. She moved with him to Coral Springs, Florida, so he could take a job with Toyota, and she became a housewife. She has two children.

In July 2000, Carberg was named director of public relations for the Toyota dealership in Coconut Creek, Florida. She was the director of the Coral Springs Basketball Recreation League for 15 years and worked as a counselor at a youth basketball camp. In 2017, she wrote a book titled X's and O's Don't Mean I Love You about her experiences as the first female NFL scout.
