= Kotarim International Publishing =

Kotarim International Publishing (KIP) is an Israeli publishing house owned and directed by Moshe Alon, focusing on international online Print on demand and electronic book distribution for Israeli and foreign writers in the English language.

== Moshe Alon ==
Moshe Alon founded his first newspaper Yediot Hagalil in 1974 in the Galilee. In 1983 he founded Zomet Hasharon, a local newspaper in the Sharon region of Israel and was its editor-in-chief for several years. He won the Ziv prize for journalism in 1986. Alon later became the editor-in-chief of Olam Haisha, a monthly woman's journal. He has hosted radio shows and was the editor-in-chief of El Al’s Atmosphere magazine. Alon also taught Communications at the Interdisciplinary Center (IDC) in Herzliya. At the beginning of the millennium, he founded KIP. He has written a children’s book and a history book in Hebrew.

== Books and Genres ==
The main genres Kotarim publishes are:

- Holocaust books: Including Heroism in the Forest: The Jewish Partisans of Belarus, by Zeev Barmatz and Memories that Won’t Go Away: A Tribute to the Children of the Kindertransport, by Michele M. Gold."
- Biography and Memoir: Such as new biography of the late Israeli prime minister Yitzhak Rabin by Robert Slater, Rabin: 20 Years After and Freedom & Loneliness, by Avraham Aviel.
- Fiction: e.g. The Black Sun by Amnon Rubinstein.
- Non-fiction: Such as How to: Be Healthy, Be Happy by Prof. Ervin Y. Kedar and Mendes System Pain Free Arthritis Exercises by Prof. David G. Mendes MD.
- Hebrew books: Including, The Music of Leadership by Rosh HaAyin mayor Moshe Sinai and Current affairs by Dr. Aharon Yitzhaki.
