= Kathleen Ankers =

American scenic designer Married Victor Allan (Somoggi) Daughter Victoria

- Born: October 22, 1919; Ealing, England
- Died: October 24, 2001 (aged 82); Lenox Hill Hospital, New York City
- Occupations: scenic designer, actress

Kathleen Ankers (22 October 1919 - 24 October 2001) was an American scenic designer, best known for her work on The Rosie O'Donnell Show and the Late Show with David Letterman.

== Early life ==
Born in Ealing, London, Ankers moved to the US in the late 1940s. She did occasional Broadway costume design (Fancy Meeting You Again [1952]; My Sister, My Sister [1974]) and set design (Mr. Pickwick [1952]) but spent most of her career in television.

== Television career ==
Ankers' television credits include Late Night with David Letterman, Late Show with David Letterman, ESPN's SportsCenter, the original Sale of the Century, The Rosie O'Donnell Show, He Said, She Said, and The $128,000 Question.

She appeared on Late Night as the "NBC Bookmobile Lady", "Peggy, the Foul-Mouthed Chambermaid", and on Late Show with David Letterman as various characters.

She won two Daytime Emmy Awards for her work on The Rosie O'Donnell Show (2000 and posthumously in 2002) and one Primetime Emmy for Late Show With David Letterman (1995).

Ankers died of lung cancer on October 24, 2001, in Lenox Hill Hospital, New York City at the age of 82.
