= James S. Marcus =

American philanthropist and investment banker

James Stewart Marcus (15 December 1929 – 5 July 2015) was an American philanthropist and investment banker at Goldman Sachs who supported classical music, opera, and the vocal arts in and around New York City. He served as chairman of the Board of Directors of the Metropolitan Opera for eight years.

== Life and career ==
Born James Stewart Marcus, he was the grandson of Joseph S. Marcus who founded the Bank of United States. Raised in New York City, Marcus graduated from Harvard University with a B.A. in 1951 and earned an M.B.A. from the Harvard Business School in 1953. In 1951, he was editor of The Harvard Crimson. In 1956, he joined the firm of Goldman Sachs and was a general partner there from 1964 to 1982.

In 1973, Marcus was named a member of the Board of Directors of the Metropolitan Opera, and later served as chairman of the Board of Directors of the Met from 1986 to 1993. In 1997, he was elected an honorary director of the Met Board. In 2010, he gave ten million dollars to the Juilliard School to establish the Ellen and James S. Marcus Institute for Vocal Arts. He was also a longtime generous supporter of WQXR-FM.

Marcus was a trustee of numerous organizations, including the American Composers Orchestra, the Animal Medical Center of New York, the Calamus Foundation, the Cathedral of St. John the Divine, the Collegiate Chorale, the Guild Hall Center for the Performing Arts, Lenox Hill Hospital, the Lincoln Center for the Performing Arts, the Manhattan Theatre Club, and WNET. He died in Manhattan in 2015.
