= Lenox Hill (TV series) =

2020 documentary television series

- Genre: Documentary
- Developed by: Ruthie Shatz; Adi Barash
- Composer: Uri Frost
- Country of origin: United States
- Original language: English
- No. of seasons: 1
- No. of episodes: 9

Production
- Executive producers: Ruthie Shatz; Adi Barash; Josh Braun
- Cinematography: Adi Barash; Bryant Fisher
- Editors: Ruthie Shatz; Helen Yum; Akiko Iwakawa-Grieve
- Running time: 48–53 minutes
- Production companies: Netflix Studios; Yulari Films

Original release
- Network: Netflix
- Release: June 10, 2020

Lenox Hill is a documentary television series developed by Ruthie Shatz and Adi Barash, which premiered on Netflix on June 10, 2020. The premise mainly revolves around the lives of four medical professionals in the areas of neurosurgery, emergency medicine, and obstetrics and gynecology at the Lenox Hill Hospital.

== Release ==
Lenox Hill was released on June 10, 2020, on Netflix.

== Participants ==
- David Langer: Chair of award-winning Neurosurgery department
- John Boockvar: Vice Chair of Neurosurgery
- Mirtha Macri: Emergency Physician
- Amanda Little-Richardson: Chief OB-GYN resident in her last year. She gives birth in the "Full Circle" episode.

== Episodes ==
No.	Title	Directed by	Original release date
1	"Growth Hurts"	Adi Barash; Ruthie Shatz	June 10, 2020
2	"The Barrier"	Adi Barash; Ruthie Shatz	June 10, 2020
3	"Birth"	Adi Barash; Ruthie Shatz	June 10, 2020
4	"Together"	Adi Barash; Ruthie Shatz	June 10, 2020
5	"Undercurrents"	Adi Barash; Ruthie Shatz	June 10, 2020
6	"Night of the Dead"	Adi Barash; Ruthie Shatz	June 10, 2020
7	"Pain"	Adi Barash; Ruthie Shatz	June 10, 2020
8	"Full Circle"	Adi Barash; Ruthie Shatz	June 10, 2020
9	"Pandemic"	Adi Barash; Ruthie Shatz	June 24, 2020
Special episode covering the March 9 to May 20, 2020 period of the COVID-19 pandemic.

== Reception ==
On review aggregator Rotten Tomatoes, the series holds an approval rating of 100% based on 15 critic reviews with an average rating of 8/10. The website's critical consensus reads, "An intimate portrait of medical professionals that explores triumphs and complications in equal measure, Lenox Hill is as engrossing as it is eye opening." On Metacritic, it has a weighted average score of 87 out of 100 based on 8 reviews, indicating "universal acclaim".

Daniel Fienberg of The Hollywood Reporter gave a review stating," Lenox Hill aims to inspire, and the eight-episode first season ends up more emotionally nourishing than intellectually satisfying—not that there's anything necessarily wrong with that." Daniel D'Addario at Variety said, "With an openhearted curiosity about its subjects and a patient, clear eye, the series comes to no conclusions about the way we administer medical care now, but leaves its viewer with ample information to draw his or her own."

In its 'Best of 2020' reviews the New York Times included Lenox Hill in it list of 'Best Shows Ending in 2020.' The Times critics called it "a riveting narrative and a modern wisdom text about the ebbs and flows of life and loss."
