= Northwell Greenwich Village Hospital =

Building in Manhattan, New York

Coordinates: 40.7377°N 74.0008°W

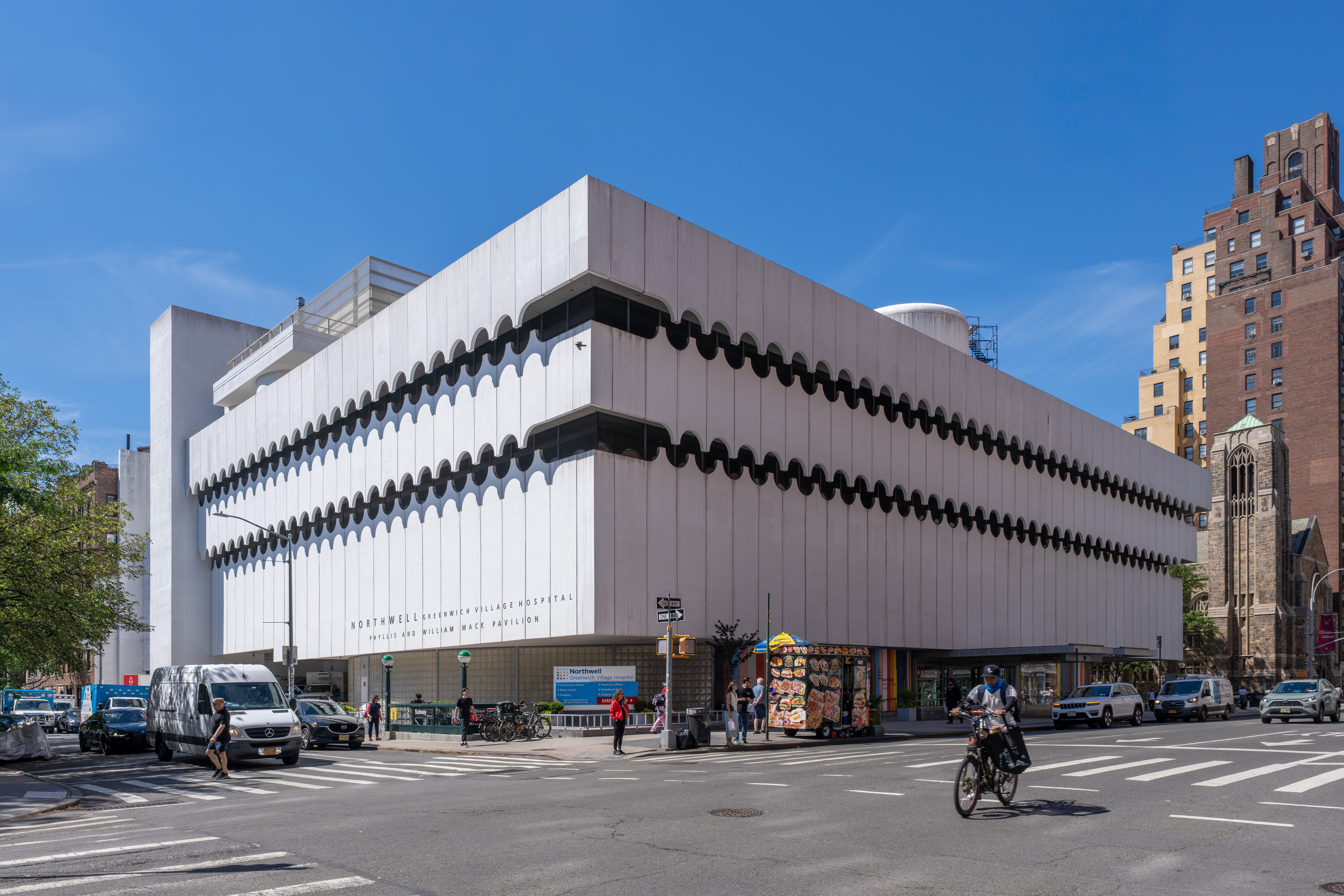
The building in 2026

Northwell Greenwich Village Hospital (formerly Lenox Health Greenwich Village) is a hospital in Greenwich Village, Manhattan, New York City. A division of Lenox Hill Hospital, it was originally built in 1964 as the headquarters of the National Maritime Union, and was later used as a hospital building by Saint Vincent's Hospital and then Northwell Health.

The building is in the Greenwich Village Historic District.

== Architecture ==
The building's architecture reflects its original use as the headquarters of the National Maritime Union. Albert C. Ledner was the architect. It was one of three buildings in Lower Manhattan designed by Ledner for the organization; one of the others is now the Maritime Hotel.

Exterior features include a white façade with windows resembling portholes, scalloped overhangs, and an elevator penthouse resembling a steamship smokestack, together being reminiscent of an ocean liner. Upon its opening, it was noted for its deviation from the glass-box Modernist architecture popular at the time. In 1966, ceramic tiles were applied to the building's exterior, which were removed in the 2014–2016 renovation. National Maritime Union President Joseph Curran approvingly called the building "the box in which the Guggenheim Museum came."

Its interior design reflects the theme of maritime vessels and circular shapes. The ground floor has two circular spaces originally used as hiring floors, featuring glass brick exteriors, and the rest of the building was designed to appear to be floating above them. Their double-height ceilings were later removed and replaced with spaces for outpatient clinics and offices, but they were restored in the 2014–2016 renovation.

== History ==
The building was originally built in 1964, and was called the Joseph Curran Building.

It was sold in 1974 and became the Edward and Theresa O'Toole Medical Services Building, part of Saint Vincent's Hospital. In 2008, Saint Vincent's Hospital received permission to demolish the building, despite its historic significance, and construct a new hospital tower that would replace its old main building a block away. However, this did not actually occur.

Saint Vincent's Hospital abruptly closed in 2010, and that year the O'Toole Building was taken over by Lenox Hill Hospital. Lenox Hill Hospital later that year became part of North Shore-LIJ Health System, now named Northwell Health. It was renovated into a 24-hour emergency care facility known as the Phyllis and William Mack Pavilion, and reopened in 2014 as Lenox Hill HealthPlex. The renovation architect was Perkins Eastman. A challenge during the renovation was to adapt the traditional orthogonal layout of an emergency room to the circular footprint of the ground floor.

In 2015, Lenox Hill HealthPlex was renamed Lenox Health Greenwich Village.

In 2025, Northwell Health announced a $32 million expansion that added nearly 16,000 square feet of hospital space, including an eight-bed medical surgical unit and a cardiac catheterization lab. As part of the expansion, the facility was renamed from Lenox Health Greenwich Village to Northwell Greenwich Village Hospital.
