= Lenox Hill Hospital =

Hospital in Manhattan, New York

- Northwell Health

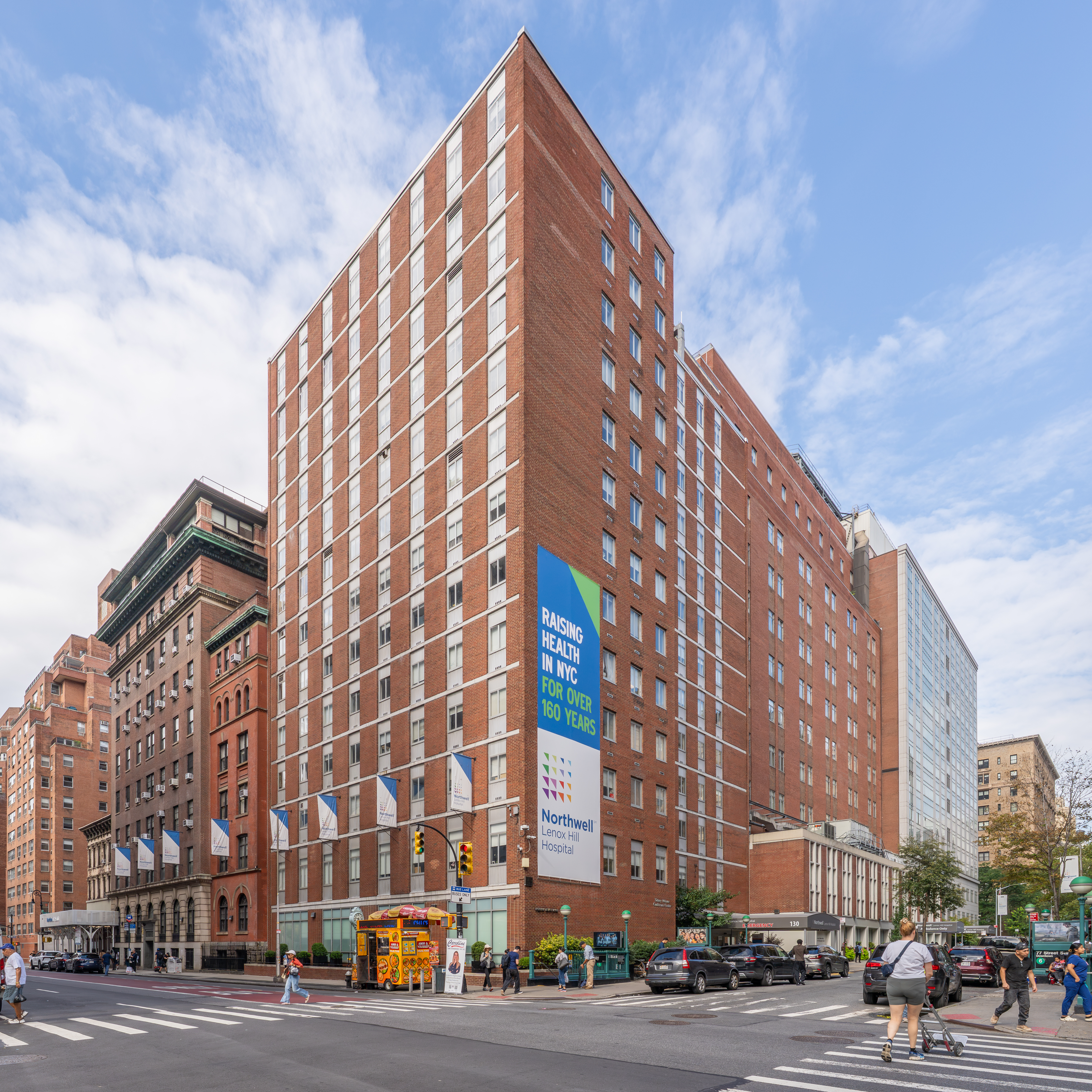
- Lexington Avenue and East 77th Street

Geography
- Location: 100 East 77th Street, Manhattan, New York City, New York, United States
- Coordinates: 40.7736°N 73.9609°W

Organization
- Care system: Private
- Type: Teaching
- Affiliated university: Hofstra Northwell School of Medicine

Services
- Emergency department: Yes
- Beds: 450

History
- Founded: 1857

Links
- Website: northwell.edu/lenoxhill
- Lists: Hospitals in New York State
- Other links: Hospitals in Manhattan

Lenox Hill Hospital (LHH) is a nationally ranked, 450-bed, non-profit, tertiary, research and academic medical center located on the Upper East Side of Manhattan in New York City, servicing the tri-state area. LHH is one of the region's many university-level academic medical centers. The hospital is owned by Northwell Health, the largest private employer in the state of New York. LHH serves as a clinical campus for the Zucker School of Medicine, which is owned by the health system in a partnership with Hofstra University.

It was founded in 1857 as the German Dispensary. It currently consists of ten buildings and has occupied the present site in Manhattan since 1869, when it was known as the German Hospital. In 2007, the Manhattan Eye, Ear and Throat Hospital was incorporated into Lenox Hill Hospital.

The hospital is located on a city block bounded on the north and south by East 77th and 76th Streets, and on the west and east by Park Avenue and Lexington Avenue.

== History ==
=== 19th century ===
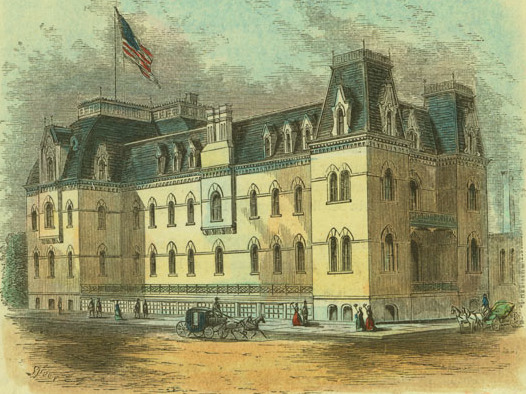
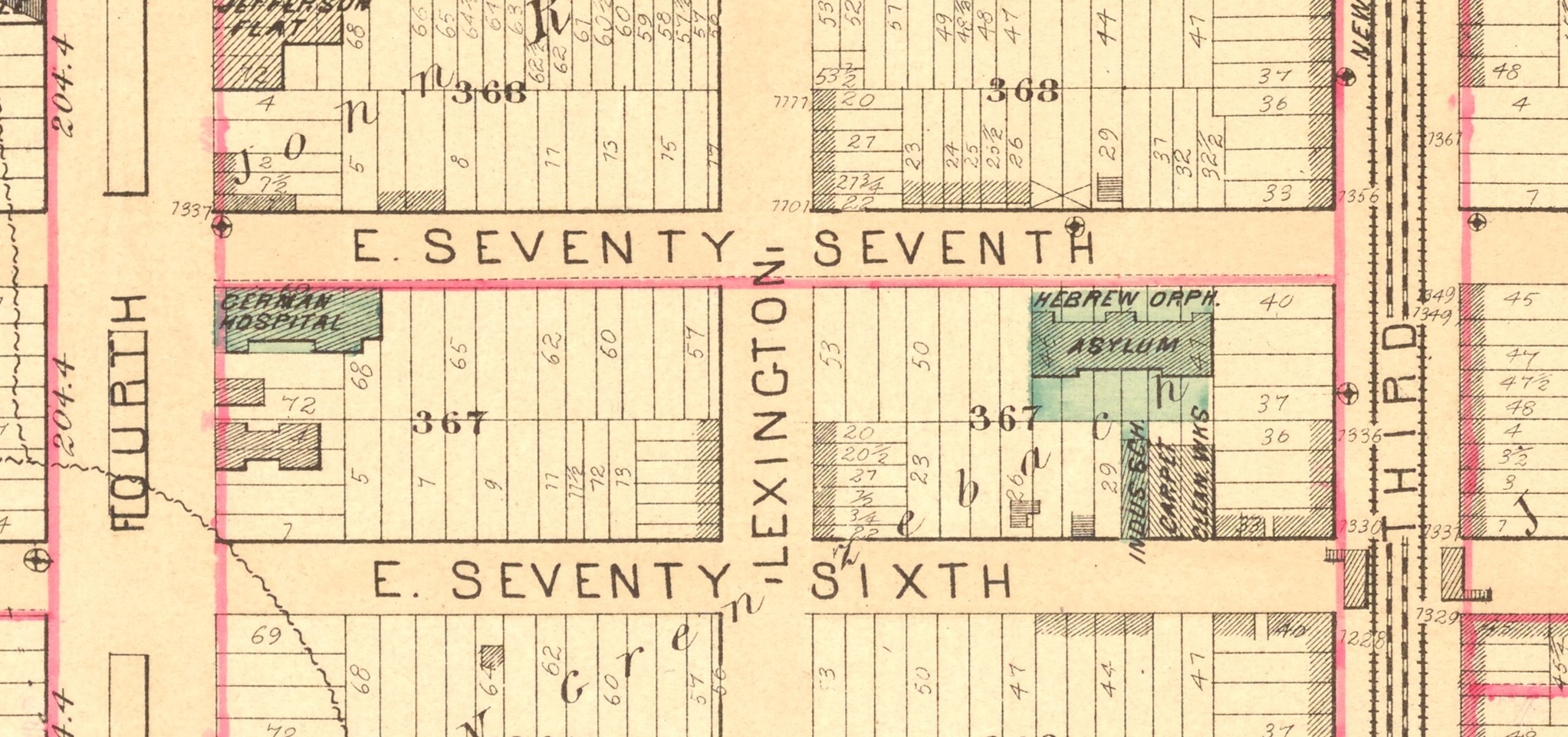
Top, the German Hospital illustrated in 1868, when it was still under construction; bottom, map published in 1879

Detail from a map of New York City in 1852. Number 210 Walker Street is on the north side, between Chrystie and Forsyth Streets, which are parallel to Mott Street and three and four blocks to the right. The building no longer exists.

In 1857, a group of community leaders recognized the need for medical services among the immigrant community and founded the German Dispensary. Physicians, Ernest Krackowizer and Abraham Jacobi, were among the founders. Its purpose, according to the constitution adopted January 19, 1857, was "to give medical advice in their own tongue to inhabitants of New York City who speak the German language, a great many indigent sick persons, ignorant of the English tongue." On May 28, 1857, the dispensary opened at 132 New Canal Street. The location had been 210 Walker Street before the street's renaming. In 1862, the dispensary moved to larger quarters at 8 East 3rd Street.

The German Hospital of the City of New York was incorporated by the New York State Legislature on April 13, 1861, and its first board of directors was organized on February 15, 1862. A plot of ground situated on Park Avenue and 77th Street was leased to the hospital by the city for 50 years at a nominal rent, and it purchased six additional lots on 76th Street. The plan was to erect two pavilions, extending along 77th Street, from Park to Lexington Avenues, with an administration building between them. The corner-stone of the western pavilion was laid on September 3, 1866. Completion was delayed by a shortage of funds, and the hospital opened on September 13, 1869. On March 26, 1866, the state legislature made the German Dispensary a branch of the German Hospital.

A pavilion for skin diseases opened in 1875, an isolation pavilion in 1880, a women's department in 1882, and a new dispensary in 1884. The new dispensary was located at 137 Second Avenue, between 8th and 9th Streets. The three-story building was a gift of Anna Ottendorfer and Oswald Ottendorfer, who ran the German-language newspaper, New Yorker Staats-Zeitung.

Most of the patients treated at the hospital were from the local Little Germany neighborhood around First and Second Avenues below 14th Street.

A new wing opened in 1888, and a nurses' home opened in 1893, donated by the Ottendorfer family. A five-story training school for nurses was added in February 1894 at 77th Street and Lexington Avenue, with four young German-American women forming the first class. Until then, nursing attendants and charge nurses had been brought over from Germany. The New York Times noted in an 1899 editorial, "to be a graduate nurse of the German Hospital is a distinction and recommendation for good nursing." A hospital annex, at the corner of 77th Street and Lexington Avenue, also donated by the Ottendorfer family, opened in 1901.

The hospital moved to the 77th Street location entirely in 1905, about the same time that Manhattan's German community was increasingly abandoning Little Germany for the Yorkville neighborhood, within walking distance of the new hospital. New York City deeded to the hospital the square block it occupied for $5,000 in 1907. The dispensary building was sold in 1906 to the German Polyklinik, founded in 1883 – which later changed its name to Stuyvesant Polyclinic Hospital – for $82,000, and a larger dispensary was erected on the northeast corner of 76th Street and Park Avenue, with Ottendorfer's son and daughter providing the balance of the $250,000 cost, in their mother's memory.

The new dispensary building was opened on March 16, 1907. In 1908, a new isolation pavilion was inaugurated, as well as a pavilion for tuberculosis patients. In 1910, a separate building for intrathoracic surgery was begun on Lexington Avenue, adjoining the German Hospital Training School for Nurses. Ottendorfer's daughter donated $100,000 for the creation of the Abraham Jacobi Division for Children. The capacity of the German Hospital in 1915 was 310 beds.

=== 20th century ===
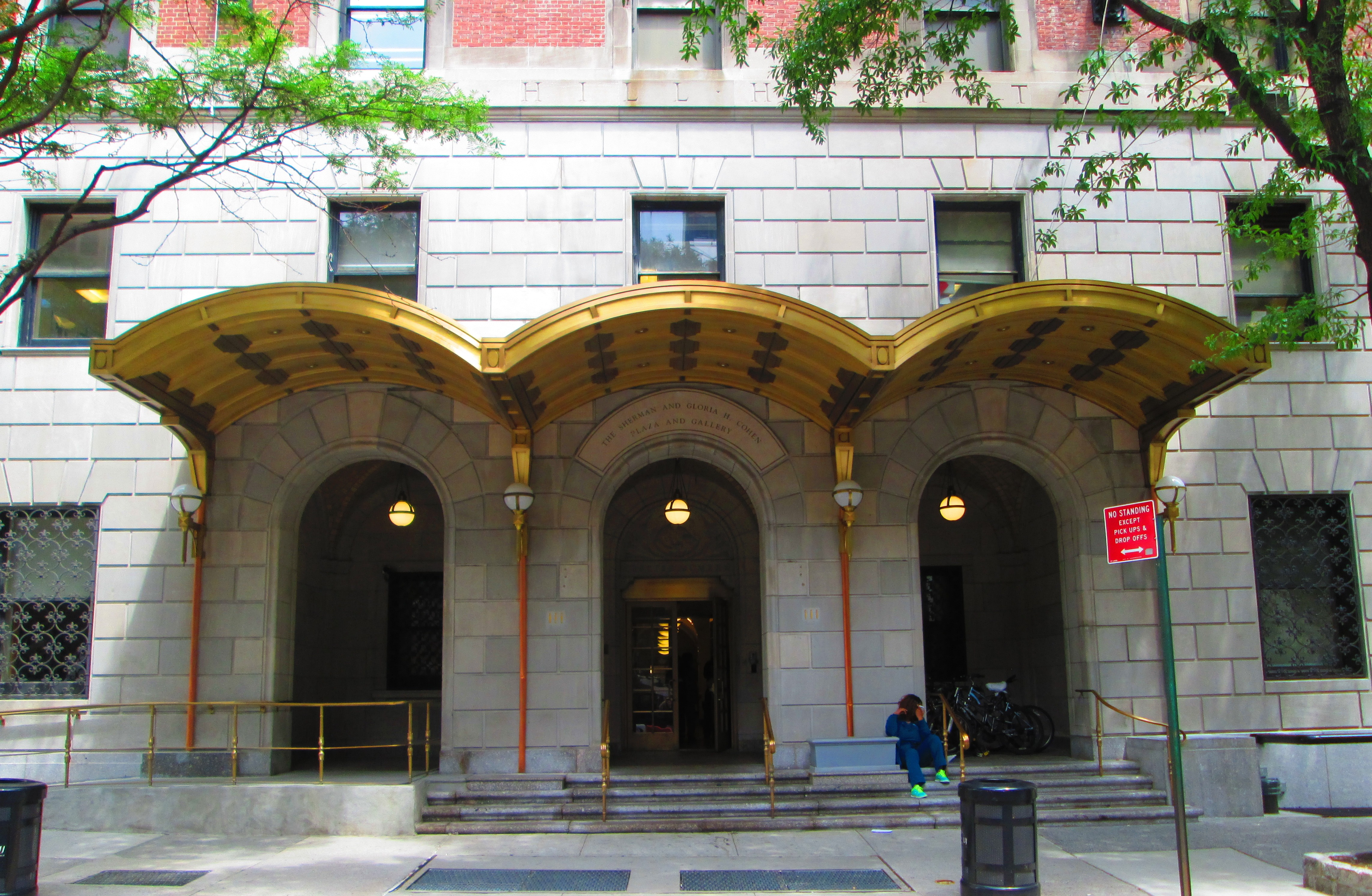
The entrance to the Sherman and Gloria H. Cohen Plaza and Gallery at 125 East 76th Street

In July 1918, the German Hospital was renamed Lenox Hill Hospital, tying it to the Lenox Hill section of the Upper East Side, in an effort to distance the institution from America's enemy in World War I. A movement in 1925 to restore the hospital to its former name, to appeal to potential donors of German descent, was eventually rejected by the board of trustees. It was said at the time that about 95 percent of the doctors, nurses, and other employees of the hospital spoke German.

The hospital rejected a proposed merger with Columbia University in February 1919.

In April 1931, the hospital completed a new $2.5 million, 11-story building, with a facade made of light brick with limestone trim, on the 76th Street side of the hospital. The new building replaced two apartment houses and several workshops. In December 1931, Winston Churchill was hospitalized there for treatment of injuries suffered when he was hit by a car after failing to look left when crossing Fifth Avenue. The pioneering children's division, founded by Dr. Abraham Jacobi, was housed on the 11th floor, with other patient rooms on the 4th through 9th floors, and operating rooms on the 10th floor. Another two-story building, containing a ward service, lecture hall, and swimming pool, was added next to the main building on the 76th Street side in 1936, at a cost of $150,000.

By 1939, the hospital had annually treated 12,115 patients with bed care, and another 23,099 visited the dispensary for treatment. Adding accident room patients, the hospital treated over 53,000 people in 1939. Because some care was given for free or part-pay, the hospital often ran an operating deficit, just as it did in 1939, when it lost $163,029, down a loss of over $200,000 the previous year, in 1938. The hospital's operating loss grew to $284,692 in 1945, which was then a record high. Due to a lack of funds, an anticipated additional new building was delayed for over 20 years, when the Second Century Development Program, designed to raise $10 million, was led by the hospital's president, James Wickersham.

In 1957, on the hospital's 100th anniversary, it opened a $4.5 million, 12-story building on Park Avenue at 77th Street, with a glass and aluminum facade, and a capacity of 180 patient beds. The new building, named the Wollman Pavilion, also housed a mental health unit, and an entire floor was allocated for research on speech and hearing disorders, epilepsy, and hemophilia. In 1964, the Charles R. Lachman Community Health Center was added on the south side of 77th Street, between the Wollman Pavilion and the William Black Hall of Nursing, which opened in 1962 (the School of Nursing closed in 1973). The hospital opened its largest building, 12 stories tall, in 1976, located at Park Avenue and 76th Street, replacing the Ottendorfer Dispensary, at a cost of $20 million. The modern brick masonry structure, with a fortress-like facade, stood in stark contrast in architectural style of the rest of the hospital's buildings. The new building added 180 patient beds for an overall capacity of 690 beds.

In 1943, the hospital sent a medical unit to England to maintain station hospitals for military personnel. Throughout the remainder of World War II, hospital staff members served in all theaters of war, including with combat forces in the European theater of operations after D-Day.

In 1998, a jury awarded $49 million in an obstetrics case against the hospital, which was one of the largest medical malpractice verdicts in New York City history at that time.

=== 21st century ===
The hospital's building underwent masonry and roof restorations, conducted by Merrit Engineering Consultants, P.C., from 2007 to 2009. Façade restoration, waterproofing, and structural steel repairs were also conducted.

On May 19, 2010, the hospital announced that an agreement had been finalized for it to join Northwell Health.

In 2014, the old St. Vincent Hospital building that closed in 2010, became Lenox Hill HealthPlex, Manhattan's first freestanding emergency department. This facility is located at 30 7th Avenue between West 12th and 13th streets. This emergency department sees patients whether they come as a walk-in or via an ambulance.

In 2015, Lenox Hill HealthPlex was renamed Lenox Health Greenwich Village.

In 2020, Netflix released a documentary series, Lenox Hill, which was filmed at the hospital. The series was filmed from 2018 to 2019 and followed four practicing doctors at the Manhattan hospital.

==== Expansion proposal ====
Since 2019, Northwell Health was considering demolishing the Lenox Hill Hospital block and constructing a 30-story building there, nearly doubling the hospital's space to 1.3 million square feet (120,000 m^{2}). The plan included a 436-foot-tall (133 m) tower. Northwell's proposal, particularly the tower, was controversial among neighborhood residents, and a community group was formed to fight the plans. Northwell submitted plans to the New York City Planning Commission in January 2025. That April, the local Manhattan Community Board 8 recommended that the city not enact a zoning change that would allow the tower to proceed. In July 2025, the CPC tentatively approved Northwell Health's plan to spend $2 billion redeveloping the Lenox Hill Hospital site. After Northwell agreed to reduce the tower's height to 370 feet (110 m), the New York City Council approved the scaled-back version of the project that August. As part of the plan, the hospital would be increased to 475 beds, each within their own room. In addition, the new hospital would include a new maternal-care department and an expanded emergency department.

== Significance ==
=== Contributions to modern medicine ===
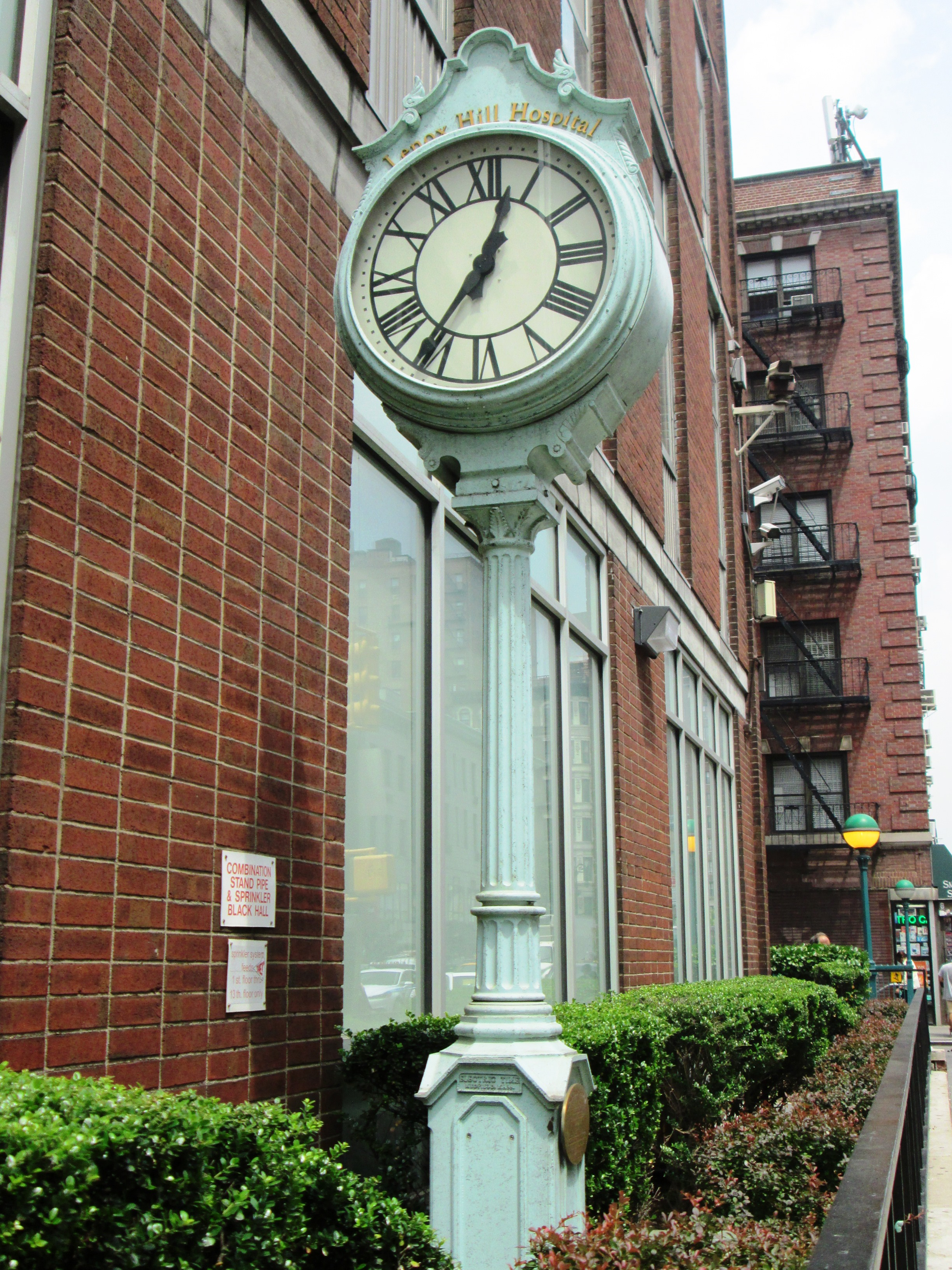
The Lenox Hill Hospital sidewalk clock on Lexington Avenue

The hospital developed and implemented standards and practices that would become valuable components of modern medicine.

In 1897, the hospital installed one of the first X-ray machines in America. Ten years later, the hospital established the first physical therapy department in the country. In response to what was becoming a growing public health threat, it was the first general hospital in the U.S. to open a tuberculosis division. In 1973, the Nicholas Institute of Sports Medicine and Athletic Trauma became the first hospital-based center in the nation for the study of sports medicine.

Early on, the hospital established itself as one of the nation's leading hospitals for cardiac care. In 1938, the first angiocardiograph in the country was performed at the hospital. In 1955, the hospital became one of the first in New York City to open a cardiac catheterization laboratory. Ten years later, the hospital opened the first cardiac-care unit in the metropolitan New York area.

In 1978, the first coronary angioplasties in the country were performed at Lenox Hill Hospital and at St. Mary's Hospital in San Francisco. In 1994, Lenox Hill Hospital surgeons pioneered minimally invasive direct coronary artery bypass surgery. In 2000, the hospital was the first in the U.S. to perform endoscopic radial artery harvesting.

In 2000, Lenox Hill Hospital became the sponsor of Manhattan Eye, Ear and Throat Hospital.

In 2003, the first drug-coated stent approved by the U.S. Food and Drug Administration (FDA) was implanted at the hospital. It is also one of the first hospitals in the nation to acquire a state-of-the-art robotic cardiac system, which allows surgeons to perform minimally invasive heart-bypass surgery.

In 2001, the hospital assembled a disaster team to care for casualties of the September 11 attacks at the World Trade Center. Emergency crews were sent to Ground Zero and supply runs to the area were conducted to aid the rescue workers. The hospital set up a free walk-in Crisis Counseling Center, staffed by the hospital's psychiatrists and therapists, and the blood donor center was expanded to accommodate the thousands of people who came to the hospital to give blood.

In 2007, the hospital celebrated its 150th anniversary, and expanded its dedication to the New York City community by opening a new, state-of-the-art emergency department, the Anne and Isidore Falk Center for Emergency Care at Lenox Hill Hospital.

=== Medical milestones and pioneers ===
Many important milestones in the advancement of medical knowledge have been made at the hospital, including:

- Introduction of antiseptic methods in obstetrics
- Installation of one of the first X-ray machines in America in 1897
- First tuberculosis pavilion in any American hospital
- First hemophilia center
- Introduction of the technique for bone marrow examination in 1931
- Development of the specialty of thoracic surgery
- First successful esophagectomy for carcinoma
- First surgical treatment of undescended testicles
- First angiocardiogram in the United States
- First coronary angioplasty in the United States
- Implantation of the first drug-eluting stent in the United States
- First American hospital to use an operative 3D exoscope in Neurosurgery

Many medical pioneers were early members of the hospital's attending staff. Among them were:

- Henry Jacques Garrigues – introduced antiseptic obstetrics to North America
- Willy Meyer, M.D. – performed some of the earliest pulmonary surgery in America
- Abraham Jacobi, M.D. – the father of American pediatrics
- Leo Buerger, M.D. – described the disease that bears his name
- Carl Eggers, M.D., and Dewitt Stetten, M.D. – founding members of the American College of Surgeons
- Franz Torek, M.D. – performed the first successful esophagectomy for carcinoma and also developed the surgical treatment of undescended testicles
- William H. Stewart, M.D. – a former director of radiology, performed the first angiocardiogram in the United States in 1938.
- Simon Stertzer, M.D. of Lenox Hill Hospital in New York and Richard K. Myler, M.D. of St. Mary's Hospital in San Francisco – performed the first coronary angioplasties in the United States on the same day, March 1, 1978

=== Recognition ===
In 2026, Lenox Hill Hospital was ranked the No. 9 hospital in New York City and #8 in New York State. It was nationally ranked among the nation's top 50 hospitals in six adult specialties including neurology & neurosurgery (#36), orthopedics (#39) and ear, nose & throat (#27), cardiology & heart surgery (#25), pulmonology & lung surgery (#30), urology (#42), and geriatrics (#33) according to U.S. News & World Report's annual survey of America's Best Hospitals.

== Current use ==
Lenox Hill Hospital provides a wide range of inpatient and outpatient medical, surgical, cardiovascular, orthopedic and obstetric services. The hospital has both primary care and specialty outpatient clinics, an ambulance service and an emergency department. Special programs and services include neurosurgery, sports medicine, interventional cardiology and a cardiovascular surgery program, a New York State-designated AIDS center program, a high-risk neonatal care service, an obstetric service, an ambulatory surgery program, a renal dialysis service, and a community health education and outreach program. Other licensed services include cystoscopy, diagnostic radiology services including CT and MRI scanning, nuclear medicine, and therapeutic radiology. Outpatient services include primary care medicine, pediatrics, prenatal care and family planning, physical therapy, audiology, speech/language pathology, and social work. The hospital also provides inpatient and outpatient adult mental health services.

== Notable people ==
=== Faculty ===
- David J. Langer is an American neurosurgeon and the chair of neurosurgery. He is a professor of neurosurgery and radiology at the Zucker School of Medicine. Langer was on the 2020 Netflix docu-series Lenox Hill. which featured the Lenox Hill Neurosurgery Department. Lenox Hill Neurosurgery ranked No. 23 in U.S. News & World Report's Best Hospitals for 2020–2021 as well as #28 in Newsweek's "World's Best Specialized Hospitals" ranking along with the specialties Cardiology and Orthopedics.

=== Notable patient deaths ===
Notable deaths
Name	Occupation, or known for	Death date	Ref
Frank Munsey	newspaper and magazine publisher	1925	
Wendell Willkie	1940 Republican presidential nominee	1944	
Jerry Ross	Lyricist and composer	1955	
Elizabeth Arden	cosmetics pioneer	1966	
Samuel Rosenman	Presidential adviser and speechwriter	1973	
Ed Sullivan	television host	1974	
Nelson Rockefeller	Vice President and New York Governor	1979	
William Steinberg	orchestra conductor	1978	
Will Lee	actor	1982	
Jack Barry	television host	1984	
Jack Mercer	voice actor	1984	
Anne Baxter	stage, TV & film actress	1985	
Charles Collingwood	CBS correspondent	1985	
Theodore H. White	political journalist	1986	
Marilyn Klinghoffer	cruise ship terror victim	1986	
Donald S. Klopfer	Random House co-founder	1986	
Lanny Ross	actor/singer	1988	
Alvin Ailey	modern dancer	1989	
Diana Vreeland	fashion editor	1989	
John F.X. Condon	Boxing promoter and sports announcer	1989	
Ron Bottcher	opera singer	1991	
Allan Jones	actor/singer	1992	
Fred Robbins	radio and TV host	1992	
Myrna Loy	actress	1993	
Tatiana Troyanos	classical music, opera singer	1993	
Erick Hawkins	choreographer	1994	
Simon Rifkind	lawyer	1995	
Roger Grimsby	New York TV news host	1995	
Alger Hiss	alleged Soviet spy	1996	
Robert Sarnoff	RCA chairman	1997	
Malachi Martin	writer	1999	
Leon Hess	oil tycoon and New York Jets owner	1999	
William H. Whyte	writer	1999	
Sylvia Sidney	actress	1999	
Jim Jensen	New York TV news anchorman	1999	
Gus Hall	U.S. Communist Party perennial presidential candidate	2000	
Jean MacArthur	General Douglas MacArthur's wife	2000	
Alexander H. Cohen	theatrical producer	2000	
Dick Schaap	television sports journalist	2001	
Marty Glickman	sports announcer	2001	
Herbert Ross	film director	2001	
Kathleen Ankers	scenic designer	2001	
Kathleen Freeman	actress	2001	
Olivia Goldsmith	novelist	2004	
Roger Williams Straus Jr.	book publisher	2004	
Nipsey Russell	comedian	2005	
Bertram L. Podell	congressman	2005	
Ryan Shay	marathon runner	2007	
Natasha Richardson	actress	2009	
Frankie Manning	dancer and choreographer	2009	
Mitch Miller	television sing-along host	2010	
Louis Auchincloss	writer	2010	
Elaine Kaufman	restaurateur	2010	
George Shearing	composer/musician	2011	
Tony Musante	actor	2013	
Bob Belden	musician	2015	
James S. Marcus	Metropolitan Opera chairman and Goldman Sachs partner	2015	
Sanford Socolow	CBS News executive	2015	
Lillian Ross	journalist and author	2017	
Ruth Finley	founder of The Fashion Calendar and industry leader	2018	
Ray Price	Presidential speechwriter	2019	
Robert Morgenthau	Manhattan District Attorney	2019	
Leon Wildes	lawyer for John Lennon & Yoko Ono	2024	
Renauld White	actor	2024	

== See also ==
- Lenox Hill (TV series)
- List of hospitals in New York City
