= List of university hospitals =

A university hospital is an institution which combines the services of a hospital with the education of medical students and medical research. These hospitals are typically affiliated with a medical school or university. The following is a list of such hospitals. See also Category:Teaching hospitals by country

== Algeria ==
The Algerian Ministry of Health, Population and Hospital Reform maintains 15 public university teaching hospital centers (French: Centre Hospitalo-Universitaire or CHU) with 13,755 beds and one public university hospital (EHU) with 773 beds.

- CHU Mustapha Pacha in Algiers Province, established in 1854
- CHU Lamine Debaghine in Algiers Province
- CHU Nafissa Hamoud in Algiers Province
- CHU Issad Hassani in Algiers Province
- CHU Ibn Sina Anaba in Annaba Province
- CHU Dorban in Annaba Province
- CHU Hospital of Mother and Child El Bouni in Annaba Province
- CHU Sainte Thérèse in Annaba Province
- CHU Annaba Anti-Cancer Center in Annaba Province
- CHU Béjaïa in Béjaïa Province
- CHU Blida in Blida Province
- CHU Hassid Ben Bouali in Blida Province
- CHU Abdelhamid Ben Badis in Constantine Province
- CHU Baloguat University in Laghouat Province
- CHU Saadna Abdenour Sétif in Sétif Province
- CHU Dr Hassani Abdelkader in Sidi Bel Abbès Province
- CHU Tlemcen in Tlemcen Province

== Argentina ==
- Hospital de Clínicas "José de San Martín" of the University of Buenos Aires, Buenos Aires
- Hospital Universitario Austral of the Austral University, Buenos Aires
- Hospital Municipal De Moron "Ostaciana B. De Lavignolle", of the University of Buenos Aires
- Hospital Dr. Narciso Lopez De Lanus, of the University of Buenos Aires
- Hospital Laferrere, of the University of Buenos Aires
- Hospital Municipal Mendez, of the University of Buenos Aires
- Hospital MUÑIZ, of the University of Buenos Aires
- Hospital San Miguel, of the University of Buenos Aires
- Hospital Tornu, of the University of Buenos Aires
- Idim A Lanari, of the University of Buenos Aires
- Instituto De Oncologia Roffo, of the University of Buenos Aires
- Baldomero Sommer, of the University of Buenos Aires
- Hospital Municipal "Dr. Eduardo Wilde", of the University of Buenos Aires
- Hospital Ciudad de Boulogne, of the University of Buenos Aires
- Hospital Italiano de Buenos Aires, of the Instituto Universitario del Hospital Italiano

== Australia ==
=== Australian Capital Territory ===
- Canberra Hospital, Canberra – Australian National University Medical School
- National Capital Private Hospital, Garran – Australian National University Medical School
- Calvary Hospital, Canberra – Australian National University Medical School
- Calvary John James Hospital, Deakin – Australian National University Medical School
- Calvary Private Hospital, Bruce – Australian National University Medical School
- Canberra Eye Hospital, Symonston – Australian National University Medical School
- University of Canberra Hospital, Bruce – University of Canberra

=== New South Wales ===
- Armidale Regional Hospital – Armidale – University of New South Wales Faculty of Medicine
- Batemans Bay Hospital, Batemans Bay – Australian National University Medical School
- Bega District Hospital, Bega – Australian National University Medical School
- Bega Valley Private Hospital, Bega – Australian National University Medical School
- Sapphire Coast Medical Practice at Bega and Tathra – Australian National University Medical School
- Blacktown Hospital, Blacktown – University of Sydney & Western Sydney University
- Camden and Campbelltown Hospitals (Campbelltown, Camden, Sydney) – Western Sydney University
- Cessnock District Hospital – Cessnock – University of New South Wales Faculty of Medicine
- Dubbo Base Hospital and Orange Base Hospital, Dubbo – Sydney Medical School
- Glen Innes District Hospital – Glen Innes- University of New South Wales Faculty of Medicine
- Gloucester Soldiers' Memorial Hospital- Gloucester – University of New South Wales Faculty of Medicine
- Gosford Hospital, Gosford – University of Newcastle, University of New England
- Goulburn Base Hospital, Goulburn – Australian National University Medical School
- Katungal Aboriginal Medical Service – Australian National University Medical School
- Kenmore Hospital, Goulburn – Australian National University Medical School
- St John of God Hospital, Goulburn – Australian National University Medical School
- Chisholm Ross Centre, Goulburn – Australian National University Medical School
- Gunnedah District Hospital – Gunnedah – University of New South Wales Faculty of Medicine
- Hornsby Ku-ring-gai Hospital, Hornsby – University of Sydney
- Inverell District Hospital- Inverell – University of New South Wales Faculty of Medicine
- Nepean Hospital, Kingswood(suburb of Sydney) – Sydney Medical School
- Liverpool Hospital, Liverpool – University of New South Wales & Western Sydney University
- Maitland Hospital- Maitland – University of New South Wales Faculty of Medicine
- Sapphire Clinic, Merimbula
- Moree District Hospital – Moree – University of New South Wales Faculty of Medicine
- Moruya Hospital, Moruya
- Muswellbrook District Hospital- Muswellbrook – University of New South Wales Faculty of Medicine
- Nelson Bay and District Polyclinic – Nelson Bay – University of New South Wales Faculty of Medicine
- Newcastle Mater Misericordiae Hospital – Newcastle – University of New South Wales Faculty of Medicine
- John Hunter Hospital – Newcastle – University of New South Wales Faculty of Medicine
- Orange Health Service, Orange – University of Sydney
- Pambula Hospital, Pambula
- Scott Memorial Hospital – Scone – University of New South Wales Faculty of Medicine
- Shoalhaven District Memorial Hospital, Nowra – University of Wollongong and University of New South Wales
- Singleton District Hospital – Singleton – University of New South Wales Faculty of Medicine
- Macquarie University Hospital, Sydney – Macquarie University Australian School of Advanced Medicine
- Prince of Wales Hospital (Sydney) – University of New South Wales
- Royal Prince Alfred Hospital, Sydney – Sydney Medical School
- Westmead Hospital, Sydney – Sydney Medical School
- Royal Alexandra Hospital for Children, Sydney – Sydney Medical School
- Concord Repatriation General Hospital, Sydney – Sydney Medical School
- Royal North Shore Hospital, Sydney – Sydney Medical School
- Royal Hospital for Women, Sydney – University of Sydney, University of New South Wales
- Royal Prince Alfred Hospital, Sydney – University of Sydney
- St George Hospital (Sydney) – University of New South Wales
- St Vincent's Hospital, Sydney – University of New South Wales
- Sydney Adventist Hospital, Sydney – Sydney Medical School
- Sydney Children's Hospital, Sydney – University of New South Wales
- Sydney Dental Hospital, Sydney – University of Sydney
- Manning Base Hospital – Taree – University of New South Wales Faculty of Medicine
- Tamworth Base Hospital – Tamworth – University of New South Wales Faculty of Medicine
- Prince Albert Memorial Hospital – Tenterfield – University of New South Wales Faculty of Medicine
- Wollongong Hospital, Wollongong – University of Wollongong

=== Northern Territory ===
- Royal Darwin Hospital, Tiwi – Flinders University, Charles Darwin University & University of Sydney

=== Queensland ===
- Mater Health Services, Brisbane
- Princess Alexandra Hospital, Brisbane – University of Queensland
- Royal Brisbane & Women's Hospital – University of Queensland
- St Vincent's Hospital (Brisbane)
- The Prince Charles Hospital, Brisbane
- Wesley Hospital (Brisbane)
- Robina Hospital, Gold Coast – Bond University and Griffith University
- Greenslopes Private Hospital, Greenslopes
- Sunshine Coast University Hospital, Kawana Waters – University of the Sunshine Coast
- Gold Coast University Hospital, Southport – Bond University Faculty of Health Sciences and Medicine and Griffith University School of Medicine
- Townsville Hospital, Townsville – James Cook University

=== South Australia ===
- Lyell McEwin Hospital, Adelaide – University of Adelaide and University of South Australia
- Royal Adelaide Hospital, Adelaide – University of Adelaide
- The Queen Elizabeth Hospital, Adelaide – University of Adelaide
- Women's and Children's Hospital, North Adelaide – University of Adelaide, University of South Australia and Flinders University
- Flinders Medical Centre, Bedford Park

=== Tasmania ===
- Launceston General Hospital, Launceston – University of Tasmania Faculty of Health Sciences

=== Victoria ===
- Royal Victorian Eye and Ear Hospital, East Melbourne – University of Melbourne & La Trobe University
- Frankston Hospital, Frankston – Monash University, Deakin University
- Austin Hospital, Melbourne – Monash University, Deakin University, Swinburne University of Technology, Victoria University of Technology and the Australian Catholic University
- Box Hill Hospital, Melbourne – Monash University, La Trobe University, Deakin University
- Mercy Hospital for Women, Melbourne – University of Melbourne
- Monash Children's Hospital, Melbourne
- Monash Medical Centre, Melbourne
- Royal Children's Hospital – University of Melbourne
- Royal Melbourne Hospital – University of Melbourne School of Medicine
- Royal Women's Hospital, Melbourne – University of Melbourne and La Trobe University
- St Vincent's Hospital, Melbourne – The University of Melbourne
- The Alfred Hospital, Melbourne – Monash University
- University Hospital Geelong, Geelong – Deakin University

=== Western Australia ===
- Fiona Stanley Hospital, Murdoch
- Fremantle Hospital, Fremantle
- Sir Charles Gairdner Hospital, Nedlands
- Graylands Hospital, Perth
- Royal Perth Hospital, Perth
- King Edward Memorial Hospital for Women, Subiaco
- Princess Margaret Hospital for Children, Subiaco

== Austria ==
Lower Austria

- Karl Landsteiner Private University of Health sciences Sankt Pölten – Karl Landsteiner Private University of Health sciences
- Landesklinikum Krems, Krems an der Donau – Karl Landsteiner Private University of Health sciences
- Landesklinikum Tulln, Tulln an der Donau – Karl Landsteiner Private University of Health sciences

Salzburg

- Landesklinik St. Veit /Pongau – Lehrkrankenhaus der PMU, Sankt Veit im Pongau – Paracelsus Private Medical University of Salzburg
- Universitätskliniken Salzburg – Paracelsus Private Medical University of Salzburg
- Christian-Doppler-Klinik Salzburg – Paracelsus Private Medical University of Salzburg

Styria

- LKH-Universitätsklinikum Graz – Medical University of Graz

Tyrol

- Universitätsklinik Innsbruck – Innsbruck Medical University

Upper Austria

- AKH Linz – Medical Faculty at Johannes Kepler University Linz
- Wagner-Jauregg-Nervenklinik, Linz – Medical Faculty at Johannes Kepler University Linz

Vienna

- Vienna General Hospital, Vienna – Medical University of Vienna
- Krankenhaus der Barmherzigen Brüder Wien, Vienna – Medical University of Vienna

== Belgium ==
- University Hospital Antwerpen, in Antwerp
- Cliniques Universitaires Saint-Luc, university hospital of UCLouvain in Woluwe-Saint-Lambert, Brussels
- UZ Brussel, university hospital of the Vrije Universiteit Brussel in Jette, Brussels
- Hospitals and clinics associated with the Université libre de Bruxelles (ULB):
  - Brugmann Hospital, Brussels
  - Clinique César De Paepe, Brussels
  - Erasmus Hospital in Anderlecht, Brussels
  - Hôpital Universitaire Des Enfants Reine Fabiola, Laeken, Brussels
  - Institut Jules Bordet, Brussels
  - Saint-Pierre University Hospital, Brussels
- Ghent University Hospital in Ghent, East Flanders
- UZ Leuven, university hospital of KU Leuven in Flemish Brabant
- Hospitalier Universitaire de Charleroi in Charleroi
- Centre Hospitalier Universitaire Ambroise Paré in Mons
- Centre Hospitalier Universitaire Tivoli in La Louvière
- University Hospital Liège in Liège
- Centre Hospitalier Universitaire de Namur in Salzinnes (Namur), Mont-Godinne and Dinant

== Brazil ==
- Federal University of Brasília, University Hospital of Brasília, HUB, Brasília, Federal District
- Hospital of Base, Hospital de Base, HB, University Hospital, Brasília, Federal District
- Armed Forces Hospital, Hospital das Forças Armadas, HFA, University Hospital, Brasília, Federal District
- Federal University of São Paulo, São Paulo Hospital, São Paulo
- Clinics Hospital of the State University of Campinas, Campinas
- University of São Paulo, School of Medicine Clinics Hospital, São Paulo
- University of São Paulo, School of Medicine at Ribeirao Preto's Clinics Hospital, Ribeirão Preto
- Hospital de Clínicas de Porto Alegre, School of Medicine at the Federal University of Rio Grande do Sul, Porto Alegre, Rio Grande do Sul
- Hospital São Lucas, Pontifical Catholic University of Rio Grande do Sul, Porto Alegre, Rio Grande do Sul
- Federal University of Santa Catarina, Hospital Universitário Polydoro Ernani de São Thiago, Florianópolis, Santa Catarina

== Canada ==
=== Alberta ===
- Alberta Children's Hospital, Calgary, Alberta – University of Calgary Faculty of Medicine
- Foothills Hospital, Calgary, Alberta – University of Calgary Faculty of Medicine
  - Arthur J.E. Child Comprehensive Cancer Centre
- Rockyview General Hospital, Calgary, Alberta – University of Calgary Faculty of Medicine
- Peter Lougheed Centre, Calgary, Alberta – University of Calgary Faculty of Medicine
- South Health Campus, Calgary, Alberta – University of Calgary Faculty of Medicine
- Alberta Hospital Edmonton, Edmonton, Alberta – University of Alberta Faculty of Medicine and Dentistry
- Cross Cancer Institute, Edmonton, Alberta – University of Alberta Faculty of Medicine and Dentistry
- Grey Nuns Community Hospital, Edmonton, Alberta – University of Alberta Faculty of Medicine and Dentistry
- Kaye Edmonton Clinic, Edmonton, Alberta – University of Alberta Faculty of Medicine and Dentistry
- Lois Hole Hospital for Women, Edmonton, Alberta – University of Alberta Faculty of Medicine and Dentistry
- Misericordia Community Hospital, Edmonton, Alberta – University of Alberta Faculty of Medicine and Dentistry
- Royal Alexandra Hospital, Edmonton, Alberta – University of Alberta Faculty of Medicine and Dentistry
- University of Alberta Hospital, Edmonton, Alberta – University of Alberta Faculty of Medicine and Dentistry
  - Stollery Children's Hospital
- Queen Elizabeth II Hospital (Canada), Grande Prairie, Alberta – University of Alberta Faculty of Medicine and Dentistry
- Chinook Regional Hospital, Lethbridge, Alberta – University of Calgary Faculty of Medicine
- Medicine Hat Regional Hospital, Medicine Hat, Alberta - University of Calgary Faculty of Medicine
- Red Deer Regional Hospital, Red Deer, Alberta - University of Alberta Faculty of Medicine and Dentistry

=== British Columbia ===
- Abbotsford Regional Hospital, Abbotsford, British Columbia – University of British Columbia
- Campbell River Hospital, Campbell River, British Columbia – University of British Columbia
- Chilliwack General Hospital, Chilliwack, British Columbia – University of British Columbia
- St Joseph's General Hospital, Comox, British Columbia – University of British Columbia
- Dawson Creek & District Hospital, Dawson Creek, British Columbia – University of British Columbia
- Cowichan District Hospital, Duncan, British Columbia – University of British Columbia
- Fort St. John Hospital, Fort St. John, British Columbia – University of British Columbia
- Royal Inland Hospital, Kamloops, British Columbia – University of British Columbia
- Kelowna General Hospital, Kelowna, British Columbia – University of British Columbia
- Nanaimo Regional General Hospital, Nanaimo, British Columbia – University of British Columbia
- Royal Columbian Hospital, New Westminster, British Columbia – University of British Columbia
- Lions Gate Hospital, North Vancouver, British Columbia
- Penticton Regional Hospital, Penticton, British Columbia – University of British Columbia
- University Hospital of Northern British Columbia, Prince George, British Columbia – University of British Columbia
- Richmond Hospital, Richmond, British Columbia – University of British Columbia
- Surrey Memorial Hospital, Surrey, British Columbia – University of British Columbia
- Terrace Mills Memorial Hospital, Terrace, British Columbia – University of British Columbia
- British Columbia Children's Hospital, Vancouver, British Columbia – University of British Columbia
- British Columbia Women's Hospital & Health Centre, Vancouver, British Columbia – University of British Columbia
- Providence Health Care (Vancouver), Vancouver, British Columbia – University of British Columbia
  - St. Paul's Hospital
  - Mount Saint Joseph Hospital
  - St. Vincent's Hospitals
  - Holy Family Hospital
  - Youville Residence
  - St John Hospice
- Vancouver Hospital and Health Sciences Centre, Vancouver, British Columbia – University of British Columbia
  - Vancouver General Hospital
  - UBC Hospital
- Vernon Jubilee Hospital, Vernon, British Columbia – University of British Columbia
- Royal Jubilee Hospital, Victoria, British Columbia – University of British Columbia
- Victoria General Hospital, Victoria, British Columbia – University of British Columbia

=== Manitoba ===
- Health Sciences Centre (Winnipeg)
  - Winnipeg General Hospital
  - CancerCare Manitoba
  - HSC Winnipeg Children's Hospital
  - PsycHealth Centre
  - Respiratory & Rehabilitation Hospital
  - Women's Hospital (Winnipeg)
- St. Boniface General Hospital (Winnipeg)

=== New Brunswick ===
- Dr. Everett Chalmers Hospital, Fredericton, New Brunswick – Dalhousie University Faculty of Medicine
- Dr. Georges-L.-Dumont University Hospital Centre, Moncton, New Brunswick – Faculté de médecine – Université de Sherbrooke
- Moncton Hospital, Moncton, New Brunswick – Dalhousie University Faculty of Medicine
- Saint John Regional Hospital, Saint John, New Brunswick – Dalhousie University Faculty of Medicine

=== Newfoundland and Labrador ===
- Janeway Children's Health and Rehabilitation Centre, St. John's, NL
- General Hospital, Health Sciences Centre. St. John's, NL

=== Northwest Territories ===
- Stanton Regional Hospital, Yellowknife – partners with University of Calgary and the University of Alberta

=== Nova Scotia ===
- South Shore Regional Hospital, Bridgewater, Nova Scotia – Dalhousie University Faculty of Medicine
- Nova Scotia Hospital, Dartmouth, Nova Scotia – Dalhousie University Faculty of Medicine
- Dartmouth General Hospital, Dartmouth, Nova Scotia – Dalhousie University Faculty of Medicine
- IWK Health Centre, Halifax – Dalhousie University Faculty of Medicine
- Queen Elizabeth II Health Sciences Centre, Halifax – Dalhousie University Faculty of Medicine
- Valley Regional Hospital, Kentville, Nova Scotia – Dalhousie University Faculty of Medicine
- Cobequid Community Health Centre, Lower Sackville, NS – Dalhousie University Faculty of Medicine
- Cape Breton Regional Hospital, Sydney, Nova Scotia – Dalhousie University Faculty of Medicine
- Colchester Regional Hospital, Truro, Nova Scotia – Dalhousie University Faculty of Medicine
- Hants Community Hospital, Windsor, Nova Scotia – Dalhousie University Faculty of Medicine

=== Ontario ===
- South Muskoka Memorial Hospital, Bracebridge, Ontario (Northern Ontario School of Medicine)
- Joseph Brant Hospital, Burlington, Ontario (McMaster University)
- LaVerendrye Hospital, Fort Frances, Ontario (Northern Ontario School of Medicine)
- Hamilton General Hospital, Hamilton, Ontario (McMaster University)
- Juravinski Cancer Centre, Hamilton, Ontario (McMaster University)
- Juravinski Hospital, Hamilton, Ontario (McMaster University)
- McMaster Children's Hospital, Hamilton, Ontario (McMaster University)
- McMaster University Medical Centre, Hamilton, Ontario (McMaster University)
- St. Joseph's Healthcare Hamilton, Hamilton, Ontario (McMaster University)
- St. Peter's Hospital (Hamilton), Hamilton, Ontario (McMaster University)
- Huntsville District Memorial Hospital, Huntsville, Ontario (Northern Ontario School of Medicine)
- Lake of the Woods District Hospital, Kenora, Ontario (Northern Ontario School of Medicine)
- Kingston General Hospital, Kingston, Ontario (Queen's University at Kingston)
- Hotel Dieu Hospital (Kingston, Ontario), Kingston, Ontario (Queen's University at Kingston)
- Providence Continuing Care Centre, Kingston, Ontario (Queen's University at Kingston)
- Grand River Hospital, Kitchener, Ontario (McMaster University)
- St. Mary's General Hospital, Kitchener, Ontario (McMaster University)
- University Hospital (London, Ontario) (University of Western Ontario)
- Victoria Hospital (London, Ontario) (University of Western Ontario)
- Temiskaming Hospital, New Liskeard (Northern Ontario School of Medicine)
- North Bay General Hospital, North Bay, Ontario (Northern Ontario School of Medicine)
- Children's Hospital of Eastern Ontario, Ottawa, Ontario (University of Ottawa)
- Montfort Hospital, Ottawa, Ontario (University of Ottawa)
- Sisters of Charity of Ottawa, Ottawa, Ontario (University of Ottawa)
- The Ottawa Hospital, Ottawa, Ontario (University of Ottawa)
- West Parry Sound Health Centre, Parry Sound, Ontario (Northern Ontario School of Medicine)
- Sault Area Hospital, Sault Ste. Marie, Ontario (Northern Ontario School of Medicine)
- Lookout Meno Ya Win Health Centre, Sioux Lookout, Ontario (Northern Ontario School of Medicine)
- Health Sciences North, Sudbury, Ontario (Northern Ontario School of Medicine)
- Thunder Bay Regional Health Sciences Centre, Thunder Bay, Ontario (Northern Ontario School of Medicine)
- Timmins and District Hospital, Timmins, Ontario (Northern Ontario School of Medicine)
- Baycrest, Toronto, Ontario (University of Toronto)
- Centre for Addiction and Mental Health, Toronto, Ontario (University of Toronto)
- Hospital for Sick Children, Toronto, Ontario (University of Toronto)
- Markham Stouffville Hospital, Markham, Ontario – beginning 2010 (University of Toronto)
- Mount Sinai Hospital, Toronto, Toronto, Ontario (University of Toronto)
- North York General Hospital, Toronto, Ontario (University of Toronto)
- Princess Margaret Cancer Centre, Toronto, Ontario (University of Toronto)
- St. John's Rehab Hospital, Toronto, Ontario (University of Toronto)
- St. Michael's Hospital, Toronto (University of Toronto)
- Sunnybrook Health Sciences Centre, Toronto, Ontario (University of Toronto)
- Toronto East General Hospital (University of Toronto)
- Toronto General Hospital (University of Toronto)
- Toronto Rehabilitation Institute, Toronto, Ontario (University of Toronto)
- Toronto Western Hospital (University of Toronto)
- Women's College Hospital, Toronto, Ontario (University of Toronto)

=== Prince Edward Island ===
- Queen Elizabeth Hospital, Charlottetown, Prince Edward Island – Dalhousie University Faculty of Medicine

=== Quebec ===
- Centre hospitalier de l'Université de Montréal, Montreal, Quebec
- Centre hospitalier universitaire Sainte-Justine, Montreal, Quebec
- Douglas Hospital, Montreal, Quebec
- Hôpital Maisonneuve-Rosemont (Université de Montréal), Montreal, Quebec
- Hôpital du Sacré-Cœur de Montréal, Montreal, Quebec
- Institut Philippe-Pinel de Montréal (Université de Montréal), Montreal, Quebec
- Institut universitaire en santé mentale de Montréal (Université de Montréal)
- Jewish General Hospital (McGill University), Montreal, Quebec
- McGill University Health Centre (McGill University), Montreal, Quebec
- St. Mary's Hospital (McGill University), Montreal, Quebec
- Centre hospitalier universitaire de Québec – Centre hospitalier de l'Université Laval, Quebec City, Quebec
  - Hôpital Saint-François d'Assise, Quebec City, Quebec
  - Hôtel-Dieu de Québec, Quebec City, Quebec
  - Centre hospitalier de l'Université Laval, Quebec City, Quebec
- Centre hospitalier universitaire de Sherbrooke (Université de Sherbrooke), Sherbrooke

=== Saskatchewan ===
- Regional Psychiatric Centre, Saskatoon, Saskatchewan
- Royal University Hospital, Saskatoon, Saskatchewan

== Chile ==
- Hospital Clínico de la Pontificia Universidad Católica de Chile, Pontifical Catholic University of Chile
- Hospital Dr. Hernán Henríquez Aravena, University of La Frontera
- Hospital Clínico de la Universidad de Chile, University of Chile
- Hospital Clínico Viña del Mar, National University Andres Bello
- Hospital Clínico Instituto de Seguridad del Trabajo, in Viña del Mar
- Hospital Clínico Herminda Martin, in Chillán

== China ==
=== Guangzhou ===
- Third Affiliated Hospital of Sun Yat Sen University, Guangzhou, Canton

=== Hebei ===
- Third Hospital of Hebei Medical University, Shijiazhuang, Hebei

=== Hubei ===
- Wuhan Union Hospital, Tongji Medical College, Wuhan
- Wuhan Tongji Hospital, Tongji Medical College, Wuhan

=== Nanjing ===
- Jiangsu Province hospital, Nanjing First Affiliated Hospital, Nanjing Medical University
- Nanjing Brain Hospital, Nanjing Medical University

=== Shanghai ===
Affiliated with Shanghai Medical College, Fudan University

- Children's Hospital of Fudan University
- Eye and ENT Hospital of Fudan University
- Huadong Hospital
- Huashan Hospital
- Shanghai Cancer Center
- Shanghai Fifth People's Hospital
- Zhongshan Hospital

Affiliated with School of Medicine, Shanghai Jiao Tong University

- Shanghai First People's Hospital
- Shanghai Third People's Hospital
- Shanghai Sixth People's Hospital
- Shanghai Ninth People's Hospital
- Renji Hospital
- Ruijin Hospital
- Shanghai Chest Hospital
- Shanghai Children's Hospital
- Shanghai Children's Medical Center
- Shanghai Mental Health Center
- Xinhua Hospital

=== Sichuan ===
- Sichuan University Hospitals

=== Wenzhou ===
- First Affiliated Hospital, Wenzhou Medical University
- Second Affiliated Hospital, Wenzhou Medical University

=== Zhejiang ===
- First Affiliated Hospital, Zhejiang University School of Medicine
- Second Affiliated Hospital, Zhejiang University School of Medicine
- Sir Run Run Shaw Hospital, Zhejiang University School of Medicine
- Children's Hospital, Zhejiang University School of Medicine
- Women's Hospital, Zhejiang University School of Medicine
- Zhejiang Stomatology Hospital, Zhejiang University School of Medicine

== Colombia ==
- Clínica Universitaria Teletón, Bogotá
- Hospital Militar Central, Bogotá
- Hospital Infantil Universitario de San José, Bogotá
- Hospital Universitario Nacional de Colombia, Bogotá
- Hospital San Juan de Dios, Bogotá
- Hospital Universitario del Valle, Cali
- Hospital Universitario Fundación Santa fé, Bogotá
- Hospital Universitario de la Samaritana (HUS), Bogotá
- Hospital Universitario San Ignacio (HUSI), Bogotá
- Hospital Universitario San Vicente de Paul (HUSVP), Medellín
- Hospital Universitario de Santander, Bucaramanga
- Hospital Universitario de Bucaramanga, Bucaramanga
- Instituto Nacional de Cancerologia, Bogotá
- Clínica Universitaria Colombia – Colsanitas, Bogotá

== Czech Republic ==
- Fakultní nemocnice v Motole, Prague
- Všeobecná fakultní nemocnice v Praze, Prague
- Fakultní nemocnice Královské Vinohrady, Prague
- Ústřední vojenská nemocnice, Prague
- Fakultní Thomayerova Nemocnice, Prague
- Fakultní nemocnice Olomouc, Olomouc
- Fakultní nemocnice Hradec Králové, Hradec Králové
- Fakultní nemocnice Plzeň, Plzeň
- Fakultní nemocnice Ostrava, Ostrava
- Fakultní nemocnice Brno, Brno
- Fakultní nemocnice u sv. Anny v Brně, Brno

== Denmark ==
- Aalborg University Hospital, Aalborg
- Aarhus University Hospital, Aarhus
- Rigshospitalet, Copenhagen
- Odense University Hospital, Odense

== Egypt ==
=== Cairo ===
- Al Azhar University Hospitals (Al Hussien Hospital) and (Sayed Galal Hospital)
- Ain Shams University Hospital (El-Demerdash Hospital)
- Kasr El Aini Hospital
- National Cancer Institute Egypt
- Theodor Bilharz Research Institute
- Souaad Kafafi University Hospital, Misr University for Science and Technology College of Medicine

=== Alexandria ===
- Alexandria University Hospitals
- Medical research institute university hospital
- The Suzanne Mubarak Regional Centre for Women's Health and Development

=== Assiut ===
- Assiut University Hospital

=== Beni-Suef ===
- Beni-Suef University Hospital

=== Fayoum ===
- Fayoum University Hospital

=== Ismailia ===
- Suez Canal University Hospital
- Ismailia Teaching oncology hospital

=== Kafrelsheikh ===
- Kafrelsheikh University Hospital

=== Mansoura ===
- Mansoura University Hospital

=== Minufiya ===
- Minufiya University Hospital

=== Sohag ===
- South Valley University Hospital

=== Tanta ===
- Tanta University Hospital

=== Aswan ===
- Aswan University Hospital

== Estonia ==
- Tartu University Clinic, University of Tartu

== Finland ==
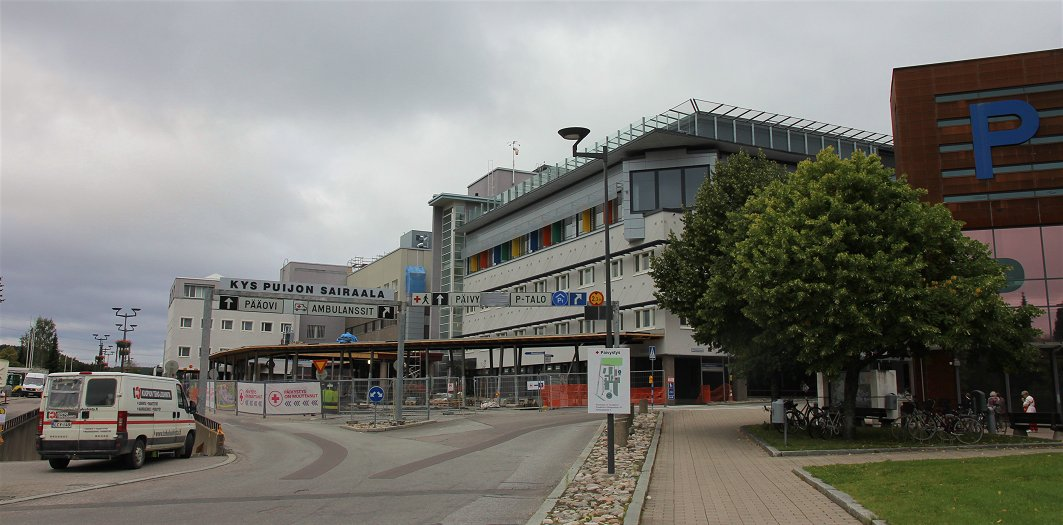
The central unit of the Kuopio University Hospital in Puijonlaakso, Finland

- Helsinki University Central Hospital (HUS), University of Helsinki
- Kuopio University Hospital (KYS), University of Eastern Finland
- Oulu University Hospital (OYS), University of Oulu
- Tampere University Hospital (TAYS), University of Tampere
- Turku University Hospital (TYKS), University of Turku

== France ==
Note: Centre hospitalier universitaire is often abbreviated CHU.

- Centre hospitalier universitaire d'Amiens, Amiens, France – University of Picardie Jules Verne
- Centre hospitalier universitaire d'Angers, Angers, France – University of Angers
- Centre hospitalier universitaire de Besançon
  - Jean Minjoz Hospital, Besançon – University of Franche-Comté
  - Hôpital Saint-Jacques Besançon – University of Franche-Comté
- Centre hospitalier universitaire de Bordeaux, Bordeaux, France – University of Bordeaux
- Centre hospitalier universitaire de Brest, Brest, France – University of Western Brittany
- Centre hospitalier régional universitaire de Caen, Caen, France – University of Caen Lower Normandy
- Centre hospitalier universitaire de Clermont-Ferrand, Clermont-Ferrand, France – University of Auvergne
- Centre hospitalier universitaire de Dijon, Dijon, France – University of Burgundy
- Centre hospitalier universitaire de Fort-de-France, Fort-de-France
- Grenoble University Hospital Centre, Grenoble – University of Grenoble
- Centre hospitalier régional universitaire de Lille, Lille, France – University of Lille II
- Centre hospitalier régional universitaire de Limoges, Limoges, France – University of Limoges
- Hospices civils de Lyon, Lyon, France – Claude Bernard University Lyon 1
- Assistance publique – Hôpitaux de Marseille (AP-HM) – Aix-Marseille University
  - Hôpital de la Timone, Marseille, France
  - Hôpital Nord, Marseille, France
- Centre hospitalier universitaire de Montpellier, Montpellier, France
- Centre hospitalier régional et universitaire de Nancy, Nancy, France – Henri Poincaré University
- Centre hospitalier universitaire de Nantes, Nantes, France – Nantes University
- Centre hospitalier universitaire de Nice, Nice, France – University of Nice Sophia Antipolis
- Centre hospitalier universitaire de Nimes, Nimes, France
- Assistance publique – Hôpitaux de Paris (AP-HP)
  - Groupe hospitalier Hôpitaux universitaires Henri-Mondor
    - Centre hospitalier universitaire Henri-Mondor
    - Hôpital Albert-Chenevier
    - Hôpital Émile-Roux
    - Hôpital Joffre-Dupuytren
    - Hôpital Georges-Clemenceau
  - Groupe hospitalier hôpitaux universitaires Pitié-Salpêtrière – Charles Foix
    - Pitié-Salpêtrière Hospital
    - Hôpital Charles-Foix
  - Groupe hospitalier hôpitaux universitares Saint Louis – Lariboisière – Fernand Widal
    - Hôpital Saint-Louis
    - Lariboisière Hospital
    - Hôpital Fernand-Widal
  - Groupe hospitalier hôpital universitaire Necker-Enfants Malades
  - Groupe hospitalier hôpital universitaire Robert-Debré
  - Groupe hospitalier Hôpitaux universitaires Est Parisien
    - Hôpital Tenon
    - Hôpital Saint-Antoine
    - Hôpital Rothschild
    - Hôpital Armand-Trousseau
    - Hôpital de La Roche-Guyon
  - Groupe hospitalier hôpitaux universitaires Paris Centre
    - Hôpital Cochin
    - Hôtel-Dieu de Paris
    - Hôpital Broca
  - Groupe hospitalier hôpitaux universitaires Paris Île-de-France Ouest
    - Raymond Poincaré University Hospital
    - Hôpital maritime de Berck
    - Hôpital Ambroise-Paré (Boulogne-Billancourt)
  - Groupe Hospitalier hôpitaux universitaires Paris Nord Val de Seine
    - Hôpital Bichat-Claude-Bernard
    - Beaujon Hospital
    - Hôpital Louis-Mourier
    - Hôpital Bretonneau
    - Hôpital Adélaïde-Hautval
  - Groupe hospitalier Hôpitaux universitaires Paris Ouest
    - Hôpital Européen Georges-Pompidou
    - Hôpital Corentin-Celton
    - Hôpital Vaugirard – Gabriel-Pallez
  - Groupe hospitalier hôpitaux universitaires Paris-Seine-Saint-Denis
    - Avicenne Hospital
    - Hôpital Jean-Verdier
    - Hôpital René-Muret-Bigottini
    - Sainte-Périne - Rossini - Chardon-Lagache Hospital
  - Groupe hospitalier hôpitaux universitaires Paris-Sud
    - Bicêtre Hospital
    - Hôpital Paul-Brousse
    - Hôpital Antoine-Béclère
- Institut Gustave Roussy, Villejuif
- Val-de-Grâce (Hôpital d'instruction des armées du Val-de-Grâce or HIA Val-de-Grâce), Paris
- Centre hospitalier universitaire de Pointe-à-Pitre, Pointe-à-Pitre
- Centre hospitalier universitaire de Poitiers, Poitiers, France – University of Poitiers
- Centre hospitalier universitaire de Reims, Reims, France – University of Reims Champagne-Ardenne
- Centre hospitalier universitaire de Rennes, Rennes, France – University of Rennes 1
- Centre hospitalier universitaire de La Réunion, Saint-Denis, Réunion
- Centre hospitalier universitaire de Rouen, Rouen, France – University of Rouen
- Centre hospitalier universitaire de Saint-Étienne
- Hôpitaux universitaires de Strasbourg, Strasbourg, France – Strasbourg University
- Centre hospitalier universitaire de Toulouse, Toulouse, France – Paul Sabatier University
- Centre hospitalier régional universitaire de Tours, Tours, France – Francois R

== Germany ==
=== Baden-Württemberg ===
- University Medical Center Freiburg, Freiburg
- University Hospital Heidelberg, Heidelberg
- Psychiatrische Universitätsklinik Heidelberg
- Universitätsmedizin Mannheim, Mannheim
- Universitätsklinikum Tübingen, Tübingen
- Universitätsklinikum Ulm, Ulm
- RKU – Universitäts- und Rehabilitationskliniken Ulm (University of Ulm)
- Acura-Rheumazentrum Baden-Baden, Baden-Baden (Heidelberg University)
- Klinikum Mittelbaden Baden-Baden Balg, Baden-Baden (Heidelberg University)
- Universitäts-Herzzentrum Freiburg-Bad Krozingen (University of Freiburg)
- Caritas-Krankenhaus Bad Mergentheim, Bad Mergentheim (University of Würzburg)
- Vulpius Klinik, Bad Rappenau (Heidelberg University)
- Fachklinik für Neurologie Dietenbronn (University of Ulm)
- Zentrum für Psychiatrie Emmendingen (University of Freiburg)
- Klinikum Esslingen, Esslingen am Neckar (University of Tübingen)
- Krankenhaus Freudenstadt, Freudenstadt (University of Tübingen)
- Klinikum Friedrichshafen, Friedrichshafen (University of Tübingen)
- Agaplesion Bethanien Krankenhaus Heidelberg (Heidelberg University)
- SRH Kurpfalzkrankenhaus Heidelberg (Heidelberg University)
- Nationales Centrum für Tumorerkrankungen, Heidelberg (Heidelberg University)
- SRH Klinikum Karlsbad-Langensteinbach, Karlsbad (Baden) (Heidelberg University)
- Diakonissenkrankenhaus Karlsruhe-Rüppurr, Karlsruhe (University of Freiburg)
- St. Vincentius-Kliniken, Karlsruhe (University of Freiburg)
- Städtisches Klinikum Karlsruhe, Karlsruhe (University of Freiburg)
- Kreiskrankenhaus Lörrach, Lörrach (University of Freiburg)
- Diakonissenkrankenhaus Mannheim (Heidelberg University)
- Theresienkrankenhaus und St. Hedwig-Klinik Mannheim (Heidelberg University)
- Neckar-Odenwald-Kliniken, Mosbach (Heidelberg University)
- Krankenhaus St. Elisabeth, Ravensburg (University of Ulm)
- Diakonie-Klinikum Schwäbisch Hall, Schwäbisch Hall (Heidelberg University)
- Robert-Bosch-Hospital, Stuttgart (University of Tübingen)
- Diakonie-Klinikum Stuttgart, Stuttgart (University of Tübingen)
- Karl-Olga Hospital, Stuttgart (University of Ulm)
- Klinikum Stuttgart (University of Tübingen)
  - Bürgerhospital
  - Katharinenhospital
  - Krankenhaus Bad Cannstatt
  - Olgahospital
- Marienhospital Stuttgart (University of Tübingen)
- Klinikum Landkreis Tuttlingen, Tuttlingen and Spaichingen (University of Freiburg)
- Bundeswehrkrankenhaus Ulm, Ulm (University of Ulm)
- Schwarzwald-Baar Klinikum Villingen-Schwenningen (University of Freiburg)
- GRN-Klinik Weinheim, Weinheim (Heidelberg University)
- Klinikum am Weissenhof, Weinsberg (Heidelberg University)
- Psychiatrisches Zentrum Nordbaden, Wiesloch (Heidelberg University)
- Spitäler Hochrhein (University of Freiburg)
- Ortenau Klinikum
  - Ortenau Klinikum Lahr-Ettenheim (University of Freiburg)
  - Ortenau Klinikum Offenburg-Gengenbach (University of Freiburg)
- Kliniken Landkreis Biberach (University of Ulm)
  - Kreisklinik Biberach, Biberach an der Riss
  - District Clinic Laupheim, Laupheim
  - District Hospital Ochsenhausen, Ochsenhausen
  - District Hospital Riedlingen, Riedlingen

=== Bavaria ===
- Universitätsklinikum Erlangen, Erlangen
- Psychiatrische Universitätsklinik Erlangen, Erlangen
- LMU Klinikum, Munich
  - Campus Innenstadt
  - Campus Großhadern
  - Dr. von Hauner Children's Hospital
- Rechts der Isar Hospital, Munich
- Helios Klinikum München West – Klinikum München Pasing (LMU Munich)
- Universitätsklinikum Regensburg, Regensburg
- Universitätsklinikum Würzburg, Würzburg
- Klinikum St. Marien Amberg, Amberg (University of Erlangen–Nuremberg and University of Regensburg)
- Augsburg Hospital, Augsburg (University of Augsburg)
- Augsburg Hospital Sued, Augsburg (University of Augsburg)
- Bezirkskrankenhaus Augsburg, Augsburg (University of Augsburg)
- Josefinum, Augsburg (LMU Munich)
- Bayreuth Medical Center, Bayreuth (University of Erlangen–Nuremberg)
- Bezirkskrankenhaus Bayreuth, Bayreuth (University of Erlangen–Nuremberg)
- Klinikum Coburg, Coburg (University of Würzburg)
- Klinikum Landkreis Erding, Erding (Technical University of Munich)
- Waldkrankenhaus St. Marien, Erlangen (University of Erlangen–Nuremberg)
- Klinikum Freising, Freising (Technical University of Munich)
- Klinikum Fürth, Fürth (University of Erlangen–Nuremberg)
- German Center for Pediatric and Adolescent Rheumatology, Garmisch-Partenkirchen (LMU Munich)
- Klinikum Kaufbeuren, Kaufbeuren (LMU Munich)
- Bezirkskrankenhaus Kempten, Kempten (University of Ulm)
- Klinikum Kempten, Kempten (University of Ulm)
- Klinikum Landshut, Landshut (LMU Munich)
- Klinikum Memmingen, Memmingen (LMU Munich)
- Deutsches Herzzentrum München, Munich (Technical University of Munich)
- Frauenklinik an der Maistraße, Munich (LMU Munich)
- Kbo-Heckscher-Klinikum, Munich (LMU Munich)
- Klinik Augustinum München, Munich (LMU Munich)
- Klinikum Bogenhausen, Munich (Technical University of Munich)
- Klinikum Harlaching, Munich (LMU Munich)
- Klinikum Neuperlach, Munich (LMU Munich)
- Krankenhaus Barmherzige Brüder, Munich (Technical University of Munich)
- Krankenhaus Martha Maria, Munich (LMU Munich)
- Klinikum Schwabing, Munich (LMU Munich and Technical University of Munich)
- Klinik Thalkirchner Straße, Munich (LMU Munich)
- Maria-Theresia-Klinik, Munich (LMU Munich)
- Rotkreuzklinikum München, Munich (Technical University of Munich)
- Berufsgenossenschaftliche Unfallklinik Murnau, Murnau am Staffelsee (Technical University of Munich)
- Klinikum Neumarkt in der Oberpfalz, Neumarkt in der Oberpfalz (University of Erlangen–Nuremberg)
- Klinikum Nürnberg, Nuremberg (Paracelsus Medical University)
- St. Theresien-Krankenhaus Nürnberg, Nuremberg (University of Erlangen–Nuremberg)
- Klinikum Passau, Passau (University of Regensburg)
- Bezirksklinikum Regensburg, Regensburg (University of Regensburg)
- Caritas-Krankenhaus St. Josef Regensburg, Regensburg (University of Regensburg)
- Krankenhaus Barmherzige Brüder, Regensburg (University of Regensburg)
- Stadtkrankenhaus Schwabach, Schwabach (University of Erlangen–Nuremberg)
- Leopoldina-Krankenhaus Schweinfurt, Schweinfurt (University of Würzburg)
- Klinikum Traunstein, Traunstein (LMU Munich)
- Inn-Salzach-Klinikum, Wasserburg am Inn (LMU Munich)
- Kreisklinik Wörth an der Donau, Wörth an der Donau (University of Regensburg)
- Stiftung Juliusspital Würzburg, Würzburg (University of Würzburg)

=== Berlin ===
- Charité – Universitätsmedizin Berlin, Berlin:
  - Campus Benjamin Franklin (CBF), Berlin-Steglitz
  - Campus Berlin-Buch (CBB), Berlin-Buch
  - Charité Campus Mitte (CCM), Berlin-Mitte
  - Campus Virchow-Klinikum (CVK), Berlin-Wedding
- Bundeswehrkrankenhaus Berlin, Berlin (Charité – Universitätsmedizin Berlin)
- Deutsches Herzzentrum Berlin
- Evangelische Lungenklinik Berlin, Berlin (Charité – Universitätsmedizin Berlin)
- Evangelisches Krankenhaus Königin Elisabeth Herzberge, Berlin (Charité – Universitätsmedizin Berlin)
- Evangelisches Waldkrankenhaus Spandau, Berlin (Humboldt University of Berlin)
- Jüdisches Krankenhaus Berlin, Berlin (Charité – Universitätsmedizin Berlin)
- Krankenhaus Hedwigshöhe, Berlin (Charité – Universitätsmedizin Berlin)
- Krankenhaus Köpenick, Berlin (Charité – Universitätsmedizin Berlin)
- Krankenhaus Waldfriede, Berlin (Charité – Universitätsmedizin Berlin)
- Martin-Luther-Krankenhaus, Berlin (Charité – Universitätsmedizin Berlin)
- Oskar-Ziethen-Krankenhaus, Berlin (Charité – Universitätsmedizin Berlin)
- Park-Klinik Weißensee, Berlin (Charité – Universitätsmedizin Berlin)
- Rudolf-Virchow-Krankenhaus, Berlin (Charité – Universitätsmedizin Berlin)
- Sankt-Gertrauden-Krankenhaus, Berlin (Charité – Universitätsmedizin Berlin)
- St. Hedwig-Krankenhaus, Berlin (Charité – Universitätsmedizin Berlin)
- St. Joseph Krankenhaus Berlin-Tempelhof, Berlin (Free University of Berlin)
- Schlosspark-Klinik, Berlin (Free University of Berlin)
- Unfallkrankenhaus Berlin, Berlin (Charité – Universitätsmedizin Berlin and University of Greifswald)
- Vivantes Auguste-Viktoria-Klinikum Berlin, Berlin (Charité – Universitätsmedizin Berlin)
- Vivantes Klinikum im Friedrichshain, Berlin (Charité – Universitätsmedizin Berlin)
- Vivantes Klinikum Am Urban, Berlin (Charité – Universitätsmedizin Berlin)
- Vivantes Humboldt-Klinikum, Berlin (Charité – Universitätsmedizin Berlin)
- Vivantes Klinikum Kaulsdorf, Berlin (Charité – Universitätsmedizin Berlin)
- Vivantes Klinikum Neukölln, Berlin (Charité – Universitätsmedizin Berlin)

=== Brandenburg ===
- Immanuel Klinikum Bernau, Bernau bei Berlin (Medical University of Brandenburg)
- Klinikum Brandenburg, Brandenburg an der Havel (Medical University of Brandenburg)
- Carl-Thiem-Klinikum Cottbus, Cottbus (Charité – Universitätsmedizin Berlin, Martin Luther University Halle-Wittenberg, TU Dresden)
- Ruppiner Kliniken, Neuruppin (Medical University of Brandenburg)
- Klinikum Ernst von Bergmann Potsdam, Potsdam (Charité – Universitätsmedizin Berlin)
- Werner-Forßmann-Krankenhaus, Eberswalde (Charité – Universitätsmedizin Berlin)

=== Bremen ===
- Klinikum Bremerhaven, Bremerhaven (University of Göttingen)
- Klinikum Bremen-Mitte (University of Göttingen)
- Klinikum Bremen-Nord (University of Hamburg)
- Klinikum Bremen-Ost (University of Göttingen)
- Klinikum Links der Weser (University of Göttingen)
- Rotes Kreuz Krankenhaus Bremen (Hannover Medical School)
- St. Joseph-Stift Bremen (University of Göttingen)

=== Hamburg ===
- University Medical Center Hamburg-Eppendorf, (Universitätsklinikum Hamburg-Eppendorf (UKE)). Hamburg
  - Altona Children's Hospital
- Helios Endo-Klinik Hamburg, University of Hamburg
- Helios Mariahilf Klinik Hamburg, University of Hamburg
- Israelitisches Krankenhaus Hamburg, University of Hamburg
- Marienkrankenhaus Hamburg, University of Hamburg
- BG Klinikum Hamburg
- Schön Klinik Hamburg Eilbek, University of Hamburg
- Asklepios Kliniken Hamburg, University of Hamburg
  - Asklepios Clinic St. Georg
  - Asklepios Klinik Wandsbek
  - Asklepios Klinik Barmbek
  - Asklepios Klinik Nord
  - Asklepios Klinik Altona, Altona, Hamburg
  - Asklepios Klinikum Harburg
  - Asklepios Westklinikum Hamburg (Kiel University)

=== Hessen ===
- Universitätsklinikum Frankfurt am Main, Frankfurt
- Klinikum Bad Hersfeld (Academic Teaching Hospital of University of Giessen)
- Klinikum Darmstadt, Darmstadt (Heidelberg University, Goethe University Frankfurt)
- Klinikum Fulda, Fulda (Marburg University)
- Klinikum Kassel, Kassel (Marburg University)
- Horst-Schmidt-Kliniken, Wiesbaden (University of Mainz)
- Asklepios Klinik Lich (Academic Teaching Hospital of the University of Giessen)
- Asklepios Paulinen Clinic Wiesbaden (Goethe University Frankfurt)
- Asklepios Clinic Seligenstadt (Goethe University Frankfurt)
- Asklepios Klinik Langen (Goethe University Frankfurt)
- Asklepios Kliniken Bad Wildungen (Marburg University)
- Asklepios Klinik Melsungen (Marburg University)
- Asklepios Klinik Schwalmstadt (Marburg University)
- University Hospital of Giessen and Marburg
  - Campus Gießen, Giessen
  - Campus Marburg, Marburg

=== Mecklenburg-Vorpommern ===
- Greifswald University Hospital, University of Greifswald, Greifswald
- Universitätsklinikum Rostock, Rostock
- Helios Kliniken Schwerin, Schwerin (University of Rostock)

=== Lower Saxony ===
- Universitätsklinikum Göttingen, Göttingen
- Klinikum der Medizinischen Hochschule Hannover (Hannover Medical School)
- Kinderkrankenhaus auf der Built, Hannover (Hannover Medical School)
- KRH Klinikum Nordstadt, Hannover (Hannover Medical School)
- Dr. Herbert Nieper Hospital Goslar (University of Göttingen)
- Fritz-König-Stift Bad Harzburg (University of Göttingen)
- Asklepios Fachklinikum Göttingen (University of Göttingen)
- Asklepios Fachklinikum Tiefenbrunn (University of Göttingen)
- Asklepios Kliniken Schildautal Seesen (University of Göttingen)

=== North Rhine-Westphalia ===
- Universitätsklinikum Aachen, Aachen
- University Hospitals of the Ruhr-University of Bochum, Bochum, Herne and Bad Oeynhausen
  - Bergmannsheil University Hospitals, Bochum
  - St. Josef-Hospital Bochum, Bochum
  - St. Elisabeth-Hospital Bochum
- Augusta-Kranken-Anstalt Bochum (University of Duisburg-Essen)
- Universitätsklinikum Bonn, Bonn
- Universitätsklinikum Düsseldorf, Düsseldorf
- Universitäts-Augenklinik Düsseldorf
- Universitätsklinikum Essen, Essen
- Universitätsklinikum Köln, Cologne
- Kliniken der Stadt Köln
  - Krankenhaus Köln-Merheim, Cologne (University of Cologne and Witten/Herdecke University)
  - Krankenhaus Köln-Holweide, Cologne (University of Cologne)
  - Kinderkrankenhaus Amsterdamer Straße, Cologne (University of Cologne)
- Helios Klinikum Krefeld, Krefeld (RWTH Aachen University)
- Universitätsklinikum Münster, Münster
- Bodenseeklinik, Lindau
- Klinikum am Weissenhof, Weinsberg (Heidelberg University)
- Asklepios Children's Hospital Sankt Augustin (University of Bonn)
- DRK-Kinderklinik Siegen, Siegen (Marburg University)
- Helios Klinikum Niederberg, Velbert (University of Duisburg-Essen)
- Helios Universitätsklinikum Wuppertal, Wuppertal (Witten/Herdecke University)

=== Rhineland-Palatinate ===
- Klinikum der Johannes Gutenberg-Universität Mainz, Mainz
- Berufsgenossenschaftliche Unfallklinik Ludwigshafen, Ludwigshafen (Heidelberg University)
- Klinikum der Stadt Ludwigshafen, Ludwigshafen (University of Mainz and Heidelberg University)
- Evangelisches Stift St. Martin Koblenz, Koblenz (University of Mainz)
- Bundeswehrzentralkrankenhaus Koblenz, Koblenz (University of Mainz)
- Katholisches Klinikum Koblenz-Montabaur, Koblenz (University of Mainz)

=== Saarland ===
- Universitätsklinikum des Saarlandes, Homburg

=== Saxony ===
- Universitätsklinikum Dresden, Dresden
- University of Leipzig Medical Center, Leipzig
- Klinikum St. Georg, Leipzig
- Park-Klinikum Leipzig (Leipzig University)
- Herzzentrum Leipzig (Leipzig University)
- Klinikum Chemnitz, Chemnitz (Leipzig University, TU Dresden)

=== Saxony-Anhalt ===
- Berufsgenossenschaftliche Kliniken Bergmannstrost Halle, University of Halle–Wittenberg
- Universitätsklinikum Halle, Halle, University of Halle-Wittenberg
- Universitätsklinikum Magdeburg, Otto von Guericke University Magdeburg, Magdeburg
- Asklepios-Klinik, Weißenfels, University of Halle-Wittenberg

=== Schleswig-Holstein ===
- Universitätsklinikum Schleswig-Holstein
  - Campus Lübeck, Lübeck
  - Campus Kiel, Kiel

=== Thuringia ===
- Universitätsklinikum Jena, Friedrich Schiller University of Jena
- Zentralklinik Bad Berka, Bad Berka – Friedrich Schiller University of Jena
- Klinikum Altenburger Land, Altenburg and Schmölln – Friedrich Schiller University of Jena & Leipzig University
- Robert-Koch-Krankenhaus Apolda, Apolda – Friedrich Schiller University of Jena
- St. Georg Klinikum Eisenach, Eisenach – Friedrich Schiller University of Jena
- Waldkliniken Eisenberg, Eisenberg – Friedrich Schiller University of Jena
- Helios Klinikum Erfurt, Erfurt – Friedrich Schiller University of Jena
- Katholisches Krankenhaus Erfurt, Erfurt – Friedrich Schiller University of Jena
- Klinikum Bad Salzungen, Bad Salzungen – Friedrich Schiller University of Jena
- SRH Wald-Klinikum Gera, Gera – Friedrich Schiller University of Jena
- Helios Kreiskrankenhaus Gotha/Ohrdruf, Gotha – Friedrich Schiller University of Jena
- Kreiskrankenhaus Greiz, Greiz – Friedrich Schiller University of Jena
- Helios Fachkliniken Hildburghausen, Hildburghausen – Friedrich Schiller University of Jena
- Helios Klinikum Meiningen, Meiningen – Friedrich Schiller University of Jena
- Ökumenisches Hainich-Klinikum Mühlhausen – Friedrich Schiller University of Jena
- Südharz Klinikum Nordhausen, Nordhausen – Friedrich Schiller University of Jena & Martin Luther University of Halle-Wittenberg
- Thüringen-Kliniken „Georgius Agricola" (Pößneck, Rudolstadt, Saalfeld) – Friedrich Schiller University of Jena
- SRH Zentralklinikum Suhl, Suhl – Friedrich Schiller University of Jena
- Sophien- und Hufeland-Klinikum Weimar, Weimar – Friedrich Schiller University of Jena

== Greece ==
- University General Hospital "ATTIKON" – Athens
- University General Hospital of Heraklion "PAGNI" – Heraklion
- University Hospital of Ioannina – Ioannina
- University Hospital of Larissa – Larissa
- General University Hospital of Patras – Patras
- University General Hospital of Thessaloniki "AHEPA" – Thessaloniki

== Ghana ==
- Korle Bu Teaching Hospital, University of Ghana Medical School, Accra
- Komfo Anokye Teaching Hospital, Kwame Nkrumah University of Science and Technology College of Health Sciences, Kumasi
- Central Regional Hospital, University of Cape Coast School of Medical Sciences, Cape Coast
- Tamale Regional Teaching Hospital, University for Development Studies School of Medicine and Health Sciences, Tamale
- University Hospital, University of Cape Coast, Cape Coast
- University Hospital, Kwame Nkrumah University of Science & Technology, Kumasi
- University Hospital, University of Ghana, Legon

== Hong Kong ==
- Prince of Wales Hospital, Sha Tin – CUHK Faculty of Medicine
- The Duchess of Kent Children's Hospital at Sandy Bay
- Grantham Hospital
- Hong Kong Sanatorium and Hospital – Li Ka Shing Faculty of Medicine, The University of Hong Kong
- Alice Ho Miu Ling Nethersole Hospital – Li Ka Shing Faculty of Medicine, The University of Hong Kong
- Gleneagles Hong Kong Hospital – Li Ka Shing Faculty of Medicine, The University of Hong Kong
- Kowloon Hospital – CUHK Faculty of Medicine
- CUHK Medical Centre – CUHK Faculty of Medicine
- United Christian Hospital – CUHK Faculty of Medicine
- MacLehose Medical Rehabilitation Centre
- Pamela Youde Nethersole Eastern Hospital – Li Ka Shing Faculty of Medicine, The University of Hong Kong
- Prince Philip Dental Hospital
- Queen Mary Hospital, Pok Fu Lam – Li Ka Shing Faculty of Medicine, The University of Hong Kong
- Ruttonjee Hospital
- Tsan Yuk Hospital
- Tung Wah Hospital
- Tang Shiu Kin Hospital
- Tung Wah Eastern Hospital
- Queen Elizabeth Hospital

== Iceland ==
- Landspitali University Hospital, Reykjavík

== Indonesia ==
- Dr. Cipto Mangunkusumo Hospital, Jakarta
- Dharmais Hospital, Jakarta
- Harapan Kita Hospital, Jakarta
- Gatot Soebroto Army Hospital, Jakarta
- Dr. Soetomo Hospital, Surabaya
- Dr. Sardjito Hospital, Yogyakarta
- Dr. Kariadi Hospital, Semarang
- Dr. Hasan Sadikin Hospital, Bandung
- University of Indonesia Hospital, Depok

== Ireland ==
- Blackrock Clinic
- Mayo University Hospital, Mayo
- Connolly Hospital, Blanchardstown
- Cork University Hospital, Cork
- Mercy University Hospital, Cork
- Naas General Hospital, Naas
- Beaumont Hospital, Dublin
- Coombe Women & Infants University Hospital, Dublin
- Mater Misericordiae University Hospital, Dublin
- Royal Victoria Eye and Ear Hospital, Dublin
- St. James's Hospital, Dublin
- St. Vincent's University Hospital, Dublin
- St Patrick's University Hospital, Dublin
- University Hospital Galway, Galway
- Letterkenny University Hospital
- University Hospital Limerick, Limerick
- Roscommon University Hospital, Roscommon
- Tallaght University Hospital
- Temple Street Children's University Hospital, Dublin
- University Hospital Waterford, Waterford

== India ==
=== West Bengal ===
- Dr B C Roy Institute of Medical Sciences & Research – IIT Kharagpur

== Israel ==
- Hadassah Medical Centers, in Ein Kerem and Mount Scopus, Jerusalem
- Shaarei Zedek Medical Center, Jerusalem
- Bikur Holim Medical Center, Jerusalem
- Soroka Hospital, Beer Sheva
- Tel Aviv Sourasky Medical Center, Tel Aviv
- Rabin Medical Center, Petah Tikva
- Sheba Medical Center, Ramat Gan
- Yitzhak Shamir Medical Center (formerly assaf harofe), Tzrifin
- Rambam Hospital, Haifa
- Bnei Zion medical Center, Haifa
- Kaplan Medical Center, Rehovot
- Ziv Medical Center, Safed
- Wolfson Medical Center, Holon

== Italy ==
=== Abruzzo ===
- Ospedale SS. Annunziata di Chieti – University of Chieti-Pescara, Chieti
- Ospedale Regionale San Salvatore University of L'Aquila, L'Aquila

=== Apulia ===
- Azienda Ospedaliera Policlinico di Bari – University of Bari, Bari
- Azienda Ospedaliera Universitaria Ospedali Riuniti di Foggia – University of Foggia, Foggia
- Azienda ospedaliero-universitaria "Vito Fazzi"- University of Salento, Lecce
- Ospedale "Santissima Annunziata"- University of Bari, Taranto
- Ente ecclesiastico Ospedale regionale "Francesco Miulli"- LUM University, Acquaviva delle Fonti
- Azienda ospedaliera "Cardinale Giovanni Panico"- University of Bari, Tricase
- Ospedale "Perrino"- University of Bari, Brindisi

=== Calabria ===
- Azienda Ospedaliero – Universitaria Mater Domini – University of Catanzaro, Catanzaro

=== Campania ===
- Ospedale Gaetano Fucito, Mercato San Severino – University of Salerno
- Ospedale Sant'Anna e San Sebastiano, Second University of Naples and University of Naples Federico II; Caserta
- Azienda Ospedaliera Universitaria Federico II – University of Naples Federico II, Naples
- I Policlinico di Napoli – Second University of Naples, Naples
- A.O.R.N. Ospedale dei Colli – Second University of Naples, University of Naples Federico II; Naples
  - Ospedale Monaldi
  - CTO
  - Ospedale Cotugno – Second University of Naples, University of Naples Federico II; Naples
- Azienda Ospedaliera Universitaria OO.RR. San Giovanni di Dio Ruggi d'Aragona – University of Salerno, Salerno
- Istituto Scientifico di Riabilitazione di Telese Terme – University of Naples Federico II, Second University of Naples; Telese Terme

=== Emilia-Romagna ===
- Azienda Ospedaliera-Universitaria Policlinico Sant'Orsola-Malpighi – University of Bologna, Bologna

The following hospitals in Bologna are not strictly "university hospitals" but home at least one university department for research and teaching:

  - Istituto ortopedico Rizzoli – University of Bologna, Bologna
  - Ospedale Bellaria – University of Bologna, Bologna
  - Ospedale Maggiore – University of Bologna, Bologna
- Azienda Ospedaliera Universitaria di Ferrara Arcispedale Sant'Anna – University of Ferrara, Cona
- Azienda ospedaliera – Universitaria Policlinico di Modena – University of Modena and Reggio Emilia, Modena
- Nuovo Ospedale Civile S. Agostino-Estense – University of Modena and Reggio Emilia, Modena
- Azienda Ospedaliero- Universitaria di Parma – University of Parma, Parma
- Arcispedale Santa Maria Nuova – University of Modena and Reggio Emilia, University of Parma, Reggio Emilia
- Ospedale "Infermi", Rimini – University of Ferrara
- Ospedale Maurizio Bufalini, Cesena – University of Ferrara and University of Parma
- Ospedale Morgagni-Pierantoni, Forlì – University of Ferrara
- Ospedale Santa Maria delle Croci, Ravenna – University of Ferrara
- Ospedale di Bentivoglio, Bentivoglio – University of Ferrara
- Ospedale del Delta, Lagosanto – University of Ferrara
- Ospedale di Fidenza, Fidenza – University of Ferrara and University of Parma
- Villa Maria Cecilia Hospital, Cotignola – University of Ferrara and University of Pavia

=== Friuli-Venezia Giulia ===
Azienda Sanitaria Universitaria Integrata di Trieste – University of Trieste, Trieste

  - Ospedale Cattinara
  - Ospedale Maggiore
- Azienda Ospedaliero-Universitaria Santa Maria della Misericordia – University of Udine, Udine and Cividale del Friuli
- Ospedale di Tolmezzo – University of Udine, Tolmezzo

=== Lazio ===
- Ospedale Santa Maria Goretti – University of Rome "la Sapienza", Latina, Lazio
- Agostino Gemelli University Polyclinic – Università Cattolica del Sacro Cuore, Rome
- Azienda Ospedaliera San Giovanni Addolorata – University of Rome "la Sapienza", Rome
- Policlinico Universitario Campus Bío-Medico -Universita' Campus Bío-Medico, Rome- Trigoria
- Policlinico Umberto I – University of Rome "la Sapienza", Rome
- Ospedale Sant'Andrea – University of Rome "la Sapienza", Rome
- Policlinico Tor Vergata – University of Tor Vergata, Rome
- Policlinico Militare Celio – University of Rome "la Sapienza", Rome
- Ospedale San Filippo Neri – University of Rome "la Sapienza", Rome
- Ospedale Pediatrico Bambino Gesù – University of Rome "la Sapienza", Rome

=== Liguria ===
- IRCCS-Azienda Ospedaliera Universitaria "San Martino" – University of Genoa, Genoa
- Istituto Giannina Gaslini – University of Genoa, Genoa
- Ospedale Galliera – University of Genoa, Genoa

=== Lombardy ===
- Azienda Ospedaliera Papa Giovanni XXIII – University of Brescia, University of Milano Bicocca, Bergamo
- IRCCS San Giovanni di Dio Fatebenefratelli – University of Brescia, Università Cattolica del Sacro Cuore, University of Verona, Brescia, Italy
- Azienda Socio Sanitaria Territoriale degli Spedali Civili di Brescia
  - Spedali Civili di Brescia – University of Brescia, Brescia, Italy
  - Ospedale di Gardone Val Trompia, Gardone Val Trompia – University of Brescia
  - Ospedale di Montichiari, Montichiari – University of Brescia
- Azienda Socio Sanitaria Territoriale del Garda
  - Ospedale di Desenzano del Garda – University of Brescia
  - Ospedale di Gavardo – University of Brescia
  - Ospedale di Leno – University of Brescia
  - Ospedale di Lonato del Garda – University of Brescia
  - Ospedale di Manerbio – University of Brescia
  - Ospedale di Salò – University of Brescia
- Gruppo ospedaliero San Donato
  - Istituto Clinico Città di Brescia – University of Brescia, Università degli Studi eCampus, University of Verona, Brescia, Italy
  - Istituto Clinico Sant'Anna – University of Brescia, Università Cattolica del Sacro Cuore, University of Milan, University of Padua, University of Pavia, University of Trento, Brescia, Italy
  - Istituto Clinico San Rocco – University of Brescia, Vita-Salute San Raffaele University, Ome (Brescia)
  - Policlinico San Marco – University of Milano Bicocca, University of Milan; Osio Sotto
  - Policlinico San Pietro – University of Milano Bicocca and University of Milan, Ponte San Pietro
  - Istituto Clinico San Siro – University of Milan; Milan
  - Istituto Clinico Sant'Ambrogio – University of Milan and University of Insubria; Milan
  - IRCCS Istituto ortopedico Galeazzi – University of Milan, Milan
  - IRCCS Policlinico San Donato – University of Milan, San Donato Milanese
  - San Raffaele Hospital, Milan
  - Istituti Clinici Zucchi – University of Milano Bicocca, Monza and Carate Brianza
  - Istituto di Cura "Città di Pavia" – University of Pavia, Pavia
- Fondazione Poliambulanza – Università Cattolica del Sacro Cuore, Brescia, Italy
- Ospedale Carlo Poma di Mantova – University of Brescia, University of Milan, Mantua
- Azienda Ospedaliera Ospedale di Circolo di Busto Arsizio, Busto Arsizio
- Ospedale di Carate Brianza, Carate Brianza – University of Milano Bicocca, University of Pavia
- Ospedale Bassini – University of Milano Bicocca, Cinisello Balsamo
- Istituti Ospitalieri di Cremona – University of Brescia, Cremona
- Ospedale di Desio – University of Milano Bicocca and University of Milan, Desio
- Ospedale di Giussano, Giussano – University of Milano Bicocca
- Ospedale Civile di Legnano, Legnano – University of Milan
- Auxologico Meda, Meda – University of Milano Bicocca
- Azienda Ospedaliera Luigi Sacco – University of Milan, Milan
- Azienda Ospedaliera San Paolo – University of Milan, Milan
- European Institute of Oncology – University of Milan, Milan
- Fondazione IRCCS Ca' Granda Ospedale Maggiore Policlinico – University of Milan, Milan
- IRCCS Centro Cardiologico Monzino – University of Milan, Milan
- Istituto Auxologico San Luca – University of Milano Bicocca, University of Milan, University of Pavia, Milan
- Istituto Ortopedico Gaetano Pini – University of Milan, Milan
- Ospedale dei Bambini Vittore Buzzi – University of Milan, University of Milano Bicocca; Milan
- Ospedale Fatebenefratelli e Oftalmico- University of Milano Bicocca, University of Milan, University of Pavia
- Ospedale Niguarda Ca' Granda – University of Milan, Milan
- Ospedale San Carlo Borromeo – University of Milan, Milan
- Ospedale S.Giuseppe – University of Milan, Milan
- Ospedale San Luca – University of Milano Bicocca, Milan
- Azienda Ospedaliera San Gerardo – University of Milano Bicocca, Monza
- Policlinico di Monza – University of Milano Bicocca, University of Pavia
- IRCCS Policlinico San Matteo – University of Pavia, Pavia
- Istituto Santa Margherita, Pavia
- Istituto Clinico Humanitas – Humanitas University, Rozzano
- Ospedale Sant'Anna – University of Insubria, San Fermo della Battaglia
- Azienda Ospedaliera Bolognini, Seriate
- Ospedale Città di Sesto San Giovanni – University of Milano Bicocca, Sesto San Giovanni
- Ospedale di Circolo di Varese – University of Insubria, Varese
- Ospedale Filippo del Ponte – University of Insubria, Varese
- Ospedale di Vimercate – University of Milan, University of Milano Bicocca, Vimercate
- Fondazione Maugeri
  - Castel Goffredo – University of Pavia, University of Modena and Reggio Emilia
  - Milano – University of Milan
  - Montescano – University of Pavia
  - Lissone – University of Milano Bicocca
  - Lumezzane – University of Brescia, University of Pavia
  - Pavia – University of Pavia, University of Pisa, University of Genoa, University of Catania, University of Bologna
  - Tradate – University of Pavia, University of Insubria

=== Marche ===
- Azienda Ospedaliero Universitaria Ospedali Riuniti di Ancona – Marche Polytechnic University, Ancona Official site
  - Umberto I
  - GM Lancisi
  - G Salesi

=== Molise ===
- Ospedale Antonio Cardarelli – University of Molise, Campobasso

=== Piemonte ===
- Clinica Salus Alessandria, Alessandria
- Ospedale SS. Annunziata, University of Turin, Fossano
- Azienda Ospedaliera "Maggiore della Carità" – University of Eastern Piedmont, Novara
- Auxologico Piancavallo, Oggebbio – University of Eastern Piedmont, University of Turin
- Azienda Ospedaliera-Universitaria San Luigi Gonzaga – University of Turin, Orbassano
- Ospedale Infermi, Rivoli
- A.O.U. Città della Salute e della Scienza di Torino – University of Turin, Turin
  - CTO Hospital (Turin)
  - Ospedale Molinette
  - Ospedale Infantile Regina Margherita
  - Ospedale Ostetrico Ginecologico S.Anna
- Ospedale Amedeo di Savoia – University of Turin, Turin
- Ospedale Oftalmico, University of Turin, Turin
- Ospedale Sant'Andrea, Vercelli – University of Eastern Piedmont

=== Sardinia ===
- Azienda Ospedaliera Universitaria di Cagliari – University of Cagliari, Cagliari
  - Ospedale Civile
  - Policlinico Universitario Monserrato
- AO Brotzu – University of Cagliari, Cagliari
- Azienda Ospedaliera Universitaria di Sassari – University of Sassari, Sassari

=== Sicily ===
- Azienda Ospedaliero Universitaria "Policlinico - Vittorio Emanuele" – University of Catania, Catania
- P.O. Garibaldi – University of Catania, Catania
- P.O. Santa Marta – University of Catania, Catania
- Ospedale Santo Bambino – University of Catania, Catania
- Ospedale Umberto I, Enna
- A.O.U. Policlinico "Gaetano Martino" - Messina – University of Messina, Messina
- A.O. Papardo – University of Messina, Messina
- Azienda Ospedaliera Universitaria Policlinico Paolo Giaccone – University of Palermo, Palermo

=== Tuscany ===
- Azienda ospedaliero-universitaria Careggi – University of Florence, Florence
- Meyer Children's Hospital – University of Florence, Florence
- Azienda Ospedaliero-Universitaria Pisana – University of Pisa, Pisa :
  - Ospedale Cisanello, Pisa
  - Ospedale Santa Chiara, Pisa
- Azienda Ospedaliera Universitaria Senese – Ospedale Santa Maria alle Scotte – University of Siena, Siena

=== Umbria ===
- Azienda Ospedaliera Universitaria di Perugia, Perugia
- Ospedale di Terni, Terni

=== Veneto ===
- Azienda Ospedaliera di Padova – University of Padova, Padova
- Azienda Ospedaliera Universitaria Integrata Verona – University of Verona, Verona :
  - Policlinico G. B. Rossi, Borgo Roma, Verona
  - Ospedale Civile Maggiore, Borgo Trento, Verona
- Ospedale dell'Angelo – University of Padova, Venice
- Ospedale Alto Vicentino – University of Verona, Santorso
- Ospedale San Bartolo, Vicenza

== Japan ==
=== Hokkaido ===
- Asahikawa Medical College Hospital w:ja:旭川医科大学附属病院
- Hokkaido University Hospital w:ja:北海道大学病院
- Sapporo Medical University Hospital w:ja:札幌医科大学附属病院

=== Tohoku ===
- Aizu Medical Center w:ja:福島県立医科大学会津医療センター
- Akita University Hospital w:ja:秋田大学医学部附属病院
- Fukushima Medical University Hospital w:ja:福島県立医科大学附属病院
- Hirosaki University Hospital w:ja:弘前大学医学部附属病院
- Iwate Medical University Hospital w:ja:岩手医科大学附属病院
- Tohoku University Hospital w:ja:東北大学病院
- Yamagata University Hospital w:ja:山形大学医学部附属病院

=== Kantō and Shin'etsu ===
- Institute of Science Tokyo Hospital w:ja:東京科学大学病院
- Juntendo University Hospital w:ja:順天堂大学医学部附属順天堂医院
- Juntendo University Nerima Hospital w:ja:順天堂大学医学部附属練馬病院
- Keio University Hospital w:ja:慶應義塾大学病院
- Kitasato University Hospital w:ja:北里大学病院
- National Defense Medical College Hospital w:ja:防衛医科大学校病院
- Nihon University Itabashi Hospital w:ja:日本大学医学部附属板橋病院
- St. Marianna University School of Medicine Hospital w:ja:聖マリアンナ医科大学病院
- The University of Tokyo Hospital w:ja:東京大学医学部附属病院
- Tokai University Hospital w:ja:東海大学医学部付属病院
- Tokyo Medical University Hospital w:ja:東京医科大学病院
- University of Tsukuba Hospital w:ja:筑波大学附属病院
- Yokohama City University Hospital w:ja:横浜市立大学附属病院

=== Tōkai and Hokuriku ===
- Nagoya University Hospital w:ja:名古屋大学医学部附属病院
- Nagoya City University Hospital w:ja:名古屋市立大学病院
- Gifu University Hospital w:ja:岐阜大学医学部附属病院

=== Kinki ===
- Kyoto University Hospital w:ja:京都大学医学部附属病院
- Kyoto Prefectural University of Medicine Hospital w:ja:京都府立医科大学附属病院
- University of Fukui Hospital w:ja:福井大学医学部附属病院
- Osaka University Hospital w:ja:大阪大学医学部附属病院
- Osaka University Dental Hospital w:ja:大阪大学歯学部附属病院
- Osaka City University Hospital w:ja:大阪市立大学医学部附属病院
- Kindai University Hospital w:ja:近畿大学医学部附属病院
- Kobe University Hospital w:ja:神戸大学医学部附属病院
- Wakayama Medical University Hospital w:ja:和歌山県立医科大学附属病院

=== Chugoku and Shikoku ===
- Kagawa University Hospital w:ja:香川大学医学部附属病院
- Okayama University Hospital w:ja:岡山大学病院
- Tokushima University Hospital w:ja:徳島大学病院

=== Kyūshū ===
- Kagoshima University Hospital w:ja:鹿児島大学病院
- Kumamoto University Hospital w:ja:熊本大学医学部附属病院
- Kurume University Hospital w:ja:久留米大学病院
- Kyūshū University Hospital w:ja:九州大学病院
- Nagasaki University Hospital w:ja:長崎大学病院
- Saga University Hospital w:ja:佐賀大学医学部附属病院

== Jordan ==
- King Abdullah University Hospital, Irbid
- University of Jordan Hospital, Amman

== Kenya ==
- Aga Khan University Hospital, Nairobi
- Kenyatta University Teaching, Referral and Research Hospital, Nairobi

== Latvia ==
- Riga Eastern University Hospital, Riga
- Pauls Stradins Clinical University Hospital, Riga
- Children's Clinical University Hospital, Riga

== Lebanon ==
- Saint Georges Hospital – University Medical Center – Saint George University of Beirut – Beirut
- American University of Beirut Medical Center (AUBMC) – Beirut
- University Medical Center-Rizk Hospital – Beirut
- Hammoud Hospital University Medical Center – Saida
- Rafik Hariri University Hospital – Jnah
- Zahraa University Hospital – Beirut
- Centre Hospitalier Universitaire Notre Dame des Secours – Byblos
- Hotel Dieu de France, Centre Hospitalier Universitaire – Beirut

== Macau ==
- Macau University of Science and Technology Hospital

== Malaysia ==
- University Malaya Medical Centre
- Universiti Kebangsaan Malaysia Medical Centre
- University of Science, Malaysia Medical Centre, Kubang Kerian, Kelantan
- International Islamic University Malaysia Medical Centre, Kuantan, Pahang
- Sultan Abdul Aziz Shah Hospital, Serdang, Selangor
- Universiti Teknologi MARA Medical Centre, Puncak Alam, Selangor

== Malta ==
- Mater Dei Hospital, Msida

== Mexico ==
- Hospital Civil de Guadalajara, Universidad de Guadalajara
- Hospital San José Tec de Monterrey, ITESM
- Centro Médico Zambrano Hellion, Monterrey ITESM
- Hospital Universitario Dr. José Eleuterio González, Monterrey UANL
- Hospital Central "Dr. Ignacio Morones Prieto", Secretaria de Salud, San Luis Potosí, S.L.P.
- Hospital Universitario de Saltillo "Dr. Gonzalo Valdés Valdés". Saltillo, Coahuila – UAdeC.
- Hospital Universitario de Torreón "Dr. Joaquín del Valle Sánchez". Torreón, Coahuila – UAdeC.
- Hospital Infantil Universitario de Torreón. Torreón, Coahuila – UAdeC
- Instituto Nacional de Ciencias Médicas y Nutrición Salvador Zubirán. Ciudad de México-UNAM
- Hospital General de México Dr. Eduardo Liceaga. Ciudad de México-UNAM
- Hospital General Dr. Manuel Gea González. Ciudad de México-UNAM
- Centro Médico ABC. Ciudad de México-UNAM

== Mongolia ==
- Mongolia–Japan Hospital of MNUMS

== Netherlands ==
- Amsterdam University Medical Centers (Amsterdam UMC), merger of:
  - Academic Medical Center (AMC), Amsterdam (University of Amsterdam)
  - VU University Medical Center (VUmc), Amsterdam (Vrije Universiteit Amsterdam))
- University Medical Center Groningen (UMCG), Groningen (University of Groningen)
- Leiden University Medical Center (LUMC), Leiden (Leiden University)
- Maastricht University Medical Center+ (MUMC+), Maastricht (Maastricht University)
- Radboud University Medical Center (Radboudumc), Nijmegen (Radboud University Nijmegen))
- Erasmus University Medical Center (Erasmus MC), Rotterdam (Erasmus University Rotterdam)
- University Medical Center Utrecht (UMCU), Utrecht (Utrecht University)

== Nepal ==
- Tribhuvan University Teaching Hospital, Tribhuvan University
- B.P. Koirala Institute of Health Sciences

== New Zealand ==
- Auckland City Hospital
- Christchurch Hospital
- Dunedin Public Hospital
- Middlemore Hospital
- North Shore Hospital
- Starship Children's Health
- Waikato Hospital
- Wellington Hospital, New Zealand

== Nigeria ==
- Delta State University Teaching Hospital (DELSUTH), Oghara, Delta State
- Lagos University Teaching Hospital (LUTH), Idiaraba, Lagos State
- Olabisi Onabanjo University Teaching Hospital, Sagamu (OOUTH), Sagamu, Ogun State
- University College Hospital, Ibadan (UCH), Oyo State
- University of Nigeria Teaching Hospital, Enugu (UNTH), Enugu State
- University of Ilorin Teaching Hospital, Ilorin, (UITH), Kwara State,
- University of Maiduguri Teaching Hospital, Maiduguri, (UMTH), Borno State
- Jos University Teaching Hospital, Jos (JUTH), Plateau State
- Usmanu Danfodiyo University Teaching Hospital, Sokoto, (UDUTH), Sokoto State,
- University of Uyo Teaching Hospital Akwa-Ibom State
- Nnamdi Azikiwe University Teaching Hospital, Nnewi, Anambra
- University of Calabar Teaching Hospital (UCTH), Calabar
- Ebonyi State University Teaching Hospital
- University of Benin Teaching Hospital, Benin City
- Irrua Specialist Teaching Hospital, Irrua
- Enugu State University Teaching Hospital Parklane Enugu
- Imo State University Teaching Hospital (IMSUTH), Orlu
- Ahmadu Bello University Teaching Hospital, Shika, Zaria
- Aminu Kano Teaching Hospital, Kano
- Lagos State University Teaching Hospital (LASUTH), Ikeja, Lagos
- Ladoke Akintola University Teaching Hospital, Osogbo
- University of Port Harcourt Teaching Hospital (UPTH), Port Harcourt
- Obafemi Awolowo University Teaching Hospital, Ile-Ife

== Norway ==
- Akershus University Hospital, Lørenskog (University of Oslo)
- Haukeland University Hospital, Bergen (University of Bergen)
- Oslo University Hospital, Oslo (University of Oslo)
  - Aker University Hospital, Oslo (University of Oslo)
  - Rikshospitalet, Oslo (University of Oslo)
  - Ullevål University Hospital, Oslo (University of Oslo)
- Gaustad Hospital, Oslo (University of Oslo)
- St. Olavs University Hospital, Trondheim (Norwegian University of Science and Technology)
- University Hospital of North Norway, Tromsø (University of Tromsø)
- Stavanger University Hospital, Stavanger (University of Bergen, University of Stavanger)

== Pakistan ==
- Ayub Teaching Hospital attached to Ayub Medical College, Abbottabad
- Aga Khan University Hospital attached to Aga Khan University, Karachi
- Baqai University Hospital, Karachi
- Dr. Ziauddin University Hospital, Karachi
- Bolan Medical Complex Hospital attached to Bolan University of Medical & Health Sciences, Quetta
- Liaquat University Hospital, Jamshoro, Sindh (Liaquat University of Medical and Health Sciences Jamshoro)- Also known as Civil Hospital. (It is one of the oldest in Asia.
- Mayo Hospital attached to the King Edward Medical College, Lahore
- Jinnah Hospital attached to Allama Iqbal Medical College, Lahore
- Military Hospital attached to Army Medical college
- University Dental Hospital, Lahore attached to UCD, University of Lahore
- University Teaching Hospital, Lahore attached to UCM, University of Lahore
- Combined Military Hospital attached to CMH Medical and Dental College, Lahore
- Bahawal Victoria Hospital, Bahawalpur attached to Quaid e Azam University
- Farooq Hospital attached to Akhtar Saeed Medical and Dental College

== Philippines ==
- Angeles University Foundation Medical Center, Angeles University Foundation, Angeles, Pampanga
- Capitol University Medical City, Capitol University, Cagayan de Oro
- De La Salle Medical and Health Sciences Institute, Dasmariñas
- Fatima Medical Center, Our Lady of Fatima University, Valenzuela
- Far Eastern University – Nicanor Reyes Medical Foundation, Quezon City
- Manila Central University Hospital, Caloocan
- Manila Doctors Hospital, Manila Tytana Colleges
- Maria Reyna Xavier University Hospital, Xavier University – Ateneo de Cagayan, Cagayan de Oro
- Olivarez General Hospital, Olivarez College, Parañaque
- Philippine General Hospital, University of the Philippines Manila
- Saint Louis University Hospital of the Sacred Heart, Baguio
- St. Paul University Manila – St. Paul Hospital (formerly known as Jose P. Rizal Hospital and National Medical Research Center), Cavite
- UERMMMC, University of the East, Quezon City
- University of Santo Tomas Hospital, Manila
- Aquinas University Hospital, Legazpi city, Albay
- West Visayas State University Medical Center, Iloilo City

== Portugal ==
- Braga's Hospital (Hospital de Braga), Braga
- St John's University Hospital Center (Centro Hospitalar Universitário de São João), Porto
- Porto's Hospital (Centro Hospitalar Universitário do Porto), Porto
- Coimbra University Hospital Center (Centro Hospitalar Universitário de Coimbra), Coimbra
- Cova da Beira University Hospital Center (Centro Hospitalar Universitário Cova da Beira), Covilhã
- North Lisbon University Hospital Center (Centro Hospitalar Universitário de Lisboa Norte), Lisbon
- Central Lisbon University Hospital Center (Centro Hospitalar Universitário de Lisboa Central), Lisbon
- Algarve University Hospital Center (Centro Hospitalar Universitário do Algarve), Algarve

== Singapore ==
- National University Hospital – Yong Loo Lin School of Medicine, National University of Singapore
- Singapore General Hospital – Duke–NUS Medical School, National University of Singapore
- Tan Tock Seng Hospital – Lee Kong Chian School of Medicine, Nanyang Technological University

== Spain ==
=== Andalucía ===
==== Almería ====
- Hospital Torrecárdenas

==== Barcelona ====
- Hospital Clinic de Barcelona

==== Cádiz ====
- Hospital Jerez de la Frontera
- Hospital La Línea
- Hospital Puerta del Mar
- Hospital Puerto Real

=== Canary Islands ===
- Hospital Universitario de Canarias
- Hospital Universitario Nuestra Señora de Candelaria
- Hospital Universitario Insular de Gran Canaria

=== Cantabria ===
- Hospital Universitario Marqués de Valdecilla

=== Castelló de la Plana ===
- Hospital General Universitari de Castellón (Castellon General University Hospital)

==== Córdoba ====
- Hospital Universitario Reina Sofía de Córdoba

==== Granada ====
- Hospital Universitario Virgen de las Nieves
- Hospital Clínico San Cecilio

==== Huelva ====
- Hospital Juan Ramón Jimenez

==== Jaén ====
- Complejo Hospitalario de Jaén

==== Málaga ====
- Hospital Carlos Haya
- Hospital Clínico de Málaga

==== Sevilla ====
- Hospital virgen del rocio
- Hospital Virgen de Valme
- Hospital Virgen de Macarena

==== Reus ====
- Hospital Universitari Sant Joan de Reus

==== Tarragona ====
- Hospital Universitari de Tarragona Joan XXIII

=== Madrid ===
- Hospital Universitario Fundación Alcorcón, Alcorcón
- Hospital de La Princesa
- Hospital Infantil Universitario Niño Jesús
- University Hospital Moncloa
- Hospital Universitario Rey Juan Carlos, Móstoles
- Hospital Universitario de Móstoles, Móstoles
- HM Hospital Universitario Puerta del Sur, Móstoles
- Hospital Universitario Quironsalud Madrid, Pozuelo de Alarcón

==== Complutense University of Madrid ====
- Hospital Universitario 12 de Octubre
- Hospital Clínico Universitario San Carlos
- Hospital General Universitario Gregorio Maranon
- Hospital Universitario Ramón y Cajal
- Hospital Universitario La Paz

==== Autonomous University of Madrid ====
- Centro Superior de Estudios Universitarios La Salle.
- Enfermería de la Comunidad de Madrid
- Enfermería de la Cruz Roja
- Enfermería de la Fundación Jiménez Díaz
- Hospital Universitario Fundación Jiménez Díaz
- Enfermería La Paz
- Enfermería Puerta de Hierro
- Hospital Universitario Puerta de Hierro, Majadahonda
- Fisioterapia de la ONCE

=== Murcia ===
- Hospital Universitario Santa María del Rosell
- Hospital Universitario Virgen de la Arrixaca
- Hospital General Universitario Reina Sofía de Murcia
- Hospital Morales Meseguer

=== Navarre ===
- Clínica Universidad de Navarra, Facultad de Medicina

=== Sant Joan d'Alacant ===
- Hospital Universitario San Juan De Alicante

=== Valencian Community ===
==== Alicante ====
- Hospital Universitario San Juan De Alicante

==== Valencia ====
- Consorci Hospital General Universitari de València
- Hospital Universitari i Politècnic La Fe

== Somalia ==
- Bardera Polytechnic, Bardera
- Edna Maternity Hospital, Hargeisa

== South Africa ==
- Groote Schuur Hospital, Cape Town
- Pretoria Academic Hospital, Pretoria (renamed Steve Biko Hospital in 2008)
- Tygerberg Hospital, Bellville
- Charlotte Maxeke Johannesburg Academic Hospital, Johannesburg
- Universitas Hospital, Bloemfontein
- King Edward VIII Hospital, Durban
- Dr George Mukhari Hospital, Ga-Rankuwa
- Nelson Mandela Academic Hospital, Mthatha
- Mankweng Polokwane Hospital complex, Mthatha

== South Korea ==
=== Seoul ===
- Seoul National University Hospital, Seoul National University
- Sinchon Yonsei Severance Hospital, Yonsei University
- Gangnam Yonsei Severance Hospital, Yonsei University
- Samsung Medical Center, Sungkyunkwan University
- Asan Medical Center, Ulsan University
- Seoul St. Mary's Hospital, Catholic University of Korea
- Yeouido St. Mary's Hospital, Catholic University of Korea
- Gangnam CHA Medical Center, CHA University
- St. Paul's Hospital, Catholic University of Korea
- Konkuk University Hospital, Konkuk University
- Hanyang University Hospital, Hanyang University
- Ewha Womans University Hospital, Ewha Womans University
- Soonchunhyang University Seoul Hospital, Soonchunhyang University
- Eulji Medical Center, Eulji University
- Seoul Paik's Hospital, Inje University
- Sanggye Paik's Hospital, Inje University
- Korea University Anam Hospital, Korea University
- Korea University Guro Hospital, Korea University
- Hangang Seongsim Hospital, Hallym University
- Seoul Seongsim Hospital, Hallym University
- Gangdong Seongsim Hospital, Hallym University
- Kyung Hee Medical Center, Kyung Hee University
- Gangdong Kyung Hee Medical Center, Kyung Hee University

=== Busan ===
- Pusan National University Hospital, Pusan National University
- Dong-a University Hospital, Dong-a University
- Gospel Hospital, Kosin University
- Dong-eui Medical Center, Dong-eui University
- Busan Paik's Hospital, Inje University
- Haeundae Paik's Hospital, Inje University

=== Daegu ===
- Kyungpook National University Hospital, Kyungpook National University
- Chilgok Kyungpook National University Hospital, Kyungpook National University
- Yeungnam University Hospital, Yeungnam University
- Catholic University of Daegu Hospital, Catholic University of Daegu
- Dongsan Medical Center, Keimyung University
- Daegu CHA Woman Hospital, CHA University

=== Incheon ===
- Incheon St. Mary's Hospital, Catholic University of Korea
- Inha University Hospital, Inha University,
- Gil Medical Center, Gachon University
- International St. Mary's Hospital, Catholic Kwandong University

=== Gwangju ===
- Chonnam National University Hospital, Chonnam National University
- Chosun University Hospital, Chosun University

=== Daejeon ===
- Chungnam National University Hospital, Chungnam National University
- Eulji University Hospital, Eulji University
- Daejeon St. Mary's Hospital, Catholic University of Korea
- Konyang University Hospital, Konyang University

=== Ulsan ===
- Ulsan University Hospital, Ulsan University

=== Gyeonggi Province ===
- Ajou University Hospital, Ajou University, Suwon
- St. Vincent Hospital, Catholic University of Korea, Suwon
- Ilsan Paik's Hospital, Inje University, Goyang
- Dongguk University Ilsan Hospital, Goyang
- Bundang CHA Medical Center, CHA University, Seongnam
- Bundang CHA Woman Hospital, CHA University, Seongnam
- Ilsan CHA Medical Center, CHA University, Ilsan
- Bundang Seoul University Hospital, Seoul National University, Seongnam
- Yongin Yonsei Severance Hospital, Yonsei University, Yongin
- Bucheon St. Mary's Hospital, Catholic University of Korea, Bucheon
- Soonchunhyang University Bucheon Hospital, Soonchunhyang University, Bucheon
- Korea University Ansan Hospital, Ansan
- Seongsim Hospital, Hallym University, Anyang
- Dongtan Seongsim Hospital, Hallym University, Hwaseong
- Guri Hanyang University Hospital, Hanyang University, Guri
- Uijeongbu St. Mary's Hospital, Catholic University of Korea, Uijeongbu

=== Gangwon Province ===
- Chuncheon Sungsim Hospital, Hallym University, Chuncheon
- Kangwon National University Hospital, Kangwon National University, Chuncheon
- Gangneung Asan Hospital, Ulsan University, Gangneung
- Wonju Severance Christian Hospital, Yonsei University, Wonju

=== Chungcheong Province ===
- Dankook University Hospital, Dankook University, Cheonan
- Soonchunhyang University Hospital, Soonchunhyang University. Cheonan
- Chungbuk National University Hospital, Chungbuk National University, Cheongju
- Konkuk University Chungju Hospital, Konkuk University, Chungju

=== Jeolla Province ===
- Jeonbuk National University Hospital, Jeonbuk National University, Jeonju
- Wonkwang University Hospital, Wonkwang University, Iksan
- Hwasun Chonnam National University Hospital, Chonnam National University, Hwasun County

=== Gyeongsang Province ===
- Yangsan Pusan National University Hospital, Pusan National University
- Gyeongsang National University Hospital, Gyeongsang National University, Jinju
- Changwon Gyeongsang National University, Gyeongsang National University, Changwon
- Changwon Samsung Hospital, Sungkyunkwan University, Changwon
- Gumi CHA Medical Center, Cha University, Gumi
- Dongguk University Gyeongju Hospital, Dongguk University, Gyeongju
- Yeongcheon Yeungnam University Hospital, Yeungnam University, Yeongcheon

=== Jeju Province ===
- Jeju National University Hospital, Jeju National University, Jeju

== South Sudan ==
- Juba Teaching Hospital

== Sri Lanka ==
- Karapitiya Teaching Hospital
- Lady Ridgeway Hospital for Children
- Teaching Hospital, Peradeniya
- Jaffna Teaching Hospital
- Batticaloa Teaching Hospital

== Sweden ==
- Karolinska University Hospital, Huddinge and Solna
- Rosenlund Hospital, Stockholm (Karolinska Institute)
- St. Eriks Eye Hospital, Stockholm (Karolinska Institute)
- Uppsala University Hospital, Uppsala
- Norrland's University Hospital, Umeå
- Sahlgrenska University Hospital, Gothenburg
- Örebro University Hospital, Örebro
- Skåne University Hospital, Malmö and Lund
  - Orupssjukhuset, Höör
- Linköping University Hospital, Linköping
- Danderyds sjukhus, Stockholm
- Hallands sjukhus, Halmstad (Lund University, University of Copenhagen)
- Vrinnevisjukhuset, Norrköping (Linköping University)
- Helsingborgs lasarett, Helsingborg (Lund University)

== Switzerland ==
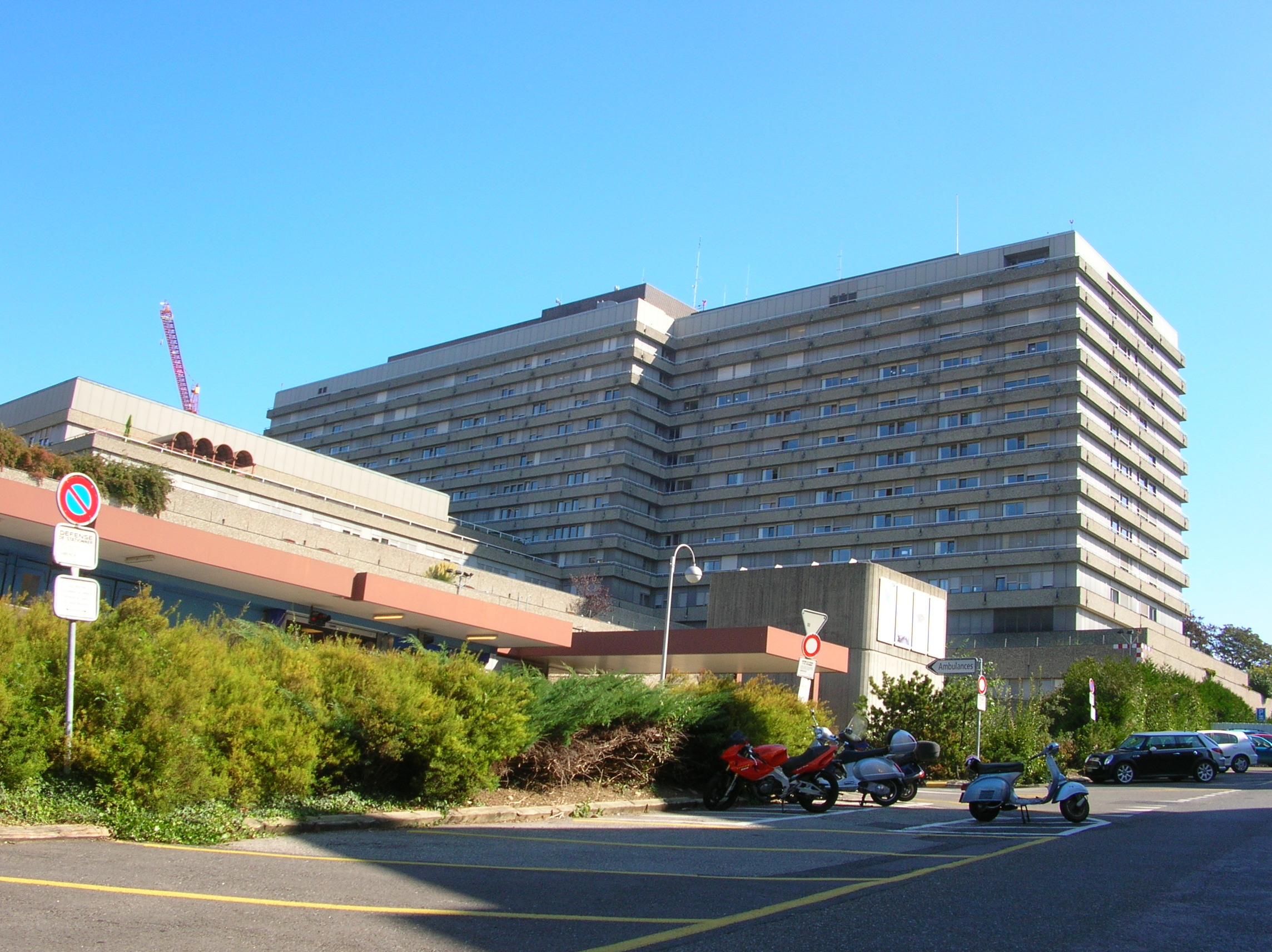
The main building of the University Hospital of Lausanne (CHUV).

There are six university hospitals in Switzerland:

- University Hospital of Basel (USB), Basel
- University Hospital of Bern (Inselspital), Bern
- University Hospital of Geneva (HUG), Geneva
- University Hospital of Lausanne (CHUV), Lausanne
- Kantonsspital, Lucerne
- University Children's Hospital, Zurich
- University Hospital of Zürich (USZ), Zürich
- Balgrist University Hospital, Zürich

== Syria ==
=== Damascus University ===
Damascus university runs eight hospitals in the city of Damascus:

- Al Assad University Hospital
- Al Mouwasat University Hospital
- Obstetrics & Gynecology University Hospital
- Cardiac Surgery University Hospital
- Dermatology & Venereal Diseases University Hospital
- Children's University Hospital
- Al Bairouni University Hospital
- Oral Maxillofacial Surgery Hospital

=== Aleppo University ===
Currently, the university runs 5 hospitals in the city of Aleppo:

- Aleppo University Hospital (AUH)
- Aleppo University Cardiovascular Surgical Centre
- OB/GYN Hospital named after Basil al-

Assad

- Al-Kindi Hospital
- Oral and Maxillofacial Surgical Centre

=== Tishreen University- Lattakia ===
- Tishreen university hospital-Lattakia
- Chemotherapy &Radiotherapy centre -Lattakia

== Turkey ==
Note: All of the affiliated hospitals are owned and operated by the Ministry of Health, where the hospital staff is employed by either the university or the Ministry. Such hospitals are affiliated with the University of Health Sciences unless otherwise stated/linked. For city hospitals, see the list of city hospitals in Turkey.

=== Istanbul ===
==== Public ====
===== University-owned =====
- Istanbul University-Cerrahpasa Hospital
- Istanbul University Hospital
- Istanbul University Oncology Institute
- Istanbul University Cardiology Institute
- Marmara University Institute of Neurological Sciences
- Marmara University Gastroenterology Institute

===== Affiliate =====
- Bağcılar Training and Research Hospital
- Başakşehir Çam and Sakura City Hospital
- Istanbul Training and Research Hospital
- Marmara University Prof. Dr. Asaf Ataseven Hospital
- Marmara University Pendik Training and Research Hospital

==== Private ====
- Istanbul Medipol University Mega Hospital

=== Ankara ===
==== Public ====
===== University-owned =====
- Ankara University İbni Sina Hospital
- Gazi University Hospital
- Hacettepe University Hospital
- Hacettepe University İhsan Doğramacı Children's Hospital

===== Affiliate =====
- Ankara Bilkent City Hospital
- Sincan Training and Research Hospital

==== Private ====
- Başkent University Ankara Hospital
- Lokman Hekim University Hospital

=== İzmir ===
==== Public ====
===== University-owned =====
- Ege University Hospital
- Dokuz Eylül University Hospital

===== Affiliate =====
- Bozyaka Training and Research Hospital
- Çiğli Training and Research Hospital (affiliated with İzmir Bakırçay University)
- Dr. Behçet Uz Pediatric Diseases and Surgery Training and Research Hospital
- İzmir City Hospital
- Tepecik Training and Research Hospital

==== Private ====
- İzmir University of Economics Medicalpoint Hospital

=== Antalya ===
- Akdeniz University Hospital (public, university-owned)
- Antalya Training and Research Hospital (public, affiliate)
- Alanya Training and Research Hospital (public, affiliated with Alanya Alaaddin Keykubat University)

=== Konya ===
- Selçuk University Hospital (public, university-owned)
- Necmettin Erbakan University Meram Hospital (public, university-owned)
- Konya Training and Research Hospital (public, affiliate)
- Konya Beyhekim Training and Research Hospital (public, affiliate)
- Başkent University Konya Hospital (private)

=== Adana ===
- Çukurova University Hospital
- Başkent University Adana Hospital

=== Eskişehir ===
- Eskişehir Osmangazi University Hospital
- Eskişehir City Hospital

=== Kocaeli ===
- Kocaeli University Hospital (public, university-owned)
- Kocaeli City Hospital (public, affiliate)

=== Malatya ===
- İnönü University Turgut Özal Medical Center
- Malatya Training and Research Hospital

=== Trabzon ===
- Karadeniz Technical University Farabi Hospital
- Trabzon Kanuni Training and Research Hospital

=== Şanlıurfa ===
- Harran University Hospital

=== Other cities ===
- Amasya Sabuncuoğlu Şerefeddin Training and Research Hospital (affiliated with Amasya University)
- Atatürk University Research Hospital (Yakutiye-Aziziye)
- Aydın Adnan Menderes University Hospital
- Çanakkale Onsekiz Mart University Hospital
- Manisa Celal Bayar University Hafsa Sultan Hospital
- Hatay Mustafa Kemal University Hospital
- Kafkas University Hospital
- Kahramanmaraş Sütçü İmam University Hospital
- Mersin University Hospital
- Muğla Training and Research Hospital (affiliated with Muğla Sıtkı Koçman University)
- Osmaniye Training and Research Hospital
- Rize Recep Tayyip Erdoğan University Training and Research Hospital
- Sivas Cumhuriyet University Hospital
- Tekirdağ Namık Kemal University Hospital
- Tokat Gaziosmanpaşa University Hospital
- Uşak Training and Research Hospital (affiliated with Uşak University)
- Yozgat Bozok University Hospital
- Zonguldak Bülent Ecevit University Hospital

== Taiwan ==
- Buddhist Tzu Chi General Hospital – Tzu Chi University, Hualien
- Chung-Ho Memorial Hospital – Kaohsiung Medical University, Kaohsiung
- Fu Jen Catholic University Hospital – Fu Jen Catholic University, New Taipei
- Linkou Chang Gung Memorial Hospital – Chang Gung University, New Taipei
- National Cheng Kung University Hospital – National Cheng Kung University, Tainan
- National Taiwan University Hospital – National Taiwan University, Taipei
- National Yang Ming Chiao Tung University Hospital – National Yang Ming Chiao Tung University, Yilan
- Taipei Medical University Hospital – Taipei Medical University, Taipei

== Thailand ==
=== Bangkok ===
- Chulabhon Hospital – HRH Princess Chulabhorn College of Medical Science
- King Chulalongkorn Memorial Hospital – Chulalongkorn University (Affiliated with Thai Red Cross Society)
- Phramongkutklao Hospital – Phramongkutklao College of Medicine
- Ramathibodi Hospital – Faculty of Medicine Ramathibodi Hospital, Mahidol University
- Siriraj Hospital – Faculty of Medicine Siriraj Hospital, Mahidol University
- Hospital for Tropical Diseases – Faculty of Tropical Medicine, Mahidol University
- Vajira Hospital – Faculty of Medicine Vajira Hospital, Navamindradhiraj University

=== Chiang Mai ===
- Maharaj Nakorn Chiang Mai Hospital – Chiang Mai University

=== Chiang Rai ===
- Mae Fah Luang University Hospital – Mae Fah Luang University

=== Chon Buri ===
- Burapha University Hospital – Burapha University

=== Khon Kaen ===
- Srinagarindra Hospital – Khon Kaen University

=== Mahasarakham ===
- Suddhavej Hospital – Mahasarakham University

=== Nakhon Nayok ===
- HRH Princess Maha Chakri Sirindhorn Medical Center – Srinakharinwirot University

=== Nakhon Pathom ===
- Golden Jubilee Medical Center – Faculty of Medicine Siriraj Hospital, Mahidol University

=== Nakhon Ratchasima ===
- Suranaree University of Technology Hospital – Suranaree University of Technology

=== Nakhon Srithammarat ===
- Walailak University Hospital Center – Walailak University

=== Narathiwat ===
- Galyanivadhanakarun Hospital – Princess of Naradhiwas University

=== Nonthaburi ===
- Panyananthaphikkhu Chonprathan Medical Center – Srinakharinwirot University

=== Pathum Thani ===
- Thammasat University Hospital – Thammasat University

=== Phitsanulok ===
- Naresuan University Hospital – Naresuan University

=== Samut Prakan ===
- Chakri Naruebodindra Medical Institute – Faculty of Medicine Ramathibodi Hospital, Mahidol University

=== Songkhla ===
- Songklanagarind Hospital – Prince of Songkla University

== Tunisia ==
=== Tunis ===
- University Hospital La Rabta, Tunis – Tunis El Manar University, Medicine School of Tunis
- University Hospital Charles-Nicolle, Tunis – Tunis El Manar University, Medicine School of Tunis
- Military University Hospital, Tunis – Tunis El Manar University, Medicine School of Tunis
- University Hospital Mongi-Slim of La Marsa, Tunis – Tunis El Manar University, Medicine School of Tunis
- University Hospital Habib-Thameur of Montfleury, Tunis – Tunis El Manar University, Medicine School of Tunis

=== Nabeul ===
- University Hospital Taher-Maamouri, Nabeul – Tunis El Manar University, Medicine School of Tunis

=== Bizerte ===
- University Hospital of Bizerte, Bizerte – Tunis El Manar University, Medicine School of Tunis

=== Sousse ===
- University Hospital Sahloul, Sousse – University of Sousse, Faculty of Medecine Ibn El Jazzar of Sousse
- University Hospital Farhat-Hached, Sousse – University of Sousse, Faculty of Medecine Ibn El Jazzar of Sousse

=== Monastir ===
- University Hospital Fattouma-Bourguiba, Monastir – University of Monastir, Faculty of Medecine of Monastir
- Clinical University Hospital of dentistry, Monastir – University of Monastir, Faculty of Dental Medicine of Monastir

=== Mahdia ===
- University Hospital Tahar-Sfar, Mahdia – University of Monastir, Faculty of Medecine of Monastir

=== Sfax ===
- University Hospital Hédi-Chaker, Sfax – University of Sfax, Faculty of Medecine of Sfax
- University Hospital Habib-Bourguiba, Sfax – University of Sfax, Faculty of Medecine of Sfax

== United Kingdom ==
=== Aberdeen ===
- NHS Grampian :
  - Aberdeen Royal Infirmary – University of Aberdeen
  - Aberdeen Maternity Hospital – University of Aberdeen
  - Royal Aberdeen Children's Hospital – University of Aberdeen
  - Woodend Hospital – University of Aberdeen
  - Royal Cornhill Hospital – University of Aberdeen

=== Aberystwyth ===
- Bronglais Hospital – University of Aberystwyth

=== Airdrie ===
- Monklands Hospital – University of Glasgow

=== Ayr ===
- University Hospital Ayr – University of Glasgow

=== Bebington, Wirral ===
- Clatterbridge Hospital – University of Liverpool

=== Belfast ===
- Belfast City Hospital
- Mater Infirmorum Hospital
- Royal Victoria Hospital

=== Birmingham ===
- Heart of England NHS Foundation Trust :
  - Good Hope Hospital – University of Birmingham Medical School, University of Birmingham
  - Heartlands Hospital
- Midland Metropolitan University Hospital
- Queen Elizabeth Hospital Birmingham
- Solihull Hospital
- City Hospital, Birmingham

=== Blackpool ===
- Blackpool Victoria Hospital

=== Bradford ===
- Bradford Royal Infirmary – Leeds School of Medicine, University of Leeds, University of Bradford
- St Luke's Hospital, Bradford – Leeds School of Medicine, University of Leeds, University of Bradford

=== Brighton ===
- Royal Sussex County Hospital – Brighton and Sussex Medical School, University of Sussex, University of Brighton

=== Bristol ===
- Frenchay Hospital – Bristol Medical School, University of Bristol
- Southmead Hospital – Bristol Medical School, University of Bristol
- Bristol Royal Hospital for Children – Bristol Medical School, University of Bristol
- Bristol Royal Infirmary – Bristol Medical School, University of Bristol

=== Cambridge ===
- Cambridge University Hospitals NHS Foundation Trust
  - Addenbrooke's Hospital
  - Rosie Hospital
  - Saffron Walden Community Hospital

=== Cardiff ===
- University Hospital of Wales – Cardiff University School of Medicine, Cardiff University
- Noah's Ark Children's Hospital for Wales – Cardiff University School of Medicine, Cardiff University
- University Dental Hospital, Cardiff – Cardiff University School of Medicine, Cardiff University
- University Hospital Llandough – Cardiff University School of Medicine, Cardiff University

=== Carlisle ===
- Cumberland Infirmary – Newcastle University Medical School, Newcastle University
- West Cumberland Hospital – Newcastle University Medical School, Newcastle University

=== Chelmsford ===
- Broomfield Hospital

=== Chertsey ===
- St Peter's Hospital (Imperial College London; St George's, University of London)

=== Clydebank ===
- Golden Jubilee University National Hospital

=== Coventry ===
- University Hospital Coventry – Warwick Medical School, University of Warwick

=== Craigavon, Northern Ireland ===
- Craigavon Area Hospital

=== Derby ===
- Royal Derby Hospital

=== Derry, Northern Ireland ===
- Altnagelvin Area Hospital

=== Dumfries ===
- Dumfries and Galloway Royal Infirmary – University of Glasgow, University of the West of Scotland (UWS)

=== Dundonald, Northern Ireland ===
- Ulster Hospital

=== Durham ===
- University Hospital of North Durham – Newcastle University, Durham University

=== Dundee ===
- Ninewells Hospital – University of Dundee
- Tayside Children's Hospital

=== East Kilbride ===
- Hairmyres Hospital – University of Glasgow, University of the West of Scotland, Glasgow Caledonian University

=== Edinburgh ===
- Lauriston Building
- Royal Infirmary of Edinburgh – University of Edinburgh Medical School, University of Edinburgh
- Western General Hospital – University of Edinburgh Medical School, University of Edinburgh
- Royal Hospital for Sick Children – University of Edinburgh Medical School, University of Edinburgh
- St John's Hospital, Livingston – University of Edinburgh Medical School, University of Edinburgh

=== Elgin ===
- Dr Gray's Hospital

=== Enniskillen, Northern Ireland ===
- South West Acute Hospital

=== Exeter ===
- Royal Devon and Exeter Hospital – Peninsula Medical School, University of Exeter, University of Plymouth

=== Falkirk ===
- Falkirk & District Royal Infirmary – University of Glasgow

=== Gateshead ===
- Queen Elizabeth Hospital – Newcastle University Medical School, Newcastle University

=== Glasgow ===
- Glasgow Dental Hospital and School
- Glasgow Royal Infirmary – University of Glasgow
- Gartnavel General Hospital – University of Glasgow
- Gartnavel Royal Hospital – University of Glasgow
- Leverndale Hospital – University of Glasgow
- New Victoria Hospital – University of Glasgow
- Parkhead Hospital – University of Glasgow
- Princess Royal Maternity Hospital – University of Glasgow
- Queen Elizabeth University Hospital – University of Glasgow
- Royal Hospital for Children – University of Glasgow
- Stobhill Hospital – University of Glasgow
- Victoria Integrated Care Centre, Helensburgh – University of Glasgow
- Southern General Hospital – University of Glasgow
- Western Infirmary – University of Glasgow

=== Great Yarmouth ===
- James Paget University Hospital – University of East Anglia Medical School, University of East Anglia

=== Greenock ===
- Inverclyde Royal Hospital – University of Glasgow

=== Hartlepool ===
- University Hospital of Hartlepool

=== Haywards Heath ===
- Princess Royal Hospital

=== Kilmarnock ===
- Crosshouse Hospital – University of Glasgow, University of the West of Scotland (UWS)

=== Kingston upon Hull ===
- Hull Royal Infirmary – Hull York Medical School, University of Hull
- Castle Hill Hospital – Hull York Medical School, University of Hull

=== Inverness, Scotland ===
- Raigmore Hospital – University of Aberdeen

=== Irvine ===
- Ayrshire Central Hospital – University of Glasgow

=== Lancaster, England ===
- Royal Lancaster Infirmary

=== Leeds ===
- St James's University Hospital, Leeds – University of Leeds
- Leeds General Infirmary – University of Leeds

=== Leicester ===
- Leicester Royal Infirmary – Leicester Medical School, University of Leicester
- Leicester General Hospital – Leicester Medical School, University of Leicester
- Glenfield Hospital – Leicester Medical School, University of Leicester

=== Liverpool ===
- Aintree University Hospitals NHS Foundation Trust:
  - Aintree University Hospital
- The Walton Centre for Neurology and Neurosurgery
- Alder Hey Children's NHS Foundation Trust:
  - Alder Hey Children's Hospital, University of Liverpool
- Liverpool Heart and Chest Hospital NHS Foundation Trust:
  - Liverpool Heart and Chest Hospital, University of Liverpool
- Liverpool Women's NHS Foundation Trust :
  - Liverpool Women's Hospital, University of Liverpool
- Royal Liverpool University Hospital, University of Liverpool
- Broadgreen Hospital, University of Liverpool
- St Helens & Knowsley Teaching Hospitals NHS Trust, University of Liverpool :
  - Whiston Hospital
  - St Helens Hospital
- Wirral University Teaching Hospital NHS Foundation Trust, University of Liverpool

=== Livingston, Scotland ===
- St John's Hospital, Livingston

=== London ===
- Barking, Havering and Redbridge University Hospitals NHS Trust :
  - Queen's Hospital
  - King George Hospital
- Barts Health NHS Trust :
  - Royal London Hospital – Barts and The London School of Medicine and Dentistry, University of London
  - St Bartholomew's Hospital – Barts and The London School of Medicine and Dentistry, University of London
  - Newham University Hospital – Barts and The London School of Medicine and Dentistry, University of London
  - Whipps Cross University Hospital – Barts and The London School of Medicine and Dentistry, University of London
- Central Middlesex Hospital – Imperial College School of Medicine
- Imperial College Healthcare NHS Trust :
  - Charing Cross Hospital – Imperial College School of Medicine, University of London
  - Hammersmith Hospital – Imperial College School of Medicine
  - Queen Charlotte's and Chelsea Hospital
  - St Mary's Hospital, London – Imperial College School of Medicine, University of London
- Chelsea and Westminster Hospital NHS Foundation Trust :
  - Chelsea and Westminster Hospital – Imperial College School of Medicine, University of London
  - West Middlesex University Hospital – Imperial College School of Medicine, University of London
- University College London Hospitals NHS Foundation Trust
  - Eastman Dental Hospital – UCL Medical School
  - Hospital for Tropical Diseases
  - National Hospital for Neurology and Neurosurgery
  - Royal London Hospital for Integrated Medicine
  - Royal National Throat, Nose and Ear Hospital – UCL Medical School
  - University College Hospital – UCL Medical School, University of London; UCL Partners
  - University College Hospital at Westmoreland Street – UCL Medical School
  - UCH Macmillan Cancer Centre – UCL Medical School
  - University College Hospital at Westmoreland Street – UCL Medical School
- Great Ormond Street Hospital for Children NHS Foundation Trust :
  - Great Ormond Street Hospital – UCL Medical School, University of London; UCL Partners
- Guy's and St Thomas' NHS Foundation Trust :
  - Guy's Hospital – King's College London, University of London
  - King's College Hospital – King's College London, University of London
  - St Thomas' Hospital – King's College London, University of London
- Homerton University Hospital NHS Foundation Trust :
  - Homerton University Hospital
- Croydon Health Services NHS Trust :
  - Croydon University Hospital – University of London
- Moorfields Eye Hospital NHS Foundation Trust :
  - Moorfields Eye Hospital – University of London
- Queen Mary's Hospital, Sidcup – University of London
- Royal Free Hospital – UCL Medical School, University of London; UCL Partners
- London North West Healthcare NHS Trust :
  - St Mark's Hospital – UCL Medical School
  - Northwick Park Hospital
  - Central Middlesex Hospital
  - Ealing Hospital
- St George's Hospital – St. George's, University of London
- University Hospital Lewisham – King's College London, University of London
- Whittington Hospital – UCL Medical School, University of London

=== Luton ===
- Luton and Dunstable University Hospital NHS Foundation Trust :
  - Luton and Dunstable University Hospital – UCL Medical School

=== Manchester ===
- Manchester University NHS Foundation Trust
  - Manchester Royal Eye Hospital
  - Manchester Royal Infirmary – University of Manchester
  - Royal Manchester Children's Hospital
  - Saint Mary's Hospital, Manchester
  - University Dental Hospital of Manchester
  - Trafford General Hospital
- North Manchester General Hospital – University of Manchester
- University Hospital of South Manchester – University of Manchester

=== Middlesbrough ===
- James Cook University Hospital

=== Milton Keynes ===
- Milton Keynes University Hospital – University of Buckingham

=== Newcastle upon Tyne ===
- Royal Victoria Infirmary – Newcastle University Medical School, Newcastle University
- Freeman Hospital-Newcastle University Medical School, Newcastle University
- Great North Children's Hospital, Newcastle University
- St Nicholas Hospital, Newcastle upon Tyne

=== Newry, Northern Ireland ===
- Daisy Hill Hospital

=== Norwich ===
- Norfolk and Norwich University Hospital – University of East Anglia Medical School, University of East Anglia

=== Northamptonshire ===
- Northampton General Hospital – University of Northampton, University of Leicester
- Kettering General Hospital – University of Northampton, University of Leicester

=== Northumberland ===
- Wansbeck General Hospital – Newcastle University Medical School, Newcastle University

=== Nottingham ===
- Queen's Medical Centre – University of Nottingham
- Nottingham City Hospital – University of Nottingham

=== Oxford ===
- John Radcliffe Hospital – Oxford University
- Churchill Hospital – Oxford University
- Warneford Hospital – Oxford University

=== Paisley ===
- Dykebar Hospital – University of Glasgow
- Royal Alexandra Hospital – University of Glasgow

=== Plymouth ===
- Derriford Hospital – Peninsula Medical School, University of Plymouth

=== Portsmouth ===
- Portsmouth Hospitals University NHS Trust
  - Queen Alexandra Hospital – University of Portsmouth
  - Gosport War Memorial Hospital
  - Fareham Community Hospital
  - St. Mary's Community Health Campus
  - Petersfield Hospital
  - Oak Park Community Clinic

=== Redhill ===
- East Surrey Hospital – Brighton and Sussex Medical School

=== Salford ===
- Salford Royal NHS Foundation Trust

=== Sandwell ===
- Sandwell General Hospital

=== Sheffield ===
- Royal Hallamshire Hospital – University of Sheffield, Sheffield Hallam University
- Northern General Hospital – University of Sheffield, Sheffield Hallam University
- Sheffield Children's Hospital – University of Sheffield, Sheffield Hallam University

=== Shrewsbury ===
- Royal Shrewsbury Hospital

=== Southampton ===
- University Hospital Southampton NHS Foundation Trust :
  - Southampton General Hospital – Southampton Medical School, University of Southampton
  - Princess Anne Hospital
  - Royal South Hants Hospital

=== South Shields ===
- South Tyneside District Hospital – Newcastle University Medical School, Newcastle University

=== Stirling ===
- Stirling Royal Infirmary – University of Glasgow

=== Steeton with Eastburn ===
- Airedale General Hospital – Leeds School of Medicine

=== Stockton-on-Tees ===
- University Hospital of North Tees

=== Stoke-on-Trent ===
- Royal Stoke University Hospital – Keele University Medical School, Keele University

=== Swansea ===
- Morriston Hospital – Swansea University School of Medicine, Swansea University
- Singleton Hospital – Swansea University School of Medicine, Swansea University

=== Tees Valley ===
- Darlington Memorial Hospital – Newcastle University Medical School, Durham University, Newcastle University
- James Cook University Hospital – University of Teesside, Newcastle University Medical School, Durham University, Newcastle University
- University Hospital of Hartlepool – Newcastle University Medical School, Newcastle University
- University Hospital of North Tees- Newcastle University Medical School, Newcastle University

=== Telford ===
- Princess Royal Hospital, Telford

=== Truro ===
- Royal Cornwall Hospital – Peninsula Medical School, University of Exeter, University of Plymouth

=== Upton, Merseyside ===
- Wirral Women and Children's Hospital

=== Wishaw ===
- University Hospital Wishaw – University of Glasgow, University of the West of Scotland (UWS), Glasgow Caledonian University (GCU)

=== Worksop ===
- Bassetlaw District General Hospital – University of Sheffield

=== Wrexham ===
- North Wales Regional Hospital – Wrexham Medical Institute, Glyndwr University

=== York ===
- York Hospital – University of York

== United States ==
=== Alaska ===
==== Anchorage ====
- Providence Alaska Medical Center

=== Alabama ===
- Marshall Medical Center South, Boaz, Alabama
- South Baldwin Regional Medical Center, Foley, Alabama
- UAB Health Center – Selma

==== Birmingham ====
- University of Alabama Hospitals (UAB) – University of Alabama School of Medicine
- Kirklin Clinic – University of Alabama School of Medicine
- UAB Callahan Eye Hospital – University of Alabama School of Medicine
- Children's Hospital of Alabama – University of Alabama School of Medicine
- UAB Highlands
- St. Vincent's East, Birmingham
- Brookwood Baptist Health System, Birmingham, Alabama
  - Princeton Baptist Medical Center

==== Dothan ====
- Southeast Alabama Medical Center

==== Huntsville ====
- Huntsville Hospital System – University of Alabama School of Medicine

==== Mobile ====
- University of South Alabama Medical Center – University of South Alabama College of Medicine
- University of South Alabama Children's and Women's Hospital
- Mobile Infirmary – University of South Alabama – University of South Alabama College of Medicine

==== Montgomery ====
- UAB Health Center – Montgomery – University of Alabama School of Medicine
  - Baptist Medical Center South

==== Phenix City ====
- Jack Hughston Memorial Hospital

==== Tuscaloosa ====
- UAB Health Center – Tuscaloosa – University of Alabama School of Medicine

=== Arizona ===
- North Country HealthCare, Flagstaff, Arizona
- Honor Health, Scottsdale, Arizona
- Yuma Regional Medical Center

==== Phoenix ====
- Banner – University Medical Center Phoenix – University of Arizona College of Medicine – Phoenix
- Valleywise Health – University of Arizona College of Medicine & Mayo Medical School
  - Arizona Burn Center
- Dignity Health St. Joseph's Hospital and Medical Center – University of Arizona College of Medicine & Creighton University School of Medicine
- Mayo Clinic
- Phoenix Children's Hospital

==== Tucson ====
- Banner – University Medical Center Tucson – University of Arizona College of Medicine – Tucson
- Banner – University Medical Center South – University of Arizona College of Medicine – Tucson

=== Arkansas ===
- White River Health System, Batesville, Arkansas
- Unity Health-White County Medical Center, Searcy, Arkansas
- Baptist Health, North Little Rock, Arkansas
- Veterans Health Care System of the Ozarks

==== Fayetteville ====
- Washington Regional Medical Center – UAMS College of Medicine

==== Little Rock ====
- Arkansas Children's Hospital – UAMS College of Medicine
- Central Arkansas Veterans Health Care System – UAMS College of Medicine
- University of Arkansas for Medical Sciences/UAMS Medical Center – UAMS College of Medicine

=== California ===
- Kaiser Permanente
  - Fontana Medical Center, Fontana, California
  - Ontario, California
- VA Palo Alto Health Care System

==== Bakersfield ====
- Kern Medical Center – David Geffen School of Medicine at UCLA

==== Beverly Hills, California ====
- Keck Medical Center of USC Beverly Hills – Keck School of Medicine of USC

==== Colton, California ====
- Arrowhead Regional Medical Center – Loma Linda University School of Medicine, UC Irvine School of Medicine, California State University, San Bernardino, Crafton Hills College, Western University of Health Sciences, Touro University California

==== Downey, California ====
- Downey Regional Medical Center – Western University of Health Sciences
- Rancho Los Amigos National Rehabilitation Center

==== Duarte ====
- City of Hope National Medical Center

==== Fairfield ====
- David Grant USAF Medical Center

==== French Camp ====
- San Joaquin General Hospital

==== Fresno ====
- Community Regional Medical Center – UC San Francisco School of Medicine

==== Glendale ====
- USC Verdugo Hills Hospital – Keck School of Medicine of USC
- Glendale Adventist Medical Center

==== Inglewood ====
- Centinela Hospital Medical Center

==== La Cañada Flintridge ====
- Keck Medicine – La Cañada Flintridge – Keck School of Medicine of USC

==== Loma Linda ====
- Loma Linda University Medical Center

==== Long Beach ====
- College Medical Center – Western University of Health Sciences & Touro University California
- Long Beach Memorial Medical Center

==== Los Angeles ====
- Cedars-Sinai Medical Center – Keck School of Medicine of USC & David Geffen School of Medicine at UCLA
- Children's Hospital Los Angeles – Keck School of Medicine of USC
- Good Samaritan Hospital (Los Angeles)
- Hollywood Presbyterian Medical Center – CHA University
- Kaiser Permanente Southern California – Los Angeles Medical Center
- Keck Hospital of USC, Los Angeles – Keck School of Medicine of USC
- Keck Medicine, Downtown Los Angeles – Keck School of Medicine of USC
- Los Angeles County-USC Medical Center – Keck School of Medicine of USC
- Martin Luther King Jr. Community Hospital – UCLA School of Medicine
- Olive View-UCLA Medical Center – Sylmar
- Resnick Neuropsychiatric Hospital at UCLA – UCLA School of Medicine
- Ronald Reagan UCLA Medical Center – UCLA School of Medicine
- USC Norris Comprehensive Cancer Center and Hospital – Keck School of Medicine of USC
- White Memorial Medical Center

==== Moreno Valley ====
- Riverside County Regional Medical Center – UC Riverside School of Medicine, Loma Linda University School of Medicine & Western University of Health Sciences

==== Murrieta ====
- Loma Linda University Medical Center – Murrieta – Murrieta

==== Oakland ====
- Children's Hospital Oakland – UC San Francisco School of Medicine
- Highland Hospital – UC San Francisco School of Medicine

==== Orange ====
- UCI Medical Center – UC Irvine School of Medicine
- Children's Hospital of Orange County

==== Palm Springs ====
- Desert Regional Medical Center

==== Palo Alto ====
- Lucile Packard Children's Hospital – Stanford University School of Medicine
- Stanford University Medical Center – Stanford University School of Medicine
- VA Palo Alto Health Care System – Stanford Medical School

==== Pasadena ====
- Keck Medicine – Pasadena – Keck School of Medicine of USC
- Huntington Hospital

==== Pomona ====
- Pomona Valley Hospital Medical Center – Keck School of Medicine of USC & Western University of Health Sciences

==== Riverside ====
- Riverside County Regional Medical Center

==== Sacramento ====
- UC Davis Medical Center – UC Davis School of Medicine

==== Salinas ====
- Natividad Medical Center – UC San Francisco School of Medicine

==== San Diego ====
- UC San Diego Medical Center, Hillcrest – UC San Diego School of Medicine
- Jacobs Medical Center – UC San Diego School of Medicine
- Naval Medical Center San Diego
- Moores Cancer Center
- Kaiser Permanente, San Diego Medical Center

==== San Francisco ====
- San Francisco General Hospital (UCSF) – UC San Francisco School of Medicine
- UCSF Medical Center – UC San Francisco School of Medicine
- UCSF Medical Center at Mission Bay, (Mission Bay neighborhood) – UC San Francisco School of Medicine
- UCSF Mount Zion Medical Center
- California Pacific Medical Center
- San Francisco VA Medical Center
- Langley Porter Psychiatric Institute
- University of California, San Francisco Fetal Treatment Center

==== San Jose ====
- Santa Clara Valley Medical Center – Stanford Medical School

==== Santa Barbara ====
- Santa Barbara Cottage Hospital

==== Santa Monica ====
- UCLA Medical Center, Santa Monica – UCLA Medical School

==== Torrance ====
- Harbor–UCLA Medical Center

==== Ventura ====
- Community Memorial Hospital of San Buenaventura
- Ventura County Medical Center

==== Visalia ====
- Kaweah Delta Medical Center – UC Irvine School of Medicine

==== Willowbrook ====
- Martin Luther King Jr. Community Hospital

=== Colorado ===
==== Aurora ====
- University of Colorado Hospital- University of Colorado School of Medicine
- Children's Hospital Colorado

==== Broomfield ====
- UCHealth Broomfield Hospital

==== Colorado Springs ====
- UCHealth Grandview Hospital

==== Denver ====
- Denver Health Medical Center – University of Colorado School of Medicine
- National Jewish Health – University of Colorado School of Medicine
- Denver Veteran's Affairs Medical Center – University of Colorado School of Medicine
- Rose Medical Center
- St. Joseph Hospital

==== Pueblo ====
- UCHealth Parkview Medical Center

=== Connecticut ===
==== Bridgeport ====
- St. Vincent's Medical Center – Frank H. Netter M.D. School of Medicine at Quinnipiac University

==== Danbury ====
- Danbury Hospital (Yale University School of Medicine, New York Medical College, Ross University School of Medicine, University of Vermont College of Medicine), American University of the Caribbean

==== Derby ====
- Griffin Hospital – Frank H. Netter M.D. School of Medicine at Quinnipiac University; Yale University School of Medicine

==== Fairfield ====
- Jewish Senior Services, The Jewish Home – Frank H. Netter M.D. School of Medicine at Quinnipiac University

==== Farmington ====
- UConn Health Center – University of Connecticut School of Medicine

==== Greenwich ====
- Greenwich Hospital (Yale University School of Medicine; New York Medical College)

==== Hartford ====
- Connecticut Children's Medical Center – Frank H. Netter M.D. School of Medicine at Quinnipiac University
- Hartford Hospital – University of Connecticut School of Medicine
- St. Francis Hospital – University of Connecticut School of Medicine

==== Meriden ====
- MidState Medical Center – Frank H. Netter M.D. School of Medicine at Quinnipiac University

==== Middletown ====
- Middlesex Hospital Connecticut – Frank H. Netter M.D. School of Medicine at Quinnipiac University

==== New London ====
- Lawrence+Memorial Hospital (Yale-New Haven Health System)

==== New Haven ====
- Yale-New Haven Hospital – Yale School of Medicine
- Hospital of Saint Raphael – Yale School of Medicine

==== Norwalk ====
- Norwalk Hospital – Yale University School of Medicine, New York Medical College

==== Putnam ====
- Day Kimball Hospital

==== Stamford ====
- Stamford Hospital

==== Wallingford ====
- Gaylord Specialty Healthcare- Frank H. Netter M.D. School of Medicine at Quinnipiac University
- Masonicare – Frank H. Netter M.D. School of Medicine at Quinnipiac University
- Waterbury Hospital – Frank H. Netter M.D. School of Medicine at Quinnipiac University

==== Waterbury ====
- St. Mary's Hospital – Yale University School of Medicine
- Waterbury Hospital Health Center

=== Delaware ===
- Christiana Care Health System (Sidney Kimmel Medical College)
  - Christiana Hospital – Newark
  - Middletown Emergency Department – Middletown
  - Wilmington Hospital – Wilmington
- Nemours Children's Hospital, Delaware, Wilmington (Sidney Kimmel Medical College)

=== Florida ===
- Halifax Health, Daytona Beach
- Naples Community Hospital
- JFK Medical Center, Atlantis
- Bay Pines VA Hospital

==== Boynton Beach, Florida ====
- Bethesda Health

==== Chattahoochee ====
- Florida State Hospital, Florida State University College of Medicine

==== Fort Lauderdale ====
- Broward Health, Nova Southeastern University College of Osteopathic Medicine
  - Broward Health Medical Center

==== Gainesville ====
- UF Health at the University of Florida
- J. Hillis Miller Health Science Center, University of Florida
- UF Health Shands Hospital, University of Florida
- University of Florida Cancer Hospital

==== Hollywood ====
- Memorial Health Care System, Florida International University

==== Jacksonville ====
- UF Health Jacksonville, University of Florida
- Mayo Clinic
- Nemours Foundation
- Wolfson Children's Hospital
- VA Jacksonville Outpatient Clinic

==== Largo ====
- Largo Medical Center

==== Marianna ====
- Jackson Hospital, Florida State University College of Medicine

==== Miami ====
- Baptist Hospital of Miami, Florida International University
- Jackson Memorial Hospital, Miller School of Medicine, University of Miami
- Mercy Hospital, Florida International University, Miami
- Miami Children's Hospital, Florida International University, Miami
- University of Miami Hospital, University of Miami
- Bascom Palmer Eye Institute, Miller School of Medicine
- Aventura Hospital and Medical Center
- Kendall Regional Medical Center
- Nicklaus Children's Hospital

==== Miami Beach ====
- Jackson North Hospital, Florida International University
- Mount Sinai Medical Center & Miami Heart Institute, Florida International University

==== Naples, Florida ====
- NCH Healthcare System

==== Orlando, Florida ====
- Florida Hospital Medical Center
- Orlando Health
  - Orlando Regional Medical Center
  - Orlando Health UF Health Cancer Center
  - Arnold Palmer Hospital for Children
  - Nemours Children's Hospital
  - Winnie Palmer Hospital for Women & Babies
  - Dr. P. Phillips Hospital
  - South Seminole Hospital

==== Port St. Lucie, Florida ====
- St. Lucie Medical Center

==== Sarasota ====
- Sarasota Memorial Health Care System (Florida State University College of Medicine)

==== St. Petersburg ====
- Bayfront Health St. Petersburg
- Johns Hopkins All Children's Hospital

==== South Miami ====
- Larkin Community Hospital

==== Tallahassee ====
- Tallahassee Memorial HealthCare (Florida A & M University, Florida State University)

==== Tampa ====
- Tampa General Hospital, University of South Florida Morsani College of Medicine
- Florida Hospital, Tampa
- James A. Haley VA Hospital, Tampa
- Moffitt Cancer Center

==== Weston ====
- Cleveland Clinic

==== West Palm Beach ====
- St. Mary's Hospital
- Broward Health, Florida International University
- Cleveland Clinic Foundation Florida, Florida International University
- West Palm Beach VA

=== Georgia ===
- Dwight D. Eisenhower Army Medical Center
- Northeast Georgia Medical Center, Gainesville
- Emory University Orthopaedics and Spine Hospital, Tucker, Georgia
- Gwinnett Medical Center, Lawrenceville & Duluth

==== Albany ====
- Phoebe Putney Memorial Hospital

==== Athens ====
- Piedmont Athens Regional

==== Atlanta ====
- Emory University Hospital
- Grady Memorial Hospital, staffed by Emory & Morehouse Medical Schools
- Emory University Hospital-Midtown
- Atlanta Veterans Affairs Medical Center
- Children's Healthcare of Atlanta
- Atlanta Medical Center
- Saint Joseph's Hospital (Atlanta)

==== Augusta ====
- Augusta University Medical Center
- University Hospital (Augusta, Georgia)

==== Brunswick ====
- Southeast Georgia Health System

==== Columbus ====
- St. Francis Hospital (Columbus, Georgia)

==== Decatur ====
- Emory's Hope Clinic

==== Macon ====
- Medical Center of Central Georgia

==== Savannah ====
- Memorial Health University Medical Center
- St. Joseph's/Candler Health System

=== Hawaii ===
- The Queen's Medical Center, Honolulu
- Tripler Army Medical Center
- Kapiolani Medical Center for Women and Children
- Straub Medical Center
- Pali Momi Medical Center
- Kuakini Medical Center
- Wahiawa General Hospital
- Kaiser Foundation Hospital
- VA Pacific Islands Health Care System
- Shriners Hospitals for Children

=== Idaho ===
- Boise VA Medical Center
- Eastern Idaho Regional Medical Center, Idaho Falls, Idaho
- Kootenai Health, Coeur d'Alene, Idaho

=== Illinois ===
- Edward Hines Jr. Veterans Administration Hospital, Hines (Loyola University Medical School)
- Advocate Christ Medical Center, Oak Lawn, Illinois
- Carle Foundation Hospital, Urbana, Illinois
- Pana Community Hospital, Pana

==== Aurora ====
- Rush–Copley Medical Center

==== Carlinville ====
- Carlinville Area Hospital, Carlinville, Illinois

==== Chicago ====
- Advocate Illinois Masonic Medical Center(University of Illinois)
- Advocate Lutheran General Hospital – Midwestern University, Rosalind Franklin University, University of Illinois
- Jesse Brown VA Medical Center
- John H. Stroger, Jr. Hospital of Cook County
- Anne & Robert H. Lurie Children's Hospital of Chicago – Northwestern University
- Mercy Hospital and Medical Center(University of Illinois)
- Mount Sinai Medical Center (Rosalind Franklin University of Medicine and Science and University of Chicago)
- Northwestern Memorial Hospital
- Norwegian American Hospital
- Rehabilitation Institute of Chicago
- Rush University Medical Center
- University of Chicago Medical Center
- University of Illinois Hospital & Health Sciences System
- Presence Resurrection Medical Center
- Presence Saint Joseph Hospital(University of Illinois)
- Presence Saints Mary and Elizabeth Medical Center
- Provident Hospital (Chicago)
- Riverside Medical Center
- Schwab Rehabilitation Hospital
- Sinai Children's Hospital
- Swedish Covenant Hospital
- The University of Illinois Eye and Ear Infirmary

==== Decatur ====
- St. Mary's Hospital
- Decatur Memorial Hospital

==== Evanston ====
- NorthShore University HealthSystem
- Presence Saint Francis Hospital(University of Illinois)

==== Harvey ====
- Ingalls Memorial Hospital

==== Lake Forest ====
- Northwestern Lake Forest Hospital

==== Maywood ====
- Loyola University Medical Center
- Edward Hines, Jr. VA Hospital

==== North Chicago ====
- Captain James A. Lovell Federal Health Care Center (Rosalind Franklin University of Medicine and Science)

==== Peoria ====
- OSF Saint Francis Medical Center
- The Children's Hospital of Illinois (CHOI) and St. Jude Midwest Affiliate at OSF Saint Francis

==== Rockford ====
- Swedish American Hospital
- OSF Saint Anthony Medical Center

==== Springfield ====
- Memorial Medical Center
- St. John's Hospital
- St. John Children's Hospital
- Erie Family Health Center
- Advocate BroMenn Medical Center

==== Wheaton ====
- Marianjoy Rehabilitation Hospital and Clinics (Feinberg School of Medicine)

==== Winfield, Illinois ====
- Central DuPage Hospital

=== Indiana ===
==== Avon ====
- Indiana University Health West Hospital

==== Bedford ====
- Indiana University Health Bedford Hospital

==== Bloomington ====
- Indiana University Health Bloomington Hospital

==== Carmel ====
- Indiana University Health North Hospital
- Riley Hospital for Children at Indiana University Health North Hospital

==== Fishers ====
- Indiana University Health Saxony Hospital

==== Frankfort ====
- Indiana University Health Frankfort Hospital

==== Gary ====
- MacNeal Hospital
- Methodist Hospital

==== Hartford City ====
- Indiana University Health Blackford Hospital

==== Indianapolis ====
- Indiana University Health Methodist Hospital
- Indiana University Health University Hospital
- IU Health North Medical Center
- Riley Hospital for Children at Indiana University Health
- Larue D. Carter Memorial Hospital
- Richard L. Roudebush VA Medical Center
- Sidney & Lois Eskenazi Hospital

==== Knox ====
- Starke Hospital

==== Lafayette ====
- Indiana University Health Arnett Hospital
- Indiana University Health Arnett Hospital Hospice

==== La Porte ====
- La Porte Hospital

==== Monticello ====
- Indiana University Health White Memorial Hospital

==== Muncie ====
- Ball Memorial Hospital

==== Paoli ====
- Indiana University Health Paoli Hospital

==== Portland ====
- Indiana University Health Jay Hospital

==== Terre Haute ====
- Union Hospital (Indiana)

==== Tipton ====
- Indiana University Health Tipton Hospital

=== Iowa ===
==== Cedar Rapids ====
- St. Luke's Hospital (Cedar Rapids, Iowa)

==== Decorah ====
- Winneshiek Medical Center

==== Des Moines ====
- Mercy Medical Center – Des Moines
- Iowa Methodist medical Center

==== Iowa City ====
- University of Iowa Hospitals and Clinics
- University of Iowa Children's Hospital – Iowa City, Iowa

==== Sioux City ====
- St. Luke's Regional Medical Center (Sioux City, Iowa)

=== Kansas ===
- Ascension Via Christi Health
- Menorah Medical Center, Overland Park, Kansas

==== Kansas City ====
- University of Kansas Hospital
- University of Kansas Medical Center

==== Salina ====
- Salina Regional Health Center

==== Topeka ====
- University of Kansas Health System St. Francis Campus

==== Wichita ====
- Wesley Medical Center
- Wichita VA Medical Center

=== Kentucky ===
- Our Lady of Bellefonte Hospital
- Pikeville Medical Center

==== Lexington ====
- Albert B. Chandler Hospital, University of Kentucky
- Eastern State Hospital, University of Kentucky
- Good Samaritan Hospital, University of Kentucky
- Kentucky Children's Hospital, University of Kentucky
- Lexington VA Medical Center
- Saint Joseph Hospital (Lexington, Kentucky)
- University of Kentucky Children's Hospital

==== Louisville ====
- James Graham Brown Cancer Center
- Jewish Hospital & St. Mary's Healthcare
- Kosair Children's Hospital
- University of Louisville Hospital
- VA Medical Center
- Norton Healthcare

=== Louisiana ===
==== Baton Rouge ====
- Our Lady of the Lake Regional Medical Center (Our Lady of the Lake College, Louisiana State University, Tulane University and Southern University)
- Baton Rouge General Medical Center – Mid-City Campus
- Baton Rouge General Medical Center – Bluebonnet Campus

==== Houma ====
- Leonard J Chabert Medical Center (LSU)

==== Lafayette ====
- University Hospitals and Clinics (LSU)
- Lafayette General Medical Center

==== Metairie ====
- East Jefferson General Hospital

==== New Orleans ====
- Ochsner Medical Center
- Tulane Medical Center
  - Tulane University Hospital and Clinic
  - Tulane–Lakeside Hospital
  - Tulane Hospital for Children
  - Tulane Cancer Center
  - Tulane Abdominal Transplant
  - Tulane-Lakeside Women's Center
  - Tulane Multispecialty Center Metairie
  - Tulane Multispecialty Center uptown
  - Tulane Multispecialty Center Downtown
  - Tulane Institute for Sports Medicine
- University Medical Center (Louisiana State University School of Medicine, Tulane University School of Medicine)
  - Charity Hospital
  - University Hospital

==== Shreveport ====
- University Health Sciences Center Shreveport

=== Maine ===
- Central Maine Medical Center, Lewiston
- Eastern Maine Medical Center, Bangor
- Maine Medical Center, Portland, Maine
- Barbara Bush Children's Hospital

=== Maryland ===
==== Annapolis, Maryland ====
- Anne Arundel Medical Center

==== Baltimore ====
- Johns Hopkins Hospital, Baltimore
- Johns Hopkins Children's Center, Baltimore
- Johns Hopkins Bayview Medical Center, Baltimore
- University of Maryland Medical Center, Baltimore
  - R Adams Cowley Shock Trauma Center
- University of Maryland Medical Center Midtown Campus
- University of Maryland Rehabilitation & Orthopaedic Institute
- Mt. Washington Pediatric Hospital
- St. Agnes Hospital (Baltimore)
- MedStar Harbor Hospital
- MedStar Union Memorial Hospital
- Kennedy Krieger Institute
- MedStar Good Samaritan Hospital
- Sinai Hospital

==== Bethesda ====
- Suburban Hospital, Bethesda
- Walter Reed National Military Medical Center, Bethesda
- National Institutes of Health
- National Institutes of Health Clinical Center

==== Columbia ====
- Howard County General Hospital, Columbia

==== Glen Burnie ====
- University of Maryland Baltimore Washington Medical Center

==== Laurel, Maryland ====
- University of Maryland Laurel Regional Hospital

==== La Plata ====
- University of Maryland Charles Regional Medical Center

==== Salisbury ====
- Peninsula Regional Medical Center

==== Towson, Maryland ====
- University of Maryland St. Joseph Medical Center
- Greater Baltimore Medical Center

=== Massachusetts ===
- Edith Nourse Rogers Memorial Veterans Hospital, Bedford
- McLean Hospital, Belmont
- Beverly Hospital, Beverly
- Cambridge Health Alliance
- Franciscan Children's Hospital & Rehab. Center, Brighton
- Brockton Hospital, Brockton
- Bournewood Hospital, Brookline
- Human Resource Institute, Brookline
- Lahey Hospital and Medical Center, Burlington
- Clinton Hospital, Clinton
- Carney Hospital, Dorchester
- CHA Everett Hospital
- Health Alliance Hospital, Fitchburg
- MetroWest Medical Center, Framingham & Natick, Massachusetts
- Harvard Pilgrim Health Care
- Lawrence General Hospital
- Health Alliance Hospital, Leominster
- Bay Ridge Hospital, Lynn
- Marlborough Hospital, Marlborough
- Milford Regional Medical Center
- Newton-Wellesley Hospital
- VA Central Western Massachusetts Healthcare System, Northampton (University of Massachusetts Medical School)
  - Northampton VA Medical Center
- Norwood Hospital, Norwood
- Wing Memorial Hospital, Palmer
- Berkshire Medical Center, Pittsfield, Massachusetts
- Quincy Medical Center, Quincy
- Hebrew Senior Life, Roslindale
- North Shore Children's Hospital, Salem
- Spaulding Rehabilitation Hospital, Sandwich
- Harrington Memorial Hospital Southbridge
- Baystate Medical Center, Springfield
- Morton Hospital and Medical Center, Taunton, Massachusetts
- Westwood Lodge Hospital, Westwood
- UMass Memorial Medical Center, Worcester

==== Boston ====
- Beth Israel Deaconess Medical Center, Boston
- Boston Children's Hospital, Boston
- Boston Medical Center, Boston
- VA Boston Healthcare System (Harvard Medical School, Boston University School of Medicine)
- Brigham and Women's Hospital, Boston
- Brigham and Women's Faulkner Hospital, Boston
- Carney Hospital, Boston
- Dana–Farber Cancer Institute, Boston
- Floating Hospital for Children
- Joslin Diabetes Center, Boston
- Massachusetts Eye and Ear Infirmary, Boston
- Massachusetts General Hospital, Boston
- Massachusetts Mental Health Center, Boston
- New England Baptist Hospital, Boston
- St. Elizabeth's Medical Center (Boston)
- Schepens Eye Research Institute, Boston
- Tufts Medical Center, Boston

==== Cambridge ====
- Cambridge Hospital, Cambridge
- Mount Auburn Hospital, Cambridge

=== Michigan ===
- Butterworth Hospital, Grand Rapids (Spectrum Health)
- Detroit Medical Center, Detroit
  - Children's Hospital of Michigan
  - Detroit Receiving Hospital
  - Harper University Hospital
  - Heart Hospital and Harper Specialty Center
  - Huron Valley-Sinai Hospital
  - Hutzel Women's Hospital
  - DMC Surgery Hospital
  - Rehabilitation Institute of Michigan
  - Sinai-Grace Hospital
- Henry Ford Hospital
- Bronson Methodist Hospital, Kalamazoo, Michigan (Michigan State University, Western Michigan University)
- St. Mary's of Michigan Medical Center, Saginaw (Michigan State University College of Human Medicine; Central Michigan University)
- Sparrow Hospital, Michigan State University, Lansing
- MidMichigan Medical Center-Midland (Michigan State University College of Human Medicine, Central Michigan University; family medicine residency program is affiliated with Michigan State University)
- Marquette General Hospital (Michigan State University College of Human Medicine)
- University of Michigan Health System, Ann Arbor
  - C.S. Mott Children's Hospital
  - University Hospital
  - Von Voigtlander Women's Hospital
- William Beaumont Hospital, Grosse Pointe
- William Beaumont Hospital, Royal Oak
- William Beaumont Hospital, Troy
- Genesys Regional Medical Center, Grand Blanc, Michigan
- St. John Hospital and Medical Center, Detroit
- Oakwood South Shore Hospital, Trenton, Michigan
- Metropolitan Hospital, Grand Rapids
- Henry Ford Wyandotte Hospital, Wyandotte, Michigan
- POH – Regional Medical Center, Pontiac, Michigan
- Garden City Hospital, Garden City
- McLaren Macomb Medical Center, Mount Clemens, Michigan
- St. John Oakland Hospital, Madison Heights, Michigan
- Botsford General Hospital, Farmington Hills, Michigan
- Henry Ford Macomb Hospital, Clinton Township, Macomb County, Michigan
- Lakeland Health, St. Joseph, Michigan
- Covenant HealthCare, Saginaw, Michigan
- St. Mary's of Michigan, Saginaw, Michigan (Michigan State University College of Human and Central Michigan University)
- Providence Park Hospital/MSUCHM, Southfield
- Ascension Macomb-Oakland Hospital, Warren, Michigan
- Munson Medical Center, Traverse City, Michigan (Michigan State University College of Human Medicine, Michigan State University College of Osteopathic Medicine)
- MSUCOM
  - Mercy Health – Hackley Campus, Muskegon, Michigan
  - ProMedica Monroe Regional Hospital, Monroe
  - St. Mary Mercy, Livonia

=== Minnesota ===
- University of Minnesota Medical Center, Minneapolis
  - University of Minnesota Medical Center, East Bank
- University of Minnesota Masonic Children's Hospital
- Hennepin County Medical Center (HCMC), Minneapolis
- Minneapolis Veteran's Administration Hospital, Minneapolis
- Mayo Medical School, Rochester
- Mayo Clinic Health System – Albert Lea
- Mayo Clinic Health System – Austin
- Mayo Clinic Health System – Cannon Falls
- Mayo Clinic Health System – Fairmont
- Fairview University Medical Center – Mesabi, Hibbing
- Mayo Clinic Health System – Lake City
- Mayo Clinic Health System – Mankato
- Mayo Clinic Health System – Owatonna
- Mayo Clinic Health System – Springfield
- St. Cloud Hospital
- Mayo Clinic Health System – St. James
- Regions Hospital, Saint Paul
- St. Joseph's Hospital (St. Paul, Minnesota), HelthEast – University of Minnesota _ University of Minnesota's Family Practice Resident Program
- Children's St. Paul Pediatric Hospital, St. Paul
- St. John's Hospital, HealthEast (St.Paul) – University of Minnesota's Family Practice Resident Program
- United Hospital (United Family Medicine Residency Program)
- Mayo Clinic Health System – Waseca
- Cuyuna Regional Medical Center, Crosby
- Abbott Northwestern Hospital, Minneapolis
- Fairview Southdale Hospital, Edina, Minnesota

=== Mississippi ===
- University of Mississippi Medical Center, Jackson
- University Hospital and Clinics – Holmes County, Lexington

=== Missouri ===
- University Health Truman Medical Center, Kansas City
- University Health Lakewood Medical Center, Kansas City
- Children's Mercy Hospital, Kansas City
- Western Missouri Mental Health Center, Kansas City
- Saint Luke's Hospital, Kansas City
- Saint Luke's Northland, Kansas City
- Baptist-Lutheran Medical Center, Kansas City
- Barnes-Jewish Hospital, St. Louis
- Cardinal Glennon Children's Hospital, St. Louis
- Rehabilitation Institute of St. Louis
- St. Louis Children's Hospital, St. Louis
- Saint Louis University Hospital, St. Louis
- Harry S. Truman Memorial Veterans' Hospital, Columbia
- University of Missouri Health Care, Columbia
  - Columbia Regional Hospital
  - University of Missouri Children's Hospital
  - University of Missouri Hospital
  - University of Missouri Women's and Children's Hospital
  - Ellis Fischel Cancer Center
- Washington University Medical Center, St. Louis
- Barnes-Jewish St. Peters Hospital, St. Peters
- Barnes-Jewish West County Hospital
- Boone Hospital Center, Columbia
- Freeman Health System, Joplin
- Research Medical Center, Kansas City

=== Montana ===
- Billings Clinic, Billings
- Benefis Health System, Great Falls

=== Nebraska ===
- Creighton University Medical Center, Omaha
- Nebraska Medical Center, Omaha

=== Nevada ===
- Valley Hospital Medical Center, Las Vegas
- Saint Mary's Regional Medical Center, Reno (University of Nevada, Reno School of Medicine)
- Boulder City Hospital, Boulder City (UNLV School of Medicine)
- Renown Regional Medical Center, Reno (University of Nevada, Reno School of Medicine)
- Sunrise Hospital & Medical Center, Winchester, Nevada
- University Medical Center of Southern Nevada, Las Vegas
- Northern Nevada Medical Center, Sparks
- VA Southern Nevada Healthcare System, North Las Vegas

=== New Hampshire ===
- Dartmouth-Hitchcock Medical Center, Lebanon
  - Norris Cotton Cancer Center
  - Cheshire Medical Center
- Southern New Hampshire Health System, Nashua
- Concord Hospital (New Hampshire), Concord
- Manchester VA Medical Center (Dartmouth Medical College)
- Portsmouth Regional Hospital, Portsmouth

=== New Jersey ===
- Hoboken University Medical Center, Hoboken
- CentraState Medical Center, Freehold Twp
- Cooper University Hospital, Camden
- Hackensack University Medical Center, Hackensack
- Morristown Medical Center, Morristown, New Jersey
- Jersey Shore University Medical Center, Neptune
- Kennedy University Hospitals, (Cherry Hill, Stratford, Washington Twp.)
- Robert Wood Johnson University Hospital, New Brunswick
- Saint Peter's University Hospital, New Brunswick
- The University Hospital, Newark
- Newark Beth Israel Medical Center, Newark, New Jersey
- Trinitas Regional Medical Center, Elizabeth, New Jersey
- University Medical Center at Princeton, Princeton
- Our Lady of Lourdes Medical Center, Camden
- Jersey City Medical Center, Jersey City, New Jersey
- Palisades Medical Center, North Bergen, New Jersey
- St. Barnabas Medical Center, Livingston, New Jersey

=== New Mexico ===
- University of New Mexico Hospital, Albuquerque
  - UNM Carrie Tingley Hospital
  - UNM Children's Hospital
  - UNM Children's Psychiatric Center
  - UNM Hospital
  - UNM Psychiatric Center
- UNM Cancer Center, Las Cruces, New Mexico
- University of New Mexico Hospital- Sandoval County, Rio Rancho
- Memorial Medical Center, Las Cruces, New Mexico
- Taos Orthopaedic Institute and Research Foundation, Taos, New Mexico
- Mountain View Regional Medical Center, Las Cruces, New Mexico

=== New York ===
- Albany Medical Center Hospital, Albany
- Mary Imogene Bassett Hospital (Basset Medical Center), Cooperstown
- Glen Cove Hospital, Glen Cove, New York
- Long Island Jewish Medical Center (Glen Oaks, Queens; Lake Success, New York; Forest Hills, Queens)
- Nassau University Medical Center, Nassau County (Stony Brook University)
- NewYork-Presbyterian Westchester, Bronxville, New York
- NY-Presbyterian/Westchester Division, White Plains
- North Shore University Hospital, Manhasset (Hofstra Northwell School of Medicine, New York University School of Medicine, Albert Einstein College of Medicine)
- Plainview Hospital, Plainview (New York College of Osteopathic Medicine)
- Stony Brook University Medical Center, at Stony Brook University
- University of Rochester Medical Center, Rochester
- Upstate University Hospital, Syracuse
- Westchester Medical Center University Hospital, at Valhalla, New York
- St. Joseph's Medical Center (Yonkers, New York)
- Winthrop-University Hospital, Mineola, New York
- Burke Rehabilitation Hospital, White Plains, New York
- Syosset Hospital, Syosset, New York
- North Shore University Hospital – Southside Hospital, Bay Shore, New York
- Long Beach Medical Center
- Arnot Ogden Medical Center, Elmira, New York
- Orange Regional Medical Center, Middletown, New York
- Northport VA Medical Center, Northport, New York (Stony Brook University)
- Good Samaritan Hospital Medical Center (West Islip, New York)
- VA Western New York Healthcare System, Buffalo and Batavia (SUNY at Buffalo)
- Franklin Hospital, Valley Stream, New York

==== Buffalo, New York ====
- Buffalo General Hospital
- Erie County Medical Center, Buffalo
- Millard Fillmore Hospital, Buffalo
- Roswell Park Comprehensive Cancer Center, Buffalo
- John R. Oishei Children's Hospital

=== New York City ===
==== Manhattan ====
- Bellevue Hospital Center, Manhattan
- Gouverneur Health, New York City
- Harlem Hospital Center, Harlem, Manhattan
- Hospital for Special Surgery (Weill Cornell Graduate School of Medical Sciences)
- Lenox Hill Hospital, Manhattan (Hofstra Northwell School of Medicine, New York University School of Medicine, New York Medical College, State University of New York Downstate Medical Center College of Medicine)
- Lower Manhattan Hospital, Manhattan
- Manhattan Eye, Ear and Throat Hospital
- Metropolitan Hospital Center
- Mount Sinai Health System
  - Mount Sinai Hospital, Manhattan
  - Mount Sinai Morningside
  - Mount Sinai West
  - New York Eye and Ear Infirmary of Mount Sinai
- New York-Presbyterian Hospital, Manhattan
- NYU Langone Medical Center, Manhattan

===== The Bronx =====
- Bronx-Lebanon Hospital Center, The Bronx
- James J. Peters VA Medical Center, The Bronx
- Jacobi Medical Center, The Bronx
- Lincoln Hospital, The Bronx
- Montefiore Medical Center, The Bronx
- St Barnabas Hospital, The Bronx

===== Brooklyn =====
- Brookdale University Hospital and Medical Center
- Brooklyn Hospital Center, Brooklyn
- Coney Island Hospital, Brooklyn
- Long Island College Hospital, Brooklyn
- Maimonides Medical Center, Brooklyn
- NewYork-Presbyterian Brooklyn Methodist Hospital
- State University of New York Downstate Medical Center, Brooklyn
- Kings County Hospital Center

===== Queens =====
- Cohen Children's Medical Center
- Elmhurst Hospital Center
- NewYork-Presbyterian Queens
- Queens General Center Hospital
- Zucker Hillside Hospital

==== Staten Island ====
- Staten Island University Hospital, Staten Island (State University of New York Downstate Medical Center College of Medicine, Touro College of Osteopathic Medicine)

=== North Carolina ===
  - Carolinas Medical Center, Charlotte
  - Levine Children's Hospital, Charlotte
- Duke University Health System
  - Duke Cancer Institute
  - Duke Children's Hospital and Health Center, Durham
  - Duke Raleigh Hospital, Raleigh, North Carolina
  - Duke Regional Hospital, Durham
  - Duke University Medical Center, Durham
- Cherry Hospital, Goldsboro, North Carolina (Brody School of Medicine at East Carolina University and Campbell University)
- Vidant Health (formerly University Health Systems of Eastern Carolina), Greenville
  - Vidant Beaufort Hospital, Washington
  - Bertie Memorial Hospital, Windsor
  - Chowan Hospital, Edenton
  - Vidant Medical Center, Greenville
  - Duplin General Hospital, Kenansville
  - Heritage Hospital, Tarboro
  - The Outer Banks Hospital, Nags Head
  - Roanoke-Chowan Hospital, Ahoskie
- UNC Hospitals, Chapel Hill (University of North Carolina at Chapel Hill, University of North Carolina School of Medicine)
  - UNC Medical Center
  - Rex Healthcare, Raleigh, North Carolina
  - Chatham Hospital
  - High Point Regional Health
  - Caldwell Memorial Hospital, Lenoir, North Carolina
  - Johnston Health
  - Pardee Hospital
  - Nash Health Care
  - Wayne Memorial Hospital
  - UNC Lenoir Health Care
  - UNC Faculty Physicians
  - UNC Physicians Network
  - NC Memorial Hospital
  - NC Children's Hospital
  - NC Women's Hospital
  - NC Cancer Hospital (clinical home of the UNC Lineberger Comprehensive Cancer Center)
  - NC Neurosciences Hospital
- Brenner Children's Hospital, Winston-Salem, North Carolina
- Wake Forest Baptist Medical Center, Winston-Salem
- WakeMed Cary Hospital
- WakeMed Raleigh Campus
- Wilson Medical Center (North Carolina), Wilson, North Carolina (Duke University)
- Moses H. Cone Memorial Hospital, Greensboro
- Cape Fear Valley Medical Center, Fayetteville, North Carolina
- Southeastern Health/CUSOM, Lumberton, North Carolina
- New Hanover Regional Medical Center, Wilmington

=== Ohio ===
- Cleveland Clinic Akron General, Akron
- Akron Children's Hospital
- Summa Health, Akron
  - Summa Akron City Hospital
  - St. Thomas Campus
- Ashtabula County Medical Center, Ashtabula, Ohio
- Ohio Health – O'Bleness Hospital, Athens
- University Hospitals Ahuja Medical Center, Beachwood, Ohio
- University Hospitals Bedford Medical Center
- St Elizabeth Boardman Hospital, Boardman
- CORE / Adena Health System, Chillicothe
- Mercy Health – The Jewish Hospital, Cincinnati
- TriHealth – Good Samaritan Hospital, Cincinnati
- Cincinnati Children's Hospital Medical Center
- Shriners Hospitals for Children, Cincinnati
- The Christ Hospital, Cincinnati
- University of Cincinnati Medical Center, University of Cincinnati, Cincinnati
- MetroHealth Medical Center, Case Western Reserve University, Cleveland
- University Hospitals Cleveland Medical Center, Case Western Reserve University, Cleveland
- Rainbow Babies & Children's Hospital, Case Western Reserve University, Cleveland
- Cleveland Clinic, Cleveland Clinic Lerner College of Medicine at Case Western Reserve University, Cleveland
  - Fairview Hospital
  - Lutheran Hospital
- South Pointe Hospital – Cleveland Clinic Health System, Cleveland
- The Ohio State University Medical Center, Ohio State University, Columbus
- Louis Stokes Cleveland VA Medical Center
- Ohio Health – Grant Medical Center, Columbus
- Ohio Health – Doctors Hospital, Columbus
- Ohio Health – Riverside Methodist Hospital, Columbus, Ohio
- Mount Carmel East, Columbus
- Mount Carmel West, Columbus
- Dayton Children's Hospital (Boonshoft School of Medicine)
- Dayton VA Medical Center (Boonshoft School of Medicine)
- Good Samaritan Hospital (Dayton) (Boonshoft School of Medicine)
- Grandview Medical Center, Dayton
- Miami Valley Hospital, Dayton
- OhioHealth Dublin Methodist Hospital, Dublin, Ohio (only Family Medicine Residency)
- Kettering Medical Center, Kettering
- Memorial Health System, Marietta
- Hillcrest Hospital, Mayfield Heights, Ohio
- Bethesda North Hospital, Montgomery
- OUCOM / Southern Ohio Medical Center; Portsmouth
- University Hospitals Portage Medical Center, Ravenna, Ohio
- University Hospitals Richmond Medical Center, Richmond Heights
- University of Toledo Medical Center, University of Toledo, Toledo
- Mercy Health – St. Vincent Medical Center, Toledo
- University Hospitals St. John Medical Center, Westlake (University Hospitals of Cleveland)
- Mercy Health – St. Elizabeth Boardman Hospital, Youngstown, Ohio
- Mercy Health – St. Joseph Warren Hospital, Youngstown, Ohio

=== Oklahoma ===
- Oklahoma State University Medical Center, Tulsa
- OU Medicine
  - OU Medical Center
  - OU Medical Center Edmond
  - The Children's Hospital
  - OU Physicians
  - OU Children's Physicians
  - Stephenson Cancer Center
- AllianceHealth Durant, Durant
- Comanche County Memorial Hospital, Lawton, Oklahoma
- Norman Regional Health System, Norman, Oklahoma
- OSUCOM Southwest Medical Center, Oklahoma City

=== Oregon ===
- Oregon Health & Science University Hospital, Portland
- Doernbecher Children's Hospital, Portland
- Shriners Hospital for Children (Portland)
- Veterans Affairs Medical Center (Oregon), Portland
- Legacy Good Samaritan Medical Center, Portland
- Tuality Community Hospital, Hillsboro
- Salem Hospital (Oregon)
- Good Samaritan Regional Medical Center, Corvallis
- Sky Lakes Medical Center, Klamath Falls
- Legacy Emanuel Medical Center
- Legacy Good Samaritan Medical Center

=== Pennsylvania ===
- Einstein Health Network
  - Einstein Medical Center Philadelphia
  - Einstein Medical Center Elkins Park
  - Einstein Medical Center Montgomery
- Jefferson Health :
  - Thomas Jefferson University Hospital, Philadelphia
  - Jefferson Hospital for Neuroscience
- Lehigh Valley Health Network, Allentown
  - Lehigh Valley Hospital-17th Street, Allentown
  - Lehigh Valley Hospital–Cedar Crest, Salisbury Township
  - Jefferson Methodist Hospital
  - Jefferson Abington Hospital, Abington
  - Jefferson Health Northeast (Philadelphia College of Osteopathic Medicine)
- Mercy Catholic Medical Center (MCMC)
  - Mercy Fitzgerald Hospital, Darby, Pennsylvania
  - Mercy Philadelphia Hospital
  - Nazareth Hospital, Philadelphia
- Bryn Mawr Hospital
- Geisinger Medical Center, Danville
- Millcreek Community Hospital LECOM Health, Erie
- St. Vincent Health Center, Erie
- Penn State Milton S. Hershey Medical Center, Hershey
- Conemaugh Memorial Medical Center, Johnstown
- Fox Chase Cancer Center, Philadelphia
- Friends Hospital, Philadelphia
- Hahnemann University Hospital, Philadelphia
- Magee Rehabilitation Hospital
- St. Christopher's Hospital for Children, Philadelphia
- Temple University Hospital, Philadelphia
- University of Pennsylvania Health System, Philadelphia
  - Lancaster General Hospital, Lancaster
  - Penn Presbyterian Medical Center
  - Pennsylvania Hospital
- University of Pittsburgh Medical Center, Pittsburgh
  - UPMC Hamot, Erie
  - UPMC Presbyterian
  - UPMC Magee-Womens
  - UPMC Children's Hospital of Pittsburgh
  - UPMC Mercy
- West Penn Allegheny Health System, Pittsburgh
- Crozer-Chester Medical Center, Upland
- St. Christopher's Hospital for Children
- Mercy Hospital, Scranton
- Reading Hospital and Medical Center, Reading
- St. Luke's University Hospital, Bethlehem
- Wilkes-Barre General Hospital, Wilkes-Barre
- Williamsport Regional Medical Center, Williamsport
- Coatesville VA Medical Center, Coatesville
- Crozer-Chester Medical Center, Chester
- Eagleville Hospital, Eagleville
- Easton Hospital, Easton
- Holy Redeemer Hospital, Meadowbrook
- Mercy Hospital of Philadelphia, Philadelphia
- Pinnacle Hospital, Harrisburg
- Reading Hospital, Reading
- St. Christopher's Hospital for Children, Philadelphia
- Allegheny General Hospital, Pittsburgh
- WellSpan York Hospital, York
- Memorial Hospital, York
- Guthrie Robert Packer Hospital, Sayre, Pennsylvania
- Lankenau Medical Center, Wynnewood, Pennsylvania

=== Rhode Island ===
- Rhode Island Hospital, Warren Alpert Medical School of Brown University
  - Hasbro Children's Hospital
- Roger Williams Medical Center, Providence
- Bradley Hospital, East Providence
- Butler Hospital, Providence
- Kent Hospital, Warwick
- Memorial Hospital of Rhode Island, Pawtucket
- Miriam Hospital, Providence
- Westerly Hospital (Yale-New Haven Health System)
- Women & Infants Hospital of Rhode Island, Providence

=== South Carolina ===
- Greenville Memorial Hospital, Greenville
- Greenville Hospital System University Medical Center
- MUSC Health University Medical Center, Charleston
- Palmetto Health Richland, Columbia
- Palmetto Health Baptist Columbia
- Palmetto Health Children's Hospital
- Palmetto Health South Carolina Cancer Center
- William Jennings Bryan Dorn VA Medical Center
- Lexington Medical Center, Lexington
- Spartanburg Regional Healthcare System
- Grand Strand Medical Center, Myrtle Beach, South Carolina
- McLeod Regional Medical Center, Florence

=== South Dakota ===
- Sanford USD Medical Center, Sioux Falls
- Sanford Vermillion Medical Center, Vermillion
- Avera Sacred Heart Hospital, Yankton
- Rapid City Regional Hospital, Rapid City, South Dakota

=== Tennessee ===
==== Chattanooga ====
- Erlanger Health System (University of Tennessee College of Medicine)

==== Johnson City ====
- Johnson City Medical Center

==== Knoxville ====
- University of Tennessee Medical Center
- East Tennessee Children's Hospital

==== Memphis ====
- Hamilton Eye Institute
- Le Bonheur Children's Medical Center
- St. Jude Children's Research Hospital
- Methodist University Hospital
- Regional One Health

==== Nashville ====
- Vanderbilt University Medical Center
  - Monroe Carell Jr. Children's Hospital at Vanderbilt
  - Vanderbilt-Ingram Cancer Center
  - The Vanderbilt Clinic also known as TVC
  - Vanderbilt Diabetes Center
  - Vanderbilt Orthopaedics Institute
  - Vanderbilt Page Campbell Heart Institute
  - Vanderbilt Rehabilitation Hospital
  - Vanderbilt Sports Medicine Center
  - Vanderbilt Stallworth Rehabilitation Hospital
  - Vanderbilt Transplant Center
  - Vanderbilt University Bill Wilkerson Center
- Ascension Saint Thomas (University of Tennessee Health Science Center)

=== Texas ===
- UT Health East Texas-Athens
- UT Health East Texas Carthage
- UT Health East Texas-Jacksonville
- UT Health East Texas – Pittsburg
- UT Health East Texas – Tyler
- UT Health East Texas – North Campus Tyler
- Carl R. Darnall Army Medical Center, Fort Cavazos
- John Peter Smith Hospital, Fort Worth, Texas

==== Austin ====
- Dell Seton Medical Center at The University of Texas

==== Dallas ====
- University of Texas Southwestern – University Hospitals, Dallas
- Children's Medical Center – University of Texas Southwestern Medical School, Dallas
- Parkland Memorial Hospital, Dallas
- Presbyterian Hospital of Dallas
- Methodist Health System
  - Methodist Dallas Medical Center

==== Denton ====
- UBH Denton

==== El Paso ====
- University Medical Center of El Paso
- William Beaumont Army Medical Center, El Paso, Texas

==== Galveston ====
- University of Texas Medical Branch (UTMB) at Galveston University Hospital, Galveston
- UTMB Children's Hospital
- Shriners Hospital for Children (Galveston)
- Rebecca Sealy Hospital, Galveston (University of Texas Medical Branch)
- John Sealy Hospital, Galveston (University of Texas Medical Branch)

==== Houston ====
- University of Texas MD Anderson Cancer Center – Houston, Texas
- University of Texas Health Science Center at Houston
- Texas Medical Center – Baylor College of Medicine, McGovern Medical School, Houston, Texas
  - Memorial Hermann–Texas Medical Center
  - TIRR Memorial Hermann
  - Michael E. DeBakey Veterans Affairs Medical Center in Houston
- Texas Children's Hospital – Baylor College of Medicine, Houston, Texas
- Baylor St. Luke's Medical Center – Baylor College of Medicine, Houston, Texas
- Michael E. DeBakey Veterans Affairs Medical Center in Houston – Baylor College of Medicine, Houston, Texas
- Memorial Hermann Healthcare System – Baylor College of Medicine, Houston, Texas
- The Menninger Clinic – Baylor College of Medicine, Houston, Texas
- Woman's Hospital of Texas
- CHI St. Luke's Health
- Houston Methodist
- Harris Health System
  - Ben Taub Hospital – Baylor College of Medicine, Houston, Texas
  - Lyndon Baines Johnson General Hospital
  - Quentin Mease Community Hospital

==== Lubbock ====
- University Medical Center, Lubbock

==== Plano ====
- Children's Medical Center at Legacy, Plano, Texas

==== San Antonio ====
- University Health System, San Antonio
- University Hospital Robert B. Green Campus
- Children's Hospital of San Antonio – Baylor College of Medicine, San Antonio, Texas
- Brooke Army Medical Center (University of Texas Health Science Center at San Antonio and USUHS)

==== Temple ====
- Baylor Scott & White Medical Center – Temple

=== Utah ===
- University of Utah Hospital, Salt Lake City
- Huntsman Cancer Institute, Salt Lake City
- Primary Children's Hospital
- University Neuropsychiatric Institute
- Intermountain Medical Center
- McKay-Dee Hospital, Ogden, Utah
- Utah Valley Hospital, Provo, Utah
- Ogden Regional Medical Center

=== Vermont ===
- University of Vermont Medical Center, Burlington, Vermont
- Veterans Affairs Medical Center, White River Junction
- Fletcher Allen Health Care, Burlington
- Central Vermont Medical Center

=== Virginia ===
==== Abingdon ====
- Johnston Memorial Hospital

==== Charlottesville, Virginia ====
- University of Virginia Health System

==== Christiansburg, Virginia ====
- Omnee Carilion New River Valley Medical Center

==== Falls Church ====
- Inova Fairfax Hospital
- Inova Neuroscience & Spine Institute

==== Front Royal ====
- Valley Health System

==== Hampton ====
- Veterans Affairs Medical Center – Eastern Virginia Medical School

==== Lynchburg ====
- Centra Health

==== Newport News ====
- Riverside Regional Medical Center

==== Norfolk ====
- Children's Hospital of The King's Daughters – Eastern Virginia Medical School
- Sentara Norfolk General Hospital – Eastern Virginia Medical School
- Sentara Heart Hospital – Eastern Virginia Medical School
- Bon Secours Depaul Hospital – Eastern Virginia Medical School

==== Norton ====
- Norton Community Hospital

==== Portsmouth ====
- Bon Secours Maryview Hospital – Eastern Virginia Medical School
- Portsmouth Naval Hospital – Eastern Virginia Medical School

==== Richmond ====
- Virginia Commonwealth University Medical Center
- Chippenham & Johnston-Willis Hospitals

==== Roanoke, Virginia ====
- Carilion Clinic – Virginia Tech Carilion School of Medicine

==== Salem ====
- LewisGale Medical Center
- Salem VA Medical Center (University of Virginia School of Medicine, Edward Via College of Osteopathic Medicine and Virginia Tech Carilion School of Medicine)

==== Virginia Beach ====
- Sentara Leigh Hospital – Eastern Virginia Medical School
- Sentara Princess Anne Hospital – Eastern Virginia Medical School
- Sentara Virginia Beach General Hospital – Eastern Virginia Medical School

==== Williamsburg ====
- Eastern State Mental Hospital – Eastern Virginia Medical School

=== Washington ===
- University of Washington Medical Center, Seattle
- Harborview Medical Center, Seattle
- Seattle Children's Hospital
- Northwest Hospital & Medical Center, Seattle
- Virginia Mason Hospital, Seattle
- Valley Medical Center, Renton
- Skagit Valley Hospital
- Providence St. Peter Hospital, Olympia
- Mary Bridge Children's Hospital, Tacoma
- Madigan Army Medical Center, Tacoma
- St. Joseph Medical Center (Tacoma, Washington)
- Swedish Medical Center/First Hill, Seattle
- VA Pudget Sound Health Care System
- Valley Medical Center, Renton, Washington
- Providence Sacred Heart Medical Center, Spokane, Washington
- Kaiser Permanente Washington, Seattle
- PeaceHealth Southwest Medical Center, Vancouver
- Kadlec Regional Medical Center, Richland
- Skagit Regional Health, Mt. Vernon
- Trios Health, Kennewick
- MultiCare Health System, Tacoma
- Harrison Medical Center, Bremerton

=== Washington, D.C. ===
- The George Washington University Hospital
- Howard University Hospital
- MedStar Georgetown University Hospital
- MedStar Washington Hospital Center
- St. Elizabeths Hospital
- Sibley Memorial Hospital
- Children's National Medical Center
- Providence Hospital (Washington, D.C.)

=== West Virginia ===
- West Virginia University Hospitals, Martinsburg
- West Virginia University Hospitals, Ranson
- West Virginia University Hospitals, Morgantown
- J.W. Ruby Memorial, Morgantown
- WVU Children's Hospital – Morgantown, West Virginia
- Charleston Area Medical Center, Charleston
- Veterans Affairs Medical Center, Huntington
- Cabell Huntington Hospital, Huntington
- St. Mary's Medical Center, Huntington (Marshall University Joan C. Edwards School of Medicine)
- Marshall University Rural Health Clinic, Chapmanville
- Ohio Valley Medical Center, Wheeling (West Virginia School of Osteopathic Medicine)
- United Hospital Center, Bridgeport

=== Wisconsin ===
- Froedtert Hospital (Medical College of Wisconsin, Milwaukee)
- Children's Hospital of Wisconsin (Medical College of Wisconsin, Milwaukee)
- University of Wisconsin Hospital and Clinics
- Gundersen Lutheran Medical Center (University of Wisconsin School of Medicine and Public Health)
- Meriter Hospital, Madison
- St. Mary's Hospital Medical Center, Green Bay (Medical College of Wisconsin, Milwaukee)
- Mayo Clinic Health System – Arcadia (Franciscan Healthcare)
- Mayo Clinic Health System – Northland
- Mayo Clinic Health System – Chippewa Valley
- Mayo Clinic Health System – Eau Claire
- Mayo Clinic Health System – La Crosse (Franciscan Healthcare)
- Marshfield Clinic, Marshfield
- Mayo Clinic Health System – Red Cedar
- ThedaCare Regional Medical Center–Neenah
- Mercy Health System, Janesville, Wisconsin
- Aurora Health Care, Milwaukee

== Vietnam ==
=== Ho Chi Minh City ===
- 115 people's hospital
- 1st Children's hospital
- 2nd Children's hospital
- Bình Dân hospital for surgeon
- Chợ Rẫy hospital
- Gia Định people's hospital
- Hospital of Bình Tân district
- Hospital of Thủ Đức district
- Hồ Chí Minh city hospital of Blood transfusion and Heamatology
- Hồ Chí Minh city hospital of Cancer
- Hồ Chí Minh city hospital of Dermatology and Venereal diseases
- Hồ Chí Minh city hospital of Ear – nose – throat
- Hồ Chí Minh city hospital of Odontostomatology
- Hồ Chí Minh city hospital of Ophthalmology
- Hồ Chí Minh city hospital of Trauma and Orthopedics
- Hồ Chí Minh city hospital of Tropical diseases
- Hùng Vương hospital of Obstetrics and Gynecology
- Nguyễn Trãi hospital
- Nguyễn Tri Phương hospital
- University medical center – Ho Chi Minh City university of Medicines and Pharmacy
- Phạm Ngọc Thạch hospital of Tuberculogy and Lung Diseases
- Trưng Vương hospital
- Từ Dũ hospital of Obstetrics and Gynecology
- Institute of Traditional medicines

== See also ==
- Medical school
- Teaching hospital
