= List of medical schools in South Korea =

This is a list of medical schools located in South Korea.

== Western Medicine ==
=== Private medical colleges ===
- Ajou University, School of Medicine
- Catholic Kwandong University, College of Medicine
- Catholic University of Daegu, School of Medicine
- Catholic University of Korea, College of Medicine
- CHA University, Graduate school of Medicine
- Chosun University, College of Medicine
- Chung-Ang University, College of Medicine
- Dankook University, College of Medicine
- Dong-A University, College of Medicine
- Dongguk University, College of Medicine
- Eulji University, College of Medicine
- Ewha Womans University, College of Medicine
- Gachon University, College of Medicine
- Hallym University, School of Medicine
- Hanyang University, School of Medicine
- Inha University, School of Medicine
- Inje University, College of Medicine
- Keimyung University, School of Medicine
- Konkuk University, School of Medicine
- Konyang University, College of Medicine
- Korea University School of Medicine
- Kosin University, College of Medicine
- Kyung Hee University, School of Medicine
- Soonchunhyang University, College of Medicine
- Sungkyunkwan University, School of Medicine
- University of Ulsan College of Medicine
- Wonkwang University, College of Medicine
- Yeungnam University, College of Medicine
- Yonsei University, College of Medicine

=== National University College of Medicine ===
- Jeju National University, College of Medicine
- Jeonbuk National University, Medical School
- Chonnam National University, Medical School
- Chungbuk National University, College of Medicine
- Chungnam National University, College of Medicine
- Gyeongsang National University, School of Medicine
- Kangwon National University, School of Medicine
- Kyungpook National University School of Medicine
- Pusan National University, School of Medicine
- Seoul National University, College of Medicine

== Korean Medicine ==
- Gachon University, College of Korean Medicine
- Kyung Hee University, College of Korean Medicine
- Daegu Haany University, College of Korean Medicine
- DaeJeon University, College of Korean Medicine
- Dongguk University, College of Korean Medicine
- Dongshin University, College of Korean Medicine
- Dong-eui University, College of Korean Medicine
- Pusan National University, School of Korean Medicine
- Sangji University, College of Korean Medicine
- Semyung University, College of Korean Medicine
- Woosuk University, College of Korean Medicine
- Wonkwang University, College of Korean Medicine

== See also ==
- List of medical schools in Asia
