= Lee Jin-sook =

Lee Jin-sook may refer to:

- Lee Chae-yeon (born 1978 as Lee Jin-sook), South Korean singer
- Lee Jin-sook (academic) (born 1960), South Korean engineer and academic administrator
- Lee Jin-sook (journalist) (born 1961), South Korean journalist and politician, chairwoman of the Korea Communications Commission
