= Journal of Ginseng Research =

- Discipline: Ginseng research
- Language: English
- Edited by: Jong-Hoon Kim

Publication details
- Former name: Koryŏ Insam Hakhoe
- History: 1976-present
- Publisher: Elsevier on behalf of The Korean Society of Ginseng
- Frequency: Bimonthly
- Open access: Yes
- License: CC BY-NC-ND
- Impact factor: 5.735 (2021)

Standard abbreviations
- ISO 4: J. Ginseng Res.

Indexing
- CODEN: JGREF7
- ISSN: 1226-8453 (print); 2093-4947 (web)
- LCCN: 2005243553
- OCLC no.: 820734796
- Koryŏ Insam Hakhoe
- CODEN: KINHEK
- ISSN: 1016-2615
- LCCN: 79641558
- OCLC no.: 1026524284

Links
- Journal homepage; Online archive

The Journal of Ginseng Research is a bimonthly peer-reviewed open-access scientific journal covering all aspects of research on ginseng, from basic science to pre-clinical and clinical research. It was established in 1976 as Koryŏ Insam Hakhoe (English: Korean Journal of Ginseng Science), obtaining its current name in 1998. The journal is published by Elsevier on behalf of The Korean Society of Ginseng and the editor-in-chief is Jong-Hoon Kim (Jeonbuk National University). The journal publishes review articles, research articles, and brief reports.

== Abstracting and indexing ==
The journal is abstracted and indexed in:

- Biological Abstracts
- BIOSIS Previews
- CAB Abstracts
- Food Science and Technology Abstracts
- Science Citation Index Expanded
- Scopus

According to the Journal Citation Reports, the journal has a 2021 impact factor of 5.735.
