= Lee Jin-sook (academic) =

South Korean engineer (born 1960)

- 이진숙
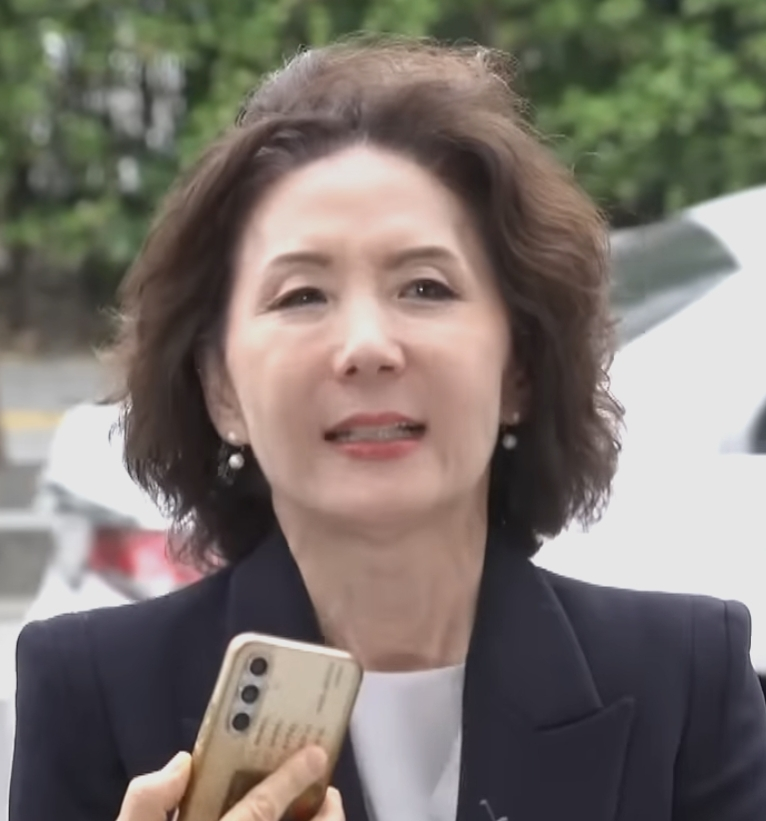

President of Chungnam National University
- In office 28 February 2020 – 27 February 2024
- Preceded by: Oh Duk-sung
- Succeeded by: Kim Jeong-kyoum

Personal details
- Born: 17 June 1960 (age 66) Daejeon, South Chungcheong Province, South Korea
- Education: Chungnam National University (BS, MS); Tokyo Institute of Technology (PhD)

Korean name
- Hangul: 이진숙
- Hanja: 李眞淑
- RR: I Jinsuk
- MR: I Chinsuk

Lee Jin-sook (Korean: 이진숙; born 17 June 1960) is a South Korean professor of architectural engineering at Chungnam National University (CNU), who served as its 19th president. She was the first woman to become president of CNU or any of the other Flagship Korean National Universities.

== Biography ==
Lee has been teaching at CNU from 1989. Since then, she has taken various roles in her university such as dean of its Department of Architectural Engineering and College of Engineering and Graduate School of Industry, its Director of Office of International Affairs and the president of council of CNU women professors. She is the second CNU head whose alma mater includes CNU.

Lee has also taken multiple advisory roles to the government participating in Presidential Advisory Council on Science and Technology and Presidential Committee on Architecture Policy as well as sub-committees of Ministry of Land, Infrastructure and Transport, Ministry of Environment, Ministry of the Interior and Safety, now-Ministry of Agriculture, Food and Rural Affairs, now Ministry of Science and ICT and National Agency for Administrative City Construction. She also took advisory roles to local governments of Daejeon Metropolitan City where CNU resides and nearby South Chungcheong Province.

She was also the president of Korea Society of Lighting and Visual Environment and Korea Society of Color Studies.

Lee is the first CNU president directly elected by all members of CNU - its academic staff, administrative staff and students. In the first round of CNU-president-election, she ranked second scoring 22.55% of the total votes by earning the most votes from administrative staff, TAs and students. In the second round, she earned 52.34% of the votes. Her nomination was approved by Ministry of Education and confirmed by President Moon Jae-in.

She holds the bachelor's in architectural engineering education and master's in architectural planning from CNU and a doctorate degree in architectural environment planning from Tokyo Institute of Technology.

Lee's term as president ended on 27 February 2024. She was succeeded by Kim Jeong-kyoum.

In June 2025, President Lee Jae Myung nominated Lee for the position of Minister of Education, set to be the first woman to hold it. Lee's scrutiny hearing for this nomination was held at the South Korean National Assembly on 14 July 2025.

On 20 July 2025, Lee Jae-myung withdrew the nomination of Lee Jin-sook as Minister of Education.
