= Jeju National University Teachers College =

Part of Cheju National University

Coordinates: 33°30′53″N 126°33′09″E

- Hangul: 제주대학교 교육대학
- Hanja: 濟州大學校 敎育大學
- RR: Jeju daehakgyo gyoyuk daehak
- MR: Cheju taehakkyo kyoyuk taehak

Jeju National University of Education was the only teacher-training university on South Korea's Jeju Island. It was located in the provincial capital, Jeju City. It merged with Cheju National University and its campus is used as Sara Campus of Cheju National University in 2008. Since then, it is being operated as the Teachers College of Cheju National University now.

== Academics ==
Undergraduate studies are divided among the departments of Educational Research, Moral Education, Korean Education, Mathematics Education, English Education, Social Education, Physical Education, Music Education, Art Education, Practical Course Education, Science Education, and Computer Education.

== History ==
The school began its existence shortly after liberation from Japanese rule in 1946, as a normal school called Jeju Elementary Teacher Instruction School (제주도 임시초등교원강습소). The first training program, begun in July 1946, was only 3 months in length, but following the end of the first session, on November 10 it was made a one-year program. The training program was expanded to three years in 1951. In 1953, the school was reorganized as Jeju Provincial Normal School (제주도립사범학교). From 1962 to 1968, it operated as the education department of Cheju National University. In 1984, following a reform in the national education law, the program was extended to four years in length. The college became a university in 1993. The graduate school was opened in 2000. It merged with Cheju National University again in 2008 as 1960s.

== See also ==
- List of colleges and universities in South Korea
- Education in South Korea
