= Cho Mina =

South Korean poet (born 1960)

Mina Cho 조미나
- Born: July 1960 (age 66); Seoul, South Korea
- Occupations: Poet, Literary critic, Lecturer, Teacher
- Writing career
- Literary movement: Mysticism, Romanticism, Christian Gnosticism,
- Website: minac2009.blogspot.ca

Mina Cho (Korean: 조미나; born July 1960) is a South Korean poet, critic, lecturer, and teacher.

== Early life and education ==
Mina Cho was born in Seoul in July 1960.

She earned Ph.D. in English Literature from Chungnam National University in February 1995. Her doctoral dissertation is A Study of Christian Gnosticism in W. B. Yeats's Poetry: Based on the Goddess Imagery.

== Career ==
She was a lecturer in various Universities in South Korea such as Chung-nam National University, Tae-jon University, Paejae University and Hong-ik University. She has researched William Butler Yeats's poetry and joined conferences. Mina has been a Korean poet since 1985 by Korean poetry journal company, Simunhaksa in Seoul, S. Korea. She has published four books of poetry into Korean: The Rite of Wind (1988), Searching for the Tree of Life (1995), The Silence of Love (2001), A Love like A Flowing River (2010). She continues to write and publish.

She published her first book of literary criticism, The Explanation of W. B. Yeats's Poetry (2009). She also translated her first book of literary criticism based on W.B. Yeats's Poetry into Korean. (2012) by Idambooks publication. She also works as a critic and translator in South Korea. She has some books which were translated English into Korean such as The Confessions of Jacob Boehme (2009) and The Selected Plays of W. B. Yeats.(2009), Youth and the Secret Sharer (2010), and Nostromo (2012) by Joseph Conrad.

A member of the Korean Literary Association, the Hundae Literary Association, Hosoe Literary Writers' Association, the Yeats Society of Korea, the Korean Society of Literature and Religion, the English Language and Literature Association of Korea, and the International P.E.N. Korea Centre.

== Selected works ==
=== Books ===
- Cho, Mina (1988). The Rite of Wind.
- Cho, Mina (1995). Searching for the Tree of Life.
- Cho, Mina (2001). The Silence of Love.
- Cho, Mina (2010). A Love Like A Flowing River. 오름에디션. ISBN 9788990151438.
- The Explanation of W. B. Yeats's Poetry (2009)
- Cho, Mina (2012). W. B. 예이츠 시 해설 [The Explanation of W. B. Yeats's Poetry] (in Korean). 이담북스. ISBN 978-89-268-3619-4.

=== Translations ===
- Boehme, Jacob (2009). 야코프 뵈메의 고백 [The Confessions of Jacob Boehme] (in Korean). Translated by Mina Cho. 누멘. ISBN 978-89-93800-14-2.
- Yeats, W.B. (2009). Daum 예이츠 희곡 선집 [The Selected Plays of W. B. Yeats] (in Korean). Translated by Mina Cho.
- Conrad, Joseph (2010). Daum 청춘 은밀한 동거인 [Youth and the Secret Sharer] (in Korean). Translated by Mina Cho. 누멘. ISBN 9788993800487.
- Literary criticism based on W.B. Yeats (2012)
- Conrad, Joseph (2012). Daum 노스트로모 [Nostromo] (in Korean). Translated by Mina Cho.
