= Eulji University =

Medical school in Daejeon, South Korea

Coordinates: 36.33289°N 127.40557°E

- Motto: 연구, 봉사 (Research and Service)
- Type: Private, secular
- Established: 1967
- President: Dr. Park Jun-yeong
- Location: Seongnam Campus; 212 Yangji-dong, Sujeong-gu, Seongnam City, Gyeonggi-do Daejeon Campus 143-5 Yongdu 2-dong, Jung-gu, Daejeon, South Korea
- Campus: Daejeon Campus Urban, 23,000 m^{2}
- Website: www.eulji.ac.kr

- Eulji University
- Hangul: 을지대학교
- Hanja: 乙支大學校
- Revised Romanization: Eulji Daehakgyo
- McCune–Reischauer: Ŭlji Taehakkyo

Eulji University (Korean: 을지대학교) is a private nonprofit healthcare and medical research university in South Korea with campuses in Seongnam, Gyeonggi Province, and in central Daejeon. The school was established in 1967 by Dr. Park Jun-yeong and the Eulji Educational Foundation, which grew out of the Eulji Hospital.

== Organization ==
Eulji University has a College of Nursing, a Department of Medicine that includes undergraduate pre-medical and graduate medical schools, a College of Health Sciences that includes dentistry, emergency medicine, radiological science, biomedical engineering, physical therapy, and cosmetic medicine, a College of Health Industry that includes nutrition, environmental and safety fields, medical information technology, marketing and management, early childhood education, mortuary science and addiction and social services fields, and a Department of Liberal Arts. The Graduate School includes most of the major undergraduate medical fields, as well as clinical psychology, senior healthcare and ophthalmology.

The original Eulji Hospital in Seoul remains in operation, along with a teaching hospital in Daejeon.

== See also ==
- Education in South Korea
- List of medical schools in South Korea
- List of universities and colleges in South Korea
