= Kyungpook National University School of Medicine =

Medical school in Daegu, South Korea

KNU School of Medicine
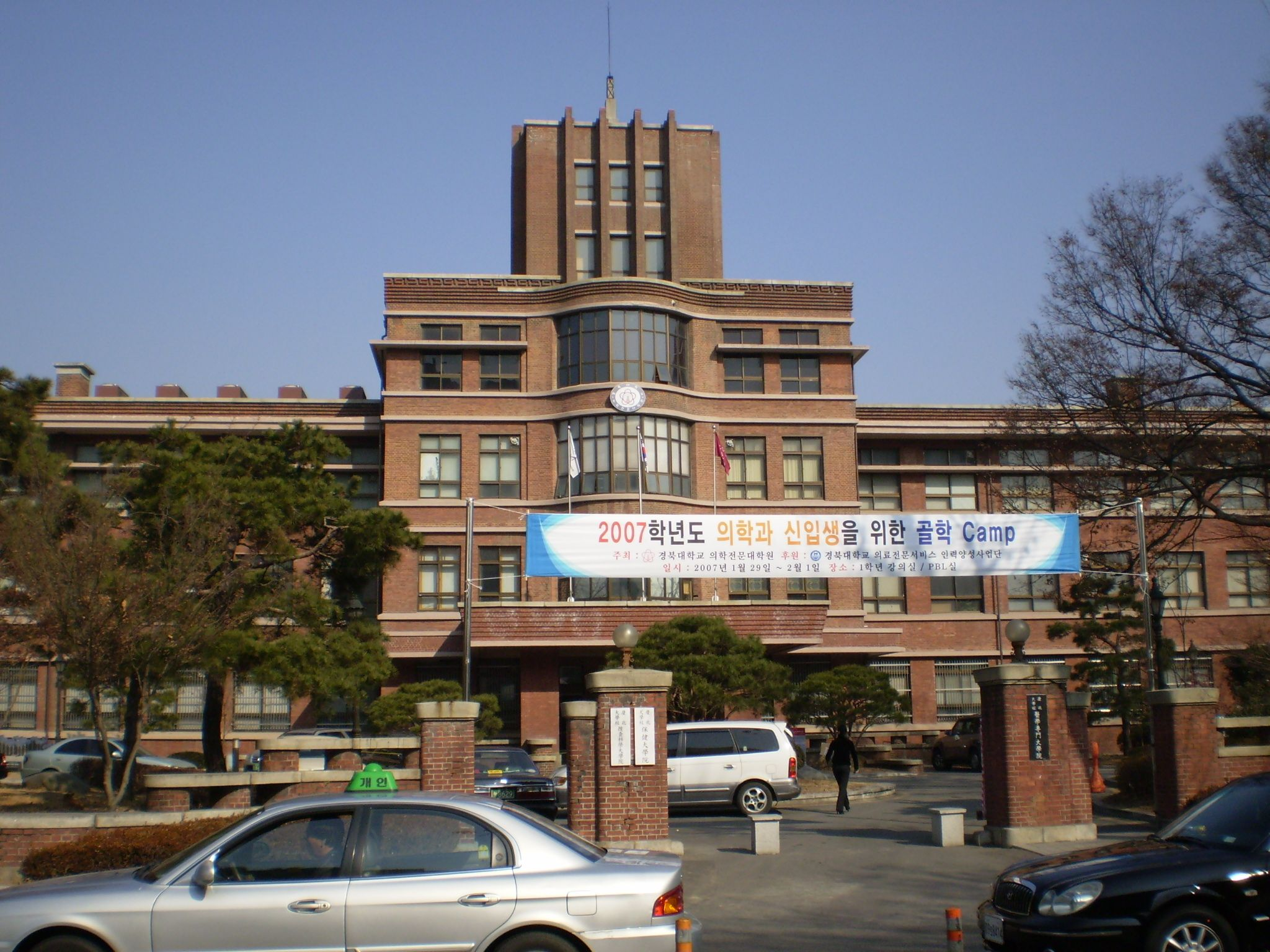
- Former names: Daegu Medical College
- Type: National
- Established: 1923
- Academic staff: 212
- Students: 655; 448 MD; 12 MD-PhD; 111 MS; 96 PhD
- Location: Daegu, South Korea
- Campus: Urban
- Website: med.knu.ac.kr

- Kyungpook National University School of Medicine
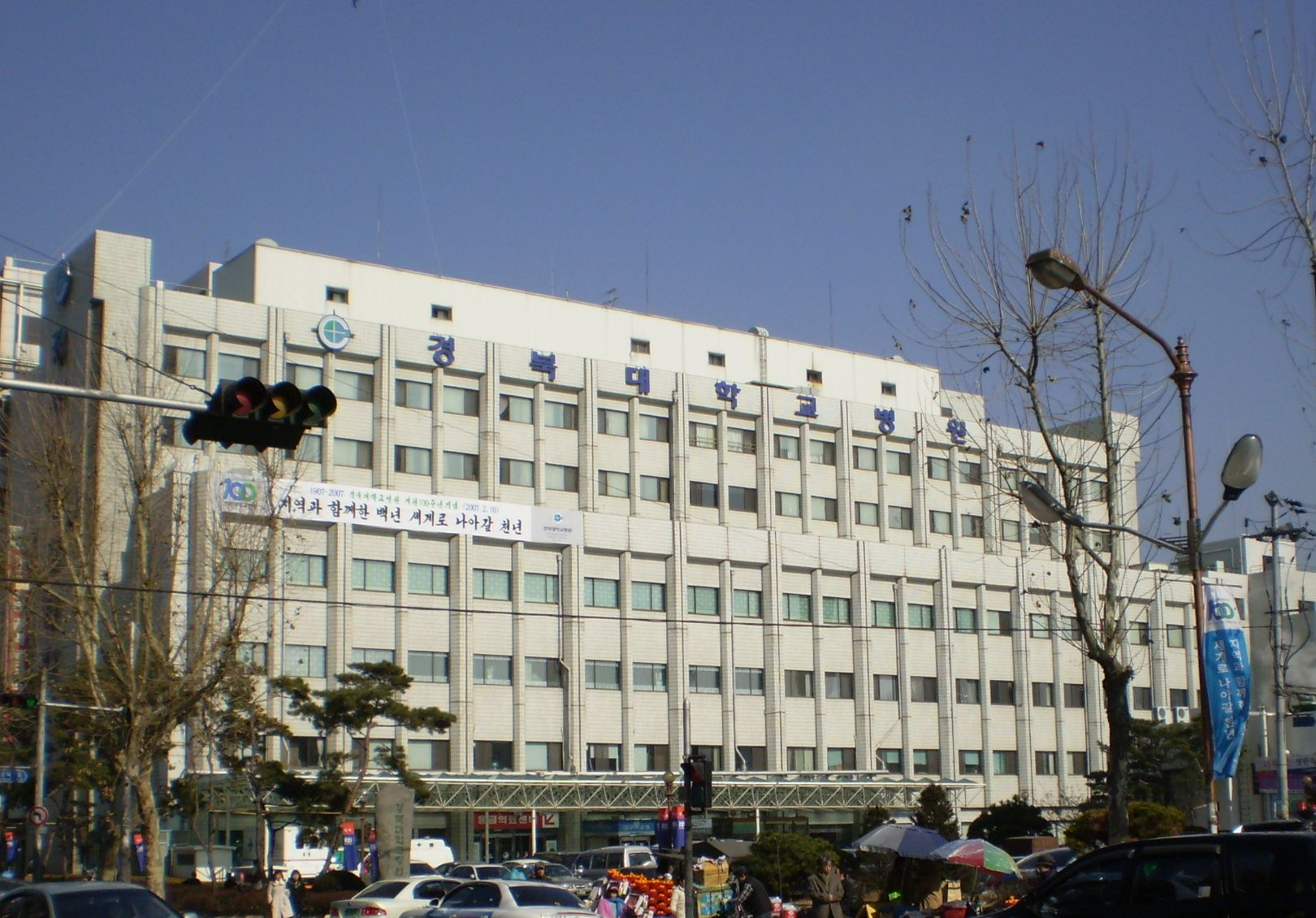
- Kyungpook National University Hospital

Korean name
- Hangul: 경북대학교 의학전문대학원
- Hanja: 慶北大學校 醫學專門大學院
- RR: Gyeongbuk daehakgyo uihak jeonmun daehagwon
- MR: Kyŏngbuk taehakkyo ŭihak chŏnmun taehagwŏn

Kyungpook National University School of Medicine (commonly referred to as KNU Med or KNU School of Medicine) is the medical school of Kyungpook National University in Daegu, South Korea. Founded in 1923, it is the second-oldest medical school in South Korea after Yonsei University College of Medicine. It is considered as one of the most prestigious medical school in South Korea. KNU Med offers the MD, MD-PhD, MSc and PhD degrees in medicine. Each class in the four-year MD program has approximately 110 students.

== History ==
KNU School of Medicine officially traces its origins to Daegu Medical Academy affiliated with Daegu Charity Hospital in 1923, making it the second-oldest medical school in South Korea. The school was renamed the KNU School of Medicine in 1951.

== Academics ==
=== Degree Programs ===
Degree programs offered by KNU School of Medicine:

- Doctor of Medicine (MD)
- MD-PhD
- Master of Science (MS)
- Doctor of Philosophy (PhD)

=== Curriculum ===
KNU School of Medicine curriculum
Year 1
- Introduction to Medicine
- Normal and Abnormal Human Biology 1
  - Anatomy and Histology
  - Embryology
  - Biochemistry and Cell Biology
  - Physiology and Biophysics
- Normal and Abnormal Human Biology 2
  - Neuroscience
  - Immunology and Microbiology
  - Pathology
  - Human Genetics
  - Pharmacology
  - Epidemiology
- Elective Seminar
Year 2
- Pathophysiology of Diseases 1
  - Laboratory Medicine and Medical Imaging
  - Clinical Oncology
  - Infectious Diseases
  - Endocrine and Metabolic Disorders
  - Hematologic Disorders
  - Psychiatry
  - Neuroscience
  - Disorders of the Respiratory System
  - Allergic Disorders
  - Cardioangiology
  - Doctor-patient relationship
- Pathophysiology of Diseases 2
  - Disorders of the Kidney and Urinary System
  - Disorders of the Gastrointestinal and Hepatobiliary System
  - Emergency Medicine
  - Surgery, Anesthesiology and Pain Medicine
  - Maternal-fetal medicine
  - Gynecology
  - Growth, Development and Aging
  - Community Medicine
  - Dermatology, Ophthalmology and Otorhinolaryngology
  - Clinical Medicine
Year 3
- Core Clerkship 1
- Core Clerkship 2
- Biomedical Ethics
- Occupational and Environmental Medicine
- Legal Medicine
- Medical Informatics
- Biomedical Engineering
- Research Methodology in Medical Science

Year 4
- Elective Courses and Review of Medical Science
- Affiliated Hospital Clerkship
- Social Service
- Clinicopathologic Conference
- Healthcare Management
- Medical Legislation
- Hospital Management
- Thanatology
- Medical Education
- Medical Nutrition
- Medical Statistics

== See also ==
- Kyungpook National University
- List of medical schools in South Korea
