= Chungbuk National University =

University in South Korea

Coordinates: 36.629°N 127.457°E

Chungbuk National University (CBNU)
- 충북대학교
- Other name: 충대 (ChungDae)
- Motto: Korean: 개신(開新); Latin: Nova aperio (I uncover new things)
- Type: National
- Established: 1951; 75 years ago
- Academic affiliations: Flagship Korean National Universities
- President: Cheon Beom San (천범산)
- Faculty: 551 (2022)
- Students: 18,334 (2022)
- Undergraduates: 12,818 (2022)
- Postgraduates: 3,354 (2022)
- Location: Cheongju, South Korea
- Campus: Urban
- Colors: Rich maroon
- Mascot: Bull
- Website: www.cbnu.ac.kr/english/index.do
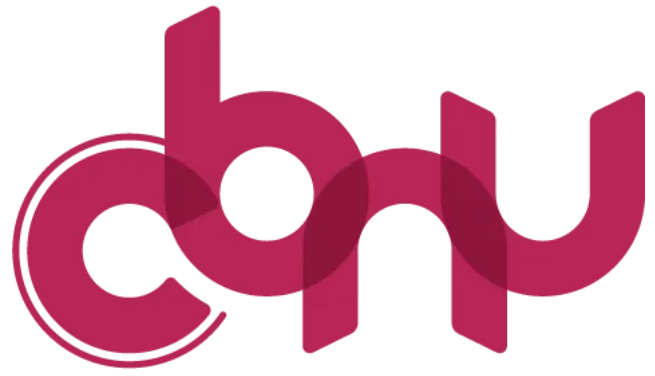

University rankings
QS National	General	32–37
THE National	General	28–38
ARWU National	Research	19–23
QS Asia (Asia version)	General	=305
THE Asia (Asia version)	General	351–400
ARWU World	Research	701–800
QS World	General	1001–1200
THE World	General	1201–1500
USNWR World	General	=1553

- Chungbuk National University
- Hangul: 충북대학교
- Hanja: 忠北大學校
- RR: Chungbuk daehakgyo
- MR: Ch'ungbuk taehakkyo

Chungbuk National University (CBNU) is one of ten Flagship Korean National Universities. It takes its name, Chungbuk, from the common abbreviated form of the province's Korean name Chungcheongbuk-do.

== Colleges and schools ==
Undergraduate colleges of CBNU

- College of Humanities
- College of Social Sciences
- College of Natural Sciences
- College of Commerce and Business Administration
- College of Engineering
- College of Electrical & Computer Engineering
- College of Agriculture, Life & Environment Sciences
- College of Law
- College of Education
- College of Human Ecology
- College of Veterinary Medicine
- College of Pharmacy
- College of Medicine
- Division of Autonomous Majors
- School of Interdisciplinary Science

Graduate schools of CBNU

- Graduate School
- Graduate School of Education
- Graduate School of Public Administration
- Graduate School of Industry
- Graduate School of Business Administration
- Graduate School of Legal Affairs
- Law school
- Graduate School of Medicine (Medical school)
- Graduate School of Health Science Business Convergence

== See also ==
- Flagship Korean National Universities
- List of national universities in South Korea
- List of universities and colleges in South Korea
- Education in Korea
