= Flagship Korean National Universities =

League of South Korean universities

- Hangul: 거점국립대학교
- Hanja: 據點國立大學校
- Lit.: National universities designed as provincial centers
- RR: geojeom gungnip daehakgyo
- MR: kŏchŏm kungnip taehakkyo

The Flagship National Universities (Korea NU 10, Korean: 거점국립대학교) is a collective term referring to ten universities in South Korea that have joined the Presidential Council of the Korean Flagship National Universities.

Often these universities (mainly these all flagship Korean national universities including Seoul National University) are known as 거점국립대, an abbreviation of 거점국립대학교, in various high school student communities.

== Universities ==
The 10 Korean Flagship National Universities are:

- Chonnam National University, founded 1952 in Gwangju for the area of Gwangju and South Jeolla Province
- Chungbuk National University, founded 1951 in Cheongju for the area of North Chungcheong Province
- Chungnam National University, founded 1952 in Daejeon for the area of Daejeon and South Chungcheong Province and since 2007 also Sejong City
- Gyeongsang National University, founded 1948 in Jinju for the area of South Gyeongsang Province and Ulsan
- Jeju National University, founded 1952 in Jeju City for the area of Jeju Province
- Jeonbuk National University, founded 1947 in Jeonju for the area of North Jeolla Province
- Kangwon National University, founded 1947 in Chuncheon for the area of Gangwon Province
- Pusan National University, founded 1946 in Busan for the area of Busan, Ulsan and South Gyeongsang Province
- Kyungpook National University, founded 1946 in Daegu for the area of Daegu and North Gyeongsang Province
- Seoul National University, founded 1946 in Seoul for the area of Seoul, Incheon and Gyeonggi Province

== History ==
The term Korean Flagship National University was used as a local national university because until 1991, only 10 national universities operated in Korea. The Presidential Council of the Korean Flagship National Universities was originally established in 1996 as the Council of Five National Universities. It consisted of:

- Kyungpook National University
- Pusan National University
- Chonnam National University
- Jeonbuk National University
- Chungnam National University

Later, five more universities joined:

- Kangwon National University
- Gyeongsang National University
- Seoul National University
- Jeju National University
- Chungbuk National University

== Characteristics ==
Most of the Korean Flagship National Universities were created by merging regional colleges. After National Liberation, national universities in major urban areas and provinces merged. Compared to other universities, Flagship National Universities tend to have departments that produce professions needed by the local community. Flagship National Universities are often preferred by students because of their large size and low tuition.

=== Medical schools ===
All ten Korean Flagship National Universities operate medical schools. Seoul National University has the largest medical school in South Korea (entrance quota: 135), followed by Pusan National University (125), Chonnam National University (125) and Chungnam National University (110). Among the 10 largest medical schools in South Korea, six medical schools belong to Korean Flagship National Universities.

Pusan National University has the only graduate school of oriental medicine in South Korea, called The School of Korean Medicine.

=== Dental schools ===
Among eleven schools of dental medicine in South Korea, five belong to Korean Flagship National Universities. Seoul National University has the largest school of dental medicine in South Korea, followed by Pusan National University.

=== Veterinary schools ===
All Korean Flagship National Universities except Pusan National University have veterinary schools.

Among them, nine belong to Korean Flagship National Universities. (Konkuk University is the only private university in the country with a veterinary school).

=== Law schools ===
All Korean Flagship National Universities except Gyeongsang National University have law schools. Seoul National University has the largest.

Among the 25 law schools in South Korea, nine law schools belong to Korean Flagship National Universities.

South Korean law school quotas
Flagship university	Entrance quota
Seoul National University	150
Pusan National University	120
Kyungpook National University	120
Chonnam National University	120
Chungnam National University	100
Chonbuk National University	80
Chungbuk National University	70
Kangwon National University	40
Jeju National University	40

== Collaboration ==
Flagship National Universities have an exchange agreement. Exchange students can go to regular and seasonal semesters, and online credit exchange is possible. A sports competition is held every year. It publishes the flagship National University newsletter.

This cooperation was reaffirmed in August 2023 when the ten universities announced that they would establish a joint research facility focusing on quantum mechanics, rechargeable batteries and biotechnology and continue to support their staff and researchers in working together.
