= Gyeongsang National University =

University in Jinju, South Korea

Coordinates: 35°9′14.6″N 128°5′53.1″E

- 경상국립대학교
- Type: National
- Established: 1948; 78 years ago
- President: Kweon Jin-hwe (권진회)
- Location: Jinju, Gyeongsangnam-do, Republic of Korea
- Campus: Gajwa Campus (Main Campus), Chilam Campus, Tongyeong Campus, Changwon Campus, Naedong Campus, Sacheon Campus
- Website: GNU

- Gyeongsang National University
- Hangul: 경상국립대학교
- Hanja: 慶尙國立大學校
- RR: Gyeongsang gungnip daehakgyo
- MR: Kyŏngsang kungnip taehakkyo

Gyeongsang National University (GNU, Korean: 경상국립대학교) is one of ten Flagship Korean National Universities located in Jinju, South Gyeongsang Province.

Gyeongsang National University has twelve colleges such as arts, social science, natural science, engineering, agriculture and life science, management, veterinary, education, nursing, and medicine, and eight graduate schools such as medicine and public health, business administration, education, aerospace, industry, etc. Other institutions with the university are the university library, university museum, student center, university newspaper, broadcasting center, publishing company, institute for education of science talented, Korean language cultural center, and so on. The current statistics of Gyeongsang National University shows that it has 1,681 academic staff including 808 full-time professors, 361 administrative staff, and 24,502 students including undergraduate and graduate students enrolled. The university has three campuses and two of these are located in Jinju, South Gyeongsang Province and the other is located in Tongyeong. The main campus is located at Gajwa-Dong in the city of Jinju, the Chilam campus, also in Jinju, has the College of Medicine, and the Tongyeong campus, an hour from Jinju by car, has the College of Marine Science.

The motto of Gyeongsang National University(GNU) is Pioneer, and it states that the eyes of pioneers see far beyond the present to the future. The history of the university began as Jinju Agricultural College founded in Jinju in 1948, then, accredited as national college in 1968 and in 1972, renamed as Gyeongsang National College. In 1980, the college was accredited as a national university by the Ministry of Education and renamed Gyeongsang National University. For more than 60 years since its foundation, Gyeongsang National University has been educating talented students who have served not only for local community but also for national prosperity by leading them to be bigger assets in many places such as communities, industries, businesses, and around the country and the world.

Gyeongsang National University is well known for many achievements in applied life science along with biochemistry, agricultural science, and veterinary. One of these is that researchers at the university discovered a way to make cloned Turkish Angora cats glow red when exposed to ultraviolet light in 2007.

The Graduate School of Medicine and Public Health at Gyeongsang National University is a medical training and research institution in South Gyeongsang Province. Gyeongsang National University Hospital was opened with 419 beds in 1987 as the university hospital of Gyeongsang National University and is located next to the College of Medicine in the Chilam campus and has grown to a general and multispecialty medical hospital with 950 beds operating with specialty centers such as the local cancer center opened as the first local cancer center of its kinds in the country and rheumatoid arthritis center. Gyeongsang National University Hospital at Changwon is newly open as the second Gyeongsang National University Hospital in February 2016. The University Hospital at Changwon has begun with 208 beds and is going to grow according to the number of patients hospitalized.

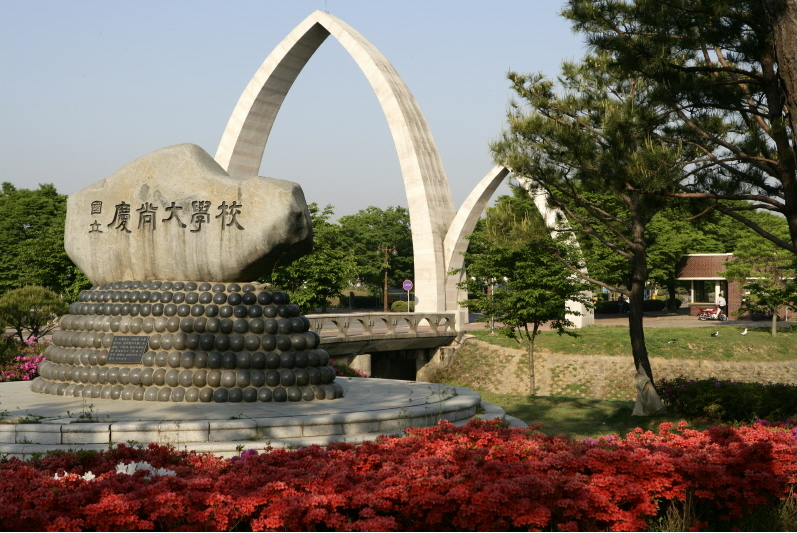
The gate

Overview of GNU's past and present

- October 20, 1948: Founded as Jinju Agricultural College by the provincial government of South Gyeongsang
- July 11, 1972: Accredited as Gyeongsang National College
- March 1, 1975: Established the graduate school
- March 1, 1980: Accredited as Gyeongsang National University by the government of Republic of Korea
- March 1, 1983: Established the College of Medicine
- February 21, 1987: Inaugurated the Gyeongsang National University Hospital
- March 1, 1988: Established the Graduate School of Business and Public Administration
- March 1, 1989: Established the College of Veterinary Medicine
- March 1, 1993: Established the College of Business Administration
- March 1, 1995: Established the College of Marine Science by merging the Tong-Yeong Junior College of Fisheries
- March 1, 1996: Established the Graduate School of Industry
- March 1, 2010: Graduate School of Public Health established
- December 16, 2011: Dr.Kwon Soon Ki appointed 9th President
- March 1, 2014: GNU has 10 Graduate Schools, 12 colleges, 3 Divisions (5 majors) and 87 Departments, with a total of 3,252 new Students every year

== Campus ==
Gyeongsang National University has four campuses. Two campuses are located in Jinju, one campus in Tongyeong, and one campus in Changwon. The Gajwa campus is located in Gajwa-dong, Jinju close to the junction of Tongyeong–Daejeon Expressway and Namhae Expressway, Chilam campus is located in Chilam-dong right next to Nam River, Tongyeong campus is located in Inpyeong-dong, Tongyeong, and Changwon campus is located in Uichang-gu, Changwon.

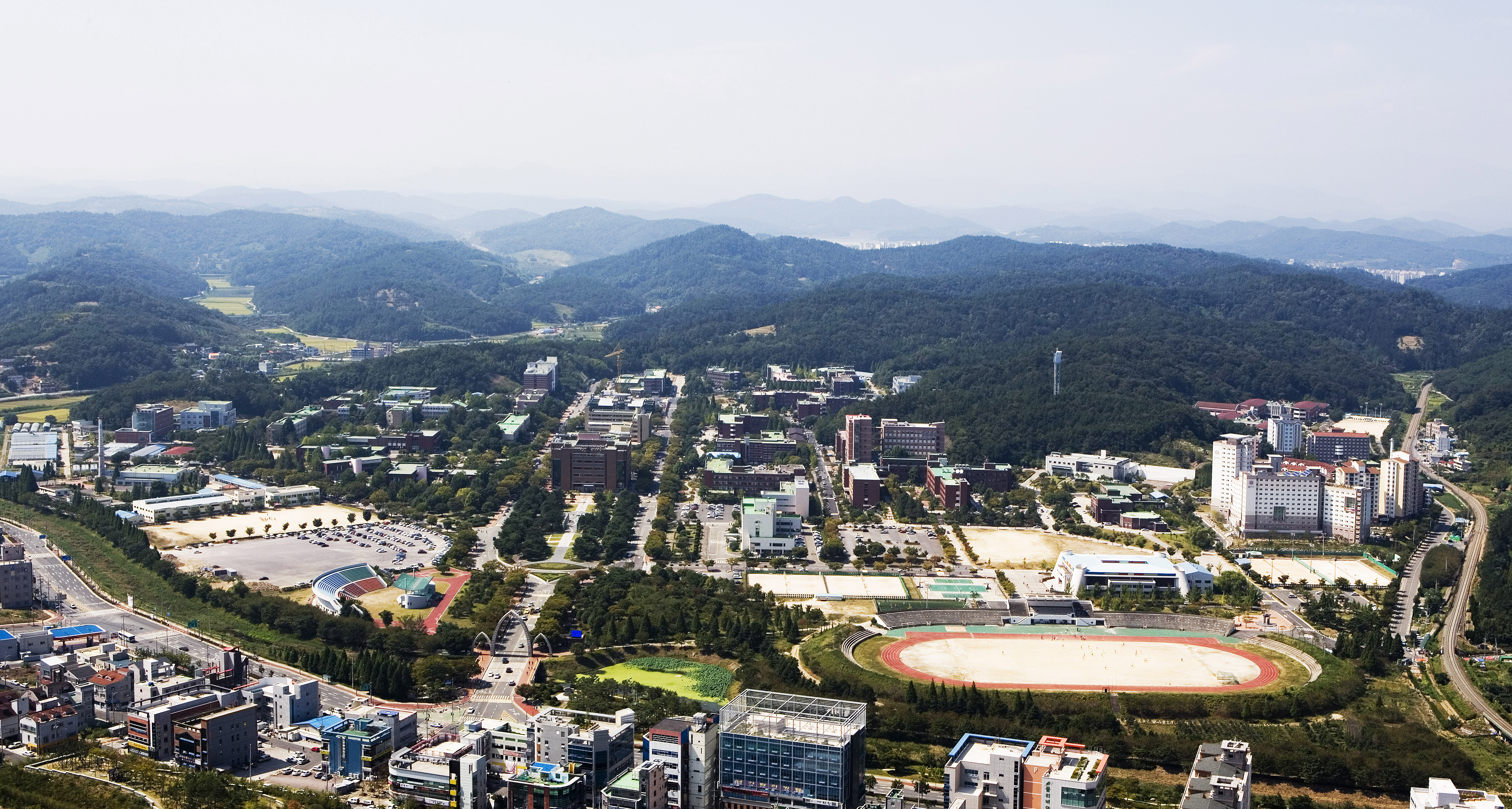
Aerial view of Gajwa campus

=== Gajwa Campus ===
The Gajwa campus is the main campus of Gyeongsang National University. Most buildings and facilities of the university including the university headquarters, the student center, and buildings for the colleges of arts, social science, law, education, business administration, natural science, agriculture and life science, engineering, veterinary, and graduate schools are located on the campus. The area of the Gajwa campus is more than 1,300,000 m^{2}, and buildings are more than sixty.

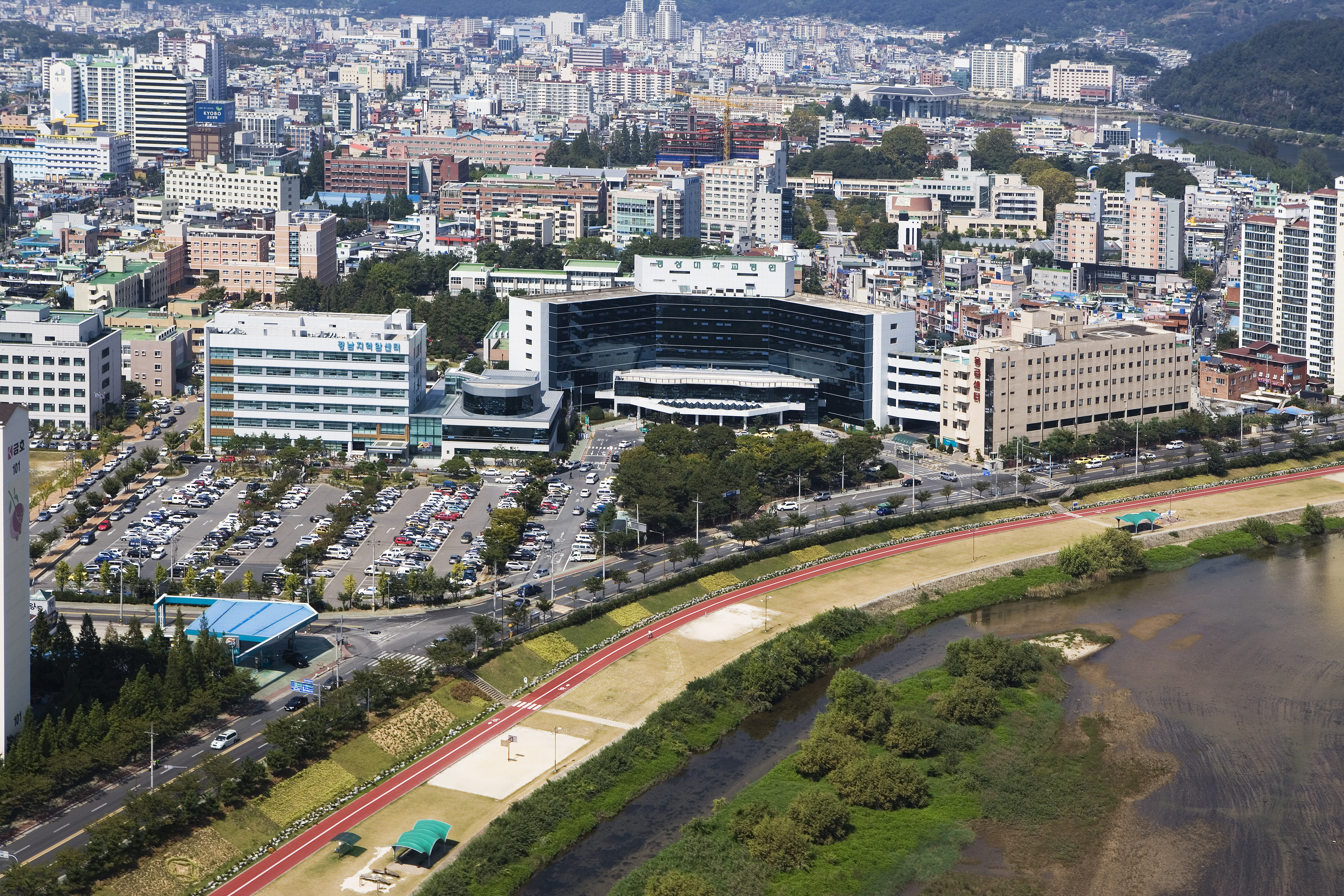
Aerial view of Chilam campus

=== Chilam Campus ===
The Gyeongsang National University Hospital, a unique facility for training medical students and nurses, is also located on the campus. The area of the campus is 103,000 m^{2}, and buildings such as a dormitory, student center, and medical library, are located.

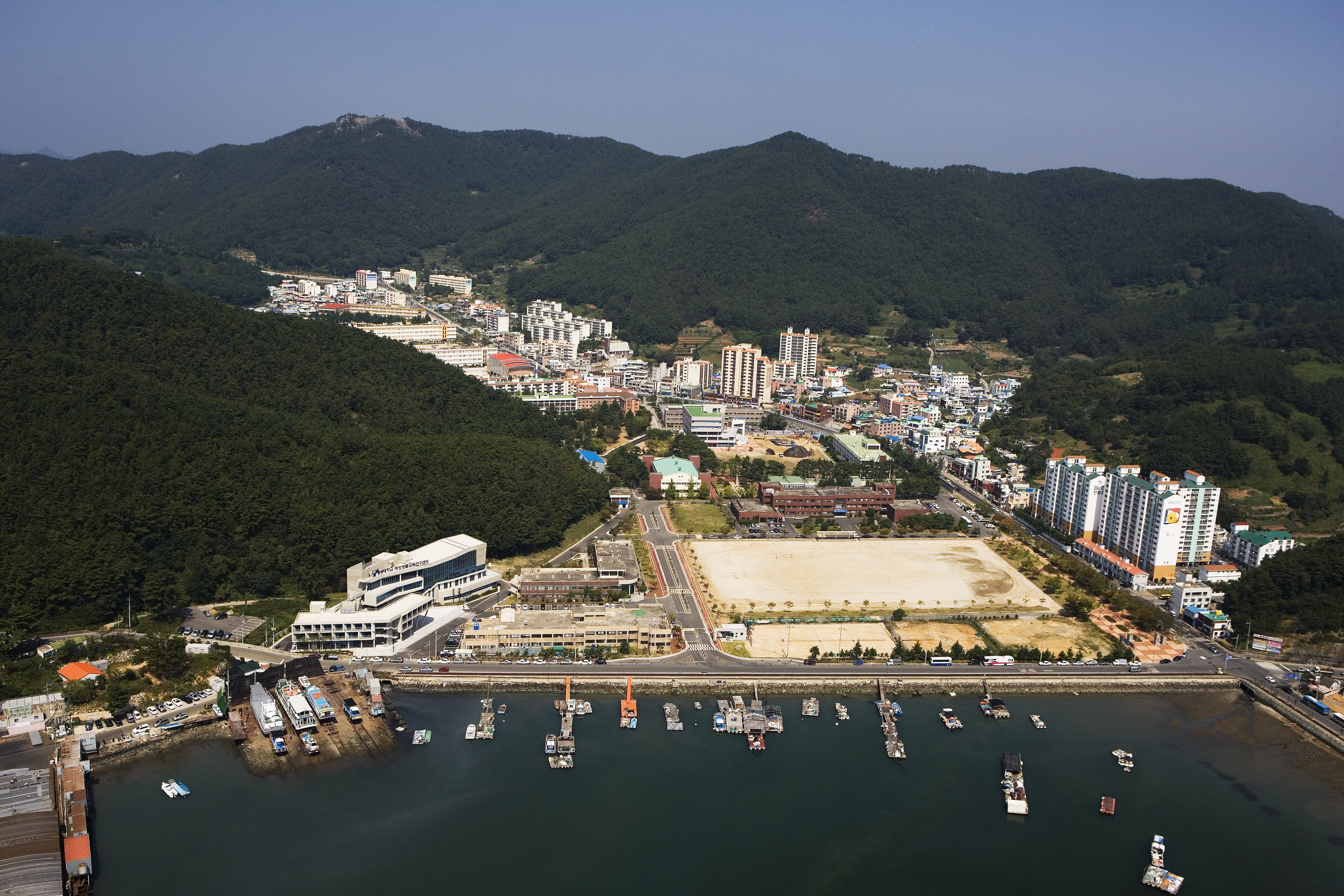
Aerial view of Tongyeong campus

=== Tongyeong Campus ===
The College of Marine Science is located in Inpyeong-dong, Tongyoung. The campus is home to ten departments for marine science in the college and has fifteen buildings including the college headquarters, education and research center, gym, library, student center, and female dormitory. The area of the campus is 147,000 m^{2}.

=== Changwon Campus ===
The Changwon campus is the industry-university convergence campus, founded in 2017. The Department of Mechanical Convergence Engineering is the only department that is located in the Changwon campus.

== Academic colleges ==
- College of Agriculture and Life Science
- College of Law
- College of Education
- College of Veterinary

=== Chilam Campus ===
- College of Nursing
- College of Medicine

=== Tongyeong Campus ===
- College of Marine Science

=== Changwon Campus ===
- Headquarters campus

== Graduate schools of professional studies ==
- Graduate School of Medicine
- Graduate School of Business
- Graduate School of Education
- Graduate School of Convergence Science & Technology
- Graduate School of Public Administration
- Graduate School of Aerospace Specialization
- Graduate School of Public Health
- Graduate School of Food & Medicine

=== Master's programs ===
- Humanities and social sciences
- Natural sciences
- Engineering
- Medicine
- Arts and athletics
- Interdisciplinary departments
- Industrial-academic collaboration
- Contract department

=== Doctoral programs ===
- Humanities and social sciences
- Natural sciences
- Engineering
- Medicine
- Arts and athletics
- Interdisciplinary departments
- Industrial-academic collaboration

=== Joint masters and doctoral programs ===
- Humanities and social sciences
- Natural sciences
- Engineering
- Medicine
- Arts and athletics
- Interdisciplinary departments

== See also ==
- Flagship Korean National Universities
- List of national universities in South Korea
- List of universities and colleges in South Korea
- Education in Korea
