= Jeju National University =

University in South Korea

Coordinates: 33°27′21″N 126°33′43″E

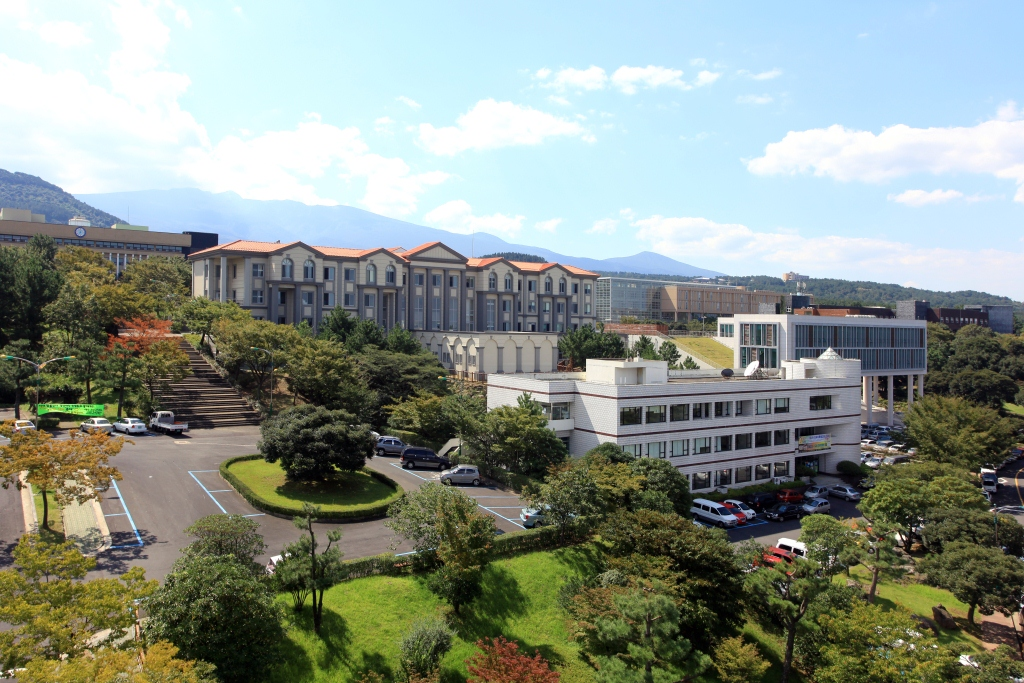
- Former name: Cheju Provincial Junior College (1952–1955); Cheju Provincial College (1955–1962); Cheju National College (1962–1982)
- Motto: 진리, 정의, 창조; Truth, Justice, Creativity
- Type: National
- Established: 1952; 74 years ago
- President: Yang Deok-soon (양덕순)
- Faculty: 1,402
- Administrative staff: 345
- Students: 10,518 (2014)
- Undergraduates: 15,898 (2010)
- Postgraduates: 2,364 (2010)
- Location: 102 Jejudaehak-ro, 특별자치도, Cheju, Jeju-do, South Korea, Jeju City, South Korea
- Campus: Suburban
- Mascots: Deer (노루, Capreolus capreolus)
- Website: www.jejunu.ac.kr

Korean name
- Hangul: 제주대학교
- Hanja: 濟州大學校
- RR: Jeju daehakgyo
- MR: Cheju taehakkyo

Jeju National University (Korean: 제주대학교) is one of ten Flagship Korean National Universities. Founded in 1952 in Jeju City, the provincial capital of Jeju, South Korea. In 2008 Cheju National University and the Jeju National University of Education merged into Jeju National University. The Naewat-dang shamanic paintings are preserved there.

== History ==
In 1952, Cheju Provincial Junior College was founded, and became a four-year college in 1955. It became Cheju National College in 1962, with faculties of law and science. The graduate school was established in 1979, and the college received university status in 1982.

== Academics ==
The university's diverse undergraduate offerings are divided among 12 colleges: the College of Art & Design, the College of Humanities, College of Law & Political Science, College of Economics & Commerce, College of Education, College of Applied Life Sciences, College of Ocean Science, College of Natural Sciences, College of Engineering, College of Medicine, Teachers College, and College of Veterinary Medicine. There are 6 graduate schools: Graduate School, Graduate School of Education, Graduate School of Business Administration, Graduate School of Public Administration, Graduate School of Industry, and Graduate School of Social Education. There are 3 professional graduate schools: Graduate School of Interpretation, School of Medicine, and Law School.

== Sister schools ==
The university has academic exchange relationships with 83 universities in 16 countries. The largest number of these are Chinese and Japanese. In addition, relationships have been established with 12 American Universities, 4 Russian Universities, France's Pierre-and-Marie-Curie University and University of Rouen, Germany's Bonn University and University of Tübingen, Canada's George Brown College England's University of Manchester, Norway's University of Oslo, Australia's University of Tasmania and School of Horticulture University of Western Sydney, Chile's Austral University of Chile, India's University of Delhi, 5 Taiwanese Universities, Vietnam's Can Tho University, Thailand's Chulalongkorn University and Burapha University, Mongolia's National University of Mongolia and Ulaanbaatar University, and Vietnam's Nguyen Tri Phuong Junior High-school.

University rankings

Regional – Overall
- QS Asia: =359 (2025)

== Notable people ==
- Go Doo-shim, actress

== See also ==
- Flagship Korean National Universities
- List of national universities in South Korea
- List of universities and colleges in South Korea
- Education in Korea
