= Jeonbuk National University =

South Korea University

- 전북대학교
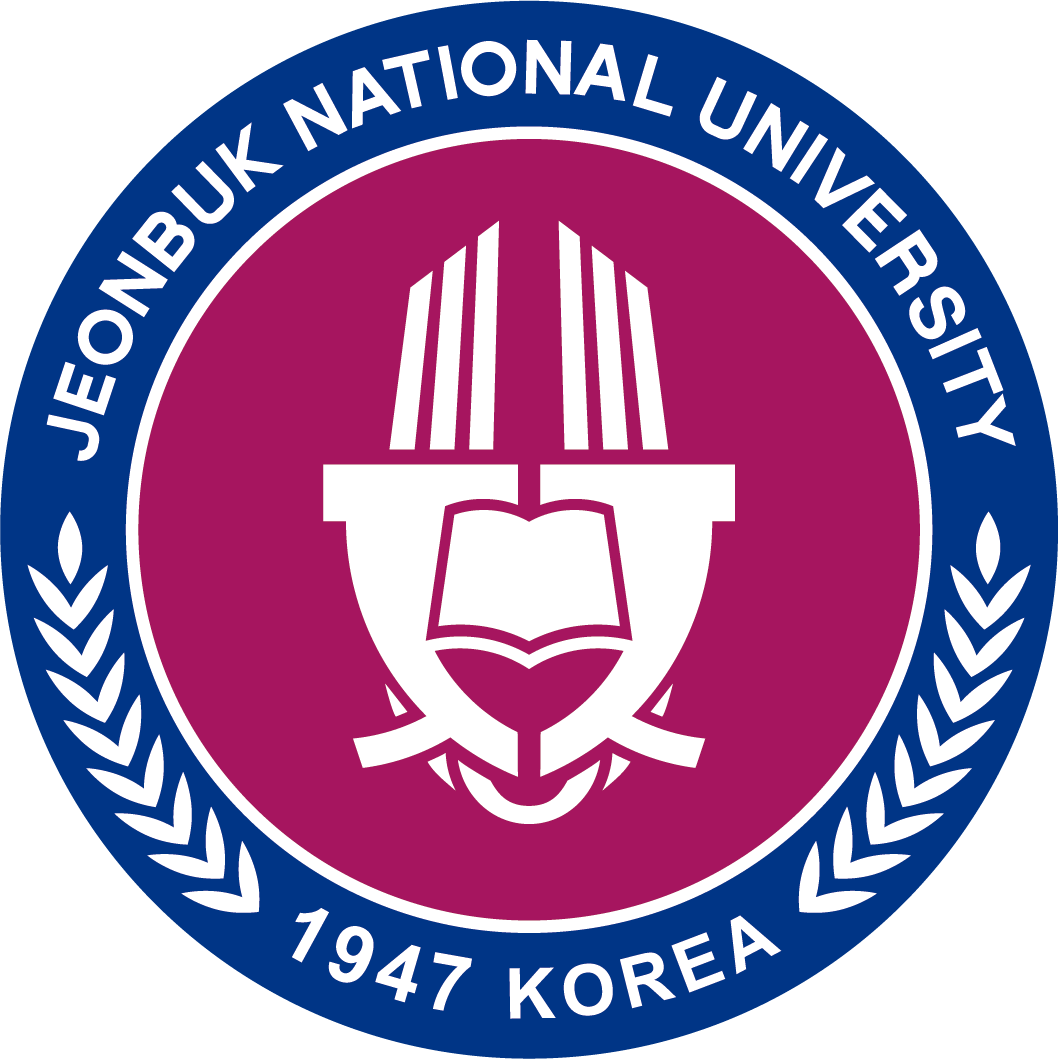
- Motto: 자유 · 정의 · 창조
- Motto in English: Freedom, Justice, Creativity
- Established: 1947; 79 years ago
- President: Yang O-bong (양오봉)
- Faculty: 1,030
- Administrative staff: 1,350
- Students: 22,000
- Location: Jeonju, North Jeolla, South Korea; 35°50′48.6″N 127°07′45.7″E
- Colors: Maroon; Blue
- Mascot: Amur Leopard (Panthera pardus orientalis)
- Website: jbnu.ac.kr/eng

Korean name
- Hangul: 전북대학교
- Hanja: 全北大學校
- RR: Jeonbuk daehakgyo
- MR: Chŏnbuk taehakkyo

Jeonbuk National University (JBNU; Korean: 전북대학교) is one of ten Flagship Korean National Universities founded in 1947, located in Jeonju, South Korea. Jeonbuk National University has been ranked 551–560th in the world by QS Top Universities Ranking in 2023.

== Overview ==
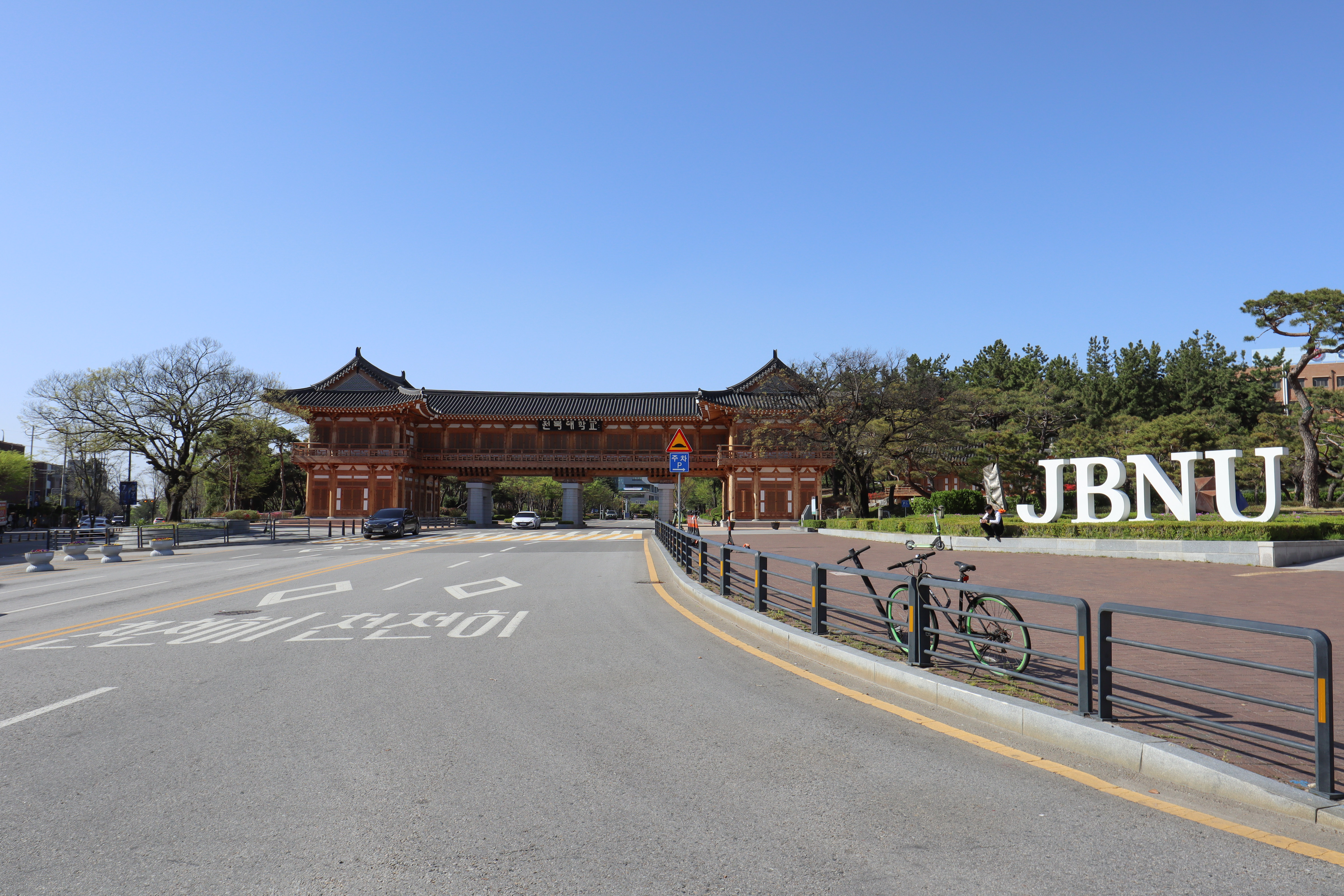
Jeonbuk National University main gate

Jeonbuk National University was founded in 1947 under the name of Jeonbuk National University, following the liberation of the Republic of Korea, by the Provincial fund within the framework of the Korean national university system; it is one of 10 Flagship Korean National Universities.

JBNU has grown to 16 colleges and 14 graduate schools (one general, nine specialized and four professional graduate schools).

JBNU's Jeonju campus provides approximately 32,000 enrolled students, and 2,000 faculty and staff members with educational, research and support facilities. JBNU maintains cooperative programs with international educational institutions, and more than 500 international students are enrolled in its degree programs, in addition to around 100 international researchers.

University rankings
JoongAng National	Domestic	19
QS National	General	22
THE National	General	22–27
USNWR National	General	49
QS Asia (Asia version)	General	118
THE Asia (Asia version)	General	=170
USNWR Asia	General	=234
ARWU World	Research	701–800
QS World	General	701-710
THE World	General	801–1000
USNWR World	General	=889

== Timeline ==
- 1947 Provincial Iri Agricultural College was founded.
- 1951 Jeonbuk National University was founded through combination of Provincial Iri Agricultural College, Jeonju Myeongnyun College and Gunsan College with 5 colleges (Engineering, Agriculture, Letters and Sciences, Law, and College of Commerce) and 16 departments with 2,700 students.
- 1952 First Graduate School was established.
- 1954 JBNU Press launched.
- 1955 Construction of Central Library was completed.
- 1970 Graduate School of Business Administration was established.
- 1970 College of Medicine was established.
- 1971 College of Education was established.
- 1975 JBNU Hospital was established, through acquisition of the provincial hospital.
- 1976 Graduate School of Education was established.
- 1976 JBNU High School affiliated with College of Education opened.
- 1980 College of Dentistry was established.
- 1981 Graduate School of Administration was established.
- 1982 College of Social Sciences was established.
- 1984 Graduate School of Environment was established.
- 1987 Hospital affiliated with College of Medicine was newly constructed.
- 1987 College of Arts was established.
- 1988 College of Veterinary Medicine was established.
- 1989 Graduate School of Industrial Technology was established.
- 1991 College of Life Sciences was established.
- 1992 Graduate School of Agricultural Development was established.
- 1993 Graduate School of Information Science was established.
- 1994 University Hospital transformed into a public corporation.
- 1994 Graduate School of Industrial Health was established.
- 1996 Social Education Center opened.
- 1997 JBNU Samsung Cultural Center opened.
- 1999 Student Service Center opened.
- 2001 Development Supporting Association was founded.
- 2001 Teaching Reference Room opened.
- 2002 Graduate School of Legal Affairs was established.
- 2003 Career Development Center for Female Students opened.
- 2003 Total Interpretation & Proofreading Service Center (TIPS) opened.
- 2003 University-industry Cooperation Foundation was established.
- 2005 Graduate School of Dental Medicine was established.
- 2005 College of Nursing was established.
- 2005 Construction of Woorim Human Resource Center was completed.
- 2006 Hunsan Gunji House (Jeonju Guesthouse) opened.
- 2006 Graduate School of Medicine was established.
- 2006 Construction of Life Science Center was completed.
- 2006 Construction of Seongwon Library of Law was completed.
- 2007 Legal Support Center opened.
- 2007 Obesity Research Center opened.
- 2008 Jeonbuk National University and Iksan National College were integrated (as Jeonbuk National University).
- 2008 College of Environment, Life & Nature was established.
- 2009 Faculty of Undeclared Majors was established.
- 2009 Residence halls (Chambit Hall, Hyemin Hall) opened.
- 2009 Graduate School of Law (law school) was established.
- 2009 Agriculture Meister College was established.
- 2009 Human Resources Center for New & Renewable Energy Industry opened.
- 2009 Acquired and started management of Korea Polytechnic Colleges V Gochang Campus.
- 2010 LED Agro-bio Fusion Technology Research Center opened.
- 2010 JBNU Academic & Cultural Center opened.
- 2010 Seoul Guesthouse opened.
- 2010 JBNU Beijing Office opened.
- 2010 Saebit Hall (residence hall) opened.
- 2010 SOK Lounge opened.
- 2011 Animal Disease Diagnostic Center opened.
- 2011 Korean Traditional Architecture Technology Center opened.
- 2011 Los Alamos National Laboratory-Jeonbuk National University (LANL-JBNU) Engineering Institute Korea opened.
- 2011 Advanced Undergraduate Education Project Group opened.
- 2011 JBNU Museum was newly constructed and opened.
- 2011 Graduate School of Flexible & Printed Electronics was established.
- 2012 Gochang Campus conducted the ribbon-cutting ceremony.
- 2012 Basic Liberal Arts Education Center opened.
- 2012 Saemangeum-Gunsan Campus conducted the ribbon-cutting ceremony.
- 2012 JBNU LINC (Leaders in Industry University Cooperation) launched.
- 2012 Faculty of International Studies was established.
- 2013 Degree & Research Center opened.
- 2013 Tree Diagnostic Center opened.
- 2013 LED Plant Factory opened.
- 2013 Iksan Campus changed its name to Specialized Campus.
- 2013 Global University-Industry Cooperation Center opened.
- 2013 Happy Dream Center (center for mental health) opened.
- 2013 Irumteo (social volunteer center) opened.
- 2014 LED Plant Factory in Vietnam opened.
- 2014 Central Library was newly constructed and opened.
- 2014 High-enthalpy Plasma Research Center opened.
- 2014 Construction of Nursing Clinical Center opened.
- 2014 Infinite Imagination Chamber opened.
- 2014 Institute for Agrobio Food Research & Development opened.
- 2014 Entrance Counseling Center opened.
- 2014 JBNU Thrifty Shop opened.
- 2014 Prof. Namho Lee inaugurated as the 17th president.
- 2015 Center for Children's Foodservice Management opened.
- 2015 Department of Veterinary Medicine was relocated to Specialized Campus.
- 2015 Signed an MOU with Jeonbuk Hyundai Motors Football Club.
- 2015 Drug Development Center opened.
- 2015 Signed an MOU with the Carter Center.
- 2015 Korea Zoonosis Research Institute opened.
- 2015 Public Safety Information Technology Research Center opened.
- 2015 OMiLAB Korea Research Center opened.
- 2015 Haedong Academic Library opened.
- 2015 Center for International Student Services launched.
- 2016 Faculty of International Studies changed its name into Jimmy Carter School of International Studies.
- 2016 LED Agro-bio Fusion Technology Research Center opened a Vietnamese office in Hochiminh.
- 2016 Center for Disease Control and Prevention opened.
- 2016 Medical Science Hall was completed.
- 2016 Annex to University-Industry Cooperation opened.
- 2016 New Silk Road Center (center for international exchange) opened.
- 2017 Modern UI (University Identity) was introduced.
- 2017 JBNU Korea Center opened in Pasundan University, Indonesia.
- 2017 Yeocheon Choi Onsoon Traditional Fashion Center opened.
- 2017 Center for Humanities & Social Sciences opened.
- 2017 University Affiliated Energy & Resources Development Institute opened.
- 2017 Center for Jeongup Industry-Academy-Institute Cooperation was established.
- 2018 Global Frontier College was established.
- 2018 Construction of 70th Anniversary Agora and Street were completed.
- 2018 Regional Innovation Collaboration Office was launched.
- 2019 Jeonbuk National University officially changed its name to Jeonbuk National University.

== Undergraduate studies ==
- College of Agriculture and Life Sciences: Agricultural Biology, Agricultural Economics, Animal Biotechnology, Animal Science, Bio-industrial Machinery Engineering, Bioenvironmental Chemistry, Community Construction Engineering, Crop Agriculture & Life Science, Food Science & Technology, Forest Environment Science, Horticultural Science, Landscape Architecture, Smart Farm, Wood Science & Technology
- College of Arts: Dance, Fine Arts, Industrial Design, Korean Music, Music
- College of Commerce: Business Administration, Commerce & Trade, Economics
- College of Dentistry
- College of Education: Education, English Education, Ethics Education, Geography education, German Language Education, History Education, Korean Language Education, Mathematics Education, Physical Education, Science Education, Social Studies Education
- College of Engineering: Aerospace Engineering, Architectural Engineering, Biomedical Engineering, Chemical Engineering, Civil Engineering, Computer System Engineering, Convergence Technology Engineering, Electrical Engineering, Electronic Engineering, Environmental Engineering, Industrial Information Systems Engineering, Intelligent Material Science & Engineering, IT Applied Systems Engineering, Macromolecule & Nano-Engineering, Mechanical Design Engineering, Mechanical Engineering, Mechanical System Engineering, Metallurgical System Engineering, Municipal Engineering, Nano-Bio Mechanical System Engineering, Organic Materials & Fiber Engineering, Polymer Nano Science & Technology, Resources & Energy Engineering, Social Infrastructure Engineering, Software Engineering, Urban Engineering, Computer Science & Engineering, Electronic Materials Engineering & Quauntum System Engineering
- College of Environmental and Bioresource Sciences: Bioresource Distribution Economy, Biotechnology, Environmental & Bioresource Sciences, Food Science & Biotechnology, Herbal Medicine Resources
- College of Human Ecology: Child Studies, Clothing & Textiles, Food & Nutrition, Residential Environment
- College of Humanities: Archaeology and Cultural Anthropology, Chinese Literature, English Literature, French Literature, German Literature, History, Japanese Literature, Korean Language Literature, Library and Information Science, Philosophy, Spanish, Central and South American Literature
- College of Medicine: Medicine (Medical Science)
- College of Natural Sciences: Chemistry, Earth and Environmental Sciences, Life Sciences, Mathematics, Molecular Biology, Physics, Science Studies, Sports Science, Statistical Informatics, Semiconductor Science & Technology
- College of Nursing: Nursing
- College of Social Science: Mass Communication, Political Science and Diplomacy, Psychology, Public Administration, Social Welfare, Sociology
- College of Veterinary Medicine: Veterinary Medicine
- Global Frontier College: School of International Engineering and Science, The School of International Studies
- Faculty of Public Policy

== General graduate school ==
- Arts/Physical Education: Dance, Fine Arts, Industrial Design, Korean Music, Music, Physical Education
- Engineering: Aerospace Engineering, Architecture & Urban Engineering, BIN Fusion Engineering, Civil Engineering, Convergence Technology Engineering, Electrical Engineering, Electrical Engineering, Electronic & Information Engineering (Computer Engineering), Electronic & Information Engineering (Electronic Engineering), Electronic & Information Material Engineering, Environmental Engineering, Industrial System Engineering, IT Application System Engineering, Material Science, Mechanical Design, Mechanical Engineering, Mechanical System Engineering, Metallurgical Engineering, Organic Fiber Engineering, Polymer & Nano Science & Technology, Resources & Energy Engineering, Semi-conductor & Chemical Engineering Faculty, Software Engineering
- Humanities & Social Sciences: Accounting, Business Administration, Chinese Language & Literature, Cultural Anthropology & Archaeology, Economics, Education, English Language & Literature, French Language & Literature, German Language & Literature, History, Japanese Language & Literature, Korean Language & Literature, Korean Society & Ethics, Language & Literature Education, Law, Library & Information Science, Mass Communication, Philosophy, Politics, Psychology, Public Administration, Social Science, Social Science Education, Social Welfare, Spanish & Central/South American Literature, Trade
- Natural Sciences: Agricultural Biology, Agricultural Chemistry, Agricultural Economics, Agricultural Engineering, Agriculture, Animal Science, Bio-industry Machinery Engineering, Biology, Chemistry, Earth & Environmental Science, Ecological Landscape Design, Food Science & Technology, Forestry, Forestry Engineering, Herbal Resources, Horticulture, Housing Environment, Human Ecology, Landscape Engineering, Mathematics, Nursing, Physics, Science, Science Education, Statistic Information
- Academia Joint Courses: Agricultural Biology, Agricultural Chemistry, Agricultural Economics, Agricultural Engineering, Agriculture, Animal Science, Bio-industrial Mechanical Engineering, Biology, Electrical Engineering, Electronic Material Engineering, Electronics & Information (Computer Engineering), Electronics & Information (Electronic Engineering), Food Science & Technology, Forestry, Forestry Engineering, Horticulture, Hydrogen & Fuel Cell Engineering, Image Engineering, Information & Communication, Landscape Engineering, Material Engineering, Metallurgy Engineering, New Organic Material Engineering, Polymer Nano Engineering, Semiconductor Chemical Engineering
- Interdisciplinary: Applied Plasma Engineering, Bio & Nano System Engineering, Bio-industrial Precision Machinery Engineering, Bioactive Material Science, Bioprocess Engineering, Biotechnology, Clinical Speech Pathology, Cognitive Science, Design & production Engineering, Ecological Landscape Design, Electronic Material Engineering, Energy Engineering, English Education, Healthcare Engineering, Hydrogen & Fuel Cell Engineering, Image Engineering, Information & Communication, Information Security Engineering, Intelligent Automotive system engineering, International Cyber Trade & Area Studies, IT Integrated System Engineering, Korean Music, Mechatromics Engineering, Medical Nutrition Therapy, Nano Semiconductor Display, Nano Technology, New Organic Material Engineering, Radiation Technology, Records Management, Sports Science, Technology & Culture, Technology & Public Policy

== Specialized & professional graduate schools ==
- Graduate School of Business Administration: Accounting, Business Administration, Industrial Economics, Trade
- Graduate School of Education: Adolescent Education & Guidance, Agricultural Education, Biology Education, Chemistry Education, Chinese Language & Literature Education, Clothing & Textiles Education, Commerce Education, Computer Science Education, Early Childhood Education, Earth Science Education, Educational Administration, Educational Methodology, Educational Psychology, English Language Education, Environmental Education, Ethics Education, Fine Arts Education, Food Preparation Education, Geography Education, German Language Education, History Education, Home Economics Education, Japanese Language Education, Korean Language Education, Library & Information Science Education, Mathematics Education, Music Education, Nursing Education, Philosophy Education, Physical Education, Physics Education, Sino-Korean Education, Social Education, Spanish Language Education
- Graduate School of Environment, Life & Resources: Architecture Environment, Environmental Engineering, Environmental Planning
- Graduate School of Industrial Technology: Industry Technology, Information Technology
- Graduate School of Information Science: Archives Management, Computer Information, Environment Information, Genetics Information, Library & Information, Management Information, Statistics Information
- Graduate School of Legal Affairs: Civil Law, Corporate law, Criminal Private Law, Labor & Welfare Law, Law of Real Estate, Local Government Law, Medical Law, Tax Law
- Graduate School of Natural Resources & Life Sciences
- Graduate School of Public Health: Health Management, Industry Health
- Graduate School of Public Administration: Journalism, Local Government, Public Administration, Psychology, Social Welfare, Sociology
- Graduate School of Dentistry: Dentistry
- Graduate School of Flexible Printed Electronics
- Graduate School of Law (Law School)
- Graduate School of Medicine (Medical School): Anatomy, Biochemistry, Forensic Medicine, Immunology, Medical Education, Microbiology, Pathology, Pharmacology, Physiology, Preventive Medicine & Public Health, Anesthesiology & Pain medicine, Biomedical Engineering, Dermatology, Diagnostic Radiology, Emergency Medicine, Internal Medicine, Laboratory Medicine, Nuclear Medicine, Neurology, Neurosurgery, Obstetrics & Gynecology, Ophthalmology, Orthopedic Surgery, Otorhinolaryngology, Pediatrics, Plastic & Reconstructive Surgery, Psychiatry, Radiation Oncology, Rehabilitation Medicine, Surgery, Thoracic & Cardiovascular Surgery, Urology

== See also ==
- Flagship Korean National Universities
- List of national universities in South Korea
- List of universities and colleges in South Korea
- Education in Korea
