= Chungnam National University =

University in Daejeon, South Korea

- 충남대학교
- Type: National
- Established: 1952; 74 years ago
- President: Kim Jeong Kyoum (김정겸)
- Location: Yuseong, Daejeon, South Korea; 36°22′08″N 127°20′46″E
- Campus: Urban (Daedeok and Munhwa Campi)
- Website: cnu.ac.kr

Korean name
- Hangul: 충남대학교
- Hanja: 忠南大學校
- RR: Chungnam daehakgyo
- MR: Ch'ungnam taehakkyo

Chungnam National University (CNU; Korean: 충남대학교) is one of ten Flagship Korean National Universities located in Daejeon, South Korea.

== History ==
Chungnam National University was founded in 1952. Its motto is "Creativity, Development, and Service to the community". Situated in the central region of the Korean peninsula, CNU is located near the Daedeok R&D Special District, the Multifunctional Administrative City, the Daejeon Government Complex, and the Headquarters of the Korean Army, Air Force, and Navy.

== Colleges and departments ==
=== Humanities ===
The College of Humanities offers programs in linguistic, literary, cultural, and human science fields.

=== Social Sciences ===
The college was established on March 1, 1990, as a separate division from the College of Humanities and College of Law. The main aim of the college is to provide students with academic, scientific, and professional knowledge in the fields of social sciences. The College of Social Sciences consists of eight departments.

=== Natural Sciences ===
The College of Natural Sciences aims at enabling students to acquire broad general education in the natural sciences and, its policy of emphasizing basic sciences encourages students and professors to exchange knowledge and research in conjunction with the adjacent Daedeok Research Complex.

=== Economics and Management ===
The College of Economics and Management aims to produce scholars who can contribute to economic planning and business administration in the industrial corporations of the country. The college holds seminars and special lectures and runs a computer center for the students so that they can get theories and do advanced research in economics and management.

=== Engineering ===
The College of Engineering, which boasts the longest history and the largest number of departments is one of the representative colleges of Chungnam National University. Adjacent to Daedeok Science Town, the birthplace of science and technology in Korea, CNU is able to maintain a close relationship with the research centers within the Science Town.

The faculty contributes to the development of industry in Korea through cooperating with the research centers run by private companies and governmental branches.

In 1994, the college was designated a State Policy College of Engineering. In 1999 it received designation as a college supported by the government-sponsored BK 21 project, and was awarded government funds to improve the environment of education and research. In the process, it created the foundation which leads to the famous College of Engineering.

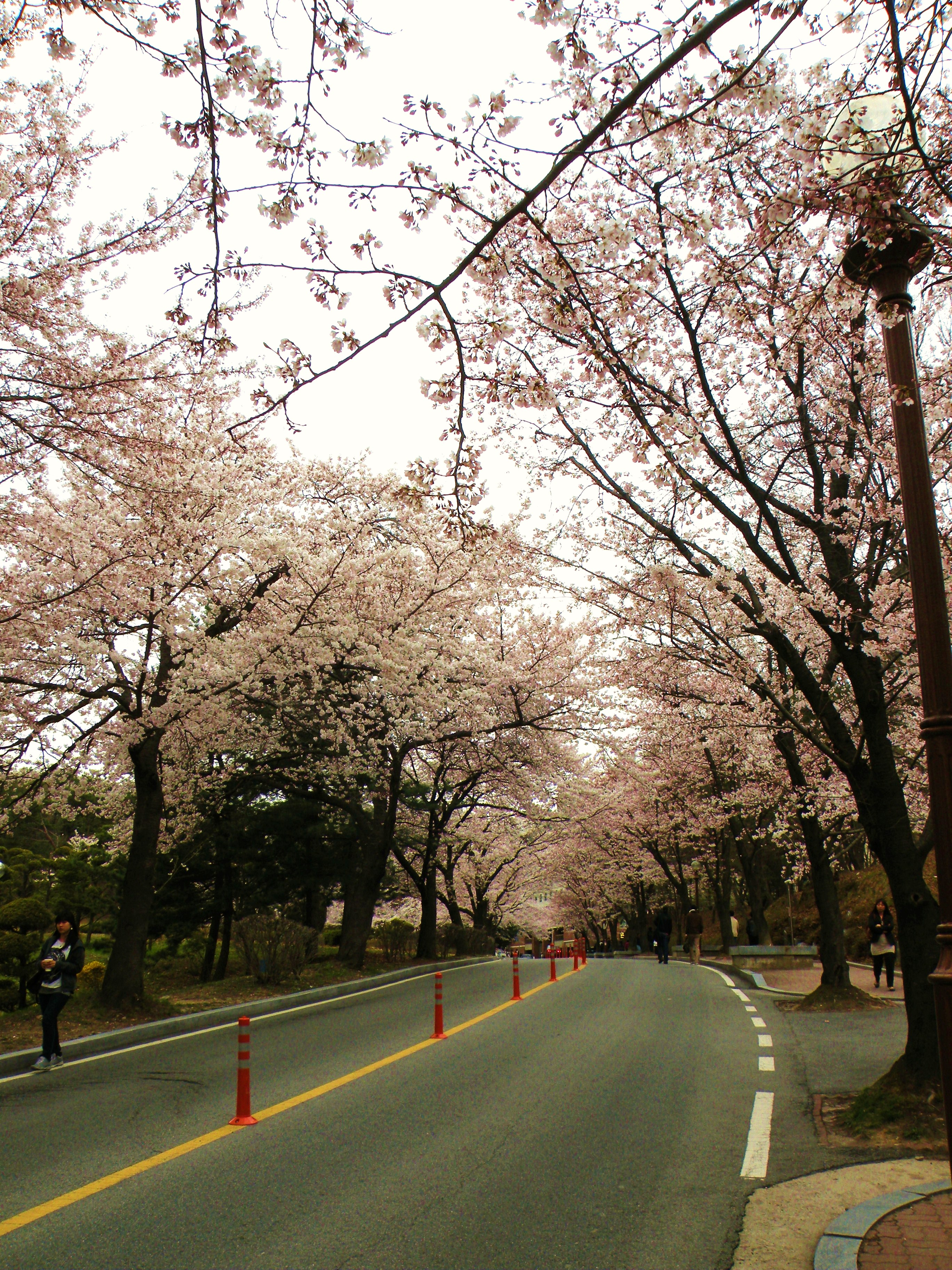
Cherry trees line the streets of CNU

=== Agriculture and Life Sciences ===
The College of Agriculture and Life Sciences was started in 1952. It consists of botanical resource division, zoological resource division, environmental forestry resource division, applied biological chemical food division, bioresources engineering division, and agricultural economy division.

There are 70 faculty members and 1900 undergraduate students and 300 graduate students who devote themselves to education and research in the research centers such as the agricultural farms, animal farms, the experiment forest, and agricultural science research center.

In 1996, the College of Agriculture and Life Sciences was selected as a specialized college to cultivate ginseng, fruits, and vegetables. It introduced modern experimental equipment, the high-tech green house, and an experimental barn working by environmental adjustment.

In 2001, the first KT&G agricultural life science building in Korea was built. In 2002 a research center that focuses on converting the characters of cloned pigs was founded on funds and the sponsorship of the Korea Science foundation.

Research funds of more than 100 million Won and experimental equipment were provided to launch the international research and education center.

=== Law ===
The college aims at producing scholars and legal officials with knowledge in the fields of law and civil service. The college also aims at producing legal specialists such as judges and prosecutors who can contribute to the realization of peace and justice through legal knowledge. Students participate in a moot court, moot National Assembly exercises, and legal counseling exercises.

The college has graduated approximately 2,000 alumni.

Due to the establishment of the graduate J.D. program, the law school no longer admits undergraduate law students. The LL.B. program will be gradually phased out in favor of the Law School's graduate programs. CNU Law currently enrolls 100 students in each class of the J.D. program.

=== Pharmacy ===
The college aims at producing specialists who study and use pharmacological theories and practice.

=== Human Ecology ===
The purposes of the college are to teach international academic theories in the fields of home and society and to instruct students in the ideal management of food, clothing, and shelter and cooperation with society and business in achieving goals.

=== Fine Arts and Music ===
The college provides research to develop culture in art and music. Students and alumni participate in art and music activities and express their creativity through concerts and exhibitions.

=== Veterinary Medicine ===
The present college of Veterinary Medicine was reorganized in March 1991 from the Department of Veterinary Medicine under the College of Agriculture and Life Sciences to the College of Veterinary Medicine. With its professional programs, the college produces specialists who conduct research on the anatomy of animals and their diseases.

=== Education ===
The College of Education was established on March 1, 2009, yet the university has been providing teacher training since 1970. Most of graduates from the college serve for the position as secondary school teacher, educational administrator and university faculty.

=== Faculty of Liberal Arts ===
The faculty of liberal arts, a faculty where students are free from fitting into one of the established major areas was established on March 1, 2009. The faculty provides students with academic disciplines including studies in humanities, social sciences and science & technology and fine arts.

== Research institutes ==
- Furniture Industry Research Institute
- Management & Economics Research Institute
- Research Center for Advanced Magnetic Materials
- Cooperative Animal Experiment Center
- Engineering Education Institute
- Educational Research & Development Institute
- Rapidly Solidified Material Research Center
- Nano New Materials Engineering Center
- Institute of Agricultural Science &Technology
- Baekje Research Institute
- Institute of Law
- American-Canadian Studies Institute
- Institute of Social Science
- Industrial Technology Lab
- Institute of Life Sciences
- Research Institute of Human Ecology
- Material Chemical Lab
- Software Research Center
- Center for Asian Regional Studies
- Research Institute for Properties of Quantum-controlling Matter
- Survey Research Institute
- Women's Policy Research Institute
- Art Culture Research Institute
- Confucianism Research Institute
- Humanities Research Institute
- Internet Intrusion Response Technology Research Center
- Electric Wave Research Institute
- ElectroMagnetic Environment Research Center
- Information & Communication Research Institute
- Policy Research Institute for Small and Medium-sized Businesses
- Institute for Public Affairs(IPA)
- High-tech Vehicle Research Institute
- Research Institute of Physical Education &
- Sports Science
- Chungcheong Cultural Research
- Unification Research Institute
- Institute of Peace and Security Studies
- Research Institute of Marine Sciences
- Research Center for Transgenic Cloned Pigs
- Institute of Environment and Biosystem
- Accounting Research Institute
- Natural Science Lab
- Institute of Mathematical Sciences
- Institute of Applied Chemistry and Biological Engineering
- Nano-Engineering Research Institute
- Architectural Research Institute
- Architecture & Disaster Prevention Lab
- Plant Genomics Lab
- Institute of Scientific Criminal Investigation
- Research Center for International Technology Cooperation
- Research Center for Daedeok Patent Policy
- New Material Lab
- Institute of Biotechnology
- Co-operative Cancer Research Institute
- Research Institute of Medical Engineering
- Brain Science Research Institute
- Institute of Drug Research & Development
- Institute of Medical Science
- Nursing Science Institute
- Veterinary Medicine & Science Lab
- Basic Science Research Institute

== Rankings ==
University rankings
JoongAng National	Domestic	20
QS National	General	26–27
THE National	General	22–27
ARWU National	Research	19–23
QS Asia (Asia version)	General	=193
THE Asia (Asia version)	General	201–250
ARWU World	Research	701–800
QS World	General	851–900
THE World	General	801–1000
USNWR World	General	=844

== Notable people ==
- Kang Boo-ja, South Korean actress and politician
- Cho Mina, South Korean poet

== Gallery ==
Main Library of Daejeon campus

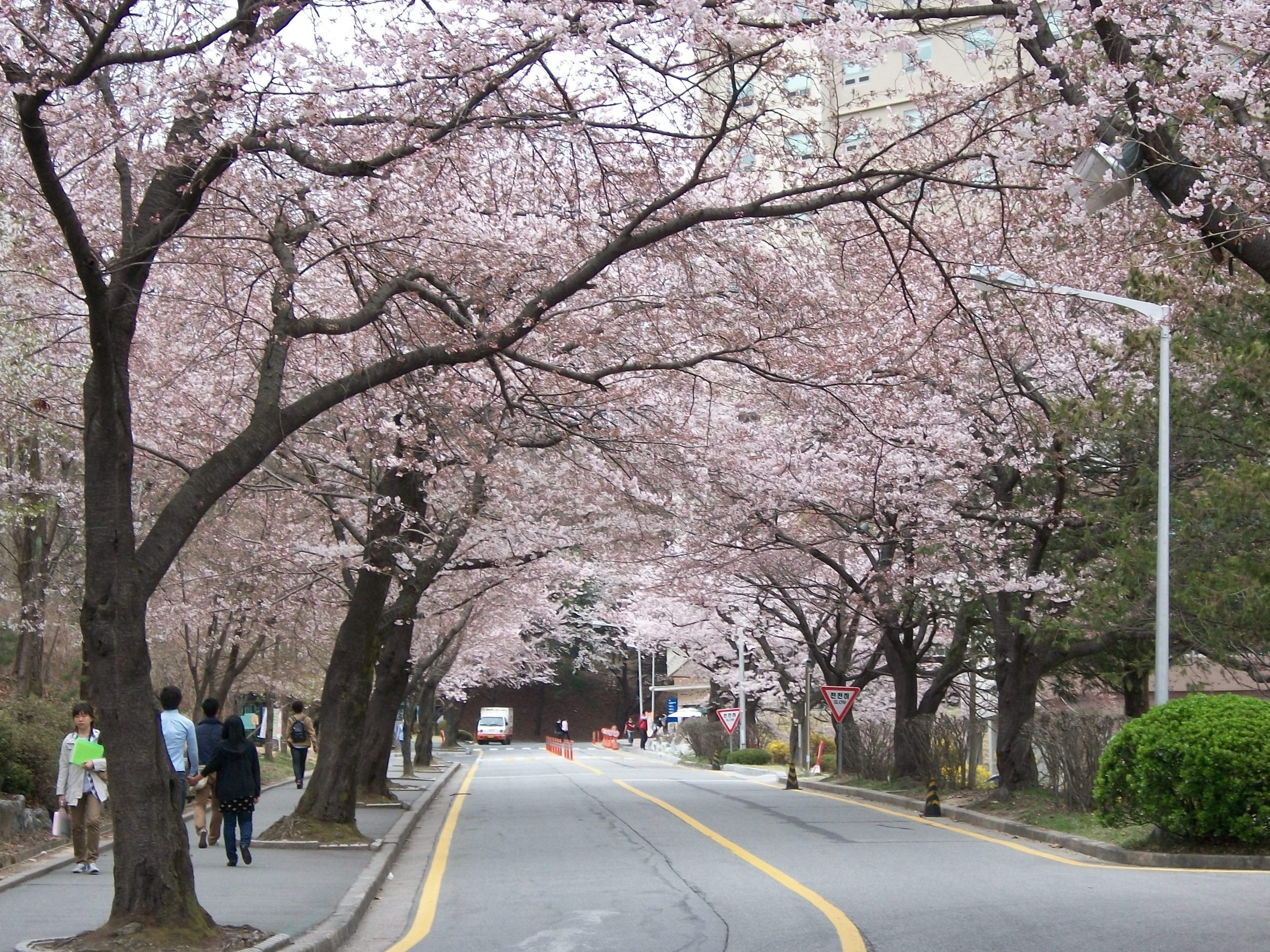
Blossoming cherry trees over a street in CNU's Daejeon campus

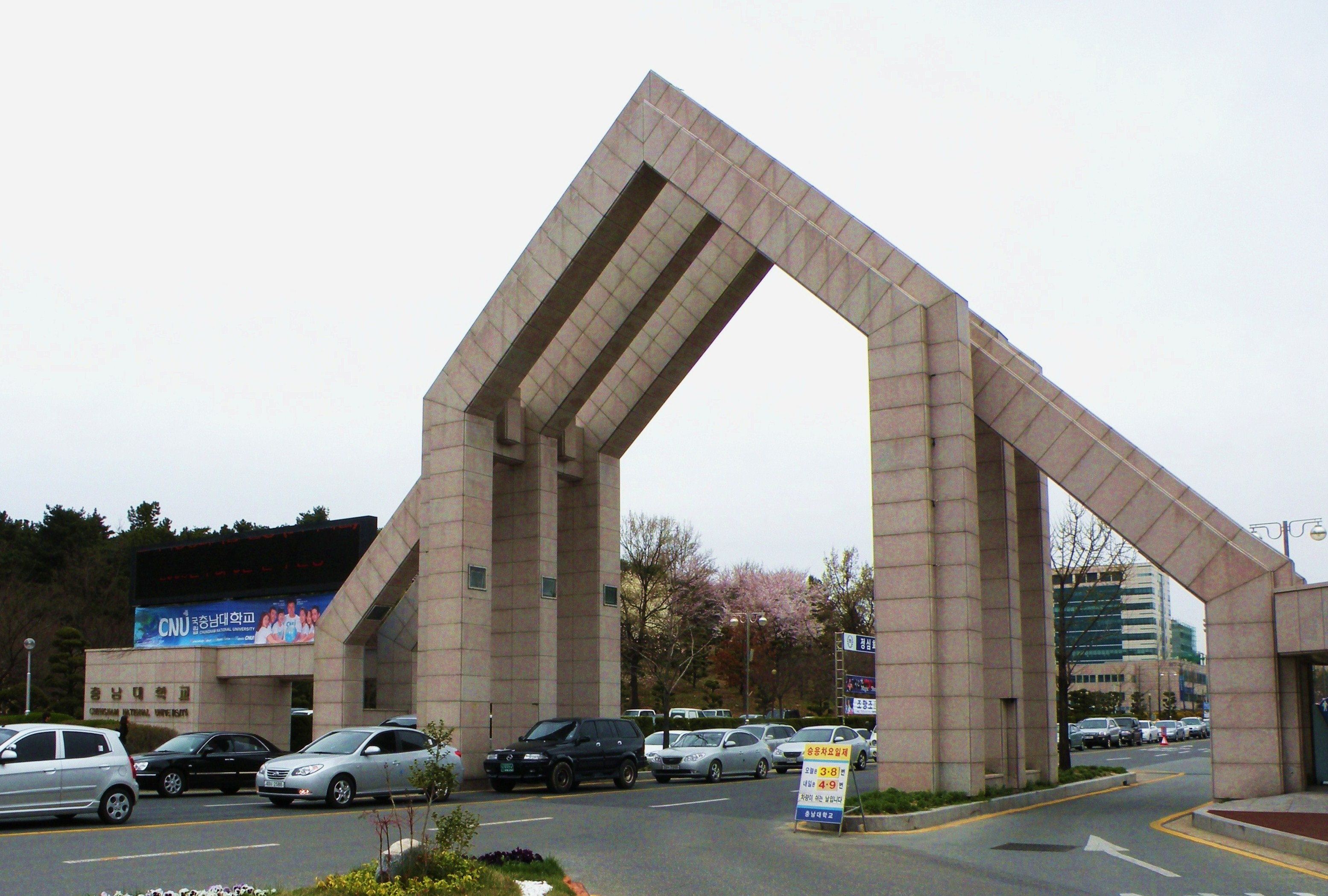
Main entrance to CNU campus

== See also ==
- Flagship Korean National Universities
- List of national universities in South Korea
- List of universities and colleges in South Korea
- Education in Korea
