= Toufoula =

Lebanese non-governmental organization

Toufoula طفولــة
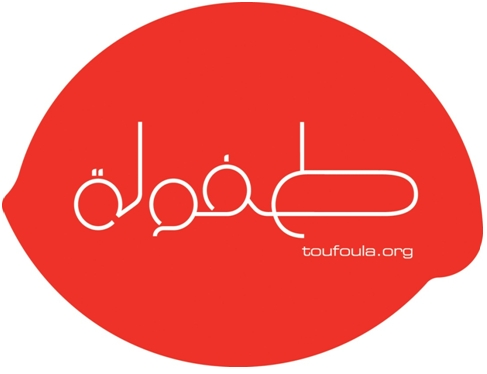
- Founded: April 2006
- Type: NGO
- Purpose: "Designing a "dream floor" ward in all hospitals where children receive therapy" .
- Location: Lebanon, Badaro, Sami Al Solh Ave., Youssef center
- Region served: Lebanon
- Method: Cancer research, Endowments, and Education.
- Website: toufoula.org

Toufoula is a Lebanese voluntary health organization dedicated to improve the quality of life of children suffering from cancer and blood diseases by designing and creating a unique and colorful environments aimed at offering a safe haven throughout their treatment. Toufoula was co-founded in 2006 by a group of young volunteers in Beirut, Lebanon.

The word toufoula is Arabic (طفولة) for "Childhood" and the organization mission is to improve the quality of life of children suffering from cancer or blood diseases.

== Dream Room Project ==
Toufoula's main project is the "Dream Rooms" and its aim is to design a "dream floor" ward in all hospitals where children receive therapy. Dream Rooms aim at derailing the children from the arduous treatment and journey while hospitalized. To that end, Toufoula co-founders started this initiative by upbringing of the idea that was then extrapolated via the collaborative work with other architects and designers. Toufoula had a number of designs submitted namely by Bernard Khoury, Celia Arbid, Nadim Karam, Simone Kosremelli, Raed Abi Lameh, Karim Chaya, Nada Debs, Erga group: Randa and Elie Gebrayel, Jean Louis Mainguy, Karen Chikerjian, Michele Maria Chaya, Lina Ghotmeh, JWT, Zuhair Murad, Rabih Keyrouz, Gina Succar, Michele Stanjovsky, Jalal Mahmoud, Sary El Khazen and IB2 who contributed a lot for Toufoula by advertising for the concept of the Dream Room project by a slogan " No Color, No life " noticing that IB2 is an expansion unit of Impact BBDO.

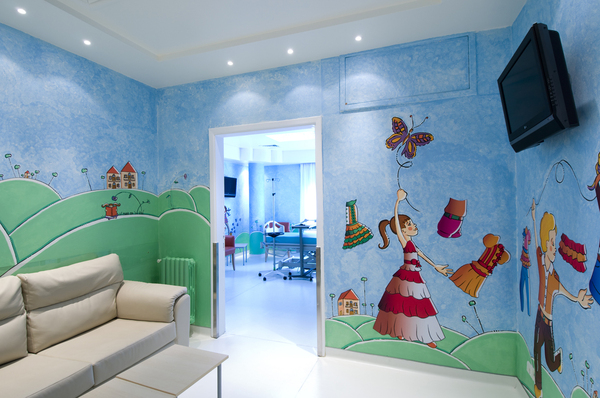
Zuhair Murad: Taking the kids out of their reality and allowing them to imagine they are designers themselves by mixing and matching the different options of garments on the imaginary characters on the wall.

This project is to be implemented in all the hospitals that have oncology hematology wards all around Lebanon. It has been implemented in three major hospitals already since the year 2008:

- Hotel Dieu de France (HDF): 18 rooms, a playroom and a corridor were executed, their total cost was $195,983 granted from an individual donor. The ward in HDF is in memory of Myrna Baz.
- Rafik Hariri University Hospital: 4 rooms were executed, their total cost was $20,471 by donors such as Kockache, Procter and Gamble.
- Al Makassed Hospital: 8 rooms, they cost a total of $53,970 from donors such as HSBC, Roche, Novartis and individual funds.
- Currently, Notre Dame des Secours funded by the Choueiri family in the memory of M.Antoine Choueiry.

Toufoula has set a goal, that by 2012 all pediatric oncology hospital rooms in Lebanon will be changed into dream rooms. The hospitals that admit cancer kids in Lebanon are: Rafik Hariri University Hospital, Saint George Hospital - Beirut, Jeitawi, Hotel Dieu, Rizk, Makassed, Notre Dame Des Secours Nini Tripoli and Hammoud Saida.

== Objectives ==
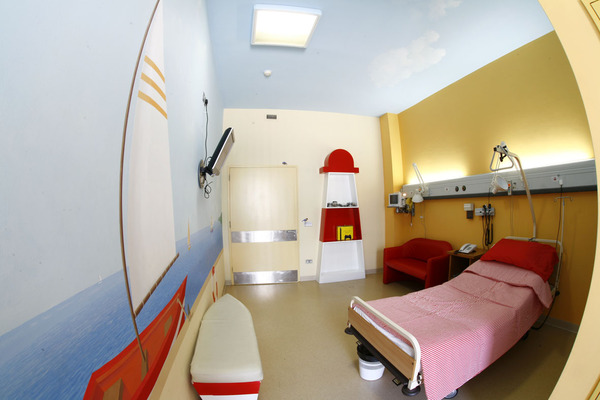
Gina Succar: A sea, sand and sky room where the child is like a free bird

Toufoula's goals culminate in one main aim: to improve the quality of life of children suffering from cancer.

- Create public awareness about the needs of children with cancer.
- Provide financial assistance to these children and their families.
- Create the most appropriate treatment environment and facilities.
- Support all other organizations and individuals that share the same goal.

== Achievements ==
- Lebanese American University Recognition Award, 2008.
- A Certificate of Appreciation from the Rafik Hariri University Hospital, for Toufoula's participation in the world health day 2010 health fair entitled "My Country, My City, My Health".
- A certificate of appreciation from the Garden Show & Spring Festival to Toufoula for participating at the Garden Show & Spring Festival 2010.
- A certificate of appreciation from Prime Minister Mr. Ziad Baroud for Toufoula for implementing the dream rooms at Hotel Dieu de France Hospital, 2010.
- Beirut International Marathon Recognition Award for 2008.
- A certificate of appreciation from FIKR Conference 9 for Toufoula for coming up with a new bright idea the "Dream Rooms", 2010.

== Fundraising for patient treatment ==
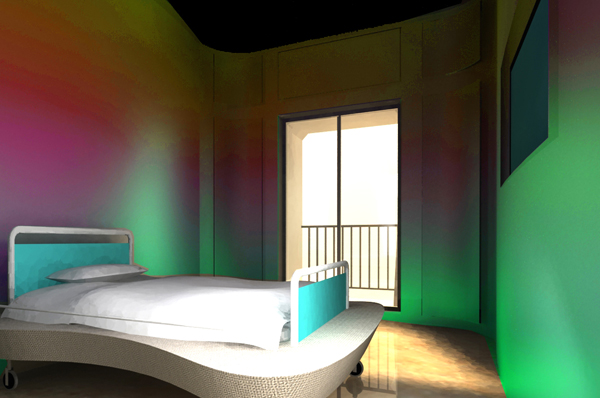
Sary El Khazen: A poetic and symbolic reinterpretation of the sky in a cloud shaped room that evokes reverie in an airy world of fantasy

Toufoula most importantly raises money to help in the treatment of the sick children

Years	Number of Patient	Amount
2007	7	$9,148
2008	2	$4,893
2009	19	$36,195
2010	11	$64,926
TOTAL	39	$115,162

== Events ==
Toufoula depends on fundraising activities and sponsors for its event. To fulfill their objectives several events were done:

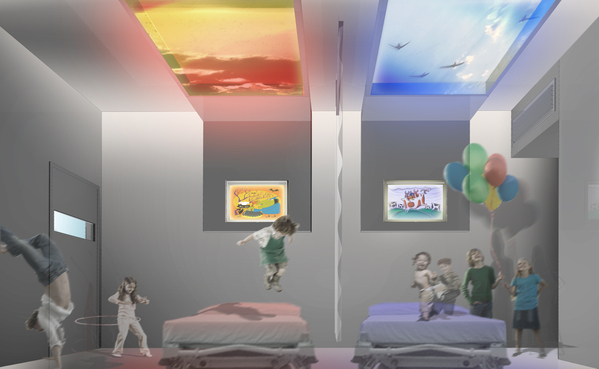
Bernard Khoury: L-shaped object fixed to the ceiling, a control system allows the children to change the colors of their portion of the sky according to their mood.

1. BIEL: Toufoula organized a carnival which took place from April 28, 2006, until May 1, 2006, at BIEL. 11,000 visitors came over three days; 200 sick children from all over Lebanon, along with their siblings, attended the event; 500 volunteers from various schools and universities across Lebanon helped make this event possible.
2. Marathon: Toufoula participated in the Beirut Marathon 2006 by wearing sewed butterfly wings (over 100) while running, winning Toufoula the Best costume for 2006's Marathon.
3. FIKR Conference: hosted by President Michel Sleiman was held at Phoenicia Hotel on December 8–9. Toufoula is selected as the only NGO from all Arab world to present their work at the conference. Mr. Maxime Chaya represented Toufoula, along with other Toufoula members, and patients who are directly supported by Toufoula's mission.
