= Hôpital de Purpan =

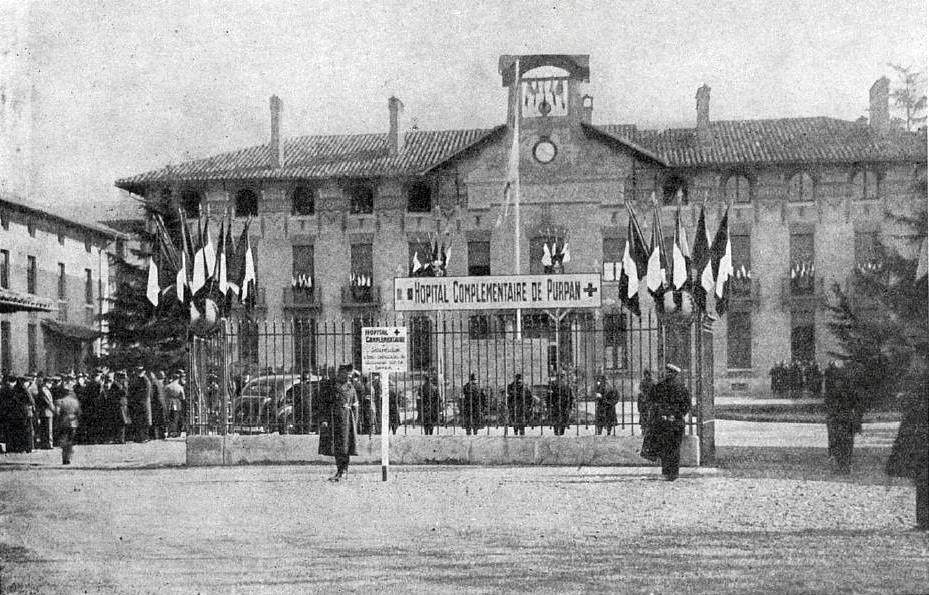
- Hôpital de Purpan in February 1940

Geography
- Location: Toulouse, Occitanie, France
- Coordinates: 43°36′33″N 1°24′03″E

Organisation
- Affiliated university: Toulouse III - Paul Sabatier University

Links
- Website: www.chu-toulouse.fr/-hopital-purpan-
- Lists: Hospitals in France

The Hôpital de Purpan (French pronunciation: [opital də pyʁpɑ̃]) is a public health establishment located in France in Toulouse Haute-Garonne district of Purpan. It is part of the Centre hospitalier universitaire de Toulouse.

== History ==
It was to replace the Hôtel-Dieu Saint-Jacques, deemed too small and dilapidated, that the creation of a new suburban hospital was decided in 1905 and it was not until September 25, 1911, that the first stone was laid in the presence of John Cruppi. Several pavilions were built, then requisitioned for the health service during the World War I.
