= Carlos Ghosn =

Fugitive, businessman, and former automotive executive (born 1954)

- كارلوس غصن
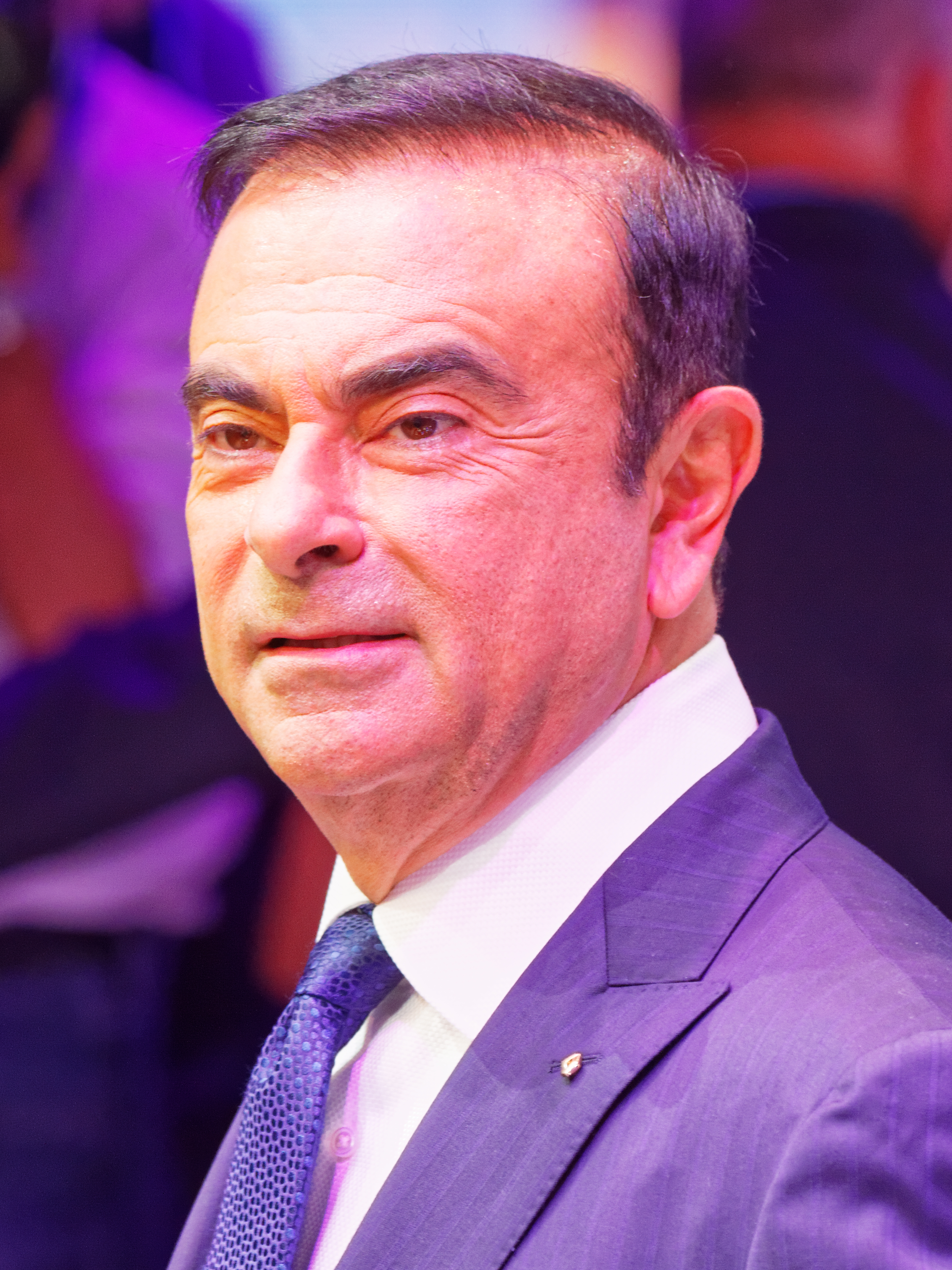
- Ghosn in 2014
- Born: 9 March 1954 (age 72); Porto Velho, Rondônia, Brazil
- Citizenship: Lebanon; France; Brazil
- Education: École Polytechnique (1974); École des mines (1978)
- Spouses: Rita Kordahi (m. 1984; div. 2012) Carole Nahas (m. 2016)
- Children: 4, including Caroline

Carlos Ghosn (/ɡoʊn/; French: [kaʁlɔs ɡon]; Arabic: كارلوس غصن, romanized: Kārlūs Ḡuṣn; Lebanese Arabic pronunciation: ['kaːrlos 'ɣosˤn], born 9 March 1954) is a businessman and former automotive executive. He was the chief executive officer (CEO) of Michelin North America, chairman and CEO of Renault, chairman of AvtoVAZ, chairman and CEO of Nissan, and chairman of Mitsubishi Motors.

Ghosn began his professional career in 1978 at Michelin, Europe's largest tire manufacturer. Over the course of 18 years at the company, he held a variety of leadership roles, including overseeing operations in South America. In 1999, following Renault's acquisition of a major stake in the struggling Japanese automaker Nissan, Ghosn moved to Japan to oversee its recovery. As chief operating officer, and later chief executive officer, he implemented a series of restructuring measures aimed at improving Nissan's financial performance. Under his leadership, Nissan returned to profitability and strengthened its position in the global market. In 2005, Ghosn also became CEO of Renault, holding top executive roles at both companies simultaneously. In 2016, he additionally became chairman of Mitsubishi Motors after Nissan acquired a controlling interest in the company, further expanding his influence in the automotive sector.

In 2018, he was arrested in Japan on suspicion of financial misconduct at Nissan, having been accused of understating his annual salary and misusing company funds. In 2019, while under house arrest awaiting trial, he escaped from Japan by concealing himself inside a large box, which was shipped as freight on a private jet.

== Early life and education ==
Ghosn's grandfather was Bichara Ghosn, a Maronite Catholic who emigrated from Ajaltoun, French Mandate Lebanon to Brazil at the age of 13, eventually settling in remote Guaporé, Rondônia, near the border between Brazil and Bolivia. Bichara Ghosn was an entrepreneur and eventually headed several companies, in businesses including the rubber trade, the sale and purchase of agricultural products, and aviation. His son Jorge Ghosn married Rose Jazzar, a Nigerian-born Lebanese woman whose family came from Miziara in Lebanon then went to Brazil, where they settled in Porto Velho, the state capital of Rondônia, and had four children.

Carlos' father, Jorge Ghosn (died 2006) was a diamond trader and worked in the airline industry. Jorge was convicted of murdering a priest in Sawfar, Lebanon in 1960. Jorge fled to Brazil in 1975 at the outbreak of the Lebanese Civil War.

Carlos Ghosn was born on 9 March 1954, in Porto Velho. When he was about two years old he became sick after drinking unsanitary water, and his mother moved with him to Rio de Janeiro. He did not fully recover there, and in 1960, when Ghosn was six years old, he and his mother and sister moved to Beirut, Lebanon, where his grandmother and two other sisters lived.

Ghosn completed his secondary school studies in Lebanon, at the Jesuit school Collège Notre-Dame de Jamhour. He then completed his classes préparatoires in Paris, at the Collège Stanislas and the Lycée Saint-Louis. He graduated as an engineer from the École Polytechnique in 1974 and the École des Mines de Paris in 1978.

== Career ==
=== Michelin ===
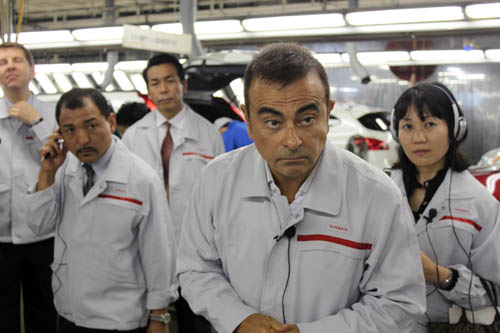
Carlos Ghosn answers reporters' questions at the Nissan factory in Kyushu, Japan (September 2011).

After graduation in 1978, Ghosn spent 18 years at Michelin, Europe's largest tyre maker, initially training and working in several plants in France and Germany. In 1981, he became plant manager in Le Puy-en-Velay, France. In 1984 he was named head of research and development for the company's industrial tyre division.

In 1985, when Ghosn was 30 years old, he was appointed chief operating officer (COO) of Michelin's South American operations. He returned to Rio de Janeiro, reporting directly to François Michelin, who tasked Ghosn with turning around the operation, which was unprofitable and struggling under Brazil's hyperinflation. Ghosn formed cross-functional management teams to determine best practices among the French, Brazilian, and other nationalities working in the South American division. The multicultural experience in Brazil formed the basis of his cross-cultural management style and emphasis on diversity as a core business asset. "You learn from diversity ... but you're comforted by commonality", Ghosn has said. The division returned to profitability in two years.

After turning around Michelin's South American operations, Ghosn was appointed president and COO of Michelin North America in 1989, and moved to Greenville, South Carolina, with his family. He was promoted to CEO of Michelin North America in 1990. He presided over the restructuring of the company after its acquisition of the Uniroyal Goodrich Tyre Company.

=== Post-privatisation Renault ===
In 1996, Ghosn became executive vice president in charge of purchasing, advanced research, engineering and development, powertrain operations, and manufacturing at Renault; and he was also in charge of Renault's South American division, located in the Mercosur. Ghosn's radical restructuring of Renault successfully contributed to profitability of the company over 1997. His reputation of successful performance under François Michelin was repeated under the first CEO of the freshly privatized Renault.

=== Nissan and the Renault–Nissan Alliance ===
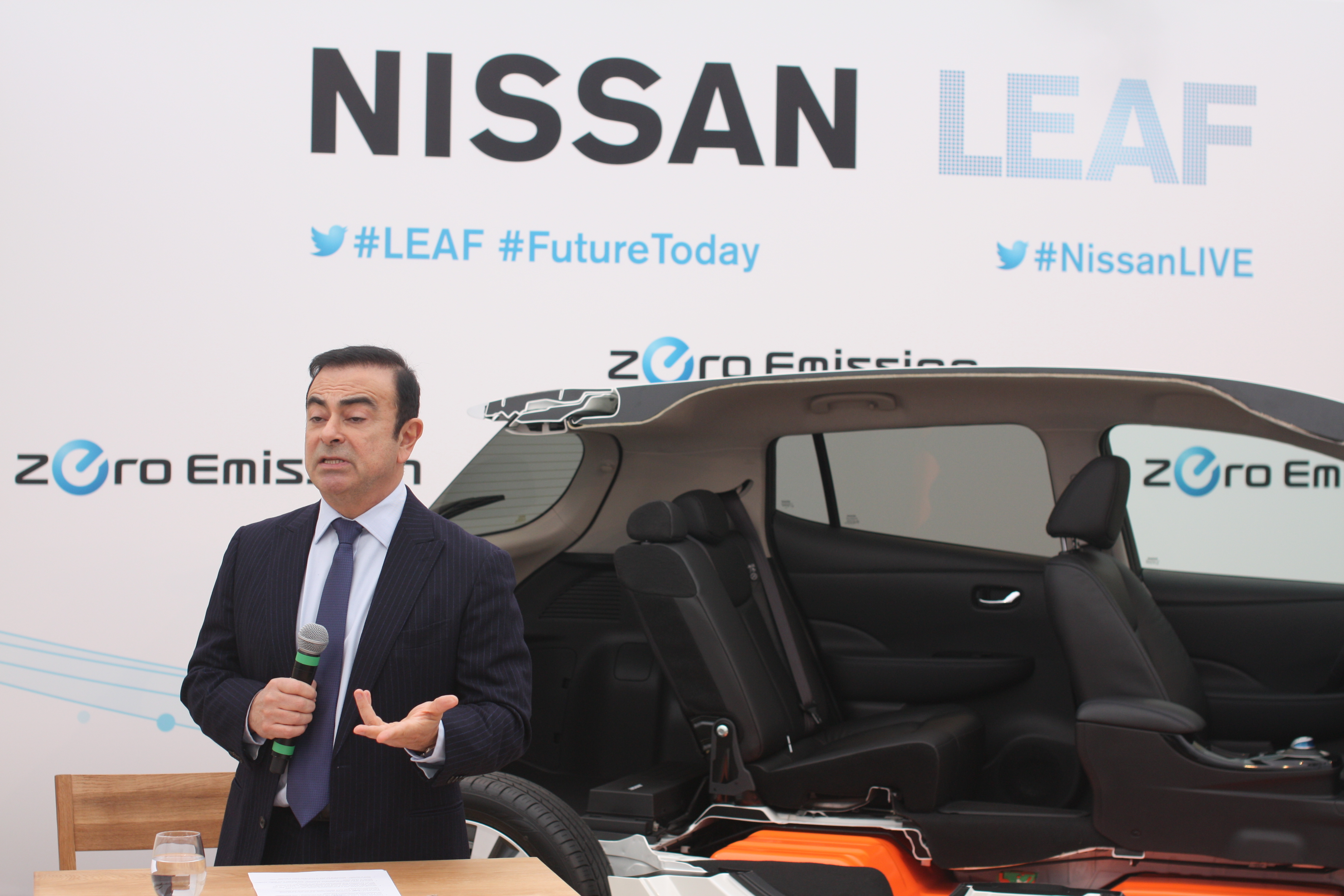
Nissan Renault CEO Carlos Ghosn visited Norway to launch the new Nissan LEAF (8 April 2013).

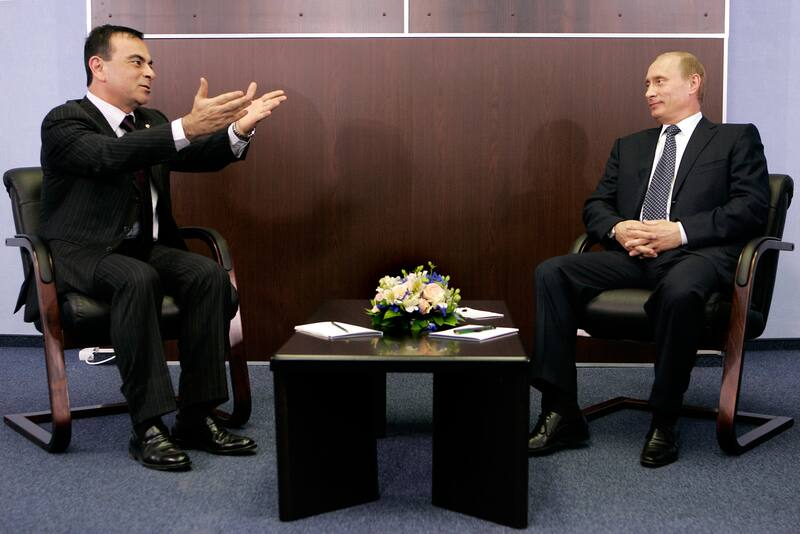
Ghosn with Vladimir Putin in 2006

In March 1999, Renault and Nissan formed the Renault–Nissan Alliance, and in May 1999 Renault purchased a 36.8% stake in Nissan. While maintaining his roles at Renault, Ghosn joined Nissan as its chief operating officer (COO) in June 1999, became its president in June 2000, and was named chief executive officer (CEO) in June 2001. When he joined the company, Nissan had a consolidated interest-bearing net automotive debt of more than $20 billion (more than 2 trillion yen), and only three of its 46 models sold in Japan were generating a profit. Reversing the company's sinking fortunes was considered nearly impossible.

Ghosn's "Nissan Revival Plan", announced in October 1999, called for a return to profitability in fiscal year 2000, a profit margin in excess of 4.5% of sales by the end of fiscal year 2002, and a 50% reduction in the current level of debt by the end of fiscal year 2002. Ghosn promised to resign if these goals were not met. Ghosn's Nissan Revival Plan called for cutting 21,000 Nissan jobs (14% of total workforce), mostly in Japan; shutting five Japanese plants; reducing the number of suppliers and shareholdings; and auctioning off prized assets such as Nissan's aerospace unit.

Ghosn was the fourth non-Japanese person to lead a Japanese automaker, after Mark Fields, Henry Wallace and James Miller were appointed by Ford to run Mazda in the late 1990s. In addition to cutting jobs, plants, and suppliers, Ghosn spearheaded major and dramatic structural and corporate-culture changes at Nissan. He defied Japanese business etiquette in various ways, including by eliminating seniority-based and age-based promotion, by changing lifetime employment from a guarantee to a desired goal for when the company achieved high performance, and by dismantling Nissan's keiretsu system; an interwoven web of parts suppliers with cross-holdings in Nissan. When the Nissan Revival Plan was announced, the proposed dismantling of keiretsu earned Ghosn the nickname "keiretsu killer", and The Wall Street Journal quoted a Dresdner Kleinwort Benson analyst in Tokyo as saying Ghosn might become a "target of public outrage" if Nissan threw former affiliates out of its supply chain. Ghosn changed Nissan's official company language from Japanese to English, and included executives from Europe and North America in key global strategy sessions for the first time.

In the first year of the Nissan Revival Plan, Nissan's consolidated net profit after tax climbed to $2.7 billion for fiscal year 2000, from a consolidated net loss of $6.46 billion in the previous year. Twelve months into his three-year turnaround plan, Nissan had returned to profitability, and within three years it was one of the industry's most profitable auto makers, with operating margins consistently above 9%; more than twice the industry average. The goals of the Nissan Revival Plan were all reached before 31 March 2002.

In May 2002, Ghosn announced his next set of goals for the company, "Nissan 180", a three-year plan for growth based on the numbers 1, 8, and 0: By the end of September 2005, Nissan planned to increase its global sales by one million vehicles; and by the spring of 2005, it was committed to achieving an operating margin of at least 8% and reducing its net automotive debt to zero. These goals were all reached: In the spring of 2003, Nissan announced that its net automotive debt was eliminated in fiscal year 2002. Nissan's operating profit margin climbed to 11.1% in fiscal year 2003; it had been 1.4% in fiscal year 1999. In October 2005, Nissan announced that its annual sales from 30 September 2004, to 30 September 2005, were more than 3.67 million, up from the 2.6 million vehicles sold in the fiscal year ended March 2002.

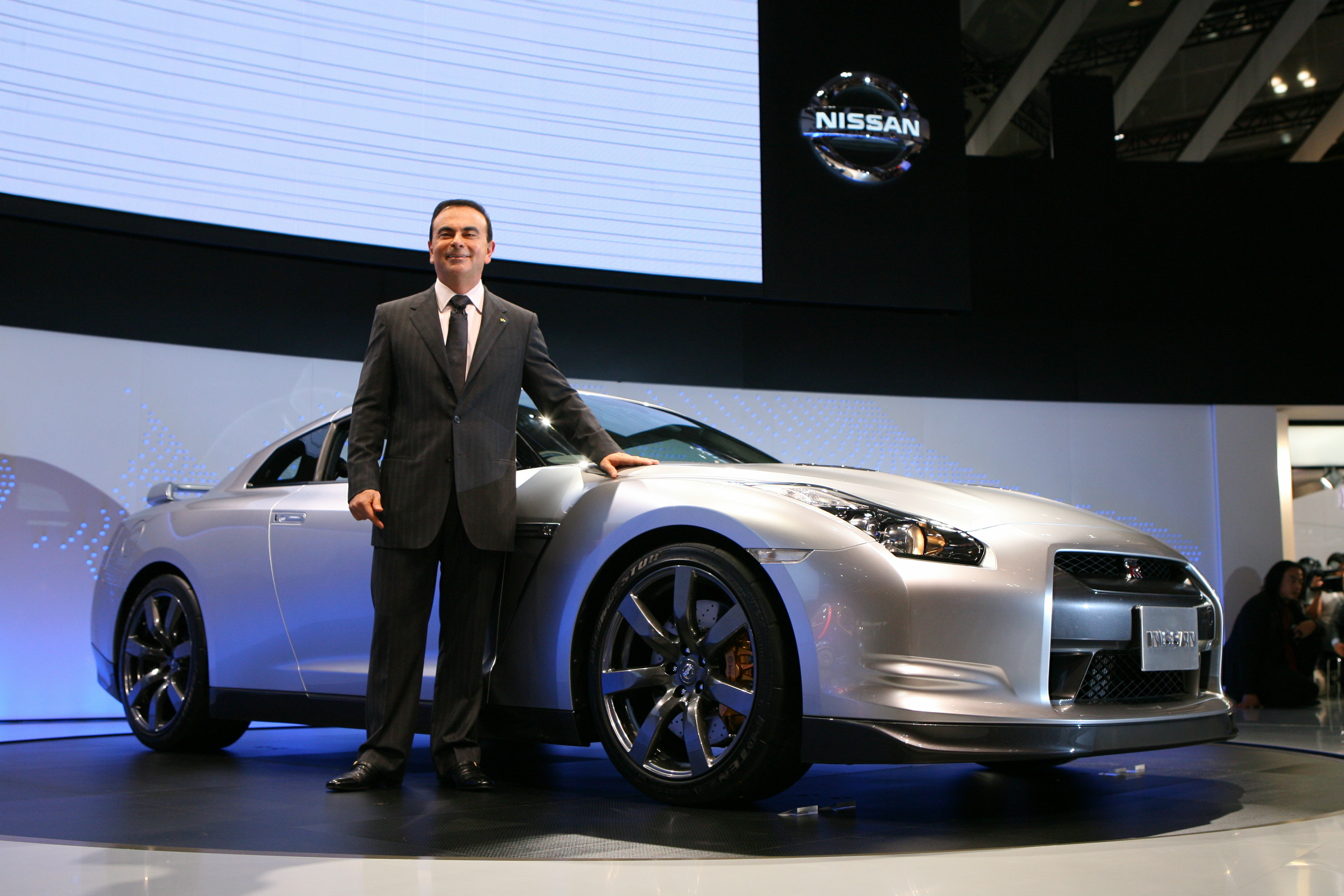
Carlos Ghosn unveiled the Nissan GT-R at the Tokyo Motor Show (2007).

In May 2005, Ghosn was named president and chief executive officer of Renault. When he assumed the CEO roles at both Renault and Nissan, Ghosn became the world's first person to simultaneously run two companies on the Fortune Global 500.

In 2005, billionaire investor Kirk Kerkorian acquired a 9.9% stake in General Motors (GM), seated one of his representatives on the company's board, and then urged GM to initiate a merger with Renault and Nissan, with Ghosn serving as the new chairman of GM. In 2006, GM's embattled management rebuffed the takeover attempt, and by the end of the year, Kerkorian's Tracinda Corp. sold most of its GM stock.

In 2006, Ford Motor Co. made Ghosn a formal offer to lead the company. Ghosn refused, reportedly saying the only way he would come to the struggling company was if he was named both the CEO and chairman of the board. Bill Ford Jr. refused to give up his chairmanship.

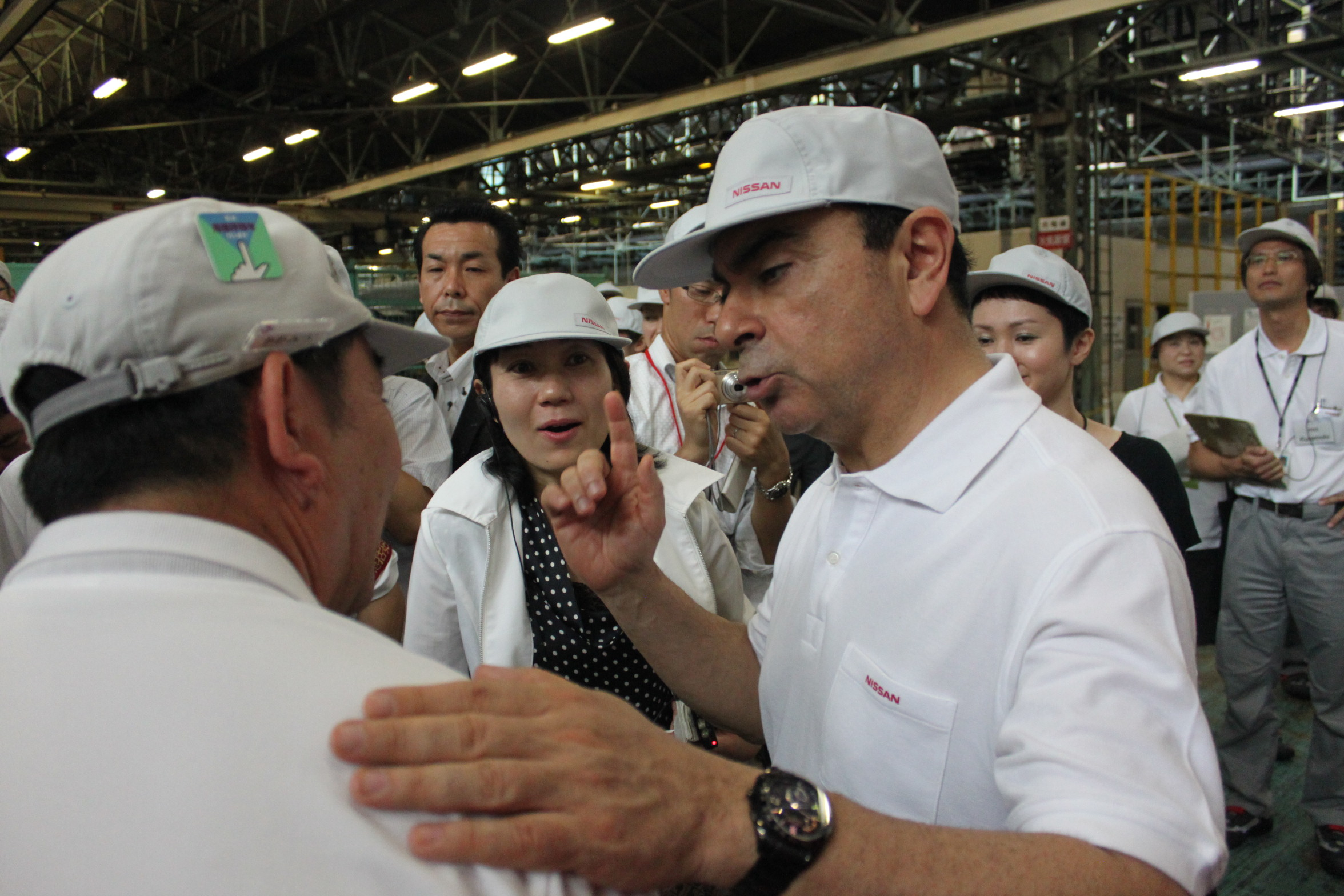
Carlos Ghosn at Nissan's Honmoku Wharf, a logistics hub about 10 km southeast of Nissan's global headquarters in Yokohama, July 2011

In 2007, Ghosn led the Renault–Nissan Alliance into the mass-market zero-emission electric car market in a major way, and committed €4 billion (more than $5 billion) to the effort. In 2008, he confirmed that Nissan–Renault would bring an "entire lineup" of zero-emission electric cars to the worldwide market by 2012. In 2009, he told the University of Pennsylvania's Wharton School of Business, "If you're going to let developing countries have as many cars as they want—and they're going to have as many cars as they want one way or another—there is absolutely no alternative but to go for zero emissions. And the only zero-emissions vehicle available today is electric ... So we decided to go for it." The Nissan Leaf, an electric car billed as "the world's first affordable zero-emission car", debuted in December 2010. By 2017, the Renault–Nissan Alliance was the world leader in electric vehicles, selling more than twice as many electric cars as Tesla, and the Nissan Leaf was the world's best-selling electric vehicle by a wide margin.

Ghosn was a visible leader in recovery efforts after the Japanese earthquake and tsunami on 11 March 2011, one of the worst natural disasters in modern history. On 29 March 2011, he made the first of several visits to the hard-hit Iwaki engine plant in Fukushima prefecture, 50 km (31 miles) from the Fukushima Daiichi nuclear power plant, and at his direction Nissan restored full operations at the Iwaki factory well ahead of expectations. He appeared on television in Japan to encourage optimism. In May 2011, Ghosn remained committed to building at least 1 million of Nissan's cars and trucks in Japan annually. In 2011 Ghosn was under scrutiny by the French government for mishandling a spying scandal related to Renault.

In June 2012, Ghosn was named deputy chairman of the board of directors of Russian automobile manufacturer AvtoVAZ. In June 2013, he was appointed chairman of the Russian company, a position he retained through June 2016. Renault had begun a strategic partnership with AvtoVAZ in 2008 by acquiring a 25% stake in the company; this led to increasingly deeper partnerships between Renault–Nissan and AvtoVAZ, ending in Renault–Nissan Alliance control of the Russian automaker in 2014.

In February 2017, Ghosn announced he would step down as CEO of Nissan on 1 April 2017, while remaining chairman of the company. Hiroto Saikawa, succeeded Ghosn at Nissan. In November 2018, Renault owned 43.4% of Nissan, while Nissan owned non-voting shares equal to 15% of Renault's equity.

=== Mitsubishi ===
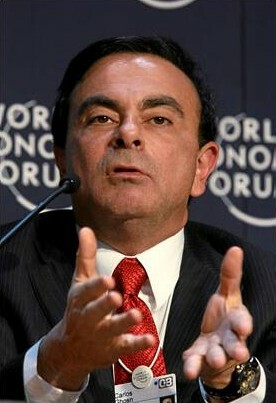
Carlos Ghosn at the Annual Meeting of the World Economic Forum in Davos (2008)

In October 2016, Nissan completed the acquisition of a controlling 34% stake in Mitsubishi Motors. Ghosn became, in addition to his Renault–Nissan posts, chairman of Mitsubishi, with an aim to rehabilitate the automaker after a months-long scandal involving fuel-economy misrepresentation and consequent falling revenues. The Nissan–Mitsubishi partnership includes partnership in developing electric automobiles for Mitsubishi, and the Renault–Nissan–Mitsubishi Alliance creates the world's fourth-largest auto group, after Toyota, Volkswagen AG, and General Motors Co.

Mitsubishi Motors board removed Ghosn from his role as chairman on 26 November 2018, following his arrest and ousting from Nissan for alleged financial misconduct.

=== Advisorships ===
Ghosn served on the International Advisory Board of Brazilian bank Banco Itaú (a major party in the privatisation of Renault) until 2015. He is also a member of the advisory board of Tsinghua University School of Economics and Management in Beijing. He has received an honorary doctorate from American University of Beirut; and he is a member of the Strategic Council, Saint Joseph University of Beirut. In 2014 and 2015, he was elected president of the European Automobile Manufacturers Association. He serves as governor of the World Economic Forum.

== Legal troubles ==
=== Initial arrest ===
On 19 November 2018, Tokyo district prosecutors arrested Ghosn at 4:30 p.m. upon his re-entry into Japan aboard a private jet that had come from Lebanon, for questioning over allegations of false accounting. Ghosn's top aide, Greg Kelly, a Nissan director and former head of human resources, was also arrested upon his arrival from the U.S. that day.

On the same day, Nissan chief executive Hiroto Saikawa announced at a press conference that Ghosn had been dismissed from Nissan's board and would be stripped of executive rights at a meeting to be held on 22 November. Saikawa stressed that the dismissal was the result of an internal inquiry by Nissan, and alleged that Ghosn and Kelly had under-reported their compensation (a violation of securities law) and used company assets for personal use. While the allegations remained unproven in court, with due legal process pending, at the same news conference, Saikawa "expressed disappointment, indignation, and despair at Ghosn's conduct, which included using company funds for personal investments and misusing corporate assets" and also said, "This is an act that cannot be tolerated by the company... It is sufficient grounds for his dismissal."

Although the company did not provide details, reports in the Japanese media stated that Nissan was paying all or some of the costs at some amount of US$18 million for residences used by Ghosn in Rio de Janeiro, Beirut, Paris and Amsterdam, and that Ghosn charged family vacation expenses to the company. The purchases of some of these residences and the payment of expenses were handled by a shell company named Zi-A Capital BV based in the Netherlands, which Kelly had instructed Nissan's board to set up to make venture investments at the end of 2010 (around the same time as Ghosn's divorce from his first wife and beginning of a relationship with his second wife). Nissan funds were used to purchase Ghosn's Paris apartment in 2005, and Zi-A funds were used to purchase his $5 million beachfront Rio apartment in 2012 and his Beirut mansion, which, with renovations, cost over $15 million. Nissan compliance auditors began trying to track Zi-A activity in 2014 but were stymied at first by the chain of shell companies used in Zi-A investments.

In addition, to avoid reporting the full amount of his compensation in Nissan financials, as required by Japanese law beginning in 2010, Ghosn had Kelly structure complicated deferred payment plans which went unreported under an aggressive interpretation of the disclosure rules which Nissan's outside auditors had not signed off on, and which totaled around $80 million at the time of his arrest eight years later. According to Nikkei reports, Ghosn told investigators that he instructed Kelly to handle the compensation reporting in a legal manner, and Kelly told investigators that he acted on advice from outside law firms and the Financial Services Agency in handling the reporting. Leaks to the media said that Ghosn had planned to call a vote to fire Nissan CEO Saikawa and reinstate Kelly (who had semi-retired to the U.S. in 2015) to active service at the scheduled board meeting.

Ghosn was detained at the Tokyo Detention House, under Japanese rules that allow suspects to be detained for up to 23 days without criminal charges being filed. Ghosn and Kelly were reportedly arrested on information provided by an unidentified non-Japanese executive in Nissan's legal department, in the second deal ever struck under Japan's newly introduced plea bargaining system. Charges were filed against Ghosn and Kelly on the underreporting of deferred compensation on 10 December, along with allegations of additional charges that restarted a 10-day holding period without bail. Nissan also took control of the Rio and Beirut properties and changed the locks, which has led Ghosn's family to sue for access.

=== Continued detention and new charges ===
On 21 December 2018, Ghosn was re-arrested on suspicion of shifting to Nissan personal losses of US$16.6 million related to a personal swap contract in October 2008 (during the global financial crisis). The introduction of those charges prevented Ghosn's release on bail later the same day, because the new charges permitted an additional 10–20 days of incarceration prior to a bail hearing. Subsequent reporting linked this charge to Ghosn's dealings with Sheikh Khaled al-Juffali, the vice chairman of one of Saudi Arabia's largest conglomerates and majority owner of a company which owns half of a regional joint venture called Nissan Gulf, with the other half held by a wholly owned Nissan subsidiary. In return for a personal letter of credit from Juffali to Ghosn during the 2008 crisis, which served as bank-demanded collateral for Ghosn's swap contract, Nissan indirectly paid $14.7 million from an internal discretionary fund known as the "CEO Reserve" to a wholly owned Juffali company in four installments between 2009 and 2012, although the internal documentation did not specify the ultimate recipient. According to Tokyo prosecutors, Kelly was not involved in this transaction and so was released on bail on 25 December.

Ghosn made his first public appearance after his arrest at an arraignment on Tuesday, 8 January 2019, where he asserted his innocence, making a statement in response to the main allegations against him; however, his bid to be released from prison on these charges was rejected.

Ghosn's imprisonment was set to end on 11 January 2019. That day, Ghosn was indicted on two additional charges: aggravated breach of trust and understating his income, once again extending his imprisonment. As a result, he could remain in jail for months more before a trial would take place. Two days later, Nissan's investigation allegedly found that, in addition to the underreporting of salary already charged, Ghosn had paid himself an undisclosed $8 million in 2018 from a Netherlands-based joint venture owned by Nissan and Mitsubishi that was set up in 2017, without the knowledge of either company's directors because Ghosn had the sole authority to dispense cash from the venture.

Ghosn again appealed the denial of bail from 8 January 2019 and offered to meet greater restrictions and higher guarantees of appearance in return for his release, including wearing an ankle bracelet and posting his Nissan stock as collateral. Additionally, on 14 January 2019 Ghosn's wife Carole published a letter that she wrote to Human Rights Watch protesting against his treatment in detainment. Nevertheless, on 21 January 2019, the Tokyo district court again denied bail.

The Japanese term hitojichi shihō ("hostage justice") has been brought up in some media reports. Takashi Takano, one of Ghosn's lawyers stated that the Japanese judicial system is a country risk.

=== Further developments ===
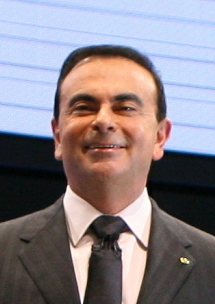
Carlos Ghosn (2007)

On 11 January 2019 José Muñoz, Nissan's chief performance officer and head of its China operations, resigned from the company. Muñoz, considered to be a close ally to Ghosn and a possible successor as CEO of Renault and Nissan, had been a "person of interest" in Nissan's internal investigation, with which he was reported to be uncooperative. One of Nissan's three independent directors opined that Nissan may simply eliminate the position of chairman and not replace Ghosn, a route previously taken by other scandal-plagued Japanese companies. The Reuters Japan news service reported that Nissan may file suit against Ghosn personally.

At first the French government and Renault had been reported to be standing behind Ghosn during his imprisonment, on the presumption that Ghosn is innocent until proven guilty. However, France's financial minister Bruno Le Maire stated on 16 January that Renault may seek a new CEO to replace Ghosn due to his continued incarceration. Renault possibly worried about Nissan taking the chance to use the power vacuum at Renault to reshape the alliance's balance of power. After the French government called for leadership change and his bail requests were rejected by the Japanese courts, Ghosn finally agreed to step down. He resigned as chairman and CEO of Renault on 24 January 2019.

On 30 January 2019, Ghosn said the charges were "plot and treason" by executives at Nissan who opposed the relationship with Renault and a future plan that was in the works to integrate Nissan, Mitsubishi and Renault. In mid-February 2019, Ghosn's lead counsel Motonari Otsuru stepped down and was replaced by Jun'ichirō Hironaka, who has a record of success in a number of high-profile cases.

==== Bail ====
In early March 2019, Ghosn was granted a request for bail in a Tokyo court. This was his third bail request, and the first by his new legal team under Hironaka. The court set bail at 1 billion yen (about US$9 million) subject to stringent conditions. He was not allowed to travel abroad, and had to remain at a given address under 24-hour camera surveillance, with no internet access. He was released on 6 March 2019.

On 3 April 2019, Ghosn tweeted that he was "ready to tell the truth" and that he would hold a conference on 11 April 2019. He was re-arrested for the fourth time early on 4 April 2019 over new suspicions of financial misconduct concerning alleged dealings via Oman. Ghosn released a statement claiming the arrest was "outrageous and arbitrary". Until that point in time he had been held for 108 days since he was first arrested in November 2018.

On 8 April 2019, during an extraordinary shareholders' meeting, Nissan shareholders voted to remove Ghosn from the company board. Shareholders also voted to remove Ghosn's former right-hand man Greg Kelly, and to appoint Renault chairman Jean-Dominique Senard as a director. The next day, Ghosn posted a YouTube video, where he publicly stated that he was "innocent of all the accusations that came around these charges that are all biased, taken out of context, twisted in a way to paint a personage of greed, and a personage of dictatorship". He also claimed that the payments to Juffali were meant to help Nissan fix a dispute with a local distributor, and to open a bank contract to convert his salary from yen to US dollars, in order to avoid currency swings.

The Japanese court rejected an appeal filed by Ghosn's lawyers, and approved an initial 10 days detention for Ghosn, until 22 April 2019. He was released in late April, but confined to strict house arrest, including having no contact with his wife for four months.

==== Investigations in other countries ====
In June 2019, Renault published that in an internal audit they had uncovered 11 million euros in questionable expenses by Ghosn, which was followed by the French state opening its own investigation into his actions. Prosecutors in the district of Nanterre west of Paris stated that anti-fraud police had searched his residence in the town of L'Étang-la-Ville for evidence. In July Renault's headquarters in Boulogne-Billancourt were searched by 20 police personnel in relation to this case.

In August 2019, his wife Carole appealed to President Emmanuel Macron of France to intercede on behalf of her husband with Japanese leader Shinzo Abe at the 45th G7 summit held from 24 to 26 August at the French town of Biarritz.

In September 2019, in one of the first legal accords of the saga, Ghosn settled with the U.S. Securities and Exchange Commission over claims of failing to disclose more than $140 million in pay to him from Nissan. He was fined $1 million while Nissan was fined $15 million and Greg Kelly $100,000. Although he neither admitted nor denied the SEC's charges, he accepted a ten-year ban from serving as an officer or director of a public company. Kelly accepted a five-year ban under similar terms. According to The New York Times, the settlement all but ended Ghosn's career as a global business executive.

=== Flight from Japan ===
On 30 December 2019, numerous media outlets reported that Ghosn had escaped from Japan and arrived in Beirut, Lebanon. Ghosn later confirmed these reports through a statement released by his press representative in New York. In his statement, Ghosn claimed that he would "no longer be held hostage by a rigged Japanese justice system where guilt is presumed, discrimination is rampant and basic human rights are denied."

Ghosn left his Tokyo apartment at around 14:30 on 29 December 2019 and joined two men at a nearby hotel. The three then took a bullet train from Shinagawa to Osaka and arrived at a hotel near Kansai International Airport just after 20:00. The team hired to extract him from Tokyo had noticed that Japanese security did not follow Ghosn into hotels, which facilitated his escape. A few hours later, two men left the hotel carrying large containers, including an audio equipment box where Ghosn was hidden. The men then boarded a Bombardier Global Express private jet with Turkish registration TC-TSR. The large box carrying Ghosn was never x-rayed or checked by customs officials, because it was too big to fit inside the x-ray machine; the plane left Kansai Airport at 23:10, landing at Istanbul Atatürk Airport at 5:26 on the morning of 30 December 2019. Within an hour of the plane's landing, a separate private jet left for Beirut. An employee at Turkish private jet operator MNG Jet admitted to falsifying passenger records, in which two separate planes were leased, one from Dubai to Osaka and then Osaka to Istanbul, the other from Istanbul to Beirut.

The Lebanese Ambassador to Japan, Nidal Yehya, denied the involvement of the Embassy of Lebanon in Ghosn's escape, but "always stressed to him that he must abide by all the conditions of his release, as decided by the Criminal Court in Tokyo".

=== Residence in Lebanon ===
Following Ghosn's arrival in Lebanon, a Tokyo court granted a request by Japanese prosecutors to revoke his bail. While Japan and Lebanon are both members of Interpol and have had diplomatic relations since 1954, there is no extradition agreement between the two countries. Interpol has issued a red notice for his arrest. Japanese authorities raided Ghosn's Tokyo apartment on 2 January 2020 looking for evidence.

Ghosn later addressed reports that his family, including his wife Carole, may have played a role in his departure from Japan, stating that "such speculation is inaccurate and false." On 7 January 2020, prosecutors in Japan issued an arrest warrant for Carole Ghosn on suspicion of giving false testimony during a court hearing in April 2019.

Carlos Ghosn held his first press conference since leaving Japan on 8 January 2020, in which he described his imprisonment conditions, pleaded innocence, and named Nissan executives who plotted his demise. He claimed that when he left Japan, "I fled injustice and political persecution." The next day, Judge Ghassan Ouiedat, a Lebanese prosecutor, imposed a travel ban on Ghosn. After he escaped from Japan, Carlos Ghosn's Japanese lawyer and seven other members of his defense resigned. His lawyer, Junichiro Hironaka, said his escape was a "complete surprise".

On 10 February 2020, Ghosn hired former Disney president Michael Ovitz, co-founder of the Creative Artists Agency, as his Hollywood agent. On 12 February 2020, Nissan launched a $90 million lawsuit against Ghosn for alleged "corrupt" actions, and on 29 February 2020, Japan's financial regulators fined Nissan 2.42 billion yen ($22 million) for underreporting remuneration of former Chairman Ghosn and other executives for years. On 8 July 2020, The Nikkei reported that $862,500 was paid from a Paris bank account related to Ghosn to Promote Fox, a company managed by Michael Taylor, an ex-Green Beret who helped him flee to Lebanon.

Ghosn's house in Lebanon sustained damage following the August 2020 Beirut explosion, which occurred 5 kilometers (3 miles) away from the residence.

On 3 November 2020, Lebanon's prosecutor general decided not to charge Ghosn for visiting Israel in 2008 because the statute of limitations had expired. Previously, some Lebanese lawyers wanted Ghosn prosecuted over his 2008 trip to Israel as the chairman of Renault-Nissan to meet Better Place founder Shai Agassi, which they claim violated the Arab League boycott of Israel. Also in the same month Nissan fired its global general counsel Ravinder Passi, who claimed to have whistle-blown improper handling of the Ghosn case inside Nissan.

On 23 November 2020, a panel of human rights experts working with the United Nations concluded that Ghosn's arrest and detention in Japan were "fundamentally unfair". The Working Group on Arbitrary Detention also stated that the Japanese government should give Ghosn "compensation" and "other reparations" due to the arrest and detention conditions in November 2018. Despite the fact that the Nelson Mandela Rules set a 15-day limit on how long prisoners can be kept in isolation, Kelly was held in solitary confinement for 37 days before he was granted bail, and Ghosn for 108 days. The Taylors were in solitary confinement for more than 100 days each. "The Carlos Ghosn case, including Greg Kelly and the Taylors, is an aberration," said William Cleary, an expert on Japanese law with a doctorate in criminal procedure.

In December 2020, it was reported that French investigators would meet with Ghosn in January 2021 as part of a separate investigation of expenses covered by a Dutch subsidiary of Renault and Nissan. Ghosn is under two investigations in France, one that is focused on suspicious transactions between Renault and a distributor in Oman, as well as another investigation into alleged illegal payments for private trips and events paid by Renault-Nissan's Netherlands-based holding company, RNBV. In a January 2021 interview, Ghosn questioned why France was questioning him over the charges, while Japan did not, and denied the charges.

In February 2024, four senior Nissan workers were charged with stealing documents, files, and electronic devices from Ghosn's Beirut home and office.

=== Prosecution and conviction of facilitators of his escape from Japan ===
Arrest warrants issued by Japanese prosecutors on 30 January 2020 claimed that the escape operation was orchestrated by former United States Army Special Forces soldier Michael Taylor, a private-security contractor with extensive contacts in Lebanon. The warrants also claimed that Taylor was assisted by his son Peter Maxwell Taylor and a third American, George Antoine Zayek. Michael Taylor had conducted similar international rescue operations in the past.

On 8 May, Turkey charged seven people accused of helping Ghosn flee to Lebanon via Istanbul. On 20 May, United States authorities arrested Michael and Peter Taylor on suspicion of helping Ghosn escape. On 30 October 2020, the US agreed to extradite the Taylors to Japan.

In June 2021, Michael Taylor and his son Peter pleaded guilty in Tokyo to helping Ghosn escape from Japan in December 2019. The Taylors later expressed their regret and apologized to the Japanese. It was revealed that Ghosn paid the Taylors more than $1 million for their services, via bank transfers and cryptocurrency.

In July 2021, the Taylors were convicted and sentenced in Japan for aiding Ghosn. Michael was sentenced to two years' imprisonment, while his son received a sentence of 20 months. In October 2022, the two were transferred to the United States by the Federal Bureau of Prisons after the two governments agreed to allow the Taylors to serve out the remainder of their sentences in the United States.

=== Further prosecutions ===
In April 2022, France issued an international warrant for Ghosn's arrest, in addition to four other individuals who administrated the Omani company Suhail Bahwan Automobiles, in which the latter had allegedly helped Ghosn to funnel millions of dollars of Renault funds through them for his personal use, including the purchase of a 120-foot (37 m) yacht. Ghosn said the timing of this warrant was "suspicious" and later mentioned that he wanted to stand trial on charges of financial wrongdoing to clear his name.

In October 2023, a Lebanese court ruled that Ghosn and his wife must vacate his residence, valued at $19 million, in Achrafieh, Beirut within a month. The decision was taken four years after Phoinos Investment accused him of "violation of private property" and residing there without legal basis. Ghosn appealed the verdict, claiming that the company was affiliated with Nissan, and that the property was purchased according to a signed agreement with the latter which granted him the right to live there. The eviction order was halted until the lawsuit with Phoinos was concluded in December 2023.

== Personal life ==
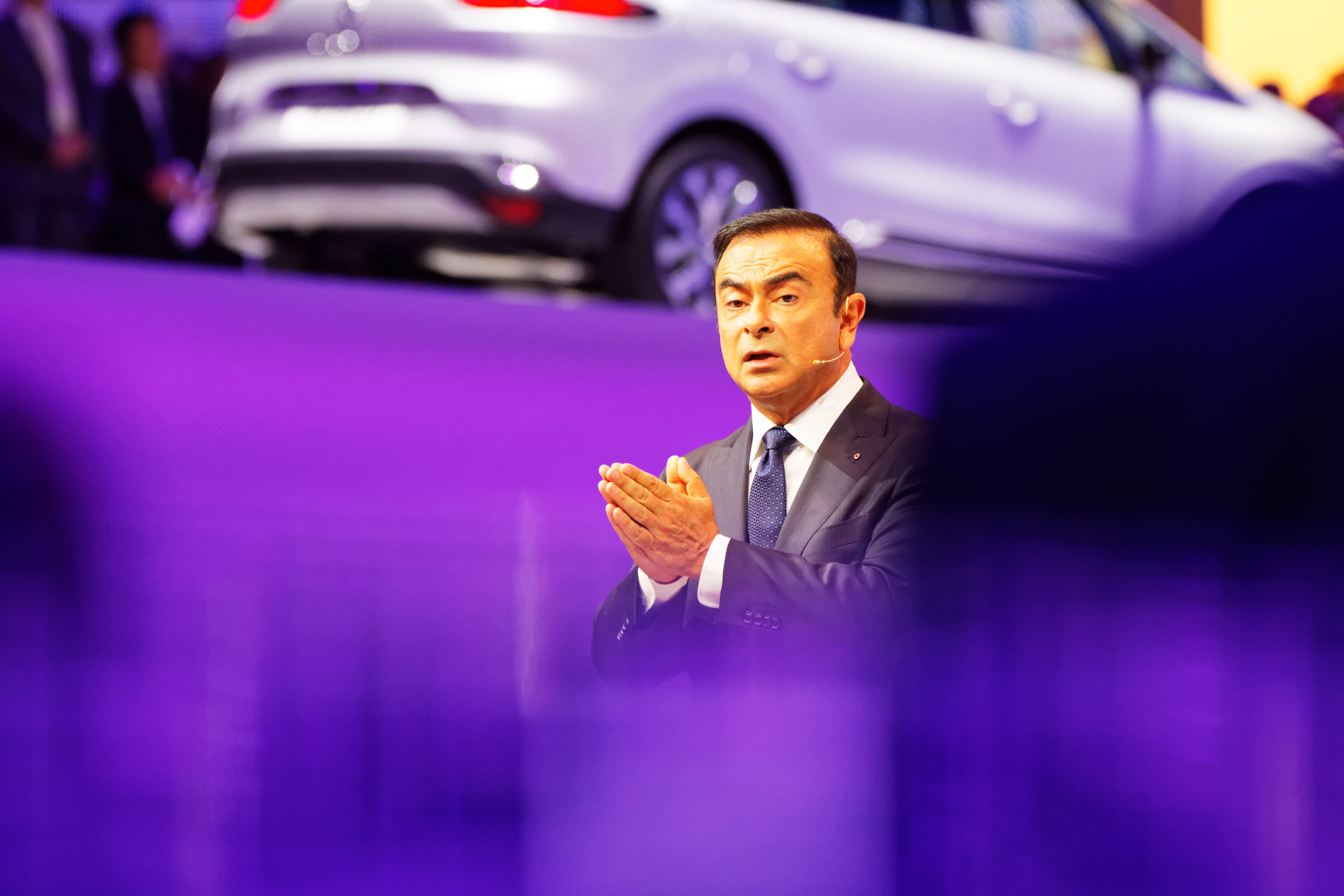
Carlos Ghosn at 2014 Paris Motor Show

Ghosn's first marriage was to Rita Kordahi, who came originally from Rayfoun, Lebanon, and whom he met in France in 1984. Together they had four children: Caroline, Nadine, Maya and Anthony. They divorced in 2012. In May 2016, Ghosn married Lebanese-American Carole Nahas, and a few months later in October, threw a large party at the Grand Trianon in Versailles to celebrate both the wedding and Carole's 50th birthday. He is reported by several Japanese media to have six private residences: in Tokyo, Paris, Rio de Janeiro, Amsterdam, Beirut, and New York.

Ghosn, whom Forbes magazine called "the hardest-working man in the brutally competitive global car business", as of 2006 was splitting his time between Paris and Tokyo and logging roughly 150,000 nautical miles (280,000 km; 170,000 mi) in airplanes per year. Japanese media called him "Seven-Eleven" ("work very hard from early in the morning till late at night"). He holds citizenship to Lebanon, Brazil and France. He has been noted for his direct, results-and-execution-oriented style in business strategy meetings, and for his interest in resolving problems from within a company by listening to workers and by cross-functional and cross-cultural team groupings.

Ghosn is multilingual, speaking four languages fluently – Arabic, English, French, and Portuguese – and he has also studied Japanese. He is a partner in Ixsir, a winery in the northern coastal town of Batroun, Lebanon. In 2012, he was named to the Honorary Board of the American Foundation of Saint George Hospital in Beirut. In 2020, he became a coach to business leaders at USEK.

Ghosn was hailed as a potential presidential candidate in Lebanon in 2007. In a June 2011 survey by life-insurance company Axa, Ghosn was ranked No. 7 in a random poll asking Japanese people, "Which celebrity do you want to run Japan?" (Barack Obama was No. 9, and Prime Minister Naoto Kan was No. 19.) He has so far declined such overtures, saying he has "no political ambitions".

Ghosn's lawyers have stated he has chronic kidney disease which they claim was worsened by his lack of access to proper treatment while imprisoned.

=== In the media ===
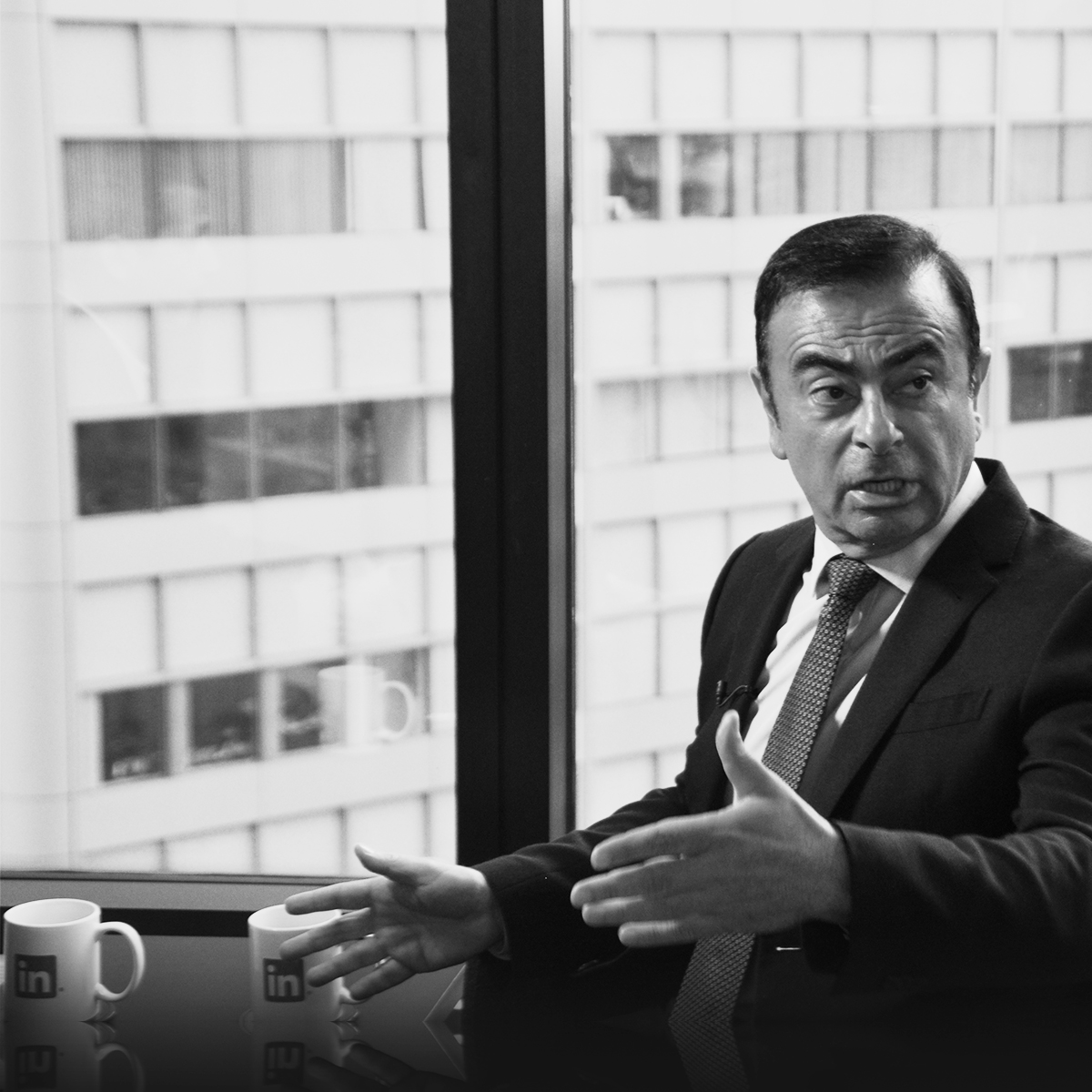
Carlos Ghosn interviewed by LinkedIn Influencer (2014)

Beginning in November 2001, Ghosn's life story was turned into a superhero comic book series in Japan, titled The True Story of Carlos Ghosn, in the manga comic book Big Comic Superior. The series was published as a book in 2002. His face has been reproduced both in Lebanese postage stamps and in bento boxes in Japanese restaurants.

Ghosn is the subject of a number of books in English, Japanese, and French. In English, he wrote a bestselling business book called Shift: Inside Nissan's Historic Revival. He was the subject of another business book called Turnaround: How Carlos Ghosn Rescued Nissan by David Magee. He also provided strategic business commentary and on-the-job lessons to aspiring managers in a book called The Ghosn Factor: 24 Inspiring Lessons From Carlos Ghosn, the Most Successful Transnational CEO by Miguel Rivas-Micoud.

Netflix in 2022 released a documentary titled Fugitive: The Curious Case of Carlos Ghosn, which chronicles Ghosn's rise, as well as the internal rivalries and tensions he sparked within Nissan-Renault, and his dramatic arrest. Apple TV+ released a documentary titled Wanted: The Escape of Carlos Ghosn, in 2023.

In 2025, Ghosn gave an interview to Al Arabiya, in which when asked about Hezbollah's decline, he said: "As a party, [they're] certainly not [over]. I think they represent a portion of the population, and in any democracy they should be playing the role."

== Awards and recognition ==
As a result of his achievements, Ghosn has had numerous awards and honors bestowed upon him. Some of these include:

- In 2001, he topped TIME magazine's list of Global Influentials, beating Bill Gates and several other globally renowned businessmen.
- In 2001, he was named Father of the Year by a Japanese community group.
- In 2002, he was appointed a Chevalier of the Legion of Honour (Knight of the Legion of Honour) by the French government.
- In 2002 Fortune awarded him Asia Businessman of the Year.
- In 2003, he was named Man of the Year by Fortune magazine's Asian edition.
- In 2003 Fortune listed him as one of the 10 most powerful business leaders outside the U.S.
- In 2004, he became the first foreign business leader to receive the prestigious Blue Ribbon Medal from Emperor Akihito of Japan.
- In 2004, he was added to the Automotive Hall of Fame.
- In 2004, he was also added to the Japan Automotive Hall of Fame.
- In 2006, Ghosn was made an Honorary Knight Commander of the Order of the British Empire.
- In 2010, CEO Quarterly magazine listed Ghosn as one of the "Most Respected CEOs".
- In 2010, he was appointed as the jury member of the Takreem Award Committee between 2010 and 2018.
- In 2011, CNBC listed Ghosn as Asia Business Leader of the Year.
- In 2012, Ghosn was awarded the Grand Cordon of the Order of Ouissam Alaouite, an honorific designation to civilians in recognition of services that benefit Morocco.
- In 2012, Ghosn received the Japan Society Award.
- In 2012, Ghosn became the first person in the auto industry, and the fourth overall, to win a Lifetime Achievement Award from the Strategic Management Society, a non-profit group that promotes ethical and strategic business stewardship.
- In 2012, Ghosn was awarded the Grand Cross of the Order of Isabella the Catholic, an honorific designation to civilians in recognition of services that benefit Spain.
- In 2013, he was appointed an International Fellow of the Royal Academy of Engineering.
- In 2017, Lebanon's national post office, LibanPost, unveiled a collectable stamp honoring Carlos Ghosn.

== Bibliography ==
=== Books ===
- Ghosn, Carlos (2001). Renaissance. Translated by Nakagawa, Haruko. Tokyo: Diamond.
- ——————; Riès, Philippe (2003). Citoyen du monde (in French). Grasset. ISBN 978-2-246-63091-3.
- —————— (2007). SHIFT: Inside Nissan's Historic Revival. Crown Publishing Group. ISBN 9780307423818.
- ——————; Riès, Philippe (2020). Le temps de la vérité (in French). Bernard Grasset. ISBN 978-2-246-82417-6.
- ——————; Riès, Philippe (2021). Broken Alliances: Inside the Rise and Fall of a Global Automotive Empire. Tanooki Press. ISBN 978-1-954306-00-4.
- ——————; Ghosn, Carole (3 March 2021). Ensemble, toujours (in French). Humensis. ISBN 979-10-329-1652-0.

=== Articles ===
- Ghosn, Carlos (1 January 2002). "Saving the Business Without Losing the Company". Harvard Business Review. ISSN 0017-8012.
