= Al-Salam Hospital =

Al Salam Hospital or Hopital de la paix

Geography
- Location: Bahssas Tripoli, Lebanon
- Coordinates: 34.421684°N 35.826783°E

Organisation
- Type: Community, District General

Services
- Standards: Lebanese private hospitals accreditation
- Emergency department: Yes
- Beds: 180

History
- Founded: 1996

Links
- Website: www.alsalamhosp.com/en/
- Lists: Hospitals in Lebanon

Al Salam Hospital or Hopital de la paix (Arabic: مستشفى السلام طرابلس) founded in 1996, is a private hospital located in Tripoli, Lebanon and has a trauma center, an angiology unit with interventional radiology available, a stroke unit, a cardiovascular and abdominal vascular unit, a dermatology unit, a plastic surgery unit, a burn center, a polysomnography unit and a new intensive care unit.

These services were added to the main services that the hospital provided, such as General Surgery, General Medicine, Obstetrics, Pediatrics, Critical Care, Laboratory, a Blood Bank, Hemodialysis, Chemotherapy, Physiotherapy, Radiology, scanners and ultrasound. The hospital has a capacity of 180 beds within its 10 floors.

in 2011, the hospital added other services

- Trauma Center with eight emergency rooms.
- Hyperbaric Chamber
- Dermatology unit and Plastic Surgery for early detection of skin tumors.
- Burn center with five patient rooms laminar flow. The service has more than 18 dedicated patient rooms today with a complete second ICU unit also dedicated to the burn center and containing up to 12 more patient rooms.

in 2016, the hospital added a second ICU unit for the burn center. And also a Neonatal unit.

The hospital meet standards of Ministry of Health – Lebanon, ISO 9001.

== See also ==
- List of hospitals in Lebanon
