= Nidal Yehya =

Lebanese diplomat

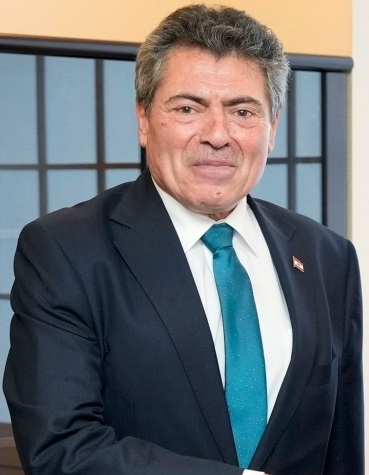
Nidal YEHYA in 2025

Nidal Yehya is a Lebanese diplomat currently serving as Lebanon's ambassador to Japan. He was previously the ambassador for Lebanon in Senegal and Australia, Consul of the embassies in Iran and Venezuela, the Consul General of the embassy in Egypt, and the Deputy Minister of the embassy in Serbia.

== Biography ==
Yehya served as the ambassador to Japan in December, 2017.

In 2019, he was accused of helping former Nissan chief executive Carlos Ghosn escape Japan and travel to Lebanon. Yehya denied any involvement of the embassy in the escape of Ghosn.
