= Caroline Ghosn =

American businesswoman (born 1987)

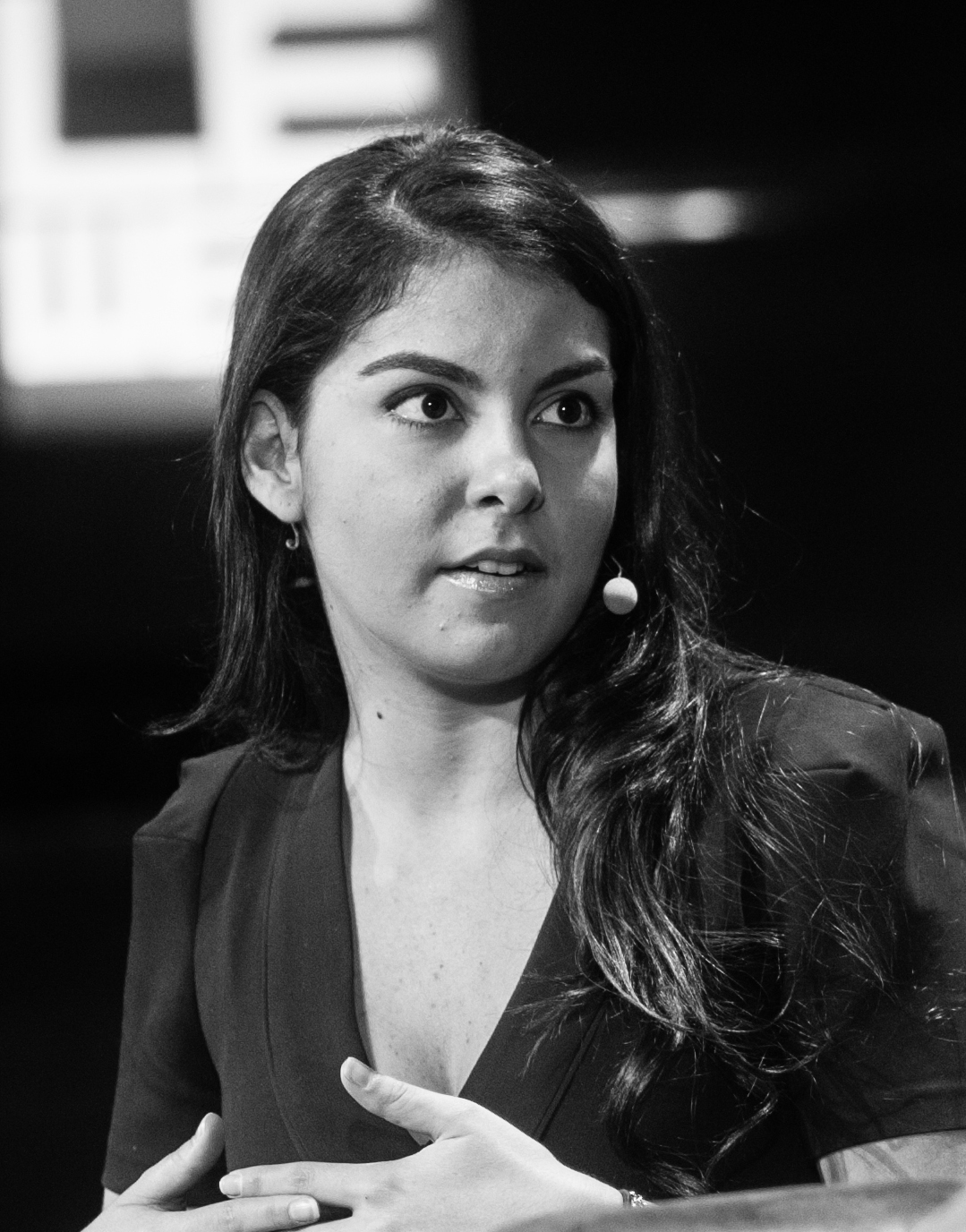
Ghosn

Caroline Ghosn is the eldest child of former Nissan and Renault CEO, Carlos Ghosn.

In 2011 she founded Levo (formerly Levo League) In 2020, she founded Recto Verseau Art Collective, a public art and film production studio.

In 2025, she founded Experience Architects, an experiential design studio. Recent works include Lead Artist of the Temple of Together at Burning Man (2024) and playing the lead in off-Broadway premiere of Duality (2024).

== Business career ==
In 2011 Ghosn founded Levo to help millennials achieve success in the workplace. Following the 2018 arrest of her father, the domains for Levo.com and levoleague.com expired and are used by unrelated entities.

== Personal life ==
In July 2018 Ghosn married Nicholas Flanders in Japan.

Ghosn is the eldest child of former Nissan and Renault CEO, Carlos Ghosn, and his first wife Rita Khordahi.
