= Dora, Lebanon =

Dora الدورة
- City
- Location within Lebanon
- Coordinates: 33°54′N 35°34′E
- Country: Lebanon
- Governorate: Mount Lebanon Governorate
- District: Matn District

Government
  - Time Zone: GMT +2 (UTC)
  - - Summer (DST): +3 (UTC)
  - Area Code(s): (+961) 1
- Time zone: UTC+2 (EET)
  - Summer (DST): UTC+3 (EEST)
- Dialing code: +961

Dora (Arabic: الدورة, romanized: ad-Dawrah) also spelled Doura or Daura, is a suburb north-east of Beirut in the Matn District of Mount Lebanon Governorate. The suburb has commercial and residential zones. Dora is administered by Bourj Hammoud municipality.

== History ==
During the Lebanese Civil War, Dora came under the control of the Lebanese Forces. In early April 1989, there was a massive fire at a fuel depot in Dora. The sound of one of the liquid gas containers exploding was heard 40 km away in Sidon.

== Demographics ==
Dora is a mainly Christian suburb of Beirut but Lebanese of other faiths also call the suburb home. Foreign laborers, especially Egyptians, Iraqis and Sri Lankans also live in Dora due to the lower-cost rents available.

== Economy ==
Dora is one of Beirut's busiest suburbs with many companies and factories located in the suburb. The Dora Commercial Centre is a mixed-use commercial establishment and one of Lebanon's largest malls, City Mall, which formerly housed a branch of Giant, a European hypermarket chain based in France, now called TSC Mega. The center also hosts Cinema City, a nine-screen multiplex of 1,789 seats arranged around a central sky-lit atrium.

== Hospitals ==
The suburb is home to Hôpital Saint Joseph des Soeurs de la Croix, which was founded in 1952 by the Venerable Père Jacques.

== Religious Institutions ==
There are numerous churches in Dora, including the Church of Saint Joseph and the Christian Endeavor Young Adults Association of the Armenian Evangelical Emmanuel Church.

== Transportation ==
Dora is a major transport hub for buses, minibuses and service taxis to destinations north of Beirut.
