= LAU Medical Center-Rizk Hospital =

Geography
- Location: Zahar Street, Beirut, Lebanon
- Coordinates: 33.885487°N 35.514990°E

Organisation
- Care system: Private
- Type: District General
- Patron: Dr. Toufic Ibrahim Rizk

Services
- Beds: 130

History
- Opened: 1925

Links
- Lists: Hospitals in Lebanon

The LAU Medical Center-Rizk Hospital is on Zahar Street in Beirut, Lebanon.

== History ==
Dr. Rizk Clinic, recently known as LAU Medical Center-Rizk Hospital, was first established by Dr. Toufic Ibrahim Rizk (1892-1983) in 1925 as a private family-owned clinic. In 1953 he selected CIET, a French-Swiss company specialized in hospital construction, to prepare the first building blueprints. In 1954 the first stone of his new hospital was laid. Rizk Hospital opened on February 11, 1957, through the inauguration of its 1st building (Building A).

In 1987, despite internal tensions, violence, and the clinic's geographic location on the green-line of demarcation, a second building was constructed and became fully operational (Building B). Within this period the hospital's accommodation capacity increased from 70 to 130 beds.

Ten years later, in 1997, an expansion project was implemented with the addition of two new Buildings (C) and (D); increasing the hospital's overall accommodation capacity. In 2002, a heliport built on the roof of Building D became operational.

On June 30, 2009, The Rizk Family sold the hospital to Medical Care Holding, in which the Lebanese American University (LAU) possesses controlling interests. The hospital was renamed University Medical Center – Rizk Hospital and it now serves as the primary teaching hospital for LAU's schools of Medicine, Nursing, and Pharmacy. It is now called LAU Medical Center - Rizk Hospital.

== Hospital leadership ==
Sami Rizk, Chief Executive Officer

Georges Ghanem, MD, Chief Medical Officer

Michel Mawad, MD, Dean of the Gilbert and Rose-Marie Chagoury School of Medicine (LAU)
