= Hôpital Saint Joseph des Soeurs de la Croix =

- Sisters of the Holy Cross

Geography
- Location: Dora, Beirut, Lebanon
- Coordinates: 33.893091°N 35.554552°E

Organisation
- Type: Community, District
- Religious affiliation: Hospital of Saint Joseph of the Sisters of the Holy Cross
- Affiliated university: Université Saint-Joseph, Lebanese University
- Patron: Père Jacques

Services
- Beds: 150

History
- Opened: 1952

Links
- Website: www.hopital-stjoseph.com
- Lists: Hospitals in Lebanon

Hôpital Saint Joseph des Soeurs de la Croix or the Hospital of Saint Joseph of the Sisters of the Holy Cross is a private, non-profit medical institution in Dora, Lebanon. It is a residency hospital for the students of the Université Saint-Joseph medical school. The hospital serves the heavily populated northern suburbs of Beirut.

== History ==
The Blessed Père Jacques founded the hospital in 1952 after he had founded the Congrégation des Soeurs Franciscaines de la Croix du Liban which played a major role in helping victims of World War I in Lebanon. The hospital continues to be managed by the Sisters of the Holy Cross and adheres to the ethics of the Lebanese law and the Pontifical Council for Pastoral Assistance to Health Care Workers.

== Hospital campus ==
The main entrance of the hospital is on Rue Hôpital Saint Joseph. The emergency entrance is on Rue Raymond et Aïda Najjar. The hospital consists of three main buildings, BLOC A: Le Centre Médical Raymond et Aïda Najjar, BLOC B: Le Pavillon Hospitalier, and BLOC C: Bloc Technique.
