= List of hospitals in Lebanon =

This is a list of hospitals in Lebanon.

== Hospitals ==
- Ain Wzen Hospital - Ain Wzen
- Akkar Rahal Hospital - Halba
- American University of Beirut Medical Center - Beirut
- Al Iman Hospital - Aley
- Al-Mazloum Hospital - Tripoli
- Al-Salam Hospital - Tripoli
- Al Watani Hospital - Aley
- Al Haykal Hospital - Dahr el Ain, North Lebanon
- Al Hikmeh Hospital - Nabatiye
- Al Najde Hospital - Nabatiye
- Al Janoub Hospital - Nabatiye
- Baabda Governmental Hospital - Baabda
- Baakleen Medical Center-Baakleen
- Bahman Hospital - Dahieh
- Bellevue Medical Center - Mansourieh
- Beirut General Hospital - Beirut
- Beit Chabab Hospital - Beit Chabab, North Metn
- Beirut International Hospital Beirut
- Bikhazi Medical Group - Beirut
- Centre Hospitalier de Bhannes - Bhanness
- Centre Hospitalier du Nord - Zgharta
- Centre Hospitalier Universitaire Notre Dame des Secours - Byblos
- Chtaura Hospital - Chtaura, Bekaa
- Chehayeb International Hospital - Aley
- Clinique du Levant - Horch Tabet - Sin el Fil
- Clemenceau Medical Center - Beirut
- Dar El Amal University Hospital - Douris, Baalbeck
- Dr. Ahmad El Masri Hospital - Bednayel, Beqaa
- Ein w Zein Hospital - Ein w Zein, Shouf
- El Koura Hospital - El Koura
- Ghandour Hospital - Nabatiye
- Hammoud Hospital University Medical Center - Saida
- Hiram Hospital - Tyre - Jal El Bahr
- Hôpital Abou Jaoudeh - Jal el Dib
- Hôpital Des Soeurs Du Rosaire (Haddad) - Gemmayze, Beirut
- Hôpital Hayek - Horsh Tabet, Sin El Fil
- Hôpital Libanais Geitaoui - Beirut
- Hôpital Libano-Français - Zahlé
- Hôpital du Sacré-Cœur - Hazmieh
- Hôpital Serhal – Rabieh
- Hôpital Youssef Rahban – Zgharta
- Hopital Dr. Georges Moarbes - Furn el Chebbak
- Hospital AlKoura - Koura District
- Hospital Albert Haykel - Koura District
- Hotel-Dieu De France - Achrafieh, Beirut
- Islami Private Hospital - Tripoli
- Jabal Amel Hospital - Tyre
- Kamil's National Hospital - Aley
- Keserwan Medical Center
- Khoury General Hospital–Zahle, Lebanon
- LAU Medical Center-Rizk Hospital - Achrafieh, Beirut.
- Lebanese Italian Hospital - Tyre, Lebanon
- Lebanon Heart Hospital - Tripoli
- Makassed General Hospital - Beirut
- Melki Hospital - Tripoli
- Middle East Laser Clinic - Hazmieh
- Monla Hospital - Tripoli
- Mount-Lebanon Hospital, Gharios Medical Center - Chiyah
- Nabatiye Governmental Hospital - Nabatiye
- New Mazaloum hospital - Tripoli
- Nini Hospital - Tripoli
- Notre Dame Maritime hospital - Byblos
- Notre Dame Hospital - Jounieh
- Orient Hospital - Beirut
- Rafik Hariri University Hospital - Jnah
- Sahel Hospital - Beirut
- Saint Charles Hospital - Fayadieh
- Saint George Hospital - Beirut
- Saint Georges Hospital - Ajaltoun
- Saint Joseph Hospital - Dora, Lebanon
- St Therese Hospital - Hadath
- Saydet Zgharta Hospital - Zgharta
- Tannourine Governmental Hospital - Tannourine, Batroun
- Trad Hospital - Beirut
- Tal Chiha Hospital - Zahle, Beqaa
- Zahraa University Hospital - Beirut
- LAYAKA Health and wellness center - Zalka

== Images ==
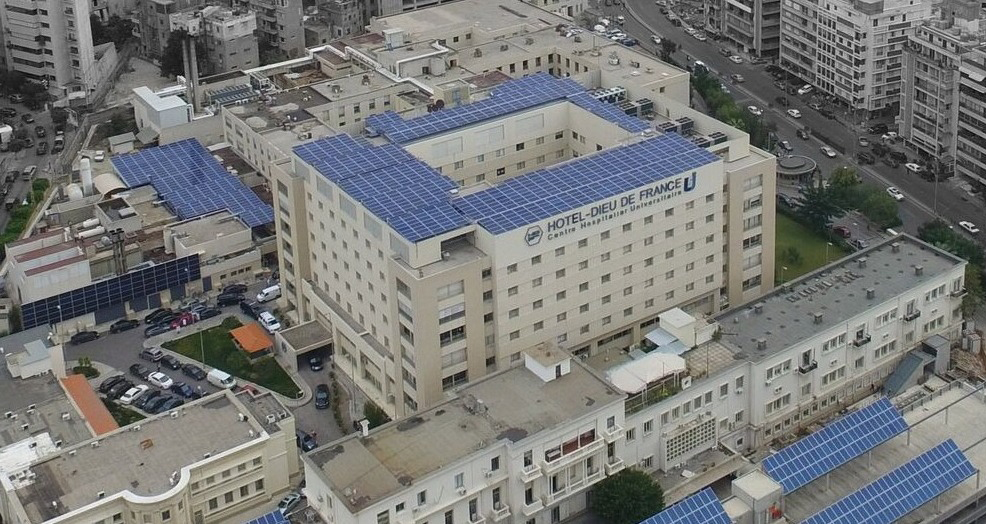
Aerial view of Hôtel Dieu de France.

Bellevue Medical Center in Mansourieh

Rafik Hariri University Hospital (formerly the Beirut Governmental University Hospital.

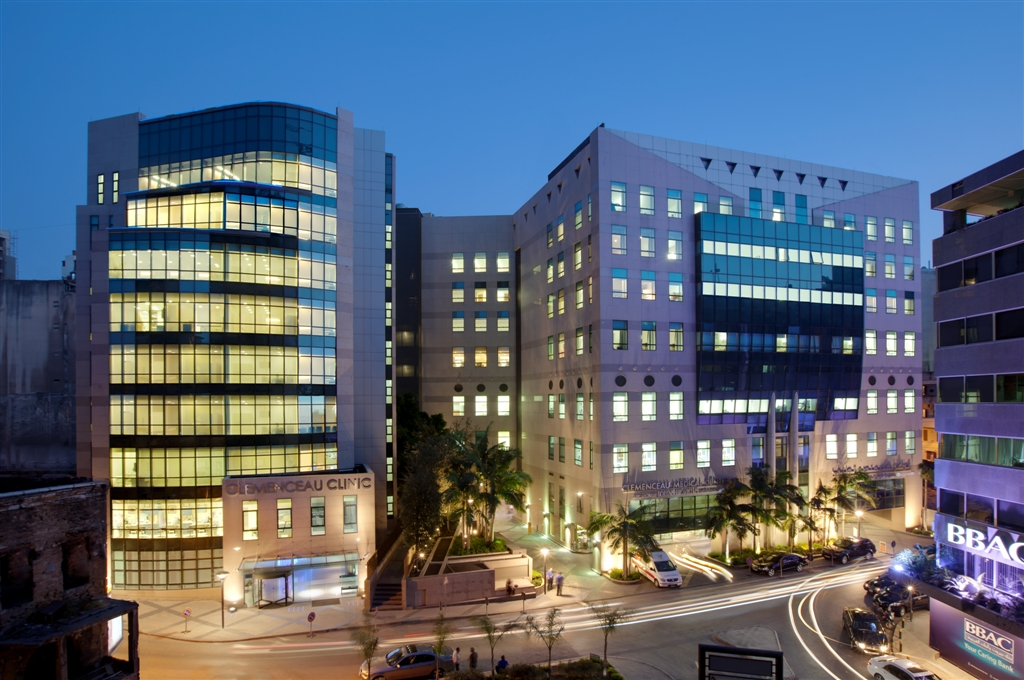
Clemenceau Medical Center, Beirut
