= COVID-19 pandemic in Lebanon =

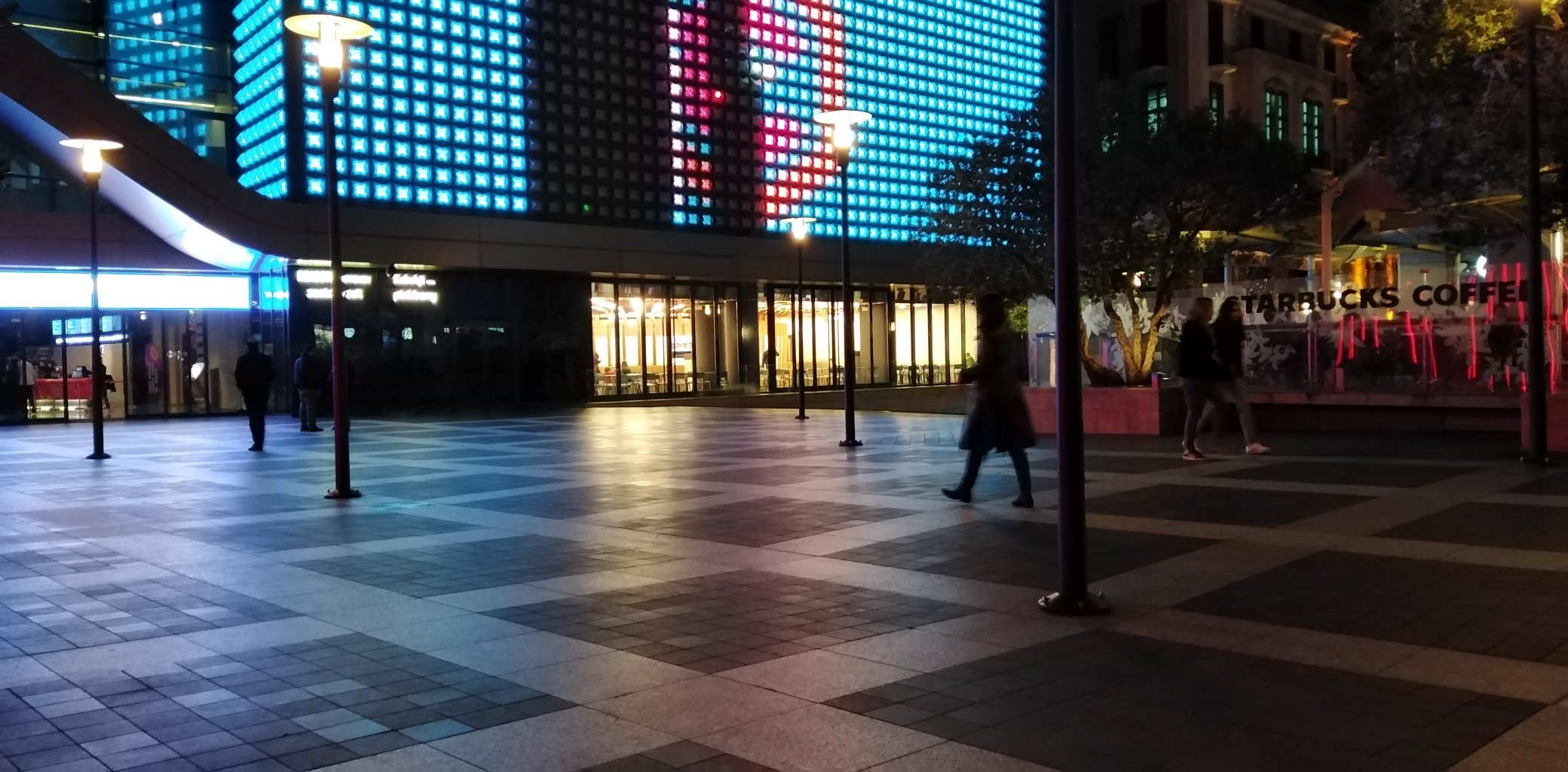
- Disease: COVID-19
- Pathogen: SARS-CoV-2
- Location: Lebanon
- First outbreak: Wuhan, China
- Index case: Beirut
- Arrival date: 21 February 2020 (6 years, 6 months and 5 days ago)
- Confirmed cases: 1,239,904
- Recovered: 1,223,598
- Deaths: 10,947
- Fatality rate: 0.88%

Government website
- Ministry of Public Health: https://www.moph.gov.lb/en

In Lebanon, the worldwide pandemic of coronavirus disease 2019 (COVID-19) caused by severe acute respiratory syndrome coronavirus 2 (SARS-CoV-2) has resulted in 1,238,552 confirmed cases and 10,936 all-time deaths after COVID-19 was confirmed to have reached Lebanon in February 2020.

== Background ==
On 12 January, the World Health Organization (WHO) confirmed that a novel coronavirus was the cause of a respiratory illness in a cluster of people in Wuhan City, Hubei, China, who had initially come to the attention of the WHO on 31 December 2019.

COVID-19 is transmitted through little droplets carrying the virus. These droplets can enter the body through the eyes, mouth, or nose, and they might contaminate surfaces.

Unlike SARS of 2003, the case fatality rate for COVID-19 has been much lower, but the transmission has been significantly greater with a significant total death toll.

Lebanon was successful in handling the pandemic during its beginning, having reported between 0 and 100 daily cases from 15 March 2020 to 12 July 2020. After the Beirut port explosion on 4 August 2020, cases began to skyrocket, with Lebanon reporting over 1,000 cases on most days since mid-September and setting a new record of 2,817 cases of COVID-19 in one day on 6 December 2020.

== Timeline ==
.
Date
.
.
.
.
Cases
Deaths
Recoveries

21 February 2020	26 February 2020	28 February 2020	29 February 2020	1 March 2020	2 March 2020	4 March 2020	6 March 2020	7 March 2020	8 March 2020	9 March 2020	10 March 2020	11 March 2020	12 March 2020	13 March 2020	14 March 2020	15 March 2020	16 March 2020	17 March 2020	18 March 2020	19 March 2020	20 March 2020	21 March 2020	22 March 2020	23 March 2020	24 March 2020	25 March 2020	26 March 2020	27 March 2020	28 March 2020	29 March 2020	30 March 2020	31 March 2020	1 April 2020	2 April 2020	3 April 2020	4 April 2020	5 April 2020	6 April 2020	7 April 2020	8 April 2020	9 April 2020	10 April 2020	11 April 2020	12 April 2020	13 April 2020	14 April 2020	15 April 2020	16 April 2020	17 April 2020	18 April 2020	19 April 2020	20 April 2020	21 April 2020	22 April 2020	23 April 2020	24 April 2020	25 April 2020	26 April 2020	27 April 2020	28 April 2020	29 April 2020	30 April 2020	1 May 2020	2 May 2020	3 May 2020	4 May 2020	5 May 2020	6 May 2020	7 May 2020	8 May 2020	9 May 2020	10 May 2020	11 May 2020	12 May 2020	13 May 2020	14 May 2020	15 May 2020	16 May 2020	17 May 2020	18 May 2020	19 May 2020	20 May 2020	21 May 2020	22 May 2020	23 May 2020	24 May 2020	25 May 2020	26 May 2020	27 May 2020	28 May 2020	29 May 2020	30 May 2020	31 May 2020	1 June 2020	2 June 2020	3 June 2020	4 June 2020
1	2	4	7	10	10	15	22	28	32	41	52	66	73	78	93	99	110	124	133	149	163	230	248	256	304	333	368	391	412	438	446	463	479	494	508	520	527	541	548	575	582	609	619	630	632	641	658	663	668	672	673	677	677	682	688	696	704	707	710	717	721	725	729	733	737	740	741	750	784	796	809	845	859	870	878	886	891	902	911	931	954	961	1024	1086	1097	114	1119	1140	1161	1168	1172	1192	1220	1233	1242	1256	1306
0	0	0	0	0	0	0	0	0	0	0	1	2	3	3	3	3	3	3	4	4	4	4	4	4	4	5	6	7	8	10	11	12	14	14	17	17	18	19	19	19	19	20	20	20	20	21	21	21	21	21	21	21	21	22	22	22	24	24	24	24	24	24	24	25	25	25	25	25	25	26	26	26	26	26	26	26	26	26	26	26	26	26	26	26	26	26	26	26	26	26	26	26	27	27	27	27	28
0	0	0	0	0	0	0	0	0	0	0	0	1	1	1	1	1	2	3	3	3	8	8	8	8	8	20	23	23	30	30	32	32	43	44	44	54	54	54	60	64	64	67	67	67	67	67	80	80	85	95	99	100	102	108	140	140	143	145	145	145	150	150	150	150	150	200	200	200	220	223	234	234	234	234	236	236	246	247	247	251	251	251	663	673	677	688	688	689	692	699	705	709	712	715	719	724	731
Source : Lebanese Ministry of Public Health. As of 4 June 2020

=== February 2020 ===
On 21 February 2020, Lebanon confirmed its first case of COVID-19: a 45-year-old woman traveling back from pilgrimage in Qom, Iran tested positive for SARS-CoV-2 and was transferred to a hospital in Beirut.

On 26 February, a second woman, who returned from Iran on the same Mahan Air flight as the first patient, also tested positive.

On 27 February, a 77-year-old Iranian man, who arrived from Iran on 24 February, tested positive and was admitted to Rafik Hariri University Hospital in Beirut.

On 28 February, a Syrian woman tested positive and was admitted to Rafik Hariri University Hospital in Beirut.

On 29 February, the total reached 7 confirmed cases.

=== March 2020 ===
On 1 March, the Ministry of Health announced 3 new cases, bringing the total cases to 13. These three people had isolated themselves upon arriving to Lebanon from Iran days before.

On 4 March, total confirmed cases reached 15.

On 10 March, the first coronavirus-related death in Lebanon was recorded.

On 11 March, Rafik Hariri University Hospital announced the second death, a 55-year-old man. There were also 9 new cases. The first fully recovered patient was also announced.

On 12 March, the third death was reported: a 79-year-old man who was infected from the virus's first killed patient in Lebanon, who was 59, at a hospital in Byblos.

On 13 March, the total number of cases reached 78. These included an employee at the Ministry of Public Health.

On 14 March, 15 new cases were announced in Lebanon, bringing the total to 93.

On 15 March, 6 new cases were announced, bringing the total to 99. Lebanon declared a state of medical emergency. The government announced the two-week closure of Beirut Airport, seaports and land entrances to begin on 18 March.

On 21 March, then Prime Minister, Hassan Diab, in a televised speech, urged people in Lebanon to implement "self-curfew", adding that security forces would enforce the lockdown measures.

On 26 March, Lebanon imposed a partial curfew from 7 p.m. to 5 a.m. to slow the spread of the virus. On that day, 35 new cases were announced, bringing the total number of cases to 368.

On 30 March, there were 446 confirmed cases and 11 deaths.

=== April 2020 ===
On 2 April, 62-year-old Philippine ambassador to Lebanon, Bernardita Catalla, died of COVID-19 in Beirut. She was the first Filipino diplomat to die from the disease. Human Rights Watch released a report saying that at least 21 Lebanese municipalities have introduced discriminatory restrictions on Syrian refugees that do not apply to Lebanese residents as part of their efforts to combat COVID-19, undermining the country's public health response.

On 4 April, the Minister of Health department announced there were 520 total cases of COVID-19.

On 9 April, the Lebanese Cabinet extended the national lockdown, which started on 15 March and was extended on 26 March, for an additional two weeks until 26 April.

On 22 April, a Palestinian from Syria became the first case reported in a refugee camp, located in the Wavel refugee camp in Bekaa. The total number of cases was 682, with 22 deaths.

=== May 2020 ===
On 5 May, the national lockdown was extended by the government for an additional two weeks until 24 May. The total number of cases was 741, with 25 deaths.

On 7 May, 25 Lebanese citizens who boarded an inbound flight from Nigeria tested positive.

On 13 May, a full lockdown went into effect until 18 May due to a large increase in positive cases. Over 100 new cases in the previous 4 days were announced, bring the total number of infected to 870, with 26 deaths.

On 21 May, Lebanon's Health Ministry reported 63 new cases of the coronavirus, the largest single-day increase since the outbreak of the pandemic. Many of the new cases were the result of Lebanese expatriates returning home, Information Minister Manal Abdel Samad said.

=== August 2020 ===
At the morning of 3 August, the head of the Rafik Hariri University Hospital, which served as the main COVID-19 medical facility in Lebanon, warned that it was approaching full capacity.

On 4 August, Beirut's explosion overwhelmed the capital's health services with thousands of wounded. Following the explosion, three of Beirut's major hospitals were totally incapacitated, and three others were partially damaged. The explosion killed 218 people and injured 7,000.

On 6 August, 2 new deaths and a record 255 new cases were reported by the National News Agency in Lebanon.

On 11 August, Lebanon announced a record daily number of over 300 COVID-19 infections and 7 deaths.

On 18 August 2020, following a surge in infections, Lebanon ordered a two-week lockdown.

=== September 2020 ===
On 27 September 2020, Gebran Bassil's party said he was infected with a "mild" case of COVID-19 as cases continued to surge throughout Lebanon. In addition, two major prisons in Lebanon, Roumieh Prison and Zahle Prison, witnessed large outbreaks in the last weeks of September, with 377 and 238 confirmed cases respectively. This caused outrage among the prisoners, as they called for the appropriate measures to be taken.

=== October 2020 ===
On 4 October, 111 towns and villages were placed under lockdown, which will last until 12 October. This comes after 1,248 new cases and 7 new deaths were reported on 1 October.

On 12 October, 169 towns and villages were placed under lockdown for a week. Many of the towns had already been under lockdown the week before. The total number of cases reached 52,558, along with 455 deaths.

On 19 October 2020, the General Director of the General Directorate of General Security Abbas Ibrahim tested positive while in the United States. The Wall Street Journal reported that he had met national security adviser Robert C. O'Brien at the White House the week before to discuss American citizens held in Syria. The General Directorate of General Security said in a tweet that he was in good health. On 23 October 2020, he returned to Beirut.

=== November 2020 ===
On 2 November, 115 towns and villages were placed under lockdown. A nationwide curfew from 9 p.m. to 5 a.m. also took effect. The total number of cases reached 82,617, along with 643 deaths.

=== December 2020 ===
On 21 December, the first case of the variant strain was detected on a flight coming from the United Kingdom. On 26 December, the total number of cases reached 165,933, along with 1,000 deaths.

On 28 December, Lebanon's health minister announced it had reserved 2 million doses of the Pfizer-BioNTech vaccine, expected to be delivered by February 2021.

=== January 2021 ===
In January 2021, the healthcare system was on the verge of collapse, as hospitals overloaded and few beds remained available. The head of the Parliamentary Health Committee in the House of Representatives Dr. Asim Araji described the situation as "extremely dangerous". A strict curfew and lockdown were imposed on 7 January 2021 and extended to 8 February 2021.

=== February 2021 ===
The World Bank, which approved to pay $34 million for vaccines for 2 million people, threatened to halt financing them in Lebanon, as it investigated suspected favoritism amid reports that parliament members were inoculated without prior approval.

=== March 2021 ===
As of 16 March, there have been 423,433 confirmed cumulative cases and 5,474 deaths because of coronavirus.

On 18 March, it was reported that the first batch of Sputnik-V vaccines will arrive soon to Lebanon and will be available in all hospitals for 38 US dollars.

On 24 March 2021, Syrian authorities said that they will provide emergency oxygen supplies to Lebanon who's enduring a shortage of oxygen.

On 26 March, Lebanon received the first batch of 50.000 doses of Russian vaccines, noting that, according to the Lebanese Health Ministry, Lebanon has already received 224,640 Pfizer-BioNTech doses over the past six weeks.

=== April 2021 ===
On 8 April 2021, the Lebanese Armed Forces (LAF) started the vaccination campaign in 21 centers in Lebanon and the LAF commander, along with other officers, took the vaccine.

=== May 2021 ===
Lebanese authorities imposed a curfew for two days during Eid al-Fitr celebrations and only allowed a 30% capacity at mosques.

=== June 2021 ===
As of 28 June 2021, 545,363 cases were confirmed, with a 0.2% weekly change.

=== February 2022 ===
On 21 February 2022, Dr. Abdul Rahman Bizri, the head of the National Committee for the Administration of coronavirus vaccines stated that Lebanon has been able to deal with the COVID-19 pandemic well despite its "critical and difficult circumstances," and that the coronavirus "has begun to turn from a pandemic to an endemic".

== Statistics ==
=== New cases per day ===
View source data.

=== New deaths per day ===
View source data.

As of August 2023, Lebanon has over 1.2 million confirmed cases and almost 11,000 deaths due to the virus. The figures may be higher, due to underreporting.

== Containment ==
=== Education ===
On 28 February, the Minister of Education Tarek al-Majzoub announced the closure of all educational institutions starting on 29 February until 8 March. The decision was seen as unnecessarily strict by some universities including the American University of Beirut, the Lebanese American University, and the Université Saint-Joseph who called for evidence-based decision-making to avoid unnecessary panic. After initially announcing that it would stay open in the face of the COVID-19 pandemic, and ignoring the Lebanese Ministry of Education and Higher Education's request that it shut down, in early March 2020 the university announced that it would close down. The universities did ultimately abide by the decision and close after discussions with the Minister of Education. The American University of Beirut has consequently formed an expert committee for independent advising on the pandemic.

On 6 March, the Minister of Health Hamad Hassan declared that "Lebanon is no longer in Coronavirus containment stage" following the entry of several new cases to Lebanon coming from countries previously classified as not infected and urged the population to take preventive measures such as avoiding public venues, like resorts and theaters. Following this statement, the closure of schools, universities, and nurseries was extended to 14 March.

=== Religion ===
In reaction to the pandemic, several religious institutions in Lebanon decided to act proactively changing traditional ceremony methods to limit the spread of the virus. Churches and mosques were cleaned and disinfected, and practices adjusted. Within Christian communities, churches have emptied fonts of holy water, and communion is carried out by handing the Eucharist instead of placing directly in the mouth. Similarly, within Muslim communities, it was recommended that people use their own prayer rugs and do ritual cleaning at home. Instructions by both religious groups recommend greetings without hand-shaking nor kissing.

Churches and mosques were reopened on 10 May at reduced capacity. The number of worshippers was not allowed to exceed 30% of the total capacity, and sanitary conditions and preventive measures were to be followed. Churches and mosques had been closed since 15 March to prevent the spread of the virus.

=== Public places and businesses ===
On 21 January, weeks before the first case in Lebanon was confirmed, the Lebanese Football Association announced that they would suspend operations due to financial reasons; this suspension caused all remaining games of the 2019–20 Lebanese Premier League season to be cancelled.

On 6 March, gyms, cinemas, theaters, and nightclubs were ordered to close their doors.

On 11 March, all restaurants in Lebanon closed.

On 12 March, most major malls announced their closure until further notice.

On 4 May, restaurants and barbers were allowed to reopen, although at reduced capacity.

On 12 October, nightclubs and bars were ordered to close alongside an expanded lockdown.

=== Government ===
On 9 March, Lebanese Parliament closed down. All people were instructed by the government to stay home, and the army was asked to intervene by order of the Lebanese president and prime minister.

On 12 March, the government announced that internet service through the public provider Ogero would be boosted through the end of April, to encourage users to stay home. Other private internet companies and phone line companies followed suit with similar discounts/boosts for their customers.

== Technology ==
On 21 February 2020, the international Lebanese website, "Lebanon Info Center", was the first Lebanese website to officially cover the COVID-19 situation in Lebanon, with its page "Lebanon Coronavirus (COVID-19) Emergency", thus, it was the first to offer official emergency and cases numbers, non-commercial recommendations and advice that are based on science and the actual situation on the Lebanese territories.

On 12 March 2020, a media site in Lebanon, The961, announced the launch of a live tracker monitoring the number of confirmed cases, deaths, and recoveries in Lebanon in real-time, manually cross-referencing three sources by directly communicating with the Ministry of Health, World Health Organization and the Lebanese Red Cross. In the announcement thread, The961 founder, Anthony Kantara, explained the frustration of the lack of consistent and clear information as the motivator. The dedicated page also includes the latest news, updates and FAQs surrounding COVID-19.

On 19 March, the Information Minister Manal Abdul Samad launched a government site dedicated to the COVID-19 outbreak in Lebanon. This website provides the latest statistics regarding COVID-19 infections in Lebanon. However, the website updates may depend on the ministry availability constraints.

== Politicization ==
As the first flight introducing coronavirus patients was a flight from Qom, Iran—a city plagued by the coronavirus—some Lebanese citizens and media have cast blame onto Iran and Hezbollah for being silent about the issue and not taking necessary measures against it. Some agents blamed Iran for bringing the virus into the country. Following that, Information Minister Manal Abdul-Samad warned against involving political tensions in the pandemic.

== Economic impact ==
Non-payment of salaries was reported. A suffocating economic crisis has left Lebanon's poor with little or no means to cope with extra hardship.

The United Nations High Commissioner for Human Rights Michelle Bachelet raised the alarm on Lebanon's socio-economic crisis on 10 July 2020. Her statement cited Lebanese and UN figures that estimated 75% of Lebanon's population are in need of aid. Since October, the lebanese pound had lost more than 80% of its value and chronic power cuts are now the norm. In addition, Lebanon hosts more than 250,000 migrant workers, many of which have lost their jobs, not been paid, been left homeless, and unable to send remittances to their families back home. Bachelet called on the country's political parties to urgently enact reforms and prioritize essentials such as electricity, food, health and education.

== Controversy ==
Lebanon has faced a significant shortage of test kits amidst the outbreak. Al Jazeera reported that illegal migrants have no access to testing.

== See also ==
- COVID-19 pandemic in the State of Palestine
- COVID-19 pandemic by country and territory
