= Centre Hospitalier Universitaire Notre Dame des Secours =

Notre Dame des Secours - University Hospital (NDSUH)
- Lebanese Maronite Order

Geography
- Location: Byblos, Lebanon
- Coordinates: 34.128271°N 35.658966°E

Organisation
- Care system: Private
- Type: Teaching
- Affiliated university: Holy Spirit University of Kaslik

Services
- Emergency department: Yes
- Beds: 209

Helipads
- Helipad: Yes

History
- Founded: 1977

Links
- Website: www.chu-nds.org
- Lists: Hospitals in Lebanon

Notre Dame des Secours - University Hospital (NDSUH) (مستشفى سيدة المعونات الجامعي) is a Lebanese teaching hospital located in Byblos, Lebanon. It is a Non profit community hospital owned by the Lebanese Maronite Order and Monastery of Notre Dame des Secours. The hospital is tied with the Holy Spirit University of Kaslik Faculty of Medicine and Medical Sciences and the Higher Institute of Nursing Sciences.

== History ==
Notre Dame des Secours University Hospital (NDSUH) in Byblos is regarded as a trusted reference in the Lebanese healthcare sector. In 1950, the Lebanese Maronite Order established a small dispensary in the city of Jbeil, with 18 beds, to provide basic medical care. With the growing demand for hospitalization in the city and surrounding areas, and the limited capacity of the old hospital, a new facility was built in 1977 with 75 beds, today. It continued to expand and develop until it became a major medical center serving the Lebanese community.

In 2007, the hospital achieved another significant milestone when it was classified as a university hospital by the Ministry of Public Health, thanks to its academic tie with the Holy Spirit University of Kaslik. The hospital plays a pivotal role in providing patient-centered healthcare in the Mount Lebanon and North Lebanon regions.

Today, the hospital consists of seven interconnected buildings, with a total of 209 beds, and relies on a sizable team of medical, nursing, and administrative staff covering all specialties. It welcomes more than 73,000 patients annually for treatment and hospitalization.

== See also ==
- Holy Spirit University of Kaslik
