= Saint George Hospital University Medical Center =

Geography
- Location: achrafieh, Beirut, Lebanon
- Coordinates: 33°53′38″N 35°31′24″E

Organisation
- Type: Teaching
- Affiliated university: Saint George University of Beirut
- Patron: Charles.R Modica
- Network: St George Hospital

Services
- Emergency department: Yes
- Beds: 300

Helipads
- Helipad: Yes

History
- Founded: 1878

Links
- Website: http://www.stgeorgehospital.org
- Lists: Hospitals in Lebanon

Saint George Hospital University Medical Center (Note: (Arabic: مستشفى القديس جاورجيوس للروم الأرثوذكس, romanized: Mustashfá al-Qiddīs Jāwurjiyūs lil-Rūm al-Urthūdhuks or مستشفى القديس جاورجيوس الجامعي)), also known as Al-Roum Hospital (Note: (Arabic: مستشفى الروم)), is the oldest Lebanese Christian teaching hospital founded in 1878. It is affiliated with Saint George University of Beirut and one of the three leading Lebanese medical centres. It is located in Rmeil, Beirut.

== Overview ==
The hospital configuration is a T-shaped 15-floor building currently housing 330 beds. It is affiliated with The Centre Hospitalier Universitaire de Toulouse and the Centre Hospitalier Universitaire de Poitiers.

In 2005, a new building was inaugurated.

== History ==
Saint George Hospital was founded in 1878 as a non-profit community hospital by Panoyot Fakhoury. A member of the Orthodox community, he donated two rooms in his Gemayze home to be used as a clinic and in-patient facility.

A new 90-bed hospital was built in 1913, followed by another 275-bed facility in 1966. The current facility is a 200-bed hospital built in 2004. By 2020, the hospital had 330 beds.

On 4 August 2020, a series of explosions occurred about 1 km (0.6 mi) away from the hospital, at the Port of Beirut, damaging every floor of the hospital, depriving it of power, and forcing it to shut down. Doctors and nurses were treating patients in a nearby parking lot. Within hours, it discharged all its patients, some to other hospitals, and closed. The building was severely damaged and considered too dangerous to enter. The hospital's Director of Intensive Care, Dr. Joseph Haddad, was quoted as saying, "There is no St. George Hospital any more. It's fallen, it's on the floor ... It's all destroyed. All of it." The damage to the hospital was a severe blow to Beirut's healthcare facilities; a COVID-19 pandemic and over 6,000 injuries, as a direct result of the explosions, put great pressure on healthcare facilities.

Although the hospital was forced to temporarily close after the explosion, enough restoration work was completed by the end of August to allow one floor to become operational again. Chief Medical Officer Alexandre Nehme estimated that it would take more than US$40 million and about a year to bring the whole hospital back up to operational status.

Restoration work on the hospital was complete on 3 August 2025 five years after the Beirut port blast. Restoration was funded through the Big Heart Foundation, a UAE based humanitarian organisation, which raised $2.36 million.
