= Junichiro Hironaka =

Japanese lawyer (born 1945)

Junichiro Hironaka (born 1945) is a Japanese lawyer. He is also known as the "Razor" after winning a number of high-profile cases.
