= Hôtel-Dieu Saint-Jacques =

Former hospital in Toulouse, France

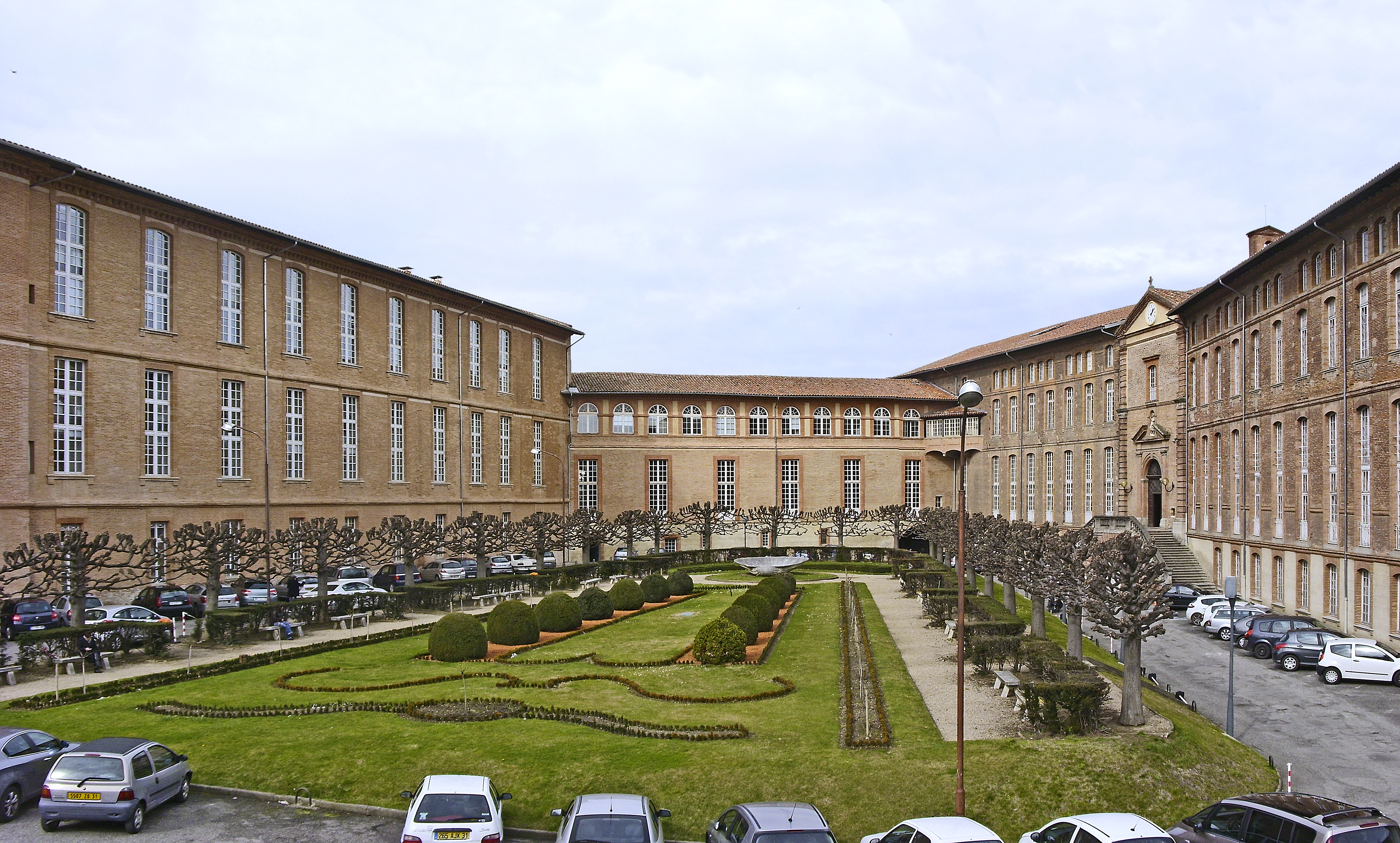
- Hôtel-Dieu Saint-Jacques

Location
- Location: Toulouse
- Interactive map of Hôtel-Dieu Saint-Jacques
- Coordinates: 43.6001091003418°N 1.4490989446640015°E

Architecture
- Parent listing: Routes of Santiago de Compostela in France

The Hôtel-Dieu Saint-Jacques is a former hospital in Toulouse, located at 2 rue Charles-Viguerie. Already in operation in the 12th century on the left bank of the Garonne River, it became the largest hospital in Toulouse following numerous expansions in the 17th and 18th centuries.

The building was listed and then classified as a Historical Monument in 1986 and 1988, and like the Basilica of Saint-Sernin, it has also been a UNESCO World Heritage Site as part of the Routes of Santiago de Compostela in France since 1998.

The last patients left the buildings in 1987. Today, the Hôtel-Dieu houses the administrative center of the Toulouse University Hospital (CHU), as well as the European Institute of Telemedicine, the European Research Center for Skin and Epithelial Tissue, and a museum of the history of medicine. A dental care service still exists within this building today.

== Bibliography ==
- Lise Enjalbert, Hôtel-Dieu Saint-Jacques de Toulouse, Toulouse, Association des Amis de l'Hôtel-Dieu Saint-Jacques et de l'hôpital Saint-Joseph de la Grave, 1989, 71 p., 21 cm (OCLC 490645153, SUDOC 048179434).
- Jacques Frexinos, La grande histoire des hôpitaux de Toulouse : un CHU aux racines millénaires, Toulouse, Éditions Privat, 2019, 427 p. ISBN 978-2-7089-0406-4)
