= Rafik Hariri University Hospital =

Hospital in Baabda district, Lebanon

Coordinates: 33°51′48″N 35°29′29″E

- Lebanese governmental hospitals

- Main entrance

Geography
- Location: Bir Hassan, Greater Beirut, Baabda, Lebanon

Organisation
- Care system: Two-tier
- Type: Teaching
- Affiliated university: Lebanese University

Services
- Standards: Lebanese public hospitals accreditation
- Emergency department: Yes
- Beds: 544

Links
- Website: http://www.bguh.gov.lb/
- Lists: Hospitals in Lebanon

The Rafik Hariri University Hospital (Arabic: مستشفى رفيق الحريري الجامعي, RHUH), formerly known as the Beirut Governmental University Hospital (BGUH), is the largest Lebanese public hospital. It is located on the outskirts of Beirut. The hospital's main building has a capacity of up to 544 beds and comprises seven floors, three annex buildings, a 50-bed hotel, and four villas housing staff dormitories, outpatient clinics, and administrative offices. The hospital is affiliated with the Lebanese University.

== History ==
On February 2, 1979, the Lebanese government decided to build a governmental hospital with a 500-bed capacity on a publicly owned property in Bir Hassan, Beirut. The decision was based on technical studies made by the minister of Health and the Minister of Public Works and Transportation. Due to the advent of the Lebanese Civil War, which significantly weakened the public health care sector, the construction project had to be postponed until 1995 when then prime minister Rafik Hariri laid the cornerstone; construction was finalized during 2000. The hospital was inaugurated on August 2, 2004, with a cost of 121 million US dollars.

As of June 2022, the number of doctors at the hospital was down to 15, whereas 60-odd doctors had worked there a few years prior, and approximately a third of the nursing staff (128 of them) had also left the hospital since the Lebanese economic crisis began.

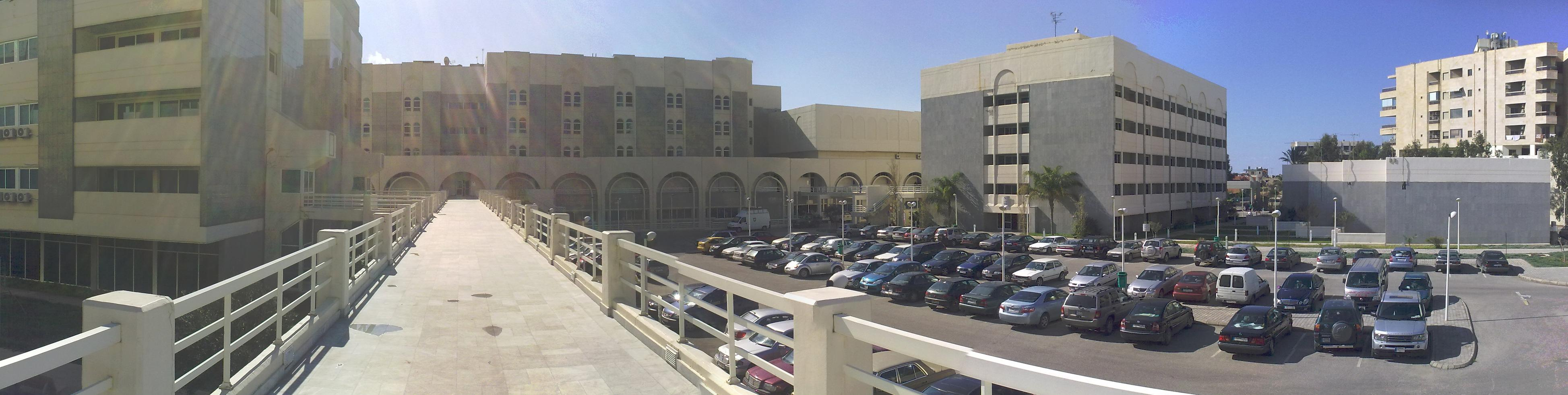
A panoramic view of the inner yard at the Rafik Hariri University Hospital in 2010

== Controversy ==
The RHUH staff went on strike on various occasions due to the repetitive delay in receiving their financial dues, the staff expressed consternation since the hospital's administration did not provide consistent causality for the delay in payment of their salaries which has been occurring since 2010. The hospital staff also complained that the hospital administration withdrew many benefits such as the social security school grants, and withholds health insurance bills from its employees.

In March 2022, hospital staff forced their way into the headquarters of the Lebanese Health Ministry headquarters in Beirut to protest the deterioration of their working conditions and to demand that they be paid their salaries.
