= Centre hospitalier universitaire de Toulouse =

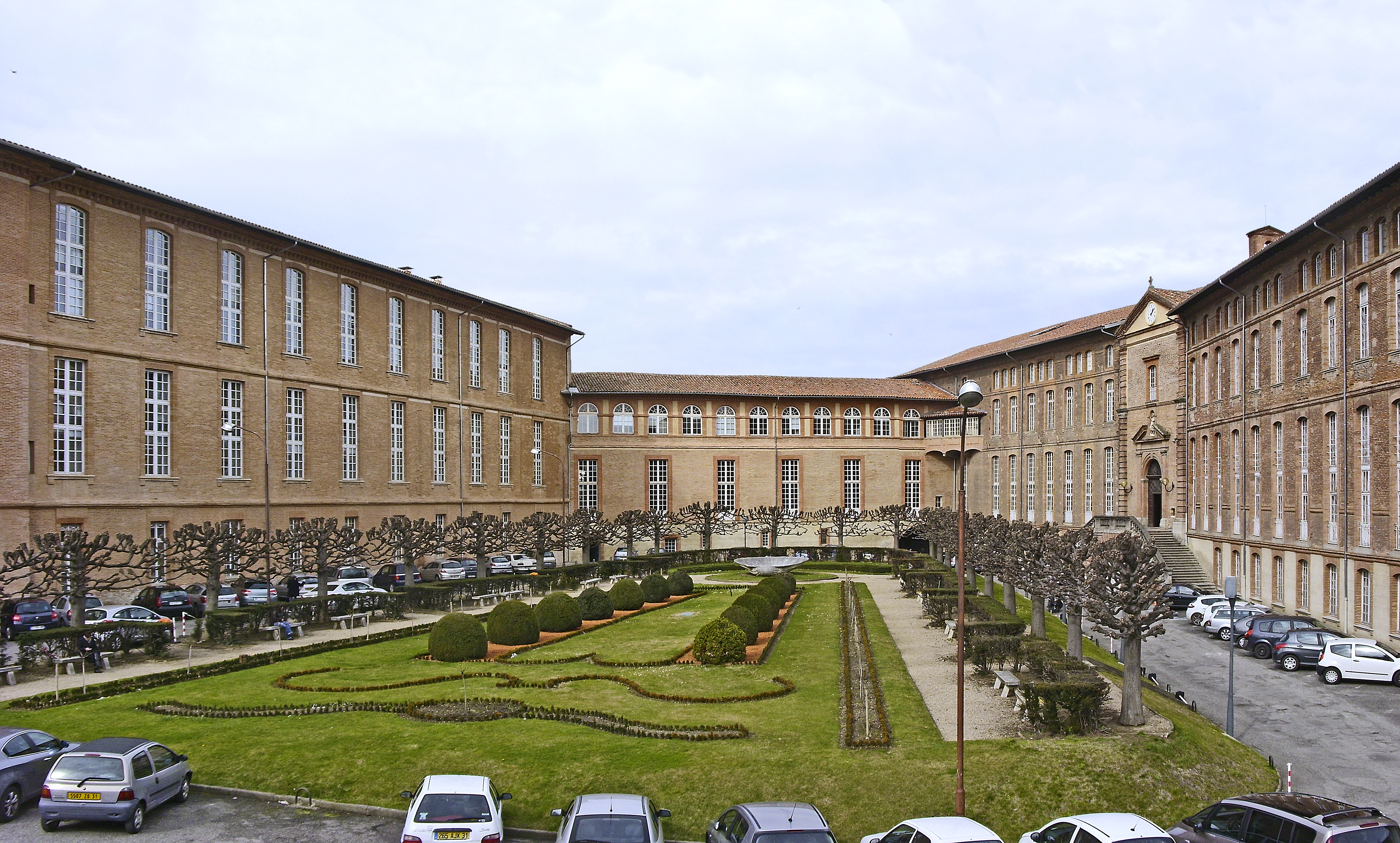
- Centre hospitalier universitaire de Toulouse

Geography
- Location: Toulouse, Occitanie, France
- Coordinates: 43°35′58″N 1°26′11″E

Organisation
- Affiliated university: Toulouse III - Paul Sabatier University

Links
- Website: www.chu-toulouse.fr
- Lists: Hospitals in France

The Centre hospitalier universitaire de Toulouse (French pronunciation: [sɑ̃tʁ ɔspitalje ynivɛʁsitɛːʁ də tuluz]) is a French university hospital center whose administrative center is located at Hôtel-Dieu Saint-Jacques.

The Toulouse University Hospital employs more than 3,632 doctors and medical students and more than 10,000 hospital staff and received 230,000 total hospitalizations, 140,000 visits and sessions and more than 640,000 outpatient consultations in 2013.

It ranks fourth among French University Hospitals in terms of its level of activity and is ranked the best hospital in France in a ranking established in 2012 by the magazine Le Point and includes more than 60 pathologies.

== Institutional Environment ==
The CHU of Toulouse, like all CHUs, is a healthcare institution associated with a university through a convention. It is responsible for a triple mission: healthcare and disease prevention, training healthcare professionals, and medical research.

=== Healthcare and Prevention ===
The CHU provides medical and/or surgical care and patient education. It offers medical and surgical services, both common and complex, through its highly specialized technical platforms. It must provide emergency care 24/7. It also develops alternatives to traditional hospitalization, such as ambulatory surgery or home hospitalization.

The CHU also plays a role in public health. It participates in prevention and health education actions for patients. It organizes or participates in collective information campaigns for the general public through coordinated actions with the associative network (HIV seropositivity, drug addiction, smoking cessation, cardiovascular risks, social medicine).

=== Education and Training ===
The CHU of Toulouse is a partner of the medical faculties (Toulouse Purpan and Toulouse Rangueil), the faculty of pharmacy, and the faculty of dental surgery (components of the University Toulouse III-Paul Sabatier). It is also a partner of the regional teaching and training center for healthcare professions (PREFMS), which is a campus bringing together ten schools and institutes for healthcare professions. As a professional training site, the CHU of Toulouse provides training for medical, pharmacy, dental surgery students, and paramedical students (midwives, nurses, nursing assistants, etc.)

=== Research ===
Regarding research, the CHU is heavily involved in the progress of medical and pharmaceutical sciences and contributes to innovation in cooperation with the medical and science faculties of Toulouse, the National Institute of Health and Medical Research (INSERM), the National Center for Scientific Research (CNRS). In 2021, the budget for research and innovation amounted to 29 million euros.

== Specificities ==
The CHU handles approximately 280,000 hospitalizations and 800,000 consultations each year, placing it fourth among French hospitals in terms of activity. It is the only CHU in the new Occitanie Ouest region, which means it is solely responsible for specialized care, representing fifty percent of its activity.

At the national level, the Toulouse CHU coordinates or is associated with nineteen rare disease reference centers and sixty-eight centers of expertise.

The Toulouse CHU plays a major role in oncology. Cancer treatment represents about a quarter of its activity. In 2014, it partnered with the Claudius Regaud Institute, a private cancer center in Toulouse, to form the University Cancer Institute of Toulouse (IUCT), a new model for the organization of care, research, and education in oncology. This collaboration between a public and a private institution strengthens the quality of care in the Occitanie Ouest region by providing patients with the best expertise close to their homes.

The Toulouse CHU has expertise in telemedicine, which allows easier access to care for isolated individuals or those with mobility difficulties, thanks to innovative communication technologies and collaboration with healthcare professionals (general practitioners, specialists, nurses, pharmacists, physiotherapists).

== Administrative Organization ==
The CHU, like all public hospitals, is a legal entity with administrative autonomy. It is managed by a director and a supervisory board. The director is assisted by an executive board. The CHU also has financial autonomy with its own budget. All personnel belong to the hospital civil service.

The executive board is responsible for hospital management activities, while the supervisory board oversees control activities.

The director is the legal representative of the CHU. They are responsible for the overall management and leadership of the CHU. The director is appointed by decree, upon the proposal of the Ministry of Health and the Ministry of Higher Education and Research. They have authority over personnel, validate expenses and revenues, and are responsible for the proper functioning of the services, except for areas under the responsibility of the supervisory board, executive board, or the medical establishment commission (CME).

The executive board is chaired by the director, with the president of the Medical Establishment Commission serving as the vice-president. The executive board develops the establishment project and approves the medical project prepared by the CME.

The members of the executive board come from CHU personnel, including doctors, nurses, pharmacists, midwives, and dentists. This ensures that the expectations of healthcare professionals are heard and taken into account in the institutional decisions of the CHU.

The supervisory board is the decision-making body. It consists of three colleges, composed of elected representatives from local authorities, representatives of the medical staff and non-medical hospital staff, qualified individuals representing various professions within the CHU, and representatives of users. The supervisory board ensures the implementation of the CHU's strategic orientations. It exercises continuous control over its overall management and ensures its financial balance. All major actors in the hospital field are present on the supervisory board, allowing for a comprehensive view of the hospital and the expression of different perspectives.

The CHU also has consultative bodies:

- The CME: Medical Establishment Commission
- The CSIRMT: Commission on Nursing, Rehabilitation, and Medico-Technical Care
- The CSE: Social and Economic Committee, which replaced the Technical Establishment Committee (CTE) and the Hygiene, Safety, and Working Conditions Committee (CHSCT) on January 1, 2020
- The CLIN: Committee for the Fight against Nosocomial Infections
- The CLUD: Committee for the Fight against Pain

== Institutional Culture ==
There are thirty CHUs in France. In its report of December 17, 2018, the Court of Auditors noted that their care mission is carried out in a heterogeneous manner in terms of volume, activity, or types of procedures and does not always distinguish CHUs from other general hospitals.

The CHU's medical emergency center also houses the French Maritime Medical Consultation Center. Every day, this center provides assistance to sailors navigating the seas and oceans worldwide in case of health issues or accidents, using radio communications that allow the transmission of sound and video.
