= Mercy Hospital =

Mercy Hospital or Mercy Medical Center could refer to the following hospitals in:

== Australia ==
- Werribee Mercy Hospital, Werribee, Victoria
- Mercy Hospital for Women, Melbourne, Heidelberg, Victoria
- St John of God Mt Lawley Hospital, formerly known as Mercy Hospital, Mount Lawley, Western Australia
- Mersey Community Hospital, Tasmania, Australia

== Guyana ==
- St. Joseph Mercy Hospital, Georgetown, Guyana

== Ireland ==
- Mercy University Hospital, Cork

== New Zealand ==
- Mercy Hospital, Dunedin

== United States ==
=== Alabama ===
- Cooper Green Mercy Hospital, Birmingham

=== Arizona ===
- Mercy Gilbert Medical Center, Gilbert

=== California ===
- Mercy San Juan Medical Center, Carmichael
- Mercy Medical Center Merced, Merced
- Mercy General Hospital, Sacramento
- Scripps Mercy Hospital, San Diego
- Mercy Medical Center (Redding), a hospital in Redding, California

=== Florida ===
- Mercy Hospital (Miami)
- Mercy Hospital (St. Petersburg, Florida), a historic building

=== Idaho ===
- Mercy Hospital (Nampa, Idaho), a historic building
- Mercy Medical Center (Idaho), Nampa, the current facility

=== Illinois ===
- Mercy Hospital and Medical Center, Chicago

=== Iowa ===
- Mercy Medical Center (Cedar Rapids, Iowa)
- MercyOne Dubuque Medical Center
- MercyOne Des Moines Medical Center

=== Maine ===
- Northern Light Mercy Hospital, Portland

=== Maryland ===
- Mercy Medical Center (Baltimore, Maryland), Baltimore

=== Massachusetts ===
- Mercy Medical Center (Springfield, Massachusetts)

=== Minnesota ===
- Mercy Hospital (Minnesota), Coon Rapids

=== Missouri ===
- Children's Mercy Hospital, Kansas City
- Mercy Hospital Joplin, Joplin
- Mercy Hospital St. Louis, Creve Coeur

=== Nebraska ===
- Creighton University Medical Center - Bergan Mercy, Omaha

=== New York ===
- Mercy Hospital of Buffalo, Buffalo

=== North Carolina ===
- Atrium Health Mercy, Charlotte

=== Ohio ===
- Mercy Hospital of Defiance, Defiance
- Mercy Health - St. Charles Hospital, Oregon
- Mercy Hospital of Tiffin, Tiffin
- St. Anne Mercy Hospital, Toledo, a hospital in Ohio
- Mercy Health - St. Vincent Medical Center, Toledo
- Mercy Hospital of Willard, Willard
- Mercy Health - St. Elizabeth Youngstown Hospital, Youngstown
- Mercy Medical Center (Canton), a hospital in Ohio

=== Oregon ===
- Mercy Medical Center (Roseburg, Oregon)

=== Pennsylvania ===
- UPMC Mercy

=== Wisconsin ===
- Mercy Medical Center (Oshkosh, Wisconsin)

== Other medical uses ==
- Mercy class hospital ship, a ship class of the United States Navy
- Mercy Medical Airlift, a nonprofit organization providing air transportation to distant medical treatment; see Citizen Corps § Mercy Medical Airlift

== Fictional uses ==
- Mercy Hospital, a hospital originating from the 2008 game Left 4 Dead
- Mercy Hospital (慈愛醫院), a hospital in TVB series The Hippocratic Crush
- Mercy Hospital, a hospital in the 1986 film Star Trek IV: The Voyage Home
- Mercy Hospital, a hospital in the supernatural TV series Ghost Whisperer
- (No) Mercy Hospital, a hospital in the 1977 novel Song of Solomon

== See also ==
- Mercy Health (disambiguation)
