= Mercy Medical Center (Cedar Rapids, Iowa) =

Coordinates: 41.978°N 91.656°W

- Sisters of Mercy
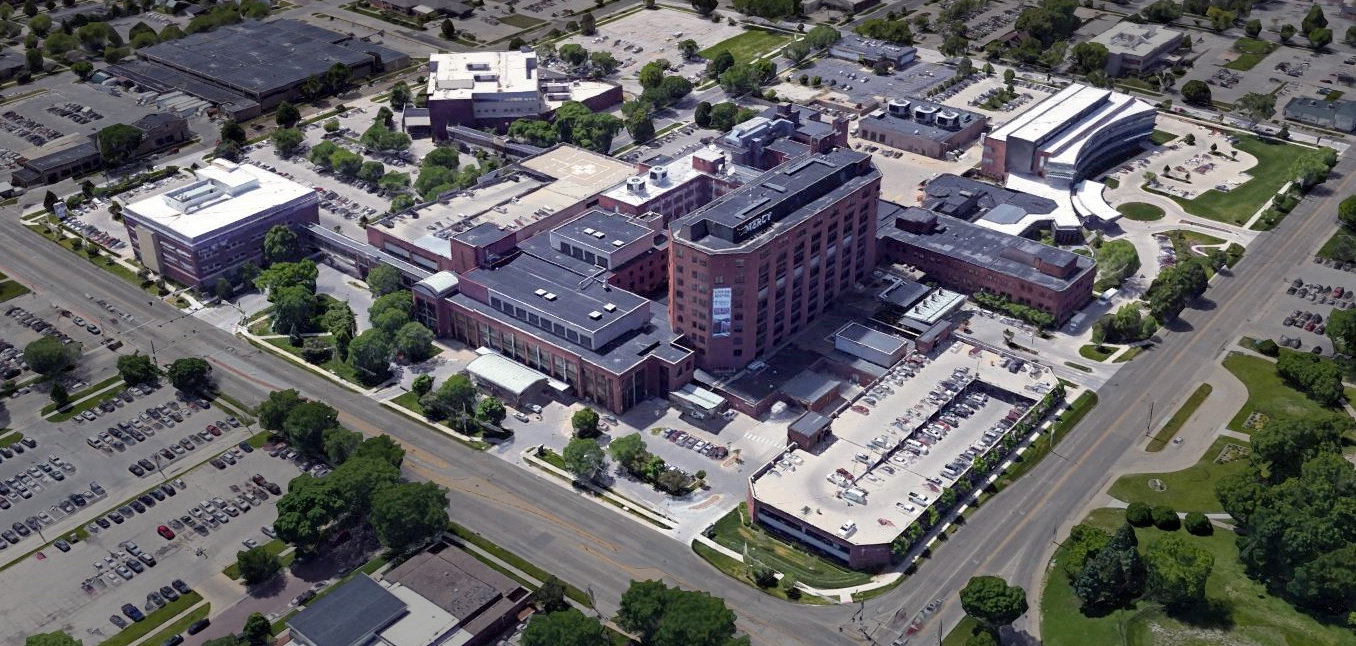
- Mercy Campus

Geography
- Location: Cedar Rapids, Iowa, United States

Organization
- Network: Independent, MercyCare Clinics

Services
- Emergency department: Level III trauma center
- Beds: 450

Helipads
- Helipad: IA72

History
- Founded: 1900

Links
- Website: www.mercycare.org
- Lists: Hospitals in Iowa

Mercy Medical Center is a Catholic hospital in Cedar Rapids, Iowa. The smaller of two metro hospitals, Mercy frequently ranks as either the best in Iowa or one of the top three. Mercy is a non-profit, acute-care medical center with a level III trauma center. Mercy Cedar Rapids is independent and not directly associated with other Mercy hospitals across the state and country. In addition to the non-profit hospital and clinics, Mercy operates outpatient and urgent-care clinics in a for-profit partnership with MercyCare Community Physicians.

== Overview ==
One way to understand more about a hospital is to evaluate how it falls into different categories.

=== Acute care ===
Mercy Medical Center is an acute-care hospital, as opposed to a long-term or specialized facility. Despite this acute-care focus, Mercy does provide an inpatient adult psychiatric ward, an inpatient rehabilitation ward and an off-site nursing home (Hallmar).

=== Trauma center ===
Mercy operates a level III trauma center, which can handle almost all medical emergencies. In extreme or specialized situations, such as severe burns or complex pediatric cases, Mercy can transfer patients by helicopter to the University of Iowa's level I trauma center. Mercy is also the designated emergency room for radiation cases, such as might arise from events at the Duane Arnold Energy Center (DAEC). Mercy was the first hospital in the area to open a trauma center.

=== Community hospital ===
The United States' definition of a community hospital offers problematic distinctions for Mercy. According to the AHA definition, Mercy is a community hospital because it is not federally owned. Other groups, however, say that community hospitals are not teaching hospitals. This might disqualify Mercy, since it has a residency program. Another definition says community hospitals serve a local area, are run by local leaders, and provide financial opportunities for the local economy. Mercy would meet this last definition, since it has remained independent from large healthcare chains, such as UnityPoint.

=== Non-profit ===
Mercy Medical Center is non-profit, established by the Sister of Mercy and governed by the group's charitable code. Mercy does, however, operate the for-profit MercyCare clinics. Doctors and other providers at these clinics are partners in the for-profit organization.

=== Urban vs. rural ===
Mercy serves the urbanized Cedar Rapids metro area, but also serves seven nearby, mostly rural counties. Mercy also provides cardiology, dialysis and chemotherapy outreach services at rural hospitals in those seven counties.

=== Independent ===
As described below, Mercy leadership has rejected merger advances. Mercy remains independent and locally controlled, one of a shrinking number of independent hospitals in the United States.

=== Teaching vs. non-teaching ===
Mercy offers a residency program. MercyCare clinics also frequently host medical students from the University of Iowa's medical school.

=== Number of beds ===
Mercy Medical Center is licensed for 450 beds, but according to 2017 Medicare filings the hospital staffs 243 beds. That makes Mercy the seventh largest of 130 Iowa hospitals. For comparison, the University of Iowa Hospitals and Clinics operates 728 beds, St. Luke's Cedar Rapids operates 345, Covenant (Waterloo) operates 240 and Mercy Medical Center Dubuque operates 176.

== Church restrictions ==
As a Catholic organization, Mercy follows the church's rules guiding healthcare. Those rules prohibit physicians from performing some procedures, even if non-Catholics would consider the care in the patient's best interest. The restrictions primarily impact reproductive and end-of-life care.

US Catholic hospitals follow the Ethical and Religious Directives for Catholic Health Care Services, issued by the United States Conference of Catholic Bishops. The Directives forbid services that are contrary to Catholic teaching. Physicians practicing at Mercy must follow the Directives, even if neither the doctor or the patient are Catholic.

=== Reproductive health ===
In reproductive health, the Directives prohibit:

- Abortion;
- In vitro fertilization

=== End-of-life care ===
==== Assisted suicide ====
In states other than Iowa, Catholic hospitals may face patient desire for assisted suicide. Since assisted suicide is illegal in Iowa, Mercy does not face this issue.

==== Removing nutrition and hydration ====
For end-of-life care, the Directives generally prohibit removing life-supporting nutrition and hydration. Even if a patient's advance healthcare directive specifies situations where he or she refuses feeding tubes or IV nutrition, Mercy and other Catholic hospitals must decline to follow those patient instructions. Instead, the patient may be transferred to nearby St. Luke's Hospital or another facility.

Mercy's hospital-ethics committee helps physicians review whether or not life-support is required. These decisions are guided by two key Catholic Directives. Directive 59 specifies that a patient's end-of-life decision will be honored, “unless it is contrary to Catholic moral teaching.” Directive 58 says that Catholic health care facilities must generally provide artificial nutrition and hydration for patients who cannot take food and water orally.

In cases where the patient's disease or condition will directly and promptly cause death, nutrition and hydration is not frequently an issue. Instead, conflicts arise from conditions like dementia or Alzheimer's disease, and from patients in a persistent vegetative state. When these patients cannot eat and drink, Catholic teaching says that failure to provide nutrition and hydration is effectively euthanasia. This is because the primary medical condition will not kill the patient, but removing food and water will.

== History ==
The Sisters of Mercy opened Mercy Hospital in 1900 as a 15-bed facility in a converted two-story house. In less than a year, hospital usage outgrew the small location and the Sisters began searching for a new site.

In 1901, the Sisters bought land at Sixth Avenue and Ninth Street, SE, which is still part of Mercy's current site.

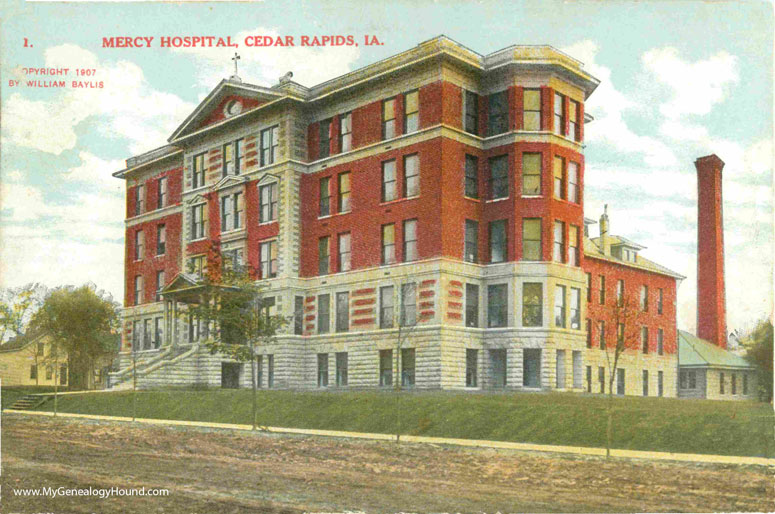
Mercy Hospital Cedar Rapids Iowa, 1903 Building, Now Demolished

The new facility opened in 1903 as a 100-bed, five-story hospital. The 1903 building served patients until 1971, when it was torn down because it no longer met hospital regulations.

Mercy's campus continued growing to meet demands. Major building efforts include the following.

- 1923: The Sisters opened an addition to the 1903 building. The five-story building increased Mercy's capacity to 200 beds and added a new surgery and maternity ward.
- 1944: Mercy used federal funding to erect a nursing school next to the hospital. After the nursing school closed in 1971, the building housed the Family Practice Center and a living area for Sisters staffing the hospital. Record flooding in 2008 heavily damaged the building, which Mercy imploded in 2009.
- 1956: the Halls opened the Hall Radiation Center on Mercy property next to the hospital, to be operated by Mercy. In 1977, the Hall Foundation gifted the radiation center and the Hallmar nursing home to Mercy.
- 1959: Mercy opened another expansion to address overcrowding. This air-conditioned building was a six floor, L-shaped structure. It contained an expanded laboratory, labor and delivery rooms, eight operating rooms, a 200-person cafeteria and 100 additional beds.
- 1960: The Halls established Hallmar nursing home, a 26-bed facility on the Mercy campus. In 1967, Hallmar remodeled and expanded to 60 beds.
- March, 1971: Mercy opened the area's first trauma center.
- September, 1971: Mercy opened an eight-story acute-care tower.
- 1974: The hospital added three additional floors to the tower, for a total of nine above-ground and two basement levels.
- Late 1980s: Mercy built a Women's Center, enlarged the flower and gift shop and dedicated a new chapel off the main lobby.
- 2002: Mercy opened the Lundy Pavilion, enlarging the overall medical center by 25% and adding 500 stalls of more accessible parking.
- 2009: Mercy added the 8th & 8th medical office building, a four-story, 72,000-square-foot facility next to the hospital.
- 2012: Mercy opened the Hall-Perrine Cancer Center, a four-story, 86,000-square-feet facility with 27 infusion chairs or beds for chemotherapy and 16 exam rooms.

== Local competition ==
Mercy was the second hospital in Cedar Rapids, following St. Luke's establishment in 1884. The Cedar Rapids Gazette describes the relationship between the hospitals as, "shifting from cooperative to scrappy for decades." More recently, both Mercy and St. Luke's have faced competition from a local physician's group and from the University of Iowa Hospitals and Clinics.

=== St. Luke's ===
A mix of cooperation and competition stands as a defining element of both Mercy and St. Luke's. The two facilities are located only five blocks from each other, anchoring Cedar Rapids' MedQuarter District. The hospitals serve the Cedar Rapids metro area of about 260,000 people, plus seven nearby counties. The two hospitals actively compete for patients, both at the hospitals and at outpatient clinics. Mercy co-owns the MercyCare clinic chain with clinic physicians. These clinics and Mercy Medical Center's offerings compete with St. Luke's UnityPoint Health brand. Mercy and UnityPoint push each other to offer new services and provide better quality, followed by rounds of advertising promoting the services and achievements.

This competition began before Mercy opened its doors, with some St. Luke's supporters objecting to a second hospital. Others, however, said the city needed the new hospital because, "St. Luke's Hospital is full to overflowing, and that a young man who died there yesterday could only be given a cot in the aisle."

At some times, the hospitals have cooperated extensively. In the 1950s through at least part of the 1970s, the two hospitals coordinated on services to be offered. The facilities attempted to split service specialties in order to reduce costs. Mercy, for example, led local cancer treatment efforts, while St. Luke's led on inpatient psychiatric care. In addition, the hospitals ran joint fundraising campaigns in 1956 and 1969.

Even at these times, however, competition flared up. For example, Mercy opened the area's first trauma center in 1970. In 1971, Mercy's administrator, Sister Mary Lawrence, told a reporter, "she felt all that would be necessary at St. Luke's would be first aid treatment." St. Luke's however, was already planning on expanding its emergency service to have 24-hour coverage by attending physicians and soon after launched its own trauma center.

The two-hospital debate centers on cost, quality and religious mission.

Cost
Advocates on the different sides of the debate disagree about whether the two-hospital situation increases or decreases healthcare costs. A former St. Luke's administrator estimated merging could save $30 million per year. Others offer examples where competition between the hospitals has reduced costs to insurance companies and patients.

Quality
Competitive pressures also push the hospitals to improve services and win quality awards, which are then marketed aggressively. For example, both hospitals won recognition as top 100 hospitals during 2018 and previous years. In addition to the University of Iowa Hospitals, Mercy and St. Luke's are ranked as the best hospitals in Iowa. In some rankings, Mercy Medical Center ranks as the best in Iowa.

Religion
In addition to business-related competition, the religious foundations of the hospitals was an element for many years. Mercy was (and still is) a Catholic organization. The Grace Episcopal Church founded St. Luke's, then turned it over to the Methodist Church in 1923. St. Luke's later shifted away from Methodist ownership and is now owned by UnityPoint.

Mercy's desire to remain an independent, Catholic organization has blocked efforts to merge the two hospitals. St. Luke's leadership pushed for a merger at least as early as 1984. Mercy, however, declined merger proposals as recently as 2015, with Mercy leadership saying, "We have no intention of joining a large, multihospital system... because our main focus is providing exceptional patient care for the citizens and employers in the Cedar Rapids area." Mercy also has declined affiliation with larger Mercy health systems.

== Recent news ==
On June 13, 2008, flood waters in the hospital's basement and power outages forced Mercy to evacuate its patients to nearby facilities unaffected by the flood. Within a few days the water receded and the hospital began cleanup and repairs. Within a month, the hospital announced that it had fully recovered and all services were available.

In February, 2015, Mercy made international news when a dog traveled 20 blocks and entered the hospital, attempting to locate its hospitalized owner.
