= Xavier Hospital =

- Sisters of St. Francis

Geography
- Location: Dubuque, Dubuque County, Iowa, United States
- Coordinates: 42°31′46″N 90°40′7″W

Organization
- Care system: Private
- Type: Private community hospital
- Affiliated university: None

Services
- Beds: 132

History
- Closed: 1981

Links
- Lists: Hospitals in Iowa

Xavier Hospital was a hospital located in Dubuque, Iowa. It was located in the northern part of the city at the intersection of Windsor Avenue and Davis Street. With Finley Hospital and Mercy Hospital Xavier Hospital was one of three hospital facilities in the city of Dubuque.

== History ==
Opened in 1949, Xavier had 132 beds and was operated by the Franciscan Sisters of the Holy Family. The facility had Dubuque's first intensive-care unit and first recovery room and cared for Dubuque's polio victims in the months prior to the announcement of a vaccine. In 1974 the hospital was honored for its twenty-five year membership in the Catholic Hospital Association.

Xavier's census often exceeded 100%. Patients were "doubled-up" in rooms. Beds were occasionally placed in corridors as the hospital cared for polio victims in 1953-54.

In 1957 the hospital installed a radio receiving station which operated on a closed circuit frequency and had the call letters: W-E-L-L. The station provided day-long programming of the hospital's choice with an option of six commercial stations for patients use. W-E-L-L's own program included relaxing music, regular prayers, Holy Mass, and announcements. Xavier was thought to be the second hospital in Iowa to install such a station with the other in Sioux City.

The use of the hospital began to decline in 1965. This was clearly evident in 1979 when admissions dropped from 2,142 to 1,701 in the first six months. There were no layoffs, but hours were cut, and some vacant positions were not filled. In November 1981, the obstetrics department was the first to be closed.

In 1980 Dubuque was described by the Iowa Health Systems Agency as having thirty-two more hospital beds than necessary. The same year the Sisters of Mercy and the Sisters of St. Francis announced the merger of Xavier and Mercy hospitals. Xavier was to continue in operation with a combined management and no layoffs. Occupancy at Xavier, however, continued to decline. In November 1981, the last baby was delivered at the hospital.

Sister Helen Huewe was the CEO of Xavier in 1982 when it was closed one year after being purchased by Mercy Medical Center. In 1986 Mercy entered into a partnership with Arizona developer Alan Israel to renovate the building. Plans were made to convert the former hospital, at a cost of $8.5 million, into a retirement center complete with 163 apartments that would sell for between $30,000-$80,000, residential care floor, mini-mall, and performing arts center. By 1987 these plans had been dropped. The former hospital was saved from demolition in 1989 when Windsor Park Retirement Center was renovated by Kennedy Construction Company with the assistance of a City Council approved tax abatement arrangement. The grand opening was held on January 21 and 22, 1989. The first administrator of the center was Paul G. Gabrielson, the former administrator of Bethany Home for fifteen years.
