= MercyOne Dubuque Medical Center =

Coordinates: 42.493°N 90.675°W

Mercy Medical Center – Dubuque
- MercyOne

Geography
- Location: Dubuque, Iowa, United States

Organization
- Care system: Private, Not For Profit
- Type: District General
- Affiliated university: None

Services
- Emergency department: Level II trauma center
- Beds: 263

History
- Opened: 1879

Links
- Website: http://www.mercydubuque.com
- Lists: Hospitals in Iowa

See Mercy Hospital for other medical facilities with the Mercy name.

MercyOne Dubuque Medical Center (formerly Mercy Hospital) is a non-profit medical facility located in Dubuque, Iowa. It is one of two hospitals located in the city – the other being Finley Hospital. The hospital is based primarily in Dubuque, with a critical access hospital in Dyersville, Iowa. Mercy is located just to the north of U.S. Highway 20 on Mercy Drive.

The hospital is a member of MercyOne. Mercy has 263 beds in the Dubuque location, along with another 25 acute beds and a nursing home at the Dyersville location.

In 2005 a cardiology center was opened at the hospital. This new heart unit is used for both inpatient and outpatient procedures. Mercy moved its Psychiatric Services into a totally renovated area in 2009 and opened the region's only Autism Center in July, 2010.

== History ==
Mercy One traces its history back to when Bishop John Hennessy asked the Sisters of Mercy to establish a hospital in Dubuque. The Sisters established St. Joseph's Mercy Hospital on West Third Street near Bluff Street in Dubuque in 1879. One year later the Sisters acquired the land on which Mercy Hospital is currently located.

In 1885 St. Joseph's Sanitarium was opened on the edge of the city, becoming the first mental health facility in the area. The St. Anthony's Home for the Aged, which was built adjacent to the hospital, was opened in 1912. The main hospital was expanded in 1905. Then in 1947 another large 225 bed addition was built on to the hospital. When built, the new building represented the state of the art in equipment. Further additions and improvements followed, including another wing that was built in the 1970 and an expansion in 1997. New ICU and Cardiovascular units were opened in 2012.

The Sisters began the Mercy School of Nursing, and the first class of nurses graduated in 1902. The school was phased out when it merged with the Area One (now Northeast Iowa Community College) nursing program, and the last class graduated in 1975.

In 1976 the hospital became part of the Farmington Hills, Michigan based Mercy Health Services. In 1978 the Dyersville Community Hospital was merged with Mercy Hospital to provide a location in Dyersville. It then became known as Mercy Health Center. Xavier Hospital – which had operated as a third area hospital – was closed in 1981, and its operations were consolidated into the Mercy Health Center operations. The hospital was renamed to Mercy Medical Center in 1999 when Mercy Health Services and Holy Cross Health System combined operations to become Trinity Health in 2000.

== Awards and recognition ==
In 2004, Mercy was designated as a Magnet hospital, a national award for nursing. Mercy was re-designated as Magnet in 2009. Mercy is licensed by the state of Iowa and is accredited by the Joint Commission on Accreditation of Healthcare Organizations.

Mercy is recognized in the area for its emergency department. The trauma center is staffed by doctors who are all board certified in emergency medicine. The hospital's ER has been designated by the state of Illinois as a level II trauma center and as a recognized pediatric emergency department. The ER was recently refurbished and expanded. Improvements included ambulance bays so that patients could be transferred from ambulances to the hospital without being exposed to adverse weather. In addition to the Dubuque trauma center, the Dyersville facility also operates an emergency department.
