= Mercy Health =

Mercy Health may refer to:

== Health care providers ==
- Mercyhealth, serving Wisconsin and Illinois
- Mercy Health (Michigan), serving West Michigan
- Mercy Health (Ohio and Kentucky), based in Cincinnati, Ohio
- MercyOne (formerly Mercy Health Network), serving Iowa
- Mercy Health System, based in southeastern Pennsylvania, merged into Trinity Health Mid-Atlantic
- Mercy (healthcare organization), serving the St. Louis, Missouri area

== See also ==
- Mercy Health Plans, a Missouri-based insurer acquired by Coventry Health Care in 2010
- Atrium Health Mercy, a hospital in Charlotte, North Carolina
- Saint Joseph Mercy Health System, a health care provider in southeast Michigan
- Mercy College of Health Sciences, Des Moines, Iowa
- Mercy Hospital (disambiguation)
