= MedQuarter Regional Medical District =

Coordinates: 41.9786°N 91.6629°W

MedQuarter Regional Medical District MedQ
- Medical district
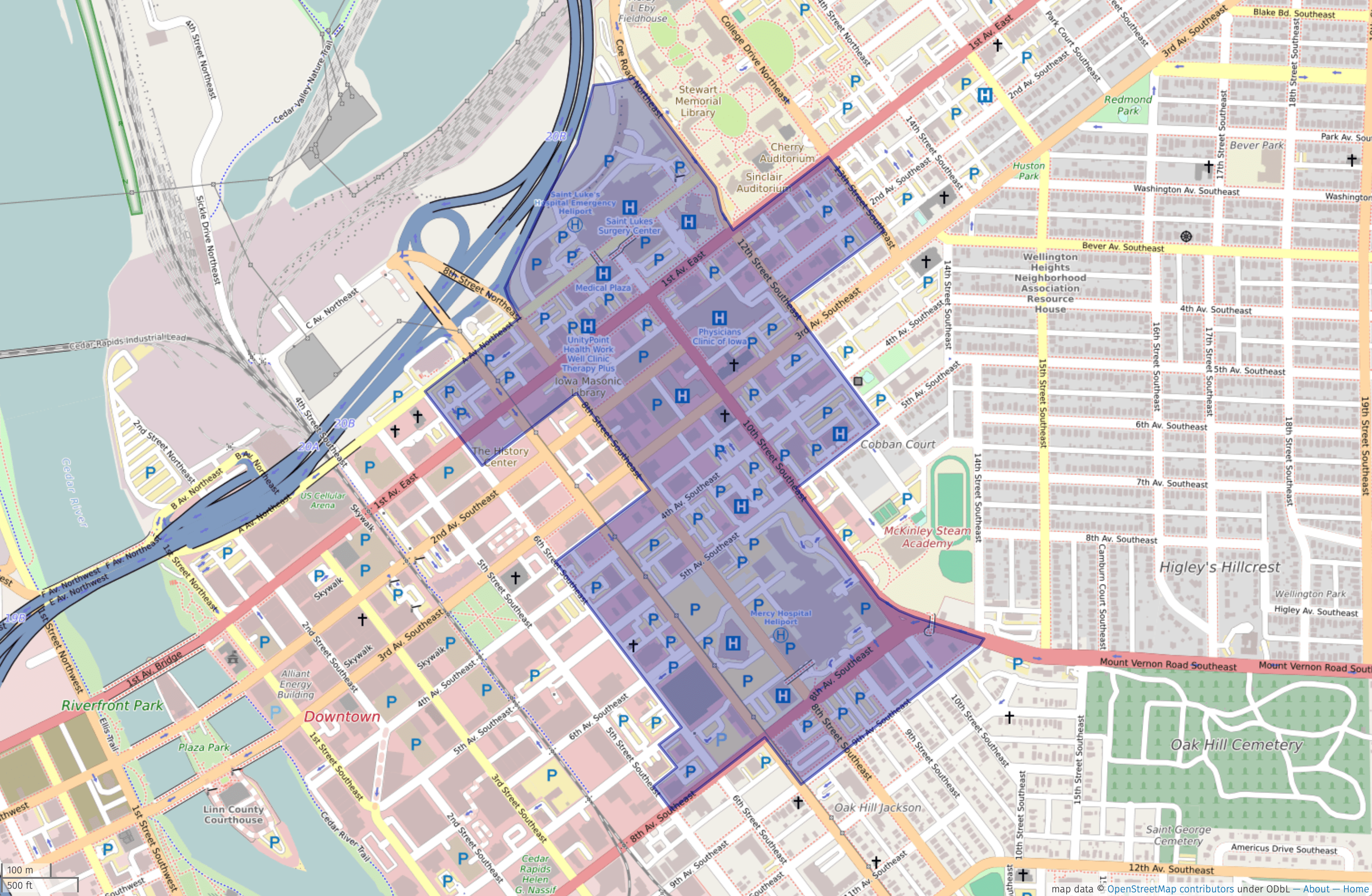
- Map of the MedQuarter (MedQ) Regional Medical District in downtown Cedar Rapids, Iowa.
- Interactive map of MedQuarter Regional Medical District
- Country: United States
- State: Iowa
- City: Cedar Rapids
- Established: 2011
- Time zone: UTC−06:00 (CST)
  - Summer (DST): UTC−05:00 (CDT)
- ZIP Code: 52401
- Area code: 319
- Website: TheMedQ.com

The MedQuarter Regional Medical District (MedQ) is a 55-square-block medical district located in downtown Cedar Rapids, Iowa. The district's initiative is to promote development within the medical community including its surrounding businesses and residential areas. The district includes 2 major hospitals (UnityPoint Health St. Luke's and Mercy Medical Center). MedQ also encompasses more than 500 physicians, surgeons, dentists, optometrists, and mid-level providers. For non-medical needs, there are over 50 other stores, restaurants, and professional offices in the area.

The MedQuarter was the result of Vision Cedar Rapids Downtown Framework Plan 2007 (JLG Plan) and the 2009 Neighborhood Planning Process, which developed districts to help grow downtown Cedar Rapids. Cedar Rapids has been recognized as a top ten city in the nation that delivers high-quality, low-cost healthcare by the Institute for Healthcare Improvement.
