= UnityPoint Health - St. Luke's =

Hospital in Sioux City, Iowa, U.S.

Coordinates: 42.518928°N 96.405716°W

- UnityPoint Health

Geography
- Location: 2720 Stone Park Blvd., Sioux City, Iowa, U.S.

Organisation
- Care system: Non-Profit
- Type: General
- Affiliated university: Iowa Health System

Services
- Standards: DNV accreditation
- Beds: 150

History
- Former name: St. Luke's Regional Medical Center
- Founded: 1966

Links
- Website: www.stlukes.org
- Other links: List of hospitals in Iowa

UnityPoint Health - St. Luke's is a full-service, non-profit hospital serving Sioux City, Iowa, United States, and residents in nearby communities in Iowa, South Dakota and Nebraska. The hospital is part of a larger health system which includes St. Luke’s Health Foundation, St. Luke’s College and a clinic network of family practice and specialty providers.

The 154 staffed-bed hospital employs a staff of over 1,200 employees plus a medical staff of 300. A volunteer workforce of 300 supplement care provided at St. Luke's. Each year, some 65,000 outpatients and nearly 9,000 inpatients are cared for at the hospital.

Approximately 2,000 babies are born at St. Luke's as of 2012.

In 2011, the hospital opened a new surgical services.

== History ==
St. Luke's roots can be traced back to Sioux City's first hospital, Samaritan, in the 1880s. Samaritan later merged with Methodist Hospital, and in the 1960s, Methodist and Lutheran Hospitals consolidated to form St. Luke's Regional Medical Center. St. Luke's new hospital was constructed at the corner of 27th and Stone Park Boulevard in Sioux City. Starting as a single acute-care hospital, St. Luke's grew to include a health system with St. Luke's College, St. Luke's Health Foundation and an entire clinic network. In addition, statewide efforts such as the Iowa Statewide Poison Control Center and My Nurse, a 24/7 health helpline, can trace their roots back to St. Luke's.

In 1995, St. Luke's joined a grassroots partnership with other Iowa hospitals to form Iowa Health System. Today, the organization is known as UnityPoint and is the fifth largest non-denominational health system in America. Through relationships with 25 hospitals in metropolitan and rural communities and more than 160 physician clinics, Iowa Health System provides care throughout Iowa and Illinois.
