= Wright Medical Center =

Iowa Specialty Hospitals & Clinics

Geography
- Location: Clarion, Iowa, United States
- Coordinates: 42.7207°N 93.7328°W

Organization
- Care system: US
- Type: Community

Services
- Emergency department: Level IV trauma center

Links
- Website: http://www.wrightmed.com
- Lists: Hospitals in Iowa

The Wright Medical Center is a hospital in Clarion, Iowa, United States.

== History ==
In the late 1940s, when "sufficient funds were present" to hire an architect, plans were designed, a site was donated and the Community Memorial Hospital was built. An editorial in the Monitor at the time stated this about the original building: "To say that Clarion's hospital is one of the finest structures we have ever seen is a gross understatement." Since that time, several major additions and renovations were completed in 1962, 1966, 1972, 1982, 1992 and in 1997 when Project Healthcare was completed and a new nine bed wing was opened. Community Memorial Hospital admitted its first patient on November 29, 1951.

On July 2, 1993. The Meadows independent retirement community was opened. Bob and Jane Davison donated the land where the Meadows is built. Bob Davison donated the land with his wife, Jane; Bob Kay brought the idea of an independent retirement facility to Clarion and then did much of the research on the project and Bob Eaton contributed design ideas along with Bob Orcutt.

In 2006 an addition was built at the south-east corner of the complex and the entire building was remodeled at a cost of $4.5 million. Also at that time an addition was built to the Meadows which houses an 18-unit assisted living facility. In 2010 an addition was built to the south housing new operating rooms.

In 2007, Wright Medical Center and Belmond Medical Center began collaboration by sharing administration, physicians and other ways to minimize the number of patients leaving Wright County for healthcare. In 2012 the two hospitals restructured and renamed themselves as Iowa Specialty Hospitals & Clinics, with main campuses in Clarion and Belmond. Additionally, a medical clinic was opened in Hampton, Iowa. Although the two hospitals are two separate organizations, the share administration and staff and seem to operate as one hospital.

== Summit Award ==
The Wright Medical Center was named a 2006 Summit Award Winner by the Press Ganey Associates. The award recognizes facilities that sustain the highest level of customer satisfaction for three or more consecutive years.
