= Buena Vista Regional Medical Center =

- Iowa Health System

Geography
- Location: Storm Lake, Buena Vista County, Iowa, United States
- Coordinates: 42.645°N 95.221°W

Services
- Emergency department: Yes
- Beds: 25

History
- Founded: 1951

Links
- Website: www.bvrmc.org
- Lists: Hospitals in Iowa

Buena Vista Regional Medical Center (BVRMC), formerly Buena Vista County Hospital, is a 25-bed rural critical access hospital located in Storm Lake, Iowa. BVRMC is an accredited facility that has been providing care to patients since 1951. BVRMC is a public hospital that has over 80 inpatient and outpatient services and over 20 specialty clinics. They employ over 400 individuals from 47 different communities.

== Awards ==
- 2023 Women’s Choice Award as one of America’s Best Hospitals for Obstetrics
- 2023 Women’s Choice Award as One of America’s Best Hospitals for Patient Experience
- 2022 American Heart Association’s Mission: Lifeline EMS Gold Recognition Award
- 2022 Women’s Choice Award as One of America’s Best Hospitals for Obstetrics
- 2022 Becker’s Hospital Review List for Best Hospitals for Patient Experience in the Midwest
- 2021 Top Workplaces Award Winner
- 2021 American Heart Association’s Mission: Lifeline EMS Silver Plus Recognition Award
- 2021 Women’s Choice Award® as One of America’s Best Hospitals for Obstetrics
- 2021 American Nurse Journal Honorable Mention for Med/Surgical Unit
- Governor’s Volunteer Award for 25 Years of Outstanding Commitment and Service to the SHIIP Program
- 5 CMS Stars for Patient Experience, 2020
- 2020 Press Ganey Guardian of Excellence Award
- 2020 American Heart Association’s Mission: Lifeline EMS Silver Plus Recognition Award
- 2020 HFMA’s MAP Award for High Performance in Revenue Cycle
- National Recognition for Excellence in Financial Interactions with Patients, 2020
- 2020 BVRMC Medical-Surgical Unit Receives AMSN PRISM Award® for Exemplary Practice
- 2020 Women’s Choice Award® as One of America’s Best Hospitals for Obstetrics
- BVRMC SHIIP Program Receives Governor’s Volunteer Award
- 2019 Top Workplaces Award Winner
- 2019 Women’s Choice Award® as One of America’s Best Hospitals for Obstetrics
- 2018 Top Workplaces Award Winner
- Dr. Richard Lampe - IHA Excellence in Governance Award, 2018
- Casey Orth-Nebitt - Emerging Leader Award, 2017
- Joni Boese - Wound, Ostomy & Continence Nurse of the Year Award for Iowa Affiliate of the WOCN Society, 2017
- 2016 Top Workplaces Award Winner
- Leadership and Culture of Safety Award - Iowa Healthcare Collaborative
- 2015 Press Ganey Guardian of Excellence Award
- 2009 Best Places To Work Award- Modern Healthcare
- 2005 Press Ganey Compass Award for Outstanding Performance Improvement.

Since 2007, 14 Hospital Hero Awards from the Iowa Hospital Association

Since 2006, 29 nurses awarded the honor of 100 Great Iowa Nurses
