= UnityPoint Health - St. Luke's Hospital - Cedar Rapids =

Coordinates: 41.985°N 91.660°W

- UnityPoint Health

Geography
- Location: Cedar Rapids, Iowa, United States

Services
- Emergency department: Level III trauma center
- Beds: 532

History
- Former name: St. Luke's Hospital
- Founded: May 7, 1884

Links
- Website: https://www.unitypoint.org/locations/unitypoint-health---st-lukes-hospital
- Lists: Hospitals in Iowa

UnityPoint Health - St. Luke's Hospital - Cedar Rapids is a 532-bed hospital in Cedar Rapids, Iowa. It was founded in 1884 as Cedar Rapids’ first hospital and is now one of two hospitals in Cedar Rapids, the other being Mercy Medical Center. St. Luke's emergency department treats over 55,000 patients each year and the most cases of trauma in Iowa. This has led to a partnership with the University of Iowa Hospitals and Clinics for training future ER doctors. It is the area's only Level III Regional Neonatal Intensive Care Unit. St. Luke's provides a Level III trauma center.

== History ==
In 1881 a critically injured homeless man who was unable to get care in Cedar Rapids inspired a local Episcopal minister to act. The following Sunday, the Rev. Samuel Ringgold made an impassioned plea for a hospital, "a real hospital, so that citizens and strangers alike can be cared for." The next day he and his flock began soliciting donations. Within months, work began on St. Luke's.

== 2008 flooding ==
St. Luke's Hospital was one of the buildings in Downtown Cedar Rapids that didn't sustain any damage from the Iowa Flood of 2008. Some patients from Mercy Medical Center were transferred to St. Luke's Hospital when Mercy had to be evacuated because of flood damage there.
