= UnityPoint Health - Iowa Methodist Medical Center =

- UnityPoint Health

Geography
- Location: Des Moines, Iowa, United States
- Coordinates: 41°35′17″N 93°38′02″W

Services
- Emergency department: Level I Adult Trauma Center / Level II Pediatric Trauma Center
- Beds: 370

Helipads
- Helipad: FAA LID: IA64

History
- Former name: Iowa Methodist Medical Center
- Opened: 1901

Links
- Website: www.unitypoint.org/desmoines/iowa-methodist-medical-center.aspx
- Lists: Hospitals in Iowa

UnityPoint Health - Iowa Methodist Medical Center is a non-profit, 370-bed hospital in Des Moines, Iowa owned and operated by UnityPoint Health.

== History ==
Iowa Methodist Medical Center originally opened on January 16, 1901, as Iowa Methodist Hospital, a 30-bed hospital on the former site of Callanan College. In 1956, the hospital performed the first open-heart procedure outside of the Mayo Clinic and also built the first radiation therapy department in Des Moines. Iowa Methodist began operating Life Flight, an air ambulance service, in 1979. The John Stoddard Cancer Center opened in the early 1990s, combining full radiation, oncology, and associated treatments into a single location.

== Facilities ==
The hospital is home to the William C. Knapp Emergency Department and Trauma Center, an American College of Surgeons-verified Level I trauma center and Level II pediatric trauma center. The hospital houses the Blank Children's Hospital, which contains a pediatric intensive care unit (PICU) and a level III neonatal intensive care unit (NICU). The hospital is also home to the Iowa Methodist Transplant Center, which performs kidney transplants.
