= Mercy Hospital for Women, Melbourne =

Mercy Hospital for Women
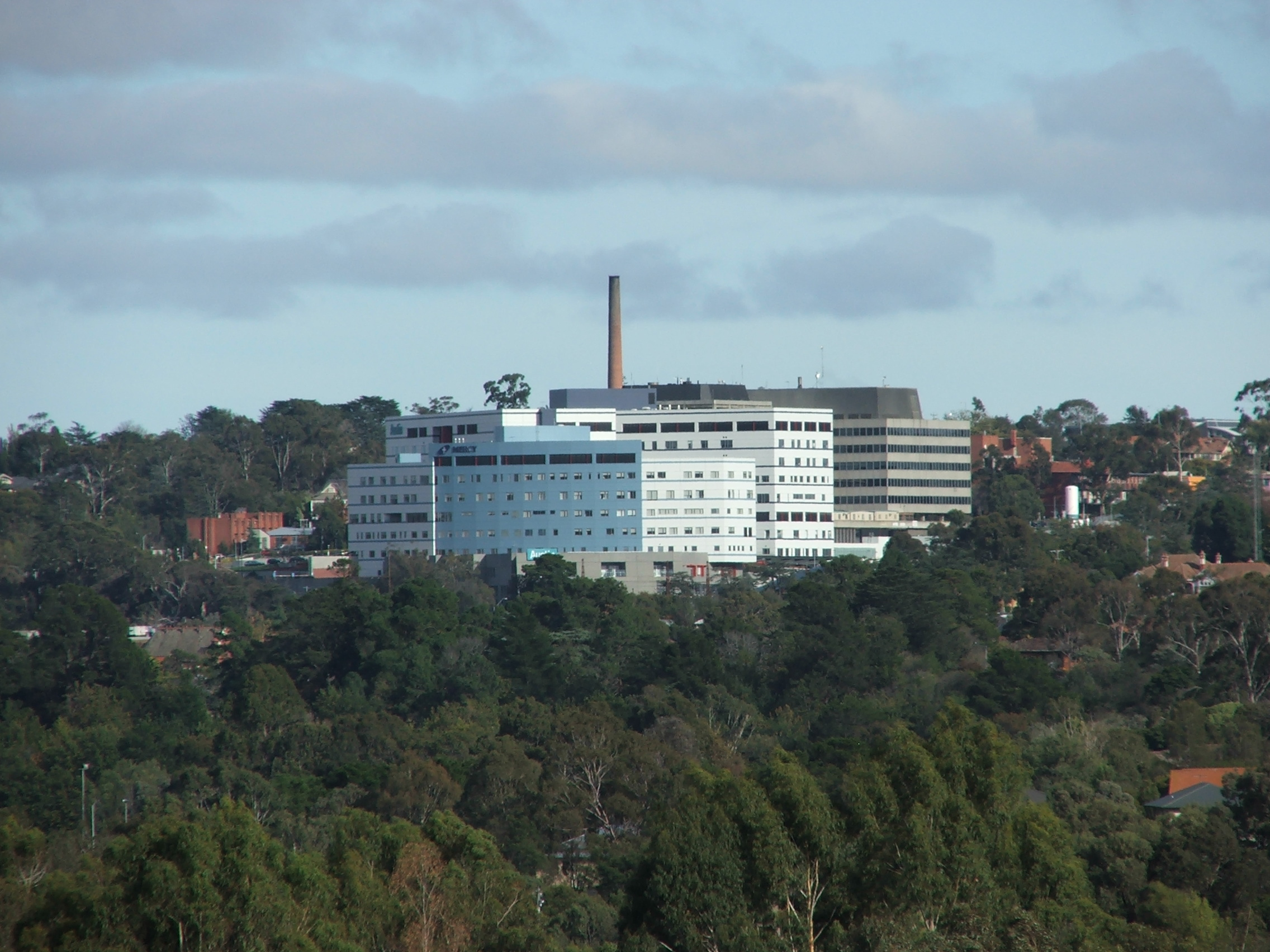
- The Mercy and adjoining Austin Hospitals

Geography
- Location: Melbourne suburb of Heidelberg, Victoria, Australia
- Coordinates: 37°45′22″S 145°03′40″E

Organisation
- Affiliated university: University of Melbourne

Services
- Beds: 229

History
- Opened: 1934

Links
- Lists: Hospitals in Australia

See Mercy Hospital for other medical facilities with the Mercy name.

Mercy Hospital for Women, is based in Heidelberg adjacent to the Austin Hospital. The hospital offers obstetric, gynaecological and neonatal services, including a neonatal intensive care unit and special care nursery. The hospital was opened in 1934.

Mercy Hospital for Women provides both public and private patient care through maternity services, neonatology and paediatrics, perioperative services, specialist and sub-specialist gynaecology, women's health and associated health, support and diagnostic services. It is a major teaching hospital and specialist referral centre.

The hospital is affiliated with the University of Melbourne's Clinical School of the Department of Obstetrics and Gynaecology and La Trobe University School of Midwifery and Neonatal Nursing. The hospital is administered by Mercy Health, a Catholic not-for-profit organisation founded by the Sisters of Mercy.
