= St. Luke's Hospital (Davenport, Iowa) =

- St. Luke’s Hospital
- U.S. National Register of Historic Places
- Davenport Register of Historic Properties
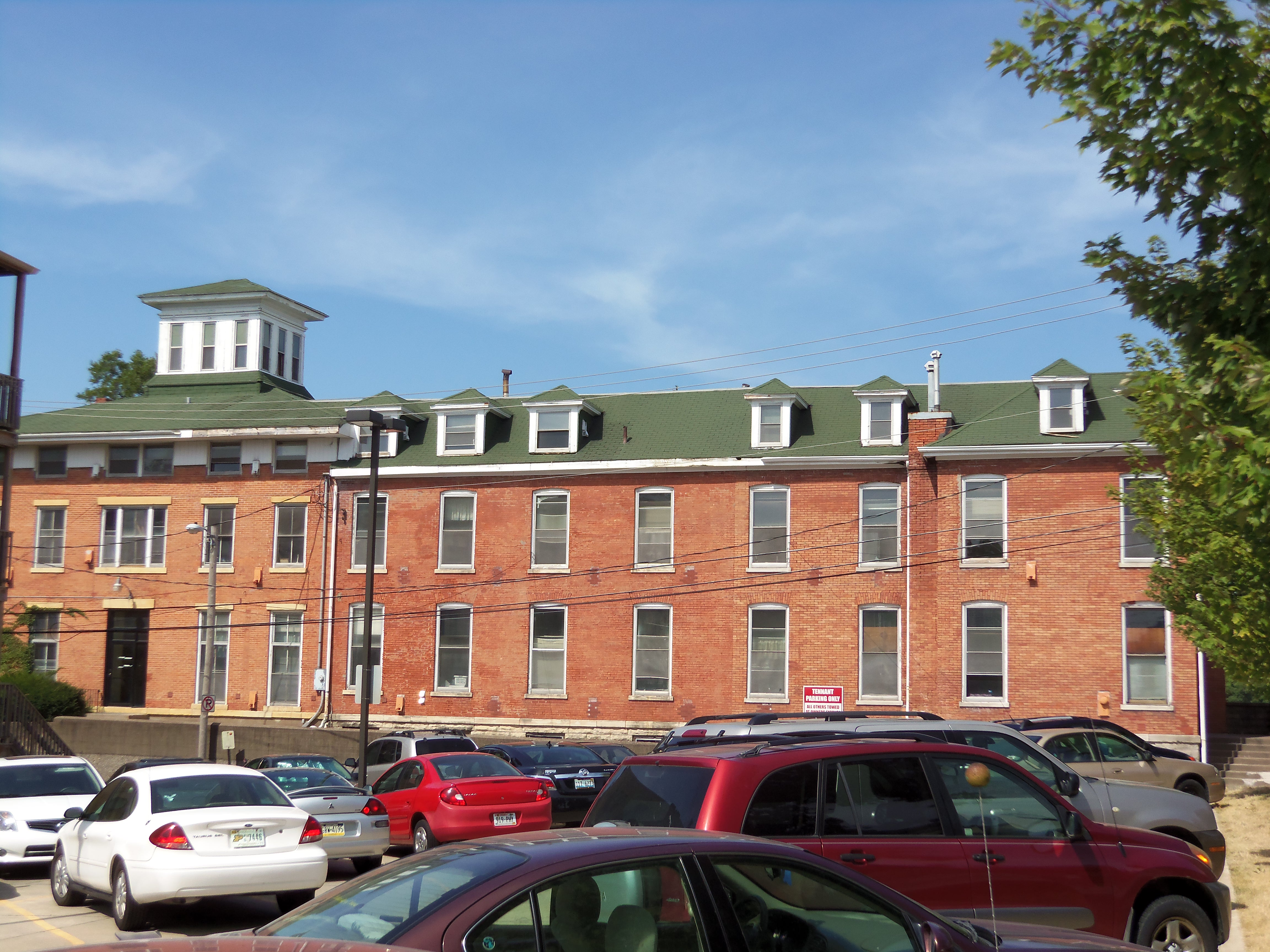

- Location within Iowa Location within the United States
- Location: 121 W. 8th St. Davenport, Iowa
- Coordinates: 41°31′40″N 90°34′30″W
- Area: less than one acre
- Built: 1850
- Architectural style: Italianate
- MPS: Davenport MRA
- NRHP reference No.: 83002511
- DRHP No.: 26

Significant dates
- Added to NRHP: July 7, 1983
- Designated DRHP: February 3, 1999

St. Luke's Hospital was a hospital building on a bluff overlooking downtown Davenport, Iowa, United States. It is listed on the Davenport Register of Historic Properties and the National Register of Historic Places. It has subsequently been torn down.

== History ==
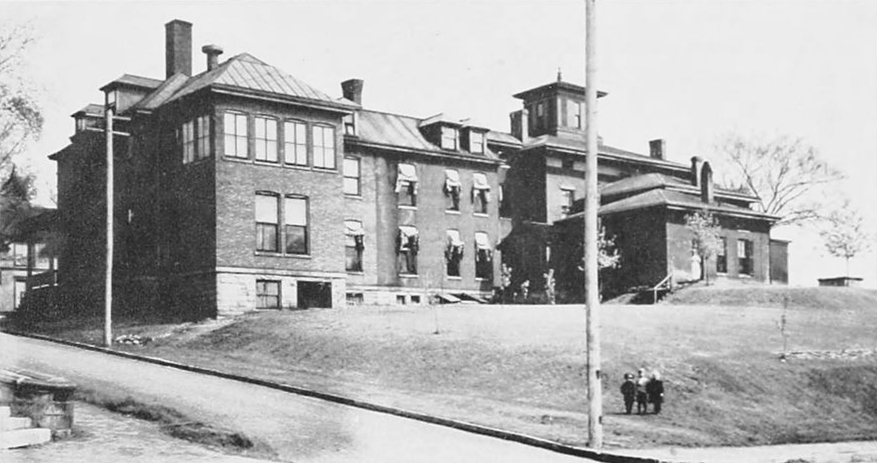
The original St. Luke's Hospital building after 1903.

In 1892, the Rt. Rev. William Stevens Perry, the second Bishop of Iowa proposed the establishment of a hospital in Davenport. The diocese had previously started hospitals in Des Moines (1878) and in Cedar Rapids (1884). Funding for the new hospital in Davenport came from money left in an account for the defunct Iowa Christian Home, which amounted to $10,176.45. With the money, the Trustees of the Iowa Christian Home purchased the Daniel Newcomb residence on Eighth Street. A 20-bed hospital was created after spending $1,600 to remodel the house. St. Luke's Hospital formally opened on April 30, 1885. A few years later (the exact date is in dispute), an addition that tripled the building's size was constructed on the north side of the old house.

Of the 22-member Board of Managers for the hospital, 13 members were women, with Mrs. Walter Chambers serving as its first president. Women would serve as the hospital's chief officer until 1946.

St. Luke's was the city's second hospital after Mercy Hospital, which was founded by the Sisters of Mercy of the Catholic Church in 1869. St. Luke's was meant as an emergency facility to complement Mercy, which was a long-term care faculty. The operating room for the hospital was on the second floor. The day's weather determined if surgery would be held on any given day. If it was sunny there was enough light and surgery would proceed. If it was overcast, surgery had to be postponed. Doctors and nurses did not wear surgical masks and a relative of the patient was allowed into the room during surgery in street clothes.

The Davenport Training School for Nurses was begun at the hospital on August 27, 1895, and changed its name to St. Luke's Hospital Training School two years later. In 1903 the hospital added space for an additional 50 patients as well as modern operating rooms. By 1909 the hospital was treating 356 patients. Changes in the operating rooms included doctors and nurse wearing surgical gowns, gloves and the instruments were sterilized. The fee for major surgery had doubled to $10 from the 1895 rate.

The hospital became a charter member of the American Hospital Association in 1918. It also expanded the same year by building a new facility at Bridge and High Streets. The Eighth Street location was abandoned when the new hospital opened in December 1919. The old building was converted to apartments. Major expansions occurred at the hospital in the 1950s, 1960s, and 1980s. St. Luke's worked toward consolidating with Mercy Hospital in 1975 and 1976, but in the end, they remained separate. Finally, in 1993 it was decided to merge the two hospitals. On May 24, 1994 Genesis Health System was created.

This building remained an apartment building, with 28 units, into the 21st century. It was acquired by Palmer College of Chiropractic and torn down in 2017.

== Architecture ==
The Daniel Newcomb House, which became St. Luke's Hospital, was built in the Italianate style in 1850. It is built of red brick with a shallow hipped roof, bracketed eaves, and a belvedere on the top of the roof. The 1903 addition was built to complement the older building. The pitch of the roof, however, is steeper and it includes dormers at various points. It is also a little simpler in design without the bracketed eaves. The T-plan wing nearly tripled the available floor space, and at the same time the house probably lost many of its notable exterior features.
