= UnityPoint Health - Meriter =

Hospital in Madison, Wisconsin, U.S.

- UnityPoint Health
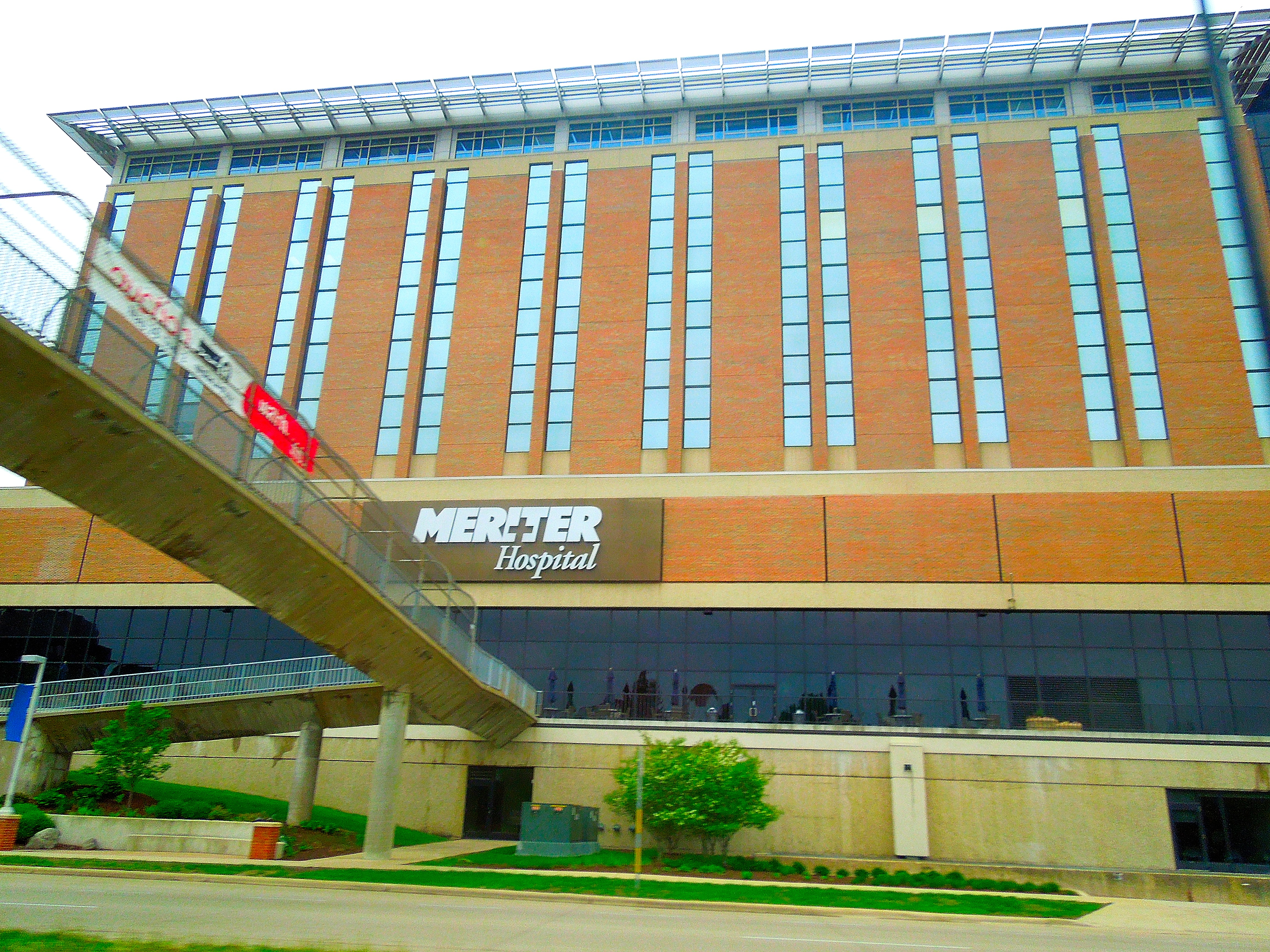

Geography
- Location: 202 South Park Street, Madison, Wisconsin, United States
- Coordinates: 43°03′57″N 89°24′05″W

Organization
- Care system: Private hospital
- Type: General Hospital and Teaching hospital
- Affiliated university: University of Wisconsin School of Medicine and Public Health

Services
- Standards: DNV Healthcare
- Emergency department: Level IV Trauma Center
- Beds: 448

Helipads
- Helipad: WI93
| Number | Length | | Surface |
| Number | ft | m | Surface |
|---|---|---|---|
| H1 | 108 | 33 | Concrete |

History
- Former names: Madison General Hospital; Meriter Hospital
- Founded: 1889

Links
- Website: https://www.unitypoint.org/locations/unitypoint-health---meriter-hospital
- Lists: Hospitals in the United States

Meriter Hospital Inc., doing business as UnityPoint Health - Meriter, is a non-profit hospital campus in Madison, Wisconsin, United States that is owned by UnityPoint Health. The medical facility is a tertiary, psychiatric hospital and teaching hospital that has multiple specialties.

== History ==
Madison General Hospital was founded in 1898. The hospital merged with Madison Methodist Hospital in 1987, creating Meriter Health Services.

On October 10, 2013, the board of Meriter Health System agreed to merge with UnityPoint Health. In early January 2014, Meriter Hospital became part of UnityPoint Health and two years later it was rebranded to UnityPoint Health - Meriter. On April 11, 2017, the Federal Trade Commission approved a joint venture between UnityPoint Health - Meriter and UW Health. On July 11, they expanded their partnership by treating patients together.

On May 27, 2025, at about 6:30 a.m. 950 nurses at UnityPoint Health - Meriter went on strike for better safety, more money, and for more nurses. This is the first nurses strike in the history of the medical facility. On June 1, they returned to work after the Services Employee International Union Wisconsin had signed a new two-year contract with the hospital to increase their pay by ten percent and to purchase a metal detector. On October 17, firefighters responded to a 911 call from the hospital at 8:09 p.m.; they found smoke in a mechanical room on the fifth floor and put out a fire on the roof.

== Facilities ==
The Madison Japanese Language School (マディソン日本語補習校 Madison Nihongo Hoshūkō), a Japanese weekend supplementary school, holds classes at the hospital's McConnel Hall.

Physicians Plus, a regional health insurer, is owned by Meriter.
