= Roy J. Carver Charitable Trust =

The Roy J. Carver Charitable Trust is a philanthropic group dedicated to the state of Iowa and, to a lesser extent, Illinois. It disburses about $15M annually. Most of the funding is directed to education and to biomedical research. The Roy J. and Lucille A. Carver College of Medicine is supported by this foundation.
