= Werribee Mercy Hospital =

Coordinates: 37°54′25″S 144°39′09″E

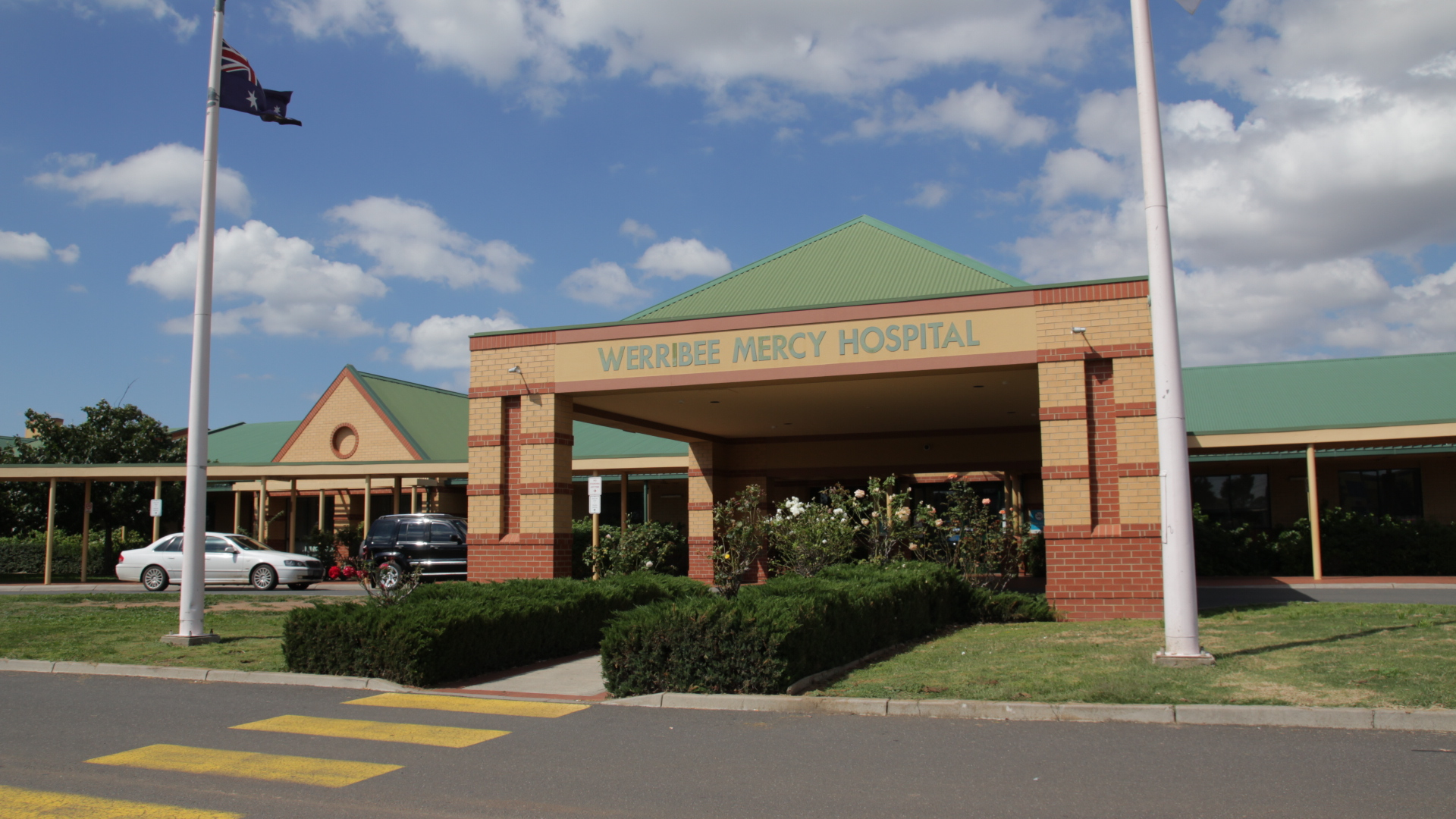
- Werribee Mercy Hospital

Geography
- Location: Werribee, Victoria on the Princes Highway

Services
- Emergency department: 24 Hours

History
- Founded: January 1994

See Mercy Hospital for other medical facilities with the Mercy name.

Werribee Mercy Hospital, located in Werribee, Victoria on the Princes Highway, about 25 km west of Melbourne, is a public general hospital providing a broad range of services which include surgical, maternity, obstetric care, orthopaedic, ENT, paediatric surgeries, GI oscopy, dialysis, emergency, mental health, aged and palliative care, allied health services and a 24-hour emergency department. As part of the Werribee Mercy Mental Health Program the hospital offers a range of acute and community psychiatric services.

The hospital opened in January 1994 and has rapidly expanded to cope with the expanding population in Melbourne's fast-growing western suburbs. The hospital has nearly finished a $93 million expansion including 56 additional beds, six operating theatres and eight critical care beds, funded by the Victorian Government.

The hospital is administered by Mercy Health, a Catholic not for profit organisation founded by the Sisters of Mercy.

== Media ==
The hospital was often depicted as the 'Mount Thomas Hospital' in the popular local police drama Blue Heelers.
