= WinnMed =

- Mayo Clinic Health System

Geography
- Location: Decorah, Winneshiek County, Iowa, United States
- Coordinates: 43.29473°N 91.77377°W

Organization
- Type: Community hospital

Services
- Beds: 25

History
- Former names: Smith Memorial Hospital, Decorah Hospital, Winneshiek County Memorial Hospital, Winneshiek Medical Center
- Opened: 1914

Links
- Website: www.winnmed.org
- Lists: Hospitals in Iowa

WinnMed, known as Winneshiek Medical Center until June 2023, is a 25-bed not-for-profit hospital located in Decorah, Iowa. WinnMed is the second largest critical access hospital in Iowa. WinnMed provides the most comprehensive and specialized health care services in the region.

== History ==
In the early 1900s, the Reverend Paul Koren began collecting donations for a hospital in Decorah, Iowa. William Smith gave the first donation of $10,000, and several other donors provided Koren another $15,000. The Decorah Hospital opened in 1914.

In 1957, the Decorah Hospital was renamed Smith Memorial Hospital in honor of its first donor. In 1971, a new hospital building was constructed, and the name was changed to Winneshiek County Memorial Hospital. The old building was donated to Winneshiek County.

In 2004, the board of trustees changed the hospital's name to Winneshiek Medical Center. In 2005, Mayo Clinic Health System's Decorah clinic merged with Winneshiek Medical Center. As part of that merger, Mayo Clinic Health System provided physician services for the hospital.

In 2023, Winneshiek Medical Center was renamed WinnMed. This name continued to honor Winneshiek County roots while expanding the connection to the broader region.

In 2024, Transforming Tomorrow, a $50 million expansion and growth project. The project included a fully renovated Obstetrics unit, expanded and remodeled surgery suites and doubling the size of the medical clinic.

In 2025, a new agreement was established between Mayo Clinic Health System and WinnMed. The updated agreement provides the framework for Mayo Clinic Health System-Decorah Clinic Physicians (MCHS-DCP) to continue to provide healthcare services at WinnMed in Decorah, but there will be no expansion to the MCHS-DCP practice beyond the current team. New physicians being recruited will be brought in as WinnMed employees directly or through a partnership with another healthcare entity. With an active medical staff of over 35 WinnMed, Mayo Clinic Health System and Emplify Health by Gundersen physicians, and clinics in Decorah, Ossian and Mabel, Minnesota, WinnMed is the largest and most specialized hospital in the region.

== Medical operations ==
WinnMed operates six clinics in Decorah, Cresco, Calmar, and Ossian in Iowa, and Mabel, Spring Grove in Minnesota. They also provide student health services to Luther College in Decorah. In 2025, WinnMed announced the acquisition of a da Vinci 5 Robotic Surgical System. This state-of-the-art technology brings advanced, minimally invasive procedures to patients in northeast Iowa, southeast Minnesota and surrounding communities.

== Recognition ==
In 2016, the National Rural Health Association named WinnMed a Top 20 Critical Access Hospital in the nation. In 2026, WinnMed was named a Top Workplace by USA today. Additionally, WinnMed has earned The Joint Commission Gold Seal of Approval® for accreditation.
