= MercyOne Des Moines Medical Center =

Coordinates: 41.599°N 93.623°W

- MercyOne Network

Geography
- Location: 1111 6th Avenue, Des Moines, Polk County, Iowa, United States

Services
- Standards: Chest Pain Center, Stroke Center
- Emergency department: Level II Adult Trauma Center / Level II Pediatric Trauma Center
- Beds: 875

History
- Founded: 1893

Links
- Website: https://www.mercyone.org/desmoines
- Lists: Hospitals in Iowa

MercyOne Des Moines Medical Center, formally called Mercy Medical Center – Des Moines, is a not-for-profit Catholic hospital located in Des Moines, Iowa. MercyOne Des Moines was founded by the Sisters of Mercy in 1893 and is the longest continually operating hospital in Des Moines. MercyOne is a member of MercyOne Network, a partnership of Catholic Health Initiatives (CHI) and Trinity Health. MercyOne Des Moines is one of the largest employers in the state of Iowa with more than 5,300 employees, and 800 physicians and allied health associates. The main campus has a 656-bed acute care facility.

== Notable events ==
On November 29, 1979, Liberato Iannone M.D., a cardiologist with the Iowa Heart Center, performed the first percutaneous coronary angioplasty in the state of Iowa at Mercy Medical Center. Later at the hospital, Dr. Iannone became the first cardiologist to perform a directional coronary arthrectomy.

== Graduate medical education ==
MercyOne Des Moines Medical Center hosts several ACGME-accredited residency programs:

- Internal Medicine
- Family Medicine
- Psychiatry
- General surgery.

An ACGME-accredited cardiology fellowship has accepted its first class of fellows, who will begin their program in July 2019.

Residencies are also offered in pharmacy (Emergency or Infectious Disease tracks) and nursing. Those with interest in hospital administration are able to apply to an administrative fellowship, which has had four fellows as of 2018.

== Associated centers and institutes ==
- Iowa Diabetes and Endocrinology Center
- Iowa Heart Center
- MercyOne Heart Rhythm Center
- MercyOne Neuroscience Center

== Accreditations and designations ==
- Gold Seal of Approval by the Joint Commission
- Primary Stroke Center since 2007 by the Joint Commission
- Level II Trauma Center by the American College of Surgeons

== Planned campus expansion ==
In 2016, MercyOne Des Moines Medical Center announced a $500 million expansion plan that would demolish the nearby Mercy Park Apartments to make way for several new parking structures. Additionally, a new 11-story tower is planned on the southeast side of the existing campus. As of March 2019, the Mercy Park Apartments had been demolished, and a planned parking structure on the southwest side of the campus has been completed. A second parking structure and central plant expansion on the west side of the campus is nearing completion. An additional parking expansion is planned on the northeast corner of the campus at the site of the former apartment complex. Although extensive renovations to the existing building have occurred since the announcement, construction has not yet started on the planned 11-story hospital tower anticipated on the southeast corner of the complex.

== Leadership ==
In November 2017, it was announced that Karl Keeler would succeed Robert P. Ritz as CEO and President of Mercy Medical Center Des Moines, with direct oversight to the main Mercy Campus and three other area hospitals. He assumed the role in January 2018. Mr Ritz left the role he had held since 2013 to become president of the West Des Moines, Iowa-based Mercy Health Network, which was renamed MercyOne in February 2019.

== See also ==
- MercyOne
- Mercy College of Health Sciences
