= UnityPoint Health - Allen Hospital =

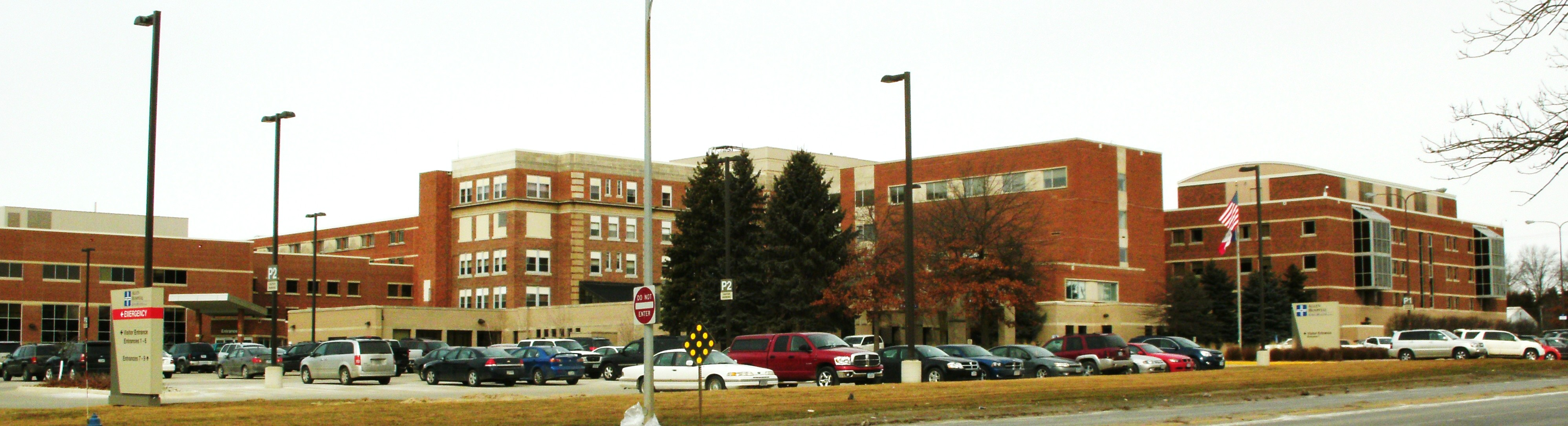
- The Allen Hospital in February 2011

Organisation
- Care system: Community

Services
- Beds: 204

UnityPoint Health - Allen Hospital is a 204-bed, not-for-profit community hospital serving the Cedar Valley in Waterloo, Iowa. It is the busiest hospital in the valley. Allen Hospital is an affiliate hospital of UnityPoint Health, which cares for one of every three patients in Iowa.

== Services ==
The hospital features a cardiac care unit, which performs about 250 open heart procedures per year. The hospital features a Level II neonatal nursery and delivers more than 1,000 babies a year. It has invested $1.4 million on the Da Vinci Surgical System in order to reduce costs and surgical wait times.
