= Achih H. Chen =

American plastic surgeon

- Citizenship: United States of America
- Education: University of Iowa
- Occupations: Facial plastic surgeon, Researcher, Professor

Achih H. Chen is an American facial plastic surgeon, researcher, and academic. He is best known for his development of the facial cosmetic surgical technique, the "Total Face Rejuvenation," a multi-plane facial surgery method for which he appeared on The Doctors. He is also known for the development of a streamlined technique of creating dynamic facial dimples to mimic naturally occurring dimples. Prior to his work in facial plastic surgery, Chen contributed to early foundational molecular genetics research that mapped the chromosomal locations of specific forms of hereditary hearing loss.

== Early life and education ==
Chen grew up in Ames, Iowa, where he graduated from Ames High School in 1986. He attended the University of Iowa, graduating in 1990 and receiving a Bachelor of Science in physics with a minor in Mathematics. Chen earned his medical degree from the University of Iowa College of Medicine in 1995 and subsequently completed his residency in Otolaryngology-Head and Neck Surgery at the University of Iowa. During his residency, Chen also completed an NIH post-doctoral research fellowship and was the recipient of the McCabe Research Award. He completed his surgical subspecialty fellowship training in Facial Plastic and Reconstructive Surgery in Beverly Hills, California at the Lasky Clinic, a UCLA-affiliated center.

== Medical and academic career ==
From 2003 until 2015, Chen served as the Director of Facial Plastic and Reconstructive Surgery at the Medical College of Georgia in Augusta, Georgia. He has remained active in medical education as a Clinical Professor, continuing to train physicians in facial plastic surgery to the present day. Currently, he is the director of The Georgia Center of Facial Plastic Surgery.

Chen is also actively involved in medical credentialing and oversight. He has served as an Oral Examiner for the Facial Plastic Surgery Section of the American Board of Otolaryngology-Head and Neck Surgery (part of the American Board of Medical Specialties) and has served a three-year term as a member of the board's Task Force for New Materials.

== Surgical innovations ==
Chen has developed and published multiple surgical techniques to enhance outcome and reduce healing time following cosmetic facial surgery.

=== The Total Face Rejuvenation ===
Chen is credited with developing the "Total Face Rejuvenation," a technique that involves simultaneous surgery in three distinct facial tissue planes, combined with ablative laser resurfacing. The approach was designed to address multiple layers of facial aging comprehensively in a single procedure. The technique was published in the American Journal of Cosmetic Surgery and subsequently featured on the syndicated medical talk show The Doctors.

=== Dimpleplasty ===
Chen developed a streamlined surgical approach known as dimpleplasty to create dynamic facial dimples, dimples that appear only with facial movement, simulating naturally occurring anatomy. He and his colleagues detailed their experience and clinical results using this technique in a publication in the American Journal of Cosmetic Surgery.

=== Fibrin glue clinical trials ===
Chen served as a member of a team of principal investigators in phase 2 and 3 clinical trials utilizing fibrin glue in facelift procedures. The trials demonstrated that the use of fibrin glue significantly decreased postoperative bleeding and bruising, resulting in fewer complications and accelerated patient recovery times.

=== Genetic research ===
Early in his medical career, Chen was involved in molecular genetic research focusing on the basis of hereditary hearing loss.

==== Mapping DFNA4 ====
In 1995, Chen was part of a research team that performed foundational genetic studies on DFNA4, an autosomal dominant form of hearing loss. The team mapped the responsible gene to chromosome 19q13

==== TECTA gene mutations ====
In 1998, Chen collaborated on a study that discovered mutations in the human TECTA gene, which encodes the α-tectorin protein, are directly linked to dominant (DFNA8/12) and recessive (DFNB21) forms of hereditary hearing loss. By studying affected Belgian and Austrian families, the researchers identified missense mutations that replaced highly conserved amino acid residues within the zona pellucida (ZP) domain of α-tectorin.
