= UnityPoint Health - Trinity Regional Medical Center =

Coordinates: 42.492°N 94.192°W

- Iowa Health System

Geography
- Location: Fort Dodge, Webster County, Iowa, United States of America

Organisation
- Care system: Private
- Type: Community Hospital
- Affiliated university: None

Services
- Standards: DNV Healthcare
- Emergency department: Regional Referral Center
- Beds: 200

History
- Former name: Trinity Regional Medical Center
- Founded: 1908

Links
- Website: https://www.unitypoint.org/fortdodge/
- Other links: List of hospitals in Iowa

UnityPoint Health - Trinity Regional Medical Center (TRMC) is a regional medical center located in Fort Dodge, Iowa. The hospital has 200 licensed beds, and in addition provides support to a number of smaller hospitals in northwest Iowa. The hospital is affiliated with UnityPoint Health.

TRMC provides emergency, obstetrical, pediatric, general medical, and intensive care services as well as an outpatient surgical service. Previously TRMC also had a psychiatric department, however a lack of physicians forced the hospital to close the department.

In August 2024 TRMC announced it would open an outpatient cardiovascular care center on October 28, 2024.
