= John Stoddard Cancer Center =

Coordinates: 41.590100°N 93.635054°W

John Stoddard Cancer Center is a cancer care center located in Central Iowa. It was the first cancer center in that location.

The John Stoddard Cancer Center is a part of Iowa Health-Des Moines, where a number of important treatment options and services originated.

== History ==
Iowa’s first children’s cancer center opened at Blank Children's Hospital in 1987, concentrating on all phases of pediatric cancer diagnosis and treatment in one area. Expanding upon that concept in 1991, the John Stoddard Cancer Center opened at the Iowa Methodist Medical Center. It was the first cancer center in central Iowa to house all radiation oncology and ancillary services in one location. The new facility centralized all outpatient oncology services in one area while locating them by the inpatient services offered at Iowa Methodist Medical Center.

In 1962, Iowa Methodist Medical Center established Iowa’s first hospital-based radiation oncology department. Stoddard began offering intensity modulated radiation therapy (IMRT) in 2002, which allows them to precisely shape the radiation beam to maximize treatment of the tumor while minimizing exposure to the surrounding healthy tissue.

In 2004, Stoddard began treating patients using stereotactic radiosurgery. Both of these were first used for healthcare in central Iowa. Today, the John Stoddard Cancer Center remains at the forefront of cancer care in Central Iowa. In 2008, the cancer center opened the completely renovated Stoddard Adult Oncology Unit, hired three new radiation oncologists, installed a state-of-the-art PET/CT scanner and continued to offer cancer care coordinator services and multidisciplinary team support to cancer patients with the edition of a new colorectal cancer care coordinator and a breast cancer care coordinator.

== The legacy of John D. Stoddard ==
John Stoddard was an engineer (by training), a real estate developer and an entrepreneur by profession who amassed a large fortune, giving most of it away. He would often say that the reason he worked so hard to make money was to have more to give away.

Before John’s own brief fight with cancer and death in 1998, none of his family members ever had cancer. In 1990, his keen interest in medical care and compassion for others still compelled him to support the Iowa Methodist Medical Center’s new cancer center with a $4 million gift. In recognition of his generosity, the center was named the John Stoddard Cancer Center.
