= Mercy Hospital (Nampa, Idaho) =

- U.S. National Register of Historic Places
- Location within Idaho Location within the United States
- Location: 1615 8th St., S., Nampa, Idaho
- Coordinates: 43°34′11.2″N 116°33′44.3″W
- Area: area = 2.066 acres (0.836 ha)
- Built: 1919
- Architect: Tourtellotte & Hummel
- Architectural style: Late 19th and early 20th century Revivals/Mission/Spanish Colonial Revival
- Demolished: 2016 after fire
- NRHP reference No.: 14000504
- Added to NRHP: August 19, 2014

Mercy Hospital was a two-story building in Nampa, Idaho, United States. Built in 1919 and operated by the Sisters of Mercy, the building was vacated in 1967 when the hospital moved to the newly constructed Mercy Medical Center. The building was then used by several different occupants, the last, Valley Plaza Retirement Center, closed in 2004.

== History ==
Fundraising began in 1917 for a 32-room hospital. Financed by the city and the Sisters of Mercy, and using land donated by the Catholic Church, the ground was broken in December 1918. The building was completed in October 1919 and dedicated on November 4, 1919. The building was expended several times, including 1936, 1957, and 1959, with a final capacity of 100. Having outgrown the 6th Street location, the hospital moved to a 120-bed facility on 12th Avenue in 1967.

The building was added to the National Register of Historic Places in 2014. The entire block between 16th and 17th Avenues South and 8th and 9th Streets South is included in the listing, though only the hospital building and a grotto retain historic or architectural significance. Mercy Hospital is significant as an example of a community-based effort to build a modern hospital at a time when such a facility was unusual for a town of Nampa's size.

== Recent use ==
The building was used as an office building, storage, and as a Head Start location in the years after 1967. It was remodeled for use as an assisted living facility in the 1990s that closed in 2004. The building has been vacant since then.

In early 2006 there was a fire in the abandoned building. Another fire in January 2016 gutted much of the interior and damaged the roof. In May the building was demolished.
