= Roy J. and Lucille A. Carver College of Medicine =

Medical school of the University of Iowa, US

Coordinates: 41.660168°N 91.548364°W

- Type: Flagship; Public
- Established: 1870
- Dean: Denise Jamieson
- Faculty: 879
- Students: 600 MD, 50 PA, 340 other
- Location: Iowa City, Iowa, United States
- Website: www.medicine.uiowa.edu

The Roy J. and Lucille A. Carver College of Medicine (also known as CCOM or Carver) is the medical school of the University of Iowa, located in Iowa City, Iowa, United States.

The first medical college associated with the University of Iowa was founded in 1850, in the small town of Keokuk, Iowa, but the current Iowa City program can trace its roots to 1870. The program became notable as the first co-educational medical school in the United States, and was one of 22 original members of the Association of American Medical Colleges in 1876.

== History ==
The Iowa State Legislature approved plans for medical training on the main campus of the University of Iowa in 1868, and ten women were among the first class in 1870 The first purpose-built university hospital did not open its doors until 1898.

The UI hospitals' clinical capacity was increased tenfold, from 50 to 500 beds. In 1922, the Rockefeller Foundation gave the University $2.25 million, with state matching funds, to build a new University Hospital on the west campus, where the modern hospital buildings remain today. Statewide ambulance service began in 1932.

In 1939, Iowa researchers developed modern blood banking and UI hospitals became the first in the world to develop a successful method of freezing human sperm, leading to a live birth in 1952. Other innovations from this period include the first human EEG recordings, first description of how blood is supplied to the prostate gland, the Ponseti Method of surgical treatment of clubfoot, and one of the world's first heart-lung machines.

In 1998, the UI hospitals were certified as a Level I Trauma Center with pediatric commitment by the American College of Surgeons. In 2002, in recognition of $90 million in total contributions, the UI College of Medicine was renamed after Roy J. Carver and his widow, Lucille A. Carver.

== Profile ==
The student body of each entering class of the medical school consists of about 150 students. About two-thirds are in-state students. 11 are in the MSTP program. Nearly half of the students are female. The student body has close to 600 medical students, 650 resident and fellow physicians, 200 associated medical science students, and 50 physician assistant students. Also, 5,000 undergraduate students are enrolled in science classes at the school.

The school has between 900 and 1,000 faculty members and more than 3,000 staff members.

== Admissions ==
Carver College of Medicine participates in AMCAS, and will then send applicants who meet a minimum set of requirements a secondary application.

After an applicant's file is complete, then the school may invite the applicant to visit for an interview. Interviews are for one day each held starting in mid-September and run through January.

Interviewees are offered the option of staying with a student host before or after their visit. Hosting students are either from SNMA or MSAP (medical student ambassadors program).

== Academics ==
Carver College of Medicine Departments
Basic Science Departments
- Anatomy & Cell Biology
- Biochemistry
- Microbiology
- Molecular Physiology & Biophysics
- Pharmacology
Clinical Departments
- Anesthesiology
- Cardiothoracic Surgery
- Dermatology
- Emergency Medicine
- Family Medicine
- Internal Medicine
- Neurology
- Neurosurgery
- Obstetrics and Gynecology
- Ophthalmology and Visual Sciences
- Orthopaedics and Rehabilitation
- Otolaryngology
- Pathology
- Pediatrics
- Psychiatry
- Radiation Oncology
- Radiology
- Surgery
- Urology

CCOM underwent a major change in their curriculum that went into effect in August 2014 for the Class of 2018. This involved shortening the preclinical curriculum to 18 months, and moving Step 1 to after completion of the core clinical rotations.

=== Preclinical ===
After an introductory semester in a Foundations Block, the curriculum is then composed of three distinct courses: mechanisms of health and disease (MOHD), medicine and society (MAS), and clinical and professional skills (CAPS).

Grading for MAS and CAPS is pass/fail, but for Foundations/MOHD it is honors/near honors/pass/fail (not normalized).

=== Clinical ===
==== Core rotations ====
The 48 weeks of required core rotations are composed of four separate blocks of twelve weeks each: ambulatory, inpatient, neurology/psychiatry, and selectives.

The Ambulatory Practice Module (APM) includes outpatient internal medicine, family medicine, and community based primary care.

The inpatient block includes inpatient internal medicine, ObGyn, pediatrics, and surgery.

For psychiatry and neurology, students complete four weeks in each service and have four additional weeks to get ahead on selectives.

Finally, for selectives, students choose to complete six rotations of two weeks each in anesthesia, dermatology, lab med EKG, ophthalmology, orthopedics, otolaryngology, radiology, and urology.

==== Teaching affiliates ====
- University of Iowa Hospitals and Clinics (UIHC)
- Iowa City VA Hospital
- Des Moines Medical Education Consortium (Broadlawns Medical Center, Blank Children's Hospital, Iowa Lutheran, Iowa Methodist)
- Clinics throughout Iowa (mostly private)

==== Distinction tracks ====
CCOM offers multiple tracks to allow give MD students a structured way to explore additional interests above and beyond the traditional medical school curriculum:

Teaching
Recognizes completion of coursework, time spent working with a mentor, and teaching experiences.
Global Health
Involves an elective rotation abroad and learning about service, policy making, research and teaching.
Research
Requires a substantial investment of time in a research project and either a publication or presentation.
Humanities
Develops students' abilities in ethics, writing and humanities.
Healthcare Delivery
Introduced in 2016, with the Tippie College of Business as the major partner, completion of a series of courses in business allow for a better understanding of how to improve healthcare delivery.
Service
Recognizes commitment to helping the underserved.

==== Other programs ====
CCOM Rural Iowa Scholars Program
CRISP offers to help offset the costs of attendance in return for a commitment to serve as a primary care provider in rural Iowa.
Community Health Outreach
CHO is a two-year elective with an emphasis on service learning. The course is organized and led by second year medical students. It combines classroom learning with experiences serving through local organizations. To complete the program, students must carry out a self-directed project with an underserved or vulnerable population. Local partners include the local Ronald McDonald House and Grow Johnson County.
Introduction to Medical Education at Iowa
IMEI is a 6-week summer program for a cohort of ~20 pre-M1 students designed to allow students to adapt life in Iowa City and prepare for the rigors of medical school academics in the fall. The program has been running for ~20 years. The program consists is primarily composed of selected sample of classes that students will encounter in the fall (covering biochemistry, anatomy, anatomy lab, genetics). In 2016, there were also some social events included, such as a night out to watch the MLB minor league team play (Cedar Rapids Kernels), a progressive dinner, and an afternoon grill party at City Park. In 2016, there was a stipend of ~$3000 offered to offset any costs incurred in participating.

== Research ==
UI Carver College of Medicine received $228.1 million in external research funding in FY 2010.

=== Centers within the Carver College of Medicine ===
- Center on Aging
- Center for Auditory Regeneration and Deafness
- Center for Bioinformatics and Computational Biology
- Holden Comprehensive Cancer Center, one of 39 NCI-designated comprehensive cancer centers in the nation
- Cardiovascular Research Center
- Craniofacial Research Center
- Cystic Fibrosis Research Center
- Fraternal Order of Eagles Diabetes Research Center
- Center for Functional Genomics of Hypertension
- Center for Gene Therapy of Cystic Fibrosis and Other Genetic Diseases
- General Clinical Research Center
- Huntington’s Disease Society of America Huntington’s Disease Center
- Center for the Implementation of Innovative Strategies in Practice
- George M. O’Brien Kidney Research Center
- Iowa Comprehensive Lung Imaging Center
- Institute for Vision Research
- Carver Family Center for Macular Degeneration
- Senator Paul D. Wellstone Cooperative Research Center
- Specialized Center of Research in Osteoarthritis
- Helen C. Levitt Center for Viral Pathogenesis and Disease

=== Research programs ===
- Program Project Grant on Atherosclerosis
- Bacterial Respiratory Pathogens Research Unit
- Cancer and Aging Program
- Cerebral Vascular Biology Program Project Grant
- Program in Gene Discovery
- Research Program in Genetics of Prematurity
- Inflammation Program
- Pain Research Program
- NIH Vaccine Treatment and Evaluation Unit

== Notable alumni ==
- Achih H. Chen, plastic surgeon

== See also ==
- Roy J. Carver Charitable Trust
