= UnityPoint Health - Finley Hospital =

Coordinates: 42.4955°N 90.6867°W

- UnityPoint Health

Geography
- Location: Dubuque, Iowa, United States

Organization
- Care system: Nonprofit Hospital
- Type: District general
- Affiliated university: Unknown

Services
- Emergency department: Level III trauma center
- Beds: 126

History
- Former name: Finley Hospital
- Founded: 1890

Links
- Website: https://www.unitypoint.org/locations/unitypoint-health---finley-hospital
- Lists: Hospitals in Iowa

UnityPoint Health - Finley Hospital is a general hospital located in Dubuque, Iowa. It is certified by the Centers for Medicare & Medicaid Services (CMS) and accepts Medicare and Medicaid as a form of payment.

Service lines include acute renal dialysis, anesthesia, cardiac catheterization, laboratory testing, inpatient and outpatient rehabilitation, obstetrics, emergency and psychiatric care, diagnostic imaging (CT, MRI, PET, nuclear medicine), and various surgical procedures.

The hospital specializes in pediatric, neonatal intensive care, and trauma care. It is accredited for both inpatient and outpatient services, operates a full-service emergency department, and maintains intensive care units.

Finley is a non-profit hospital accredited by the Joint Commission on Accreditation of Healthcare Organizations and licensed by the state of Iowa.

== History ==
=== Early history ===
Dr. John Finley was Dubuque's first general physician and the second permanent physician of both Dubuque County and the state of Iowa. He was active in the Dubuque community, belonging to the early settlers' group, helping to organize the Presbyterian Church, and forming the Northwest Medical Society (now the Dubuque County Medical Society).

After his death, Dr. Finley bequeathed his property, valued at $80,000, to establish a hospital to be managed by Dubuque physicians. The articles of incorporation for The Finley Hospital Company were adopted on February 21, 1890, and the Finley residence was converted into a twenty-seven-room hospital with forty beds.

The first board of directors consisted of 20 men and 14 women. William Harrison Day Sr. served as the first president of the Finley hospital board of trustees.

The first patients were admitted in 1890. Finley Hospital sent aged, mentally ill, or chronically ill patients to other facilities. Although it could house 40 patients, conditions were reported to be sub-optimal; surgeries were performed in a glass-walled cupola to maximize available light.

In 1896, Abraham Slimmer of Waverly, Iowa, pledged $50,000 to the hospital, contingent on Dubuque raising an equal amount by March 1, 1897. Henry L. Stout contributed $25,000, but local fundraising stalled, prompting appeals in the Dubuque Herald. By the deadline, the community had raised $52,239.36. The trustees allocated $25,000 for a new building and invested the remainder. Plans included repurposing the original building as a nurses' home and establishing a training school to provide affordable staffing and professional opportunities for women.

In 1898, a pavilion addition was constructed at Finley Hospital using funds from the Finley request. The hospital, accommodating 70 patients, was opened for public inspection on June 25, and later on September 24, drawing approximately 6,000 visitors. The addition featured Dubuque's first patient transfer system using elevators, steam heating to reduce infections, and a third-floor kitchen to prevent cooking odors. Various contributions included furnished rooms and equipment, with Mrs. Fred O'Donnell providing the largest donation, including an electric lighting plant and operating room furnishings. Opening day festivities were organized by the Dorothea Dix Circle, which raised funds in creative ways, such as dressing as streetcar conductors.

In 1898, Finley Hospital established a nurses' training program, the first of its kind in the area outside of Chicago. Applicants needed a high school diploma and physical stamina. The program included three months of instruction, followed by two years of hospital work, with the first class of four nurses graduating in 1900. By 1902, the graduating class grew to 20, and the original hospital building was repurposed as a nurses' home.

In the same year, Henry L. Stout donated an ambulance with features such as curtained windows, ventilators, a heated interior, and rubber wheels. The ambulance, stored at Byrne Brothers, could be summoned at any time, with the cost covered by the city council's usual livery fees.

=== Early 20th century expansions ===
By 1910, increasing demand led the hospital board to consider expanding facilities. The public toured the new Lull Memorial Home for nurses during National Hospital Day. Finley Hospital was one of only thirteen Iowa hospitals with more than 100 beds by the 1920s. The hospital's charity work posed financial challenges. In 1920, free services cost the hospital $17,020.50, with only $4,168.46 offset by the Slimmer charity fund, resulting in a net loss of $12,852.04.

The Women's Army Auxiliary Corps played a role at Finley Hospital, hosting annual "fruit showers" to provide patients with jars of fruit and jelly while funding charity work, repairs, and improvements. In 1921, Dr. F. P. McNamara was hired to lead the Pathological Laboratory, eliminating delays caused by sending specimens to other cities. In 1925, the Sunshine Circle held a Better Baby Health Conference, examining children born at Finley under American Medical Society guidelines.

Expansions followed, including an addition in 1950 that increased bed capacity, operating rooms, and maternity facilities, and an addition of a cobalt therapy unit for cancer treatments in 1961. In 1970, the Dubuque County Medical Society purchased multimedia educational materials for coronary care, benefiting Finley and other local hospitals. A $2.875 million expansion in 1973 added further facilities.

=== Modernization and technological advancement ===
In 1984, Finley Hospital closed its School of Nursing, citing declining enrollment and cost pressures, though current students were allowed to complete the program. In 1987, the hospital received a $1 million gift from the estate of Lester Wendt to establish the Wendt Regional Cancer Center. Opened on November 13, 1987, the $3 million facility treated up to 60 patients daily. In 1989, Finley introduced Family Birthing Suites, allowing women to experience delivery and recovery in the same room.

In 1990, Finley Hospital employed around 600 people, contributing approximately $100 million to the local economy, with $14 million spent on salaries, benefits, and supplies. It also provided training for local college and technical students. In 1991, Finley introduced a policy allowing acute care patients to be visited by their pets. Due to growth in outpatient services, the hospital began a $1 million parking expansion project.

In 1992, Finley announced a $11.3 million program to expand outpatient care, remodel the emergency center, and expand the health education center. The Babka Outpatient Care Unit was named in honor of Edward and Shirley Babka's contributions.

In August 1993, Finley and Mercy Health Center formed the Dubuque Regional Health System to reduce costs and improve efficiency. However, the U.S. Justice Department filed an antitrust suit, and after litigation, Finley withdrew from the alliance in 1997, with the case eventually dismissed.

In 1994, Finley Hospital expanded with the construction of an intensive-care unit, the Babka Outpatient Surgery Wing, and a new entrance. Additional developments included the Delhi Medical Center (2002), Kehl Diabetes Center (2006), and a west wing addition (2008) with all-private rooms. The hospital installed a General Electric Spiral CT Scanner in 1994, and introduced the Kids Count Too program for children with family members battling cancer that same year.

Efforts to unionize began in 1995, and in 1996, Heartland AirMed started transporting patients. In December 1996, the Finley/Mercy Diabetes Center opened. Finley applied for a permanent MRI center in 1997, but the state denied approval. That same year, the hospital became a partner in Iowa Health System, expanding access to medical expertise and providing economic benefits. New services included a pain management program and the "Convenient Care" after-hours clinic. Finley was also designated a Level II hospital for high-risk pregnancies.

In 1997, Finley and Mercy gained approval to have their own MRI units after changes in the Iowa Department of Public Health's approval process. The Wendt Regional Cancer Center, marking its tenth anniversary, added a $2 million high-energy accelerator to its facilities and continued its work with Mayo Clinic's clinical trials. In 1998, Finley merged with Comprehensive Rehab, expanding its therapy services. The hospital also partnered with Hospice of Dubuque for tissue donation from terminally ill patients.

Finley opened the Summit Health Center for Older Adults in 1998, offering specialized care for older patients with psychiatric and cognitive disorders. The hospital launched a weekly wound clinic in 1999 for chronic, non-healing wounds. In 2004, Finley became a provider for John Deere's new healthcare plan.

In 2005, Finley and Mercy absorbed charity-care costs, despite challenges with reimbursements. In 2006, Finley became the first hospital in Dubuque to offer free wireless internet for patients and visitors.

In 2008, Finley purchased the Siegert-Casper Funeral Home to build a 70,000-square-foot addition, in order to replace the existing emergency and surgical departments and add a heart center.

=== Recent developments ===
In 2010, Finley was added to the "100 Top Hospitals" list by Thomson Reuters for its performance in patient safety, quality, and cost measures. In 2012, the hospital was approved for a cardiac cauterization laboratory to treat cardiovascular disease, and installed the da Vinci robotic system for surgeries.

In 2014, Finley Hospital introduced 3-D mammography, becoming the first in the community to offer the service. In 2015, Edward and Shirley Babka donated $1 million toward the Grand-view Expansion Project.

Unity Point Health, previously Iowa Health System, expanded to include Finley Hospital along with other hospitals and clinics in Iowa, Illinois, and Wisconsin. In June 2015, Finley's Wound and Hyperbolic Center received the Joint Commission's Gold Seal of Approval for Wound Care Management. Finley Hospital's name was changed to Unity Point Health Finley Hospital.

In 2020, Grand River Medical Group's oncology clinic relocated to Finley's Wendt Regional Cancer Center.

The Title V Doula Project was launched in 2021 to improve maternal health outcomes for Black women in Iowa, providing doula support during pregnancy and delivery.

In 2022, Finley Hospital received the Chest Pain - MI Registry Award Silver by the American College of Cardiology, as well as a Primary Stroke Center Certification from DNV.

On July 9, 2023, it was announced that Chad Wolbers, President and CEO of Finley Hospital, would leave his position in August 2023.

Finley Hospital holds accreditation from Det Norske Veritas (DNV) and is licensed by the State of Iowa. Finley Hospital has been designated as a Primary Stroke Center by the Joint Commission and the American Heart Association/American Stroke Association (AHA/ASA).

In 2024, Finley Hospital received the American Heart Association's Get With The Guidelines® - Stroke Recognition Gold Plus quality achievement award, alongside the Stroke Honor Roll Elite Award, and Type 2 Diabetes Honor Roll. The hospital also earned a certificate of achievement for its participation in the American Heart Association's Mission: Lifeline® Stroke post-acute care initiative. Finley earned a Centers for Medicaid and Medicare Services (CMS) 5-Star Hospital rating for the fourth year in a row, and was designated as a Center of Excellence in Oncology Rehabilitation through the Physiological Oncology Rehabilitation Institute (PORI).
