= Mercy Medical Center (Idaho) =

Geography
- Location: Nampa, Idaho, United States
- Coordinates: 43°33′14″N 116°34′11″W

Organization
- Type: General
- Religious affiliation: Catholic church

History
- Opened: 1919
- Closed: 2017
- Demolished: 2019

Links
- Website: www.saintalphonsus.org/nampa/
- Lists: Hospitals in Idaho

Mercy Medical Center was a Roman Catholic hospital located in Nampa, Idaho. The hospital was founded in 1919 by the Sisters of Mercy at the nearby Mercy Hospital, and moved to the current location in 1967. It was acquired by Trinity Health Systems and added to the Saint Alphonsus chain in 2010. It was closed in 2017, when services moved to the new St. Alphonsus facilities. Demolition began in December 2019.
