= University of Iowa Hospitals & Clinics =

Teaching hospital in Iowa City, Iowa, U.S.

Coordinates: 41.658°N 91.548°W

Geography
- Location: 200 Hawkins Drive, Iowa City, Iowa, United States

Organization
- Care system: Medicare/Medicaid/Private
- Type: Teaching
- Affiliated university: University of Iowa

Services
- Emergency department: Level I trauma center
- Beds: 811

Helipads
- Helipad: FAA LID: 1IA7
Number	Length		Surface
Number	ft	m	Surface
H1	48 x 48	15 x 15	concrete
H2	30 x 60	9 x 18	concrete

History
- Founded: 1898

Links
- Website: http://www.uihc.org/
- Lists: Hospitals in Iowa

University of Iowa Hospitals & Clinics (UIHC) is an 811-bed public teaching hospital and level 1 trauma center affiliated with the University of Iowa in Iowa City, Iowa, United States. UI Hospitals and Clinics is part of University of Iowa Health Care, a partnership that includes the Roy J. and Lucille A. Carver College of Medicine and the University of Iowa Physicians group practice.

It is located on the university campus in Iowa City, Iowa at Melrose Avenue and Hawkins Drive near Kinnick Stadium. At times during televised Hawkeye football games, the hospital can be seen in the background. The hospital is one of three in Iowa City, the others being the Iowa City Veterans Administration Health Care System, a VA medical center and Medical Center Downtown ( formerly Mercy Hospital, a private hospital), another hospital of UI Health Care

UI Hospitals and Clinics employs over 15,000 people and is overseen by the Iowa Board of Regents. It is Iowa's only comprehensive, tertiary-level center and also its premier medical facility. In addition to taking care of local patients, people throughout the state and region are often referred to the university's hospitals for treatment of serious or complex illnesses or injuries.

== History ==
The University of Iowa began medical services in 1873 when its medical department entered into an agreement with the Sisters of Mercy to operate a small hospital in the community. Davenport, Iowa physician Washington Freeman Peck and other physicians raised $5,000 to renovate a vacant school building known as Mechanics Academy into a 20-bed hospital. This hospital had two open wards for both men and women, four private rooms, and a surgical amphitheater. Dr. Peck convinced the Mother Superior of the Davenport-based Sisters of Mercy to send nuns to Iowa City to help care for patients. This arrangement lasted until 1885, when the Sisters moved to a nearby vacant mission and opened Mercy Hospital one year later.

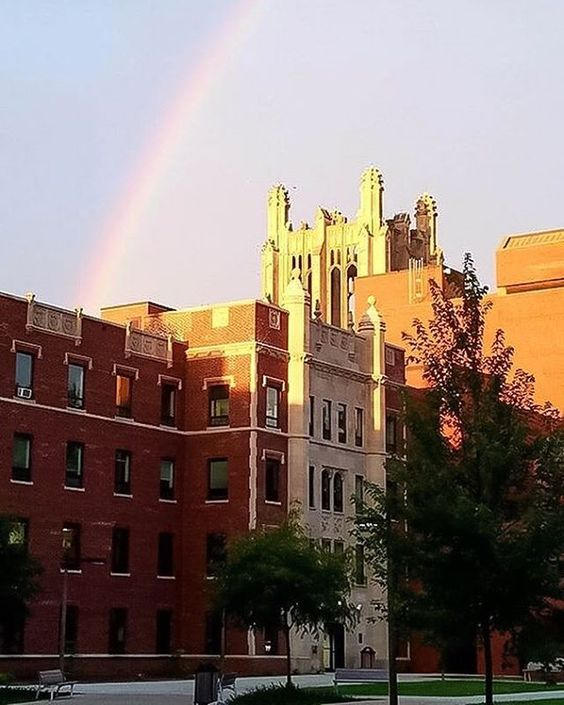
General Hospital's Collegiate Gothic tower

It soon became apparent that a new hospital was needed as the university was outgrowing its original facility. In 1896 the state of Iowa approved the needed appropriations. A 65-bed hospital was built in 1898 where the school's Seashore Hall is now located. This facility was state of the art at the time of its construction, with both electrical lighting and steam heating. The hospital featured a 200-seat amphitheater for instructional purposes.

Following passage of indigent care laws in 1928, patient admissions increased greatly. The current hospital was built in 1928 as a 735-bed hospital. At the time of its construction, the hospital building was one of the largest in the country.

== Related institutions ==
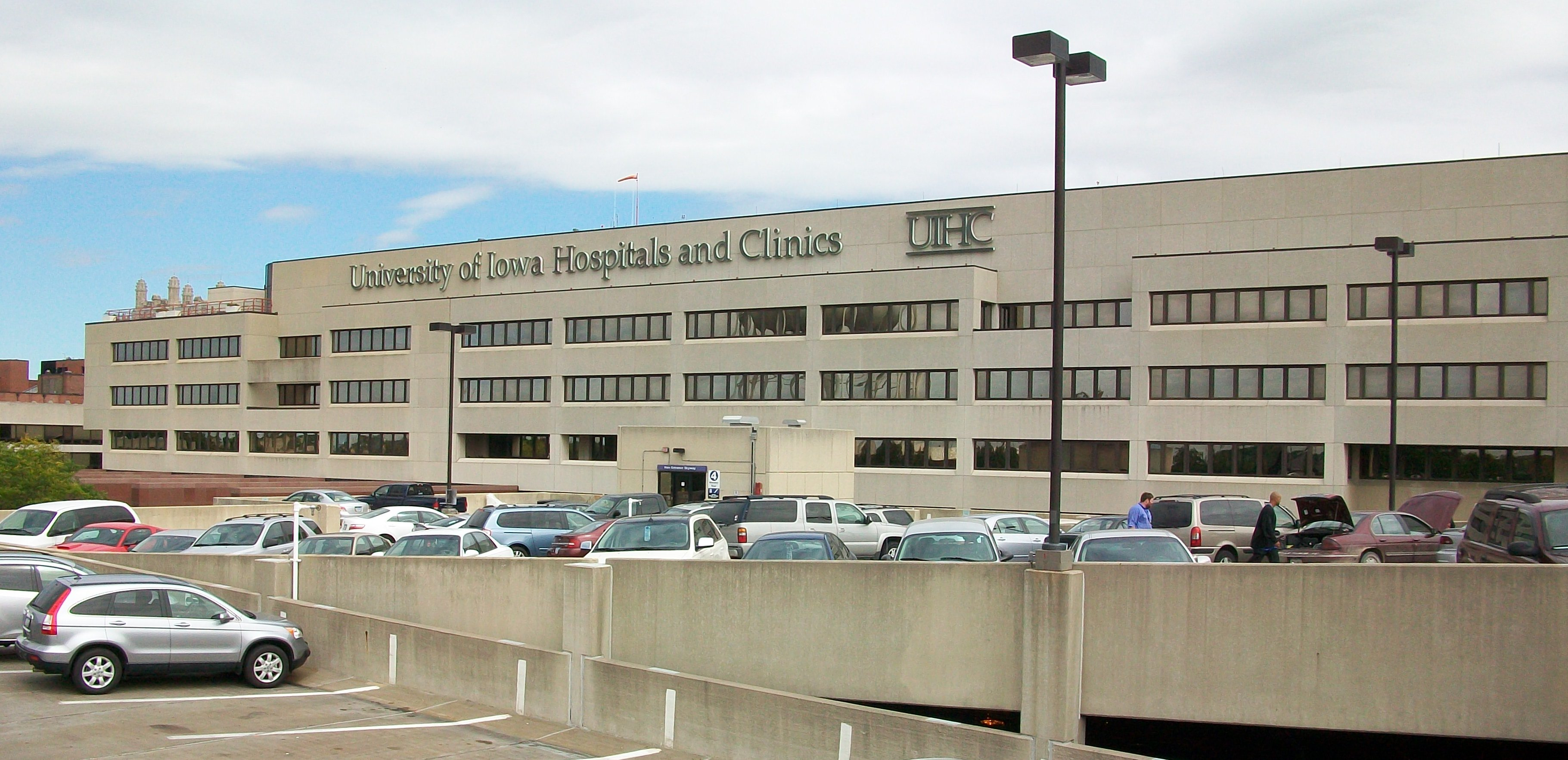
A portion of the University of Iowa Hospitals and Clinics

=== Carver College of Medicine ===
The Carver College of Medicine is the medical school of the University of Iowa. The Carver College of Medicine can trace its roots to the 1870s.

=== University of Iowa Stead Family Children's Hospital ===
University of Iowa Children's Hospital was founded in 1919. As Iowa's only comprehensive children's hospital, it provides care for children from birth to young adulthood. The new UI Stead Family Children's Hospital building opened in February 2017 and includes more than 170 pediatric doctors, surgeons, and dentists, and more than 500 specially trained pediatric nurses. It is the only nationally ranked children's hospital in Iowa, and is home to Iowa's only Level 4 NICU, Level 1 Trauma Center for pediatrics, pediatric dermatologists, pediatric genetics team, pediatric renal dialysis, pediatric rheumatologists, pediatric urologist, pediatric heart, kidney, liver, pancreas, and blood and bone marrow transplants. Patients come from every county in Iowa, nearly every state in the United States, and several international countries.

=== University of Iowa Health Care Downtown ===
In the wake of Mercy Iowa City's financial difficulties and bankruptcy, UIHC acquired Mercy Iowa City and it became University of Iowa Health Care Downtown on January 31, 2024. This means that the hospital is no longer affiliated with the Sisters of Mercy.

== Affiliates ==
In the mid-2010s, the hospital started an affiliate program with several hospitals across Iowa. These include Genesis Medical Center, among others. The University of Iowa hospital and Clinics has an office within the Genesis Medical Center building located on Middle Road in Bettendorf, Iowa.
