= UnityPoint Health =

American healthcare network in Des Moines, Iowa, U.S.

- Formerly: Iowa Health System
- Type: Private
- Industry: Healthcare
- Founded: November 22, 1993; 32 years ago
- Founder: Steven Weinkselbaum
- Headquarters: Des Moines, Iowa, U.S.
- Area served: Iowa, Illinois, and Wisconsin
- Key people: Scott Kizer (CEO)
- Products: Hospitals, clinics and home care services
- Website: www.unitypoint.org

UnityPoint Health is an American hospital network headquartered in Des Moines, Iowa, United States. in the U.S. states of Iowa, Illinois, and Wisconsin. Formed in 1993 as the Iowa Health System, UnityPoint Health is the second-largest hospital in Iowa, following MercyOne. It was formed from a merger of the Iowa Lutheran Hospital and the Iowa Methodist Hospital. It would later re-brand to UnityPoint Health in 2013, following the acquisition of the Meriter Hospital.

== History ==
=== Background ===
UnityPoint Health was preceded by Iowa Lutheran Hospital and Iowa Methodist Hospital, both of Des Moines, Iowa. Iowa Lutheran Hospital was formed in 1914. At the time, Iowa Lutheran Hospital specialized in maternity care and family practice services. Additionally, it had the largest private, hospital-based mental health system. Iowa Methodist Hospital was formed on January 16, 1901, a 30-bed hospital on the former site of Callanan College. At the time, it specialized in cancer treatment, physical rehabilitation, pediatrics, and emergency care.

=== Early history ===
In February 1993, it was announced that Iowa Lutheran Hospital and Iowa Methodist Medical Center would merge to form what was reported to be Iowa's largest hospital network. The merger was approved later that year, and the Iowa Health System was officially formed on November 22, 1993. The Iowa Health System would begin expanding throughout Iowa, with St. Luke's Regional Medical Center of Sioux City joining in 1996. Following the addition of the Meriter Hospital of Madison, Wisconsin, it was announced that the Iowa Health System would be re-branding to UnityPoint Health. This was because the system was no longer exclusive to the U.S. state of Iowa. In 2022, UnityPoint Health spun off Methodist, Proctor, and Pekin hospitals in Peoria, Illinois, to nonprofit Carle Health.

== List of hospitals ==
Hospital	Settlement	State	Emergency department	Trauma center	Founded	Ref.
John Stoddard Cancer Center	Des Moines	Iowa	✗		1993	
Iowa Lutheran Hospital	Des Moines	Iowa	✓	Level IV Trauma Center	1914	
UnityPoint Health - Iowa Methodist Medical Center	Des Moines	Iowa	✓	Level I Trauma Center	1901	
Blank Children's Hospital	Des Moines	Iowa	✓	Level II Pediatric Trauma Center	1944	
Methodist West Hospital	West Des Moines	Iowa	✓	Level IV Trauma Center	2009	
UnityPoint Health - St. Luke's Hospital - Cedar Rapids	Cedar Rapids	Iowa	✓	Level III Trauma Center	1884	
Jones Regional Medical Center	Anamosa	Iowa	✓	Level IV Trauma Center		
UnityPoint Health - Finley Hospital	Dubuque	Iowa	✓	Level III Trauma Center	1890	
UnityPoint Health - Trinity Regional Medical Center	Fort Dodge	Iowa	✓	Level IV Trauma Center	1973	
UnityPoint Health - Marshalltown Hospital	Marshalltown	Iowa	✓	Level IV Trauma Center		
Trinity Rock Island	Rock Island	Illinois	✓	Level II Trauma Center		
Trinity Moline	Moline	Illinois	✓			
Trinity Bettendorf	Bettendorf	Iowa	✓	Level IV Trauma Center		
Trinity Muscatine	Muscatine	Iowa	✓	Level IV Trauma Center		
UnityPoint Health - St. Luke's	Sioux City	Iowa	✓	Level III Trauma Center	1966	
UnityPoint Health - Allen Hospital	Waterloo	Iowa	✓	Level III Trauma Center	1925	
UnityPoint Health - Meriter	Madison	Wisconsin	✓	Level IV Trauma Center	1898	
UnityPoint Health - Grinnell Regional Medical Center	Grinnel	Iowa	✓	Level IV Trauma Center	1967	
