= Genesis Health System =

Geography
- Location: Davenport, Iowa, DeWitt, Iowa, Silvis, Illinois, & Aledo, Illinois., United States
- Coordinates: West Central Park 41.5434°N 90.5940°W; East Rusholme Street 41.5417°N 90.5566°W

Organization
- Care system: Non-profit Regional Health System
- Type: Regional size, Full-Service Health Care System
- Affiliated university: Genesis Quad Cities Family Medicine Residency Program

Services
- Emergency department: Level III
- Beds: 760

History
- Founded: 1869; 157 years ago

Links
- Website: https://www.genesishealth.com

Genesis Health System is a non-profit health system based in Davenport, Iowa.

The system provides health services to multiple communities in Eastern Iowa and Western Illinois which includes 6 different hospitals. Genesis is the largest employer in Scott County, Iowa and the third largest in the Quad City area with 5,200 employees.

In March 2023, MercyOne acquired the Iowa-based healthcare system.

== History ==
Genesis originally consisted of two hospitals that joined on May 24, 1994, to form the system. The two founding hospitals were Mercy Hospital and St. Luke's Hospital, both in Davenport, Iowa. The former was founded by the Sisters of Mercy in response to an influenza outbreak in the area in 1869.

Today, Genesis operates a total of five hospitals and manages Jackson County Regional Health Center in Maquoketa, Iowa. Doug Cropper served as president and CEO of Genesis from 2008 to 2023. In 2023, Cropper retired to serve as a mission president for The Church of Jesus Christ of Latter-day Saints in Frankfurt, Germany. In March 2023, Dr. Kurt Andersen was selected as Cropper's successor and was appointed president of Genesis.

=== Mercy Hospital ===
Established by Mother Mary Borromeo Johnson and the Sisters of Mercy, Mercy Hospital received its first patient on December 7, 1869. In 1872, St. Elizabeth's Hospital for the Mentally ill was opened adjacent to Mercy Hospital.

Because of the 1918 flu pandemic, Mercy Hospital was forced to open an extension in Turner Hall in order to accommodate the patients. In 1924, Mercy Hospital was one of the first hospitals accredited by the American College of Surgeons.

In 1932, a new wing was opened and in 1954, a new facility replaced the original building. The idea to merge Mercy Hospital and St. Luke's was introduced in 1973 and initially rejected.

Another new Mercy Hospital was constructed 1978, with the construction of medical office buildings following just two years later in 1980. In order to fit the needs of a growing patient population, Mercy Hospital announced plans to expand again in 1987.

In 1993, the boards of St. Luke's and Mercy Hospital agreed to merge. The merger was completed in 1994.

=== St. Luke's Hospital ===
Founded in 1893 at the corner of 8th and Main Street in Davenport, St. Luke's Hospital mainly acted as an emergency care facility. In 1914, St. Luke's relocated to East Rusholme Street, the current location of Genesis Medical Center, East Campus.

In 1951 and again in 1964, additions to the new St. Luke's facility were completed.

== St. Elizabeth's Fire ==
1950 St. Elizabeth's Hospital fire
- Location: St. Elizabeth's Hospital, Davenport, Iowa, U.S.
- Date: January 7, 1950; 2:00 a.m. (UTC−6)
- Attack type: Arson
- Weapon: Lighter
- Deaths: 41
- Injuries: 24
- Perpetrator: Elnora Epperly

On 7 January 1950, a fire destroyed St. Elizabeth's Hospital for the Mentally Ill, killing 41 individuals and injuring 24 others, the majority of which were patients. According to most sources, the fire was caused by Elnora "Ellie" Epperly, a 23-year-old patient who, believing that her husband was in trouble and that she needed to escape, lit curtains with a cigarette lighter.

Initially charged with murder, Elnora Epperly never faced trial after an inquest ruled that she was mentally ill and thus couldn't be accounted for her crime.

After spending the next several months in an Illinois hospital, Ellie was released into the custody of her husband, John.

Now the location of Genesis Medical Center, West Central Park, a small cemetery has been erected in honor of those who died as a result of St. Elizabeth's fire. Sixteen of the 41 victims are buried at the site.

== Hospitals ==
Hospitals
Facility Name	City	State	Licensed Beds	Address
Genesis Medical Center, Aledo	Aledo	Illinois	22	409 NW Ninth Avenue Aledo, IL 61231
Genesis Medical Center, Davenport, East Rusholme Street	Davenport	Iowa	350	1227 East Rusholme Street Davenport, IA 52803
Genesis Medical Center, Davenport, West Central Park Avenue	Davenport	Iowa	200	1401 West Central Park Avenue Davenport, IA 52804
Genesis Medical Center, DeWitt	DeWitt	Iowa	13	1118 11th Street DeWitt, IA 52742
Genesis Medical Center, Silvis	Silvis	Illinois	150	801 Illini Drive Silvis, IL 61282
Jackson County Regional Health Center	Maquoketa	Iowa	25	700 West Grove Street Maquoketa, IA 52060
