= List of hospitals in Iowa =

This is a list of hospitals in Iowa (U.S. state), sorted by hospital name.

The following list is compiled based on active members registered with the Iowa Department of Health and Human Services and the Iowa Hospital Association.

Hospital Name	City	Network / System
Adair County Health System	Greenfield	Independent
Alegent Health Mercy Hospital	Council Bluffs	CHI Health
Audubon County Memorial Hospital and Clinics	Audubon	Independent
Avera Holy Family Hospital	Estherville	Avera Health
Avera Merrill Pioneer Hospital	Rock Rapids	Avera Health
Boone County Hospital	Boone	Independent
Broadlawns Medical Center	Des Moines	County
Buchanan County Health Center	Independence	Independent
Buena Vista Regional Medical Center	Storm Lake	Independent
Burgess Health Center	Onawa	Independent
Cass County Health System	Atlantic	Independent
Cherokee Regional Medical Center	Cherokee	Independent
CHI Health Mercy Corning	Corning	CHI Health
CHI Health Mercy Council Bluffs	Council Bluffs	CHI Health
CHI Health Missouri Valley	Missouri Valley	CHI Health
Clarinda Regional Health Center	Clarinda	Independent
Clarke County Hospital	Osceola	UnityPoint Health
Community Memorial Hospital	Sumner	Independent
Compass Memorial Healthcare	Marengo	Independent
Crawford County Memorial Hospital	Denison	Independent
Dallas County Hospital	Perry	Independent
Davis County Hospital and Clinics	Bloomfield	Independent
Decatur County Hospital	Leon	Independent
Floyd County Medical Center	Charles City	Independent
Floyd Valley Healthcare	Le Mars	Independent
Fort Madison Community Hospital	Fort Madison	Great River Health
Genesis Medical Center-Davenport	Davenport	Genesis Health System
Genesis Medical Center-De Witt	De Witt	Genesis Health System
George C. Grape Community Hospital	Hamburg	Independent
Great River Health System	West Burlington	Great River Health
Greater Regional Health	Creston	Independent
Greene County Medical Center	Jefferson	UnityPoint Health
Grundy County Memorial Hospital	Grundy Center	UnityPoint Health
Gundersen Palmer Lutheran Hospital and Clinics	West Union	Gundersen Health System
Guthrie County Hospital	Guthrie Center	Independent
Guttenberg Municipal Hospital	Guttenberg	Independent
Hancock County Health System	Britt	MercyOne
Hansen Family Hospital	Iowa Falls	MercyOne
Hawarden Regional Healthcare	Hawarden	Independent
Hegg Health Center Avera	Rock Valley	Avera Health
Henry County Health Center	Mount Pleasant	Great River Health
Horn Memorial Hospital	Ida Grove	Independent
Humboldt County Memorial Hospital	Humboldt	Independent
Iowa Specialty Hospital-Belmond	Belmond	Independent
Iowa Specialty Hospital-Clarion	Clarion	Independent
Jackson County Regional Health Center	Maquoketa	Genesis Health System
Jefferson County Health Center	Fairfield	Independent
Keokuk County Health Center	Sigourney	Independent
Knoxville Hospital and Clinics	Knoxville	Independent
Kossuth Regional Health Center	Algona	MercyOne
Lakes Regional Healthcare	Spirit Lake	Avera Health
Loring Hospital	Sac City	Independent
Lucas County Health Center	Chariton	Independent
Madison County Health Care System	Winterset	Independent
Mahaska Health	Oskaloosa	Independent
Manning Regional Healthcare Center	Manning	Independent
Mary Greeley Medical Center	Ames	Municipal
Mercy Iowa City	Iowa City	MercyOne
Mercy Medical Center-Cedar Rapids	Cedar Rapids	Independent
MercyOne Cedar Falls Medical Center	Cedar Falls	MercyOne
MercyOne Centerville Medical Center	Centerville	MercyOne
MercyOne Clinton Medical Center	Clinton	MercyOne
MercyOne Clive Rehabilitation Hospital	Clive	MercyOne
MercyOne Des Moines Medical Center	Des Moines	MercyOne
MercyOne Dubuque Medical Center	Dubuque	MercyOne
MercyOne Dyersville Medical Center	Dyersville	MercyOne
MercyOne Elkader Medical Center	Elkader	MercyOne
MercyOne New Hampton Medical Center	New Hampton	MercyOne
MercyOne Newton Medical Center	Newton	MercyOne
MercyOne North Iowa Medical Center	Mason City	MercyOne
MercyOne Oelwein Medical Center	Oelwein	MercyOne
MercyOne Primghar Medical Center	Primghar	MercyOne
MercyOne Siouxland Medical Center	Sioux City	MercyOne
MercyOne Waterloo Medical Center	Waterloo	MercyOne
MercyOne West Des Moines Medical Center	West Des Moines	MercyOne
Methodist Jennie Edmundson	Council Bluffs	Methodist Health System
Mitchell County Regional Health Center	Osage	MercyOne
Monroe County Hospital and Clinics	Albia	Independent
Montgomery County Memorial Hospital	Red Oak	Independent
Myrtue Medical Center	Harlan	Independent
Orange City Area Health System	Orange City	Independent
Osceola Regional Health Center	Sibley	Avera Health
Ottumwa Regional Health Center	Ottumwa	Regional Care
Palo Alto County Hospital	Emmetsburg	MercyOne
Pella Regional Health Center	Pella	Independent
Pocahontas Community Hospital	Pocahontas	Independent
Regional Health Services of Howard County	Cresco	Independent
Regional Medical Center	Manchester	Independent
Ringgold County Hospital	Mount Ayr	Independent
Saint Anthony Regional Hospital	Carroll	Independent
Sanford Medical Center Sheldon	Sheldon	Sanford Health
Select Specialty Hospital-Des Moines	Des Moines	Select Medical
Select Specialty Hospital-Quad Cities	Davenport	Select Medical
Shenandoah Medical Center	Shenandoah	Independent
Sioux Center Health	Sioux Center	Avera Health
Spencer Hospital	Spencer	Independent
Stewart Memorial Community Hospital	Lake City	Independent
Story County Medical Center	Nevada	UnityPoint Health
UnityPoint Health-Allen Hospital	Waterloo	UnityPoint Health
UnityPoint Health-Blank Children's Hospital	Des Moines	UnityPoint Health
UnityPoint Health-Finley Hospital	Dubuque	UnityPoint Health
UnityPoint Health-Grinnell Regional Medical Center	Grinnell	UnityPoint Health
UnityPoint Health-Iowa Lutheran Hospital	Des Moines	UnityPoint Health
UnityPoint Health-Iowa Methodist Medical Center	Des Moines	UnityPoint Health
UnityPoint Health-Jones Regional Medical Center	Anamosa	UnityPoint Health
UnityPoint Health-Keokuk	Keokuk	UnityPoint Health
UnityPoint Health-Marshalltown	Marshalltown	UnityPoint Health
UnityPoint Health-Methodist West Hospital	Des Moines	UnityPoint Health
UnityPoint Health-Saint Luke's Hospital	Cedar Rapids	UnityPoint Health
UnityPoint Health-Saint Luke's, Sioux City	Sioux City	UnityPoint Health
UnityPoint Health-Trinity Bettendorf	Bettendorf	UnityPoint Health
UnityPoint Health-Trinity Muscatine	Muscatine	UnityPoint Health
UnityPoint Health-Trinity Regional Medical Center	Fort Dodge	UnityPoint Health
University of Iowa Hospitals and Clinics	Iowa City	UI Health Care
VA Central Iowa Health Care System-DSM	Des Moines	VHA
Van Buren County Hospital	Keosauqua	Independent
Van Diest Medical Center	Webster City	Independent
Veterans Memorial Hospital	Waukon	Independent
Virginia Gay Hospital	Vinton	Independent
Washington County Hospital and Clinics	Washington	Independent
Waverly Health Center	Waverly	Independent
Wayne County Hospital and Clinic System	Corydon	Independent
Winneshiek Medical Center	Decorah	Independent

== Closed hospitals ==
Hospital Name	City	Year Closed
Mercy Capitol Hospital	Des Moines	2000
Mercy Covenant Clinics	Arlington	1986
Xavier Hospital	Dubuque	1982
