= MercyOne =

American Catholic non-profit healthcare organization

- Type: Non-profit
- Industry: Healthcare
- Founded: 1998; 28 years ago, in Des Moines, Iowa, U.S.
- Headquarters: West Des Moines, Iowa, U.S.
- Area served: Iowa, Nebraska, Illinois
- Key people: Robert P. Ritz (CEO and president)
- Number of employees: 20,000
- Parent: Trinity Health
- Website: mercyone.org

MercyOne (formerly Mercy Health Network) is an American non-profit system of Catholic hospitals, clinics, and health care facilities in the U.S. states of Iowa, Nebraska, Illinois and surrounding communities. It is owned and operated by Trinity Health, since 2022. Previously, it was run under a joint operating agreement between Trinity Health and Catholic Health Initiatives (now CommonSpirit Health).

== History ==
In 2016, the health system announced plans for a $500 million renovation at MercyOne Des Moines Medical Center in downtown Des Moines. The project is expected to take five to eight years and include a new 11-story hospital tower as well as power plant.

Bob Ritz was appointed company president and CEO, effective July 1, 2017.

In 2019, the company changed its name from Mercy Health Network to MercyOne, and rebranded its 450 locations.

In 2020, an employee improperly accessed patient information; the data breach resulted in a class-action lawsuit settled by the company in 2024 for $1.8 million.

Trinity Health acquired CommonSpirit Health's 50% stake in MercyOne in September 2022.

MercyOne merged with Genesis Health System in March 2023.

In 2024, the MercyOne health network comprises over 40 hospitals and more than 230 health care facilities.

== Hospitals ==
Hospital	City	State
Palo Alto County Health System	Emmetsburg	Iowa
MercyOne Waterloo Medical Center	Waterloo	Iowa
MercyOne Oelwein Medical Center	Oelwein	Iowa
MercyOne Centerville Medical Center	Centerville	Iowa
MercyOne Clinton Medical Center	Clinton	Iowa
MercyOne Des Moines Medical Center	Des Moines	Iowa
MercyOne Dubuque Medical Center	Dubuque	Iowa
MercyOne Dyersville Medical Center	Dyersville	Iowa
MercyOne New Hampton Medical Center	New Hampton	Iowa
MercyOne North Iowa Medical Center	Mason City	Iowa
MercyOne West Des Moines Medical Center	West Des Moines	Iowa
MercyOne Cedar Falls Medical Center	Cedar Falls	Iowa
MercyOne Newton Medical Center	Newton	Iowa
