= Emory's Hope Clinic =

- Emory Vaccine Center, Emory University

Geography
- Location: 603 Church Street; Decatur, Georgia 30030

Organisation
- Type: Teaching
- Affiliated university: Emory University

Services
- Speciality: Clinical vaccine trials

Links
- Website: www.hopeclinic.emory.edu

The Hope Clinic of the Emory Vaccine Center, commonly known as Emory's Hope Clinic, is the clinical trials arm of the Emory Vaccine Center that is currently located near Dekalb Medical Center in Decatur, Georgia. The original Executive Director of the clinic was Dr. Mark Feinberg who lead from 2002 – 2004, followed by Dr. Carlos Del Rio from 2004 to 2006. The clinic staff consisted of an average of 10 - 15 employees during this time. Dr. Mark Mulligan became the Executive Director in 2006. As of 2022, Dr. Nadie Rouphael is the Executive Director.

Since 2012, the Hope Clinic has been studying HIV-negative subjects and the effect of protein antigens on healthy immune systems. This information is being collected and studied in conjunction with finding a potential cure for HIV-positive patients using a major immune system boost.
