= Chen Minzhang =

Chinese politician

- 陈敏章

Minister of Health
- In office April 1987 – March 1998
- Premier: Zhao Ziyang; Li Peng
- Preceded by: Cui Yueli
- Succeeded by: Zhang Wenkang

Personal details
- Born: December 1931 Shanghai, China
- Died: 16 March 1999 (aged 67) Beijing, China
- Party: Chinese Communist Party
- Education: Aurora University; Shanghai Jiao Tong University School of Medicine

Chinese name
- Simplified Chinese: 陈敏章
- Traditional Chinese: 陳敏章
Transcriptions
Standard Mandarin
- Hanyu Pinyin: Chén Mǐnzhāng

Chen Minzhang (Chinese: 陈敏章; December 1931 – 16 March 1999) was a Chinese politician who served as minister of health from 1987 to 1998. He also served as president of the Chinese Medical Association from 1989 to 1994 and president of the Red Cross Society of China from 1990 to 1994.

He was an alternate member of the 13th Central Committee of the Chinese Communist Party and a member of the 14th Central Committee of the Chinese Communist Party. He was a member of the Standing Committee of the 9th National People's Congress.

== Biography ==
Chen was born in Shanghai, in December 1931, while his ancestral home in Hangzhou, Zhejiang. He attended Xuhui High School. He became a Catholic near 1949. In 1949, he enrolled at the Medical School of Aurora University and entered Shanghai Jiao Tong University School of Medicine after the adjustment of universities and colleges in 1952. He joined the Chinese Communist Party (CCP) in 1954. He became an assistant after graduation. At the same time, he worked as a physician at St. Marie Hospital (now Ruijin Hospital).

In 1955, he was transferred to Beijing Xiehe Hospital (now Peking Union Medical College Hospital) and participated in the Socialist Education Movement in Shou County, Anhui in 1964. He became vice minister of health in 1984, rising to minister of health in April 1987. He also served as president of the Chinese Medical Association from 1989 to 1994 and president of the Red Cross Society of China from 1990 to 1994.

On 16 March 1999, he died from pancreatic cancer in Beijing, at the age of 67.

Government offices
| Preceded by Cui Yueli | Minister of Health; 1987–1998 | Succeeded by Zhang Wenkang |
Non-profit organization positions
| Preceded by Wu Jieping | President of the Chinese Medical Association; 1989–1999 | Succeeded by Zhang Wenkang |
| Preceded by Cui Yueli | President of the Red Cross Society of China; 1990–1994 | Succeeded by Qian Zhengying |
