= Chen Saijuan =

Chinese geneticist (born 1951)

- 陈赛娟
- Born: May 1951 (age 75); Yinzhou District, Ningbo, Zhejiang, China
- Education: Shanghai Second Medical College; Paris Diderot University
- Known for: Research on leukemia cytogenetics and acute promyelocytic leukemia
- Spouse: Chen Zhu
- Awards: Ho Leung Ho Lee Prize; State Natural Science Award
- Scientific career
- Fields: Hematology, molecular biology, genetics
- Workplaces: Shanghai Jiao Tong University School of Medicine

Chen Saijuan (Chinese: 陈赛娟; born May 1951), also known as Sai-Juan Chen, is a Chinese hematologist and molecular biologist with a research focus on leukemia cytogenetics. She is a professor and Director of the State Key Laboratory of Medical Genomics at Shanghai Jiao Tong University School of Medicine, Director of the Shanghai Institute of Hematology, and Vice-Chairwoman of the Chinese Medical Association. She is an academician of the Chinese Academy of Engineering and The World Academy of Sciences, and a foreign associate of the French Académie Nationale de Médecine and the Royal College of Physicians of the UK. She has made important discoveries in the pathogenesis of leukemia and developed therapies to treat acute promyelocytic leukemia (APL) and other types of leukemia.

== Biography ==
Chen was born in May 1951 in Yinzhou District, Ningbo, Zhejiang, China. During the early Cultural Revolution, she was forced to quit school and work in a textile factory at age 17. She was able to enter Shanghai Second Medical College a few years later, in 1972, and worked at Ruijin Hospital after graduating in 1975.

When graduate research was resumed after the Cultural Revolution, Chen was accepted in 1978 by the renowned hematologist Wang Zhenyi as his graduate student. Another student Wang accepted at the same time was Chen Zhu, her future husband.

Chen Saijuan earned her master's degree from Shanghai Second Medical College in 1981. She married Chen Zhu in March 1983, and the couple both went abroad to study in France, he in 1984, and she in 1986. She earned her D.Sc. from Paris VII University in 1989.

After returning to China, she became a professor at Shanghai Second Medical College, which was later merged into Shanghai Jiao Tong University to become its medical school. She is now Director of the State Key Laboratory of Medical Genomics at Shanghai Jiao Tong University School of Medicine, Director of the Shanghai Institute of Hematology, and Vice-Chairwoman of the Chinese Medical Association.

== Scientific contributions ==
Chen's research is focused on molecular genetics and especially the cytogenetics of leukemia, and she has made important discoveries on the pathogenesis and therapy of leukemia on the cellular and molecular level. She cloned the m-BCR (minor breakpoint cluster region) of the BCR gene and discovered a new type of APL (acute promyelocytic leukemia) and new "nonrandom chromosomal translocations" of leukemia. Based on her discoveries, she developed a new therapy that turned previously fatal APL into a highly curable disease, and made progress toward curing other types of leukemia. She has published more than 300 research papers in peer-reviewed journals.

== Honours and recognition ==
For her contributions to medical research, Chen was elected an academician of the Chinese Academy of Engineering in 2003 and The World Academy of Sciences in 2007. She was also elected a foreign associate of the French Académie Nationale de Médecine and a fellow of the Royal College of Physicians of the UK.

Chen has won numerous awards including the Ho Leung Ho Lee Prize for Medical Sciences and Meteria Medica (2001), State Natural Science Award, Second Class (2001), and Top Ten Women Elites of China (2005). She was elected a delegate to the 10th and 11th National People's Congresses.

== Family ==
Chen Saijuan's husband, Chen Zhu, is also a renowned hematologist who has served as China's Minister of Health and President of the Red Cross Society of China. They have a son named Chen Shuo (陈硕), who is also a student of medicine.
