= Ma Xiaowei =

Chinese politician and president of the Chinese Medical Association

- 马晓伟
- Ma in January 2020

Head of the National Health Commission
- In office 19 March 2018 – 6 May 2024
- Premier: Li Keqiang; Li Qiang
- Preceded by: New position
- Succeeded by: Lei Haichao

President of the Chinese Medical Association
- In office December 2015 – May 2021
- Preceded by: Chen Zhu
- Succeeded by: Zhao Yupei

Personal details
- Born: December 1959 (age 66) Wutai County, Shanxi, China
- Party: Chinese Communist Party
- Education: China Medical University
- Profession: Physician

Chinese name
- Traditional Chinese: 馬曉偉
- Simplified Chinese: 马晓伟
Transcriptions
Standard Mandarin
- Hanyu Pinyin: Mǎ Xiǎowěi

Ma Xiaowei (Chinese: 马晓伟; born December 1959) is a Chinese physician and politician who has served as the head of the National Health Commission of China between March 2018 and May 2024. Ma also served as president of the Chinese Medical Association from 2015 to 2021. He is one of the vice presidents of the Red Cross Society of China.

== Biography ==
Ma was born in Wutai County, Shanxi in December 1959. He is part of the Han ethnic group.

In April 1978, he was accepted to China Medical University. Upon graduation in December 1982, he was assigned to work at the Ministry of Health. He joined the Chinese Communist Party (CCP) in 1982. He became a cadre at the then Ministry of Health before working for China Medical University where he later served as hospital administrator and party secretary. He also became the director of Liaoning Provincial Health Department.

In October 2001, he was appointed Vice Minister of Health. When the ministry was reorganized into the National Health and Family Planning Commission, he continued to serve as deputy director. In May 2015, he concurrently served as vice-president of the Red Cross Society of China. On December 15, 2015, he was appointed president of Chinese Medical Association, replacing Chen Zhu. On 19 March 2018, Ma was appointed head of the National Health Commission at the first session of the 13th National People's Congress. Ma has been one of the leading figures in the fight against COVID-19 pandemic as well as communication around it.

Academic offices
Preceded by Prof. Chen Zhu	President of Chinese Medical Association; 2015–2021	Succeeded by Zhao Yupei
Government offices
Preceded by Li Bin as Head of the National Health and Family Planning Commission	Head of the National Health Commission; 2018–2024	Succeeded by Lei Haichao
