= Zhao Yupei =

Chinese surgeon and politician

- 赵玉沛

President of the Chinese Medical Association
- Incumbent
- Assumed office May 2021
- Preceded by: Ma Xiaowei

President of Peking Union Medical College Hospital
- In office December 2007 – November 2020
- Preceded by: Liu Qian
- Succeeded by: Zhang Shuyang

Personal details
- Born: July 1954 (age 72) Changchun, Jilin, China
- Party: Chinese Communist Party
- Education: Norman Bethune Health Science Center of Jilin University; Graduate School of Peking Union Medical College
- Scientific career
- Fields: Surgery
- Workplaces: Beijing Union Medical College Hospital; Chinese Medical Association

Chinese name
- Simplified Chinese: 赵玉沛
- Traditional Chinese: 趙玉沛
Transcriptions
Standard Mandarin
- Hanyu Pinyin: Zhào Yùpèi

Zhao Yupei (Chinese: 赵玉沛; born July 1954) is a Chinese surgeon and politician who is the current president of the Chinese Medical Association, in office since May 2021. Previously he served as president of Peking Union Medical College Hospital.

He was an alternate of the 18th and 19th Central Committee of the Chinese Communist Party.

== Biography ==
Zhao was born in Changchun, Jilin, in July 1954. He graduated from Norman Bethune Medical University (now Norman Bethune Health Science Center of Jilin University) in 1982 before gaining a master's degree in medical science from China Union Medical University (now Graduate School of Peking Union Medical College) in 1987.

Starting in 1987, he served in several posts in Peking Union Medical College Hospital, including deputy director and then director of Surgery, deputy dean of Department of Surgery. In December 2007, he was promoted to become president of Peking Union Medical College Hospital, a position he held until November 2020. In May 2021, he was chosen as president of the Chinese Medical Association, replacing Ma Xiaowei.

== Honours and awards ==
- 2005 Member of the American College of Surgeons
- 2007 Honorary Fellowship of the Royal College of Surgery, England
- 2010 Science and Technology Progress Award of the Ho Leung Ho Lee Foundation
- December 2011 Member of the Chinese Academy of Sciences (CAS)

Civic offices
Preceded by Liu Qian	President of Beijing Union Medical College Hospital; 2007–2020	Succeeded by Zhang Shuyang
Preceded by Ma Xiaowei	President of the Chinese Medical Association; 2021–	Incumbent
