= Lin Qiaozhi =

Chinese physician

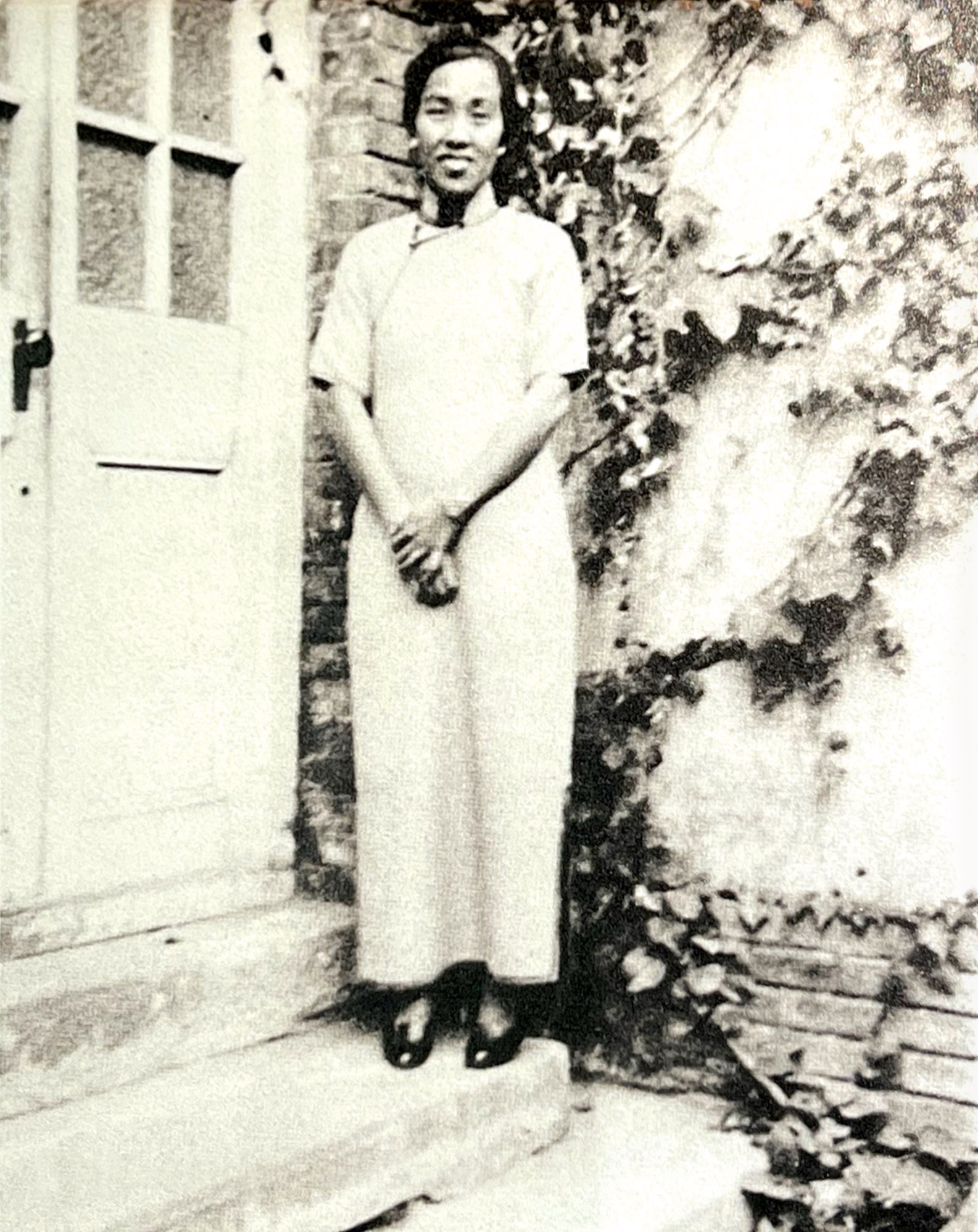
- Lin in 1934
- Born: December 23, 1901; Xiamen, Fujian, Qing dynasty
- Died: April 22, 1983 (aged 81); PUMC Hospital, Beijing, China
- Education: Fukien Provincial Female Normal School; Yenching University; Peking Union Medical College
- Medical career
- Institutions: PUMC Hospital; Beijing Obstetrics & Gynecology Hospital
- Sub-specialties: Obstetrics and Gynecology

Lin Qiaozhi or Kha-ti Lim (Chinese: 林巧稚; pinyin: Lín Qiǎozhì; Pe̍h-ōe-jī: Lîm Khá-tī; December 23, 1901 – April 22, 1983) was a Chinese obstetrician and gynecologist at the Peking Union Medical College Hospital. She conducted research in the fields of fetal breathing, female pelvic diseases, gynecologic oncology and neonatal hemolytic disorders. She revolutionized modern Chinese gynecology and oncology. As an obstetrician, she delivered over 50,000 babies in her career. She never married or had children of her own, but always wrote "Lin Qiaozhi's Baby" on the newborns' name tags, resulting in her being nicknamed "Mother of Ten Thousand Babies (万婴之母)" . She died in Beijing on April 23, 1983.

Lin was elected to the Chinese Academy of Sciences as the only female academician in the first batch of members in 1955. She also served as a delegate to the 1st through 5th National People's Congresses. She was a member of the 3rd, 4th and 5th Standing Committee of the National People's Congress.

== Early life and education ==
Lin was born at Gulangyu on December 23, 1901. She came from a Westernized and Christian background, which shared with PUMC, hence she had a desire to be enrolled at the latter. She arrived in Shanghai to take the Pre-Medical Entrance Test of the college in 1921. Conducting the aid of a fainted damsel interrupted completing her paper. Still, the college admired her selflessness and admitted her eventually as a special case.

Lin won the Walter A. Hawley scholarship (Chinese: 文海奖学金) to the PUMC as the best graduate in 1929, which was considerable and might amount to the annual salary of an assistant resident.

== Career ==
Lin became the first native female physician hired as an assistant resident in the Department of Obstetrics and Gynecology, PUMC hospital.

Lin took advanced training in London and Manchester in 1932, she went to Vienna in the next year as a visiting scholar. In 1939, Lin went to Chicago University Medical School to continue her research. Meantime, Lin focused on the placenta praevia and placental abruption.

Upon return to PUMC, Lin became the first native female to be appointed director of a hospital department of obstetrics and gynecology. Since the Pacific War broke out, the hospital was closed by the Japanese military, Lin initiated personal practice at her residence, 10 Dongtangzi Hutong, where she completed a total of 8,887 medical records.

=== Lin's attitude towards her patients ===
Lin used to tell her students and residents that only if a physician watched by his/her patient's bed, he/she will feel esteemed by his/her patient, while the patient feels the care and concern from the physician.

The object of the physician is a real living human...the medical treatment aimed at mending rather than fixing, it is important to get close to the patients on a face to face basis rather than merely to be a skilful mechanic.

(医生的对象是活生生的人……看病不是修理机器，医生不能做纯技术专家，要到病人那里做面对面的工作)

=== Lin's attitude towards pregnant women ===
When a pregnant woman had contractions, Lin always comforted her. She preferred putting her ear against her abdomen gently to using a stethoscope to catch the fetus's heart beating. It was believed to be a way to dispel her fear or to narrow the gap.

Lin trusted that "better to be early than late" for the antenatal check-up. In the 1970s, there was once a pregnant woman who delayed her first antenatal check-up to the 7th month. She was angry, and regarded it as a shame for an obstetrician and gynecologist, since she blamed the situation on her negligent manner.

== Death and posthumous recognition ==
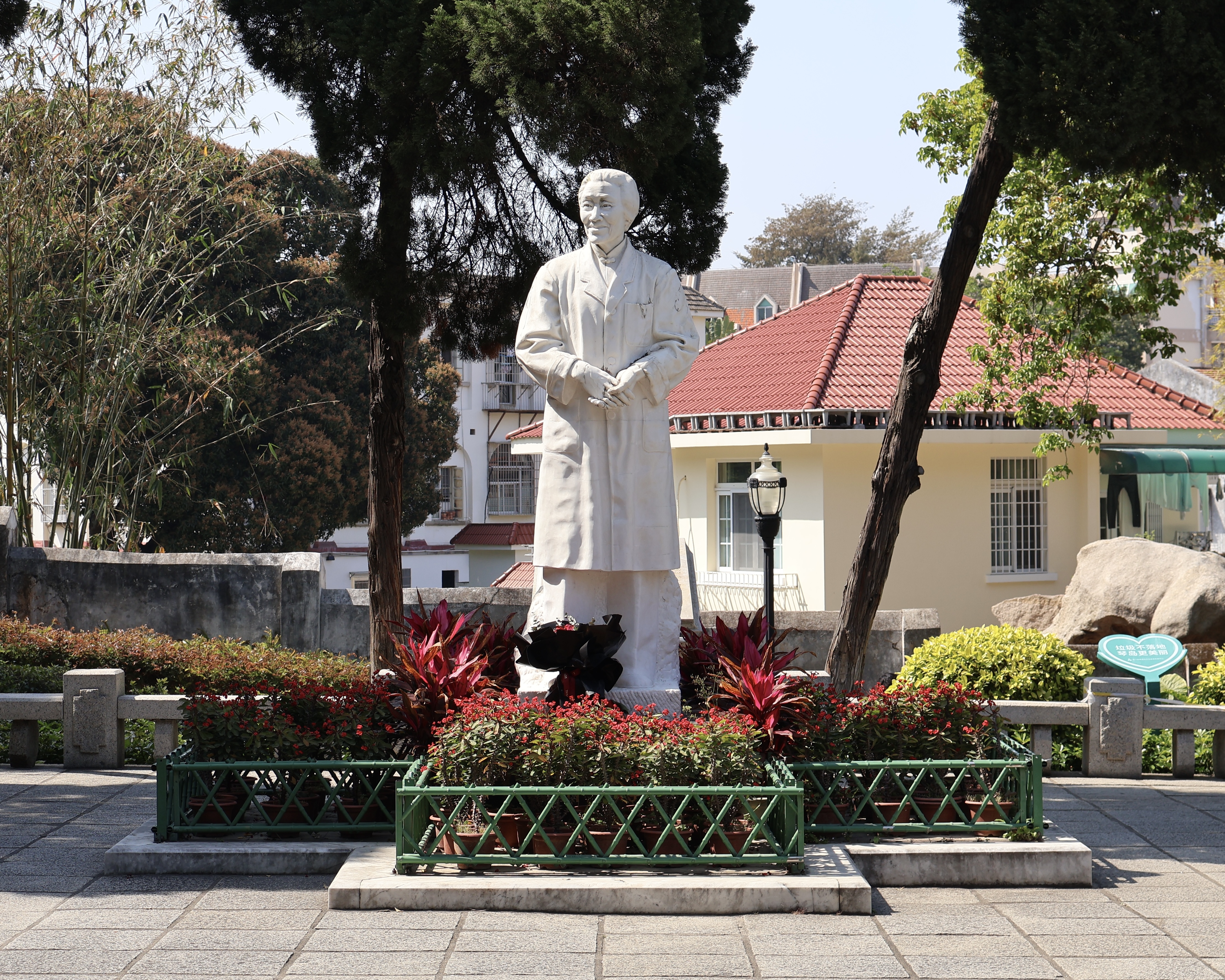
Statue of Lin Qiaozhi at Gulangyu

Lin suffered from several diseases later in life. She died on April 22, 1983, at the PUMC Hospital. She donated her body for anatomical teaching. Later, her ashes were scattered over the sea. She left money to be used for a kindergarten and to endow a fund to award a young resident.

On the seventh anniversary of Lin's death in 1990, China Post issued a commemorative stamp to honour her.

== Personal life ==
Lin never married. To some extent it might be attributed to the hospital authority that used to believe that career and marriage are mutually exclusive for a young doctor. She lived at Waijiaobu Road, No.59 with her niece Lin Xinkeng (Chinese: 林心鏗), and the latter's husband Zhou Huakang (Chinese: 周華康) until she died.

Lin was known for her love of coffee, to the extent that Zhou Enlai once gave her some as a gift.

Lin and Peng Zhen's family had an amicable relationship.

== Scientific papers ==
The effect of respiration stimulants in the newborn infant, Am. J. Obst. & Gynec., 50: 146–153, 1945

== Family ==
Lin's father spent his most of his early days in Singapore, then he returned Xiamen and became an English teacher.
