= Yang Chongrui =

Chinese obstetrician

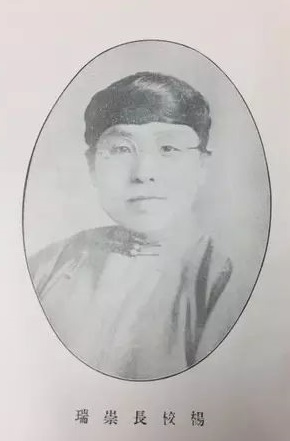
- Chongrui in 1928
- Born: 1891
- Died: 20 July 1983 (aged 91–92)
- Citizenship: China
- Education: Peking Union Medical College; Johns Hopkins University
- Medical career
- Sub-specialties: Obstetrics; Women's Health

Yang Chongrui (Chinese: 杨崇瑞; pinyin: Yáng Chóngruì), also known as Marion Yang, was a Chinese obstetrician who is credited with modernising women's healthcare in China. Her contributions to the field of obstetrics and her training of midwives and nurses led to a significant decrease in deaths relating to pregnancy. Between 1949 and 1954 the percentage of women dying through childbirth dropped from 0.7% to 0.05%, while infant mortality was reduced from 11.7% to 4.6%.

== Biography ==
Yang was born in 1891 in Tongzhou District, Beijing to a family of farmers. Her father was well educated, having passed governments exams at the age of eighteen and became a government official candidate. Yang graduated with a degree in medicine from a Peking Union Medical College and chose to practice at a hospital in Dezhou, Shandong Province.

Moving back to Beijing six years later she worked in the obstetrics and gynecology department at the Peking Union Medical College Hospital where she worked to decrease infant mortality. To expand her knowledge, the hospital sent Yang to the United States to learn about more modern childbirth techniques at Johns Hopkins University.

After graduating in 1927 she returned to China and organised a number of training sessions for childbirth assistants to teach them the importance of cleanliness and how to care for newborn babies. Under Yang's advice the government established a midwifery education committee in 1929 and opened the nation's first midwifery school with Yang as its principal. By the late 1930s, more than 60 midwifery schools were set up across China and with scholarships provided by the Rockefeller Foundation many doctors went to study midwifery in England.

In 1930, Yang established a birth control clinic in Beijing. Yang's clinic offered diaphragms, sponges, and vaginal plugs (yindaosai). While Yang's primary goal in operating the birth control clinic was to assist working class women, most of the women who came to the clinic were from middle and upper class backgrounds.

In 1934 Yang was appointed as a director of the Maternal and Infant Health department in a newly established government Central Health Experiment Division. After war broke out she worked in Hankou, Hubei Province then Guiyang, Guizhou Province before traveling to the wartime capital Chongqing to open a medical school. In 1939 she caught typhoid fever and went to the United States to seek treatment, while here she continued her studies of obstetrics while recovering. After returning to China years later to re-open the midwifery schools she was invited by officials of the newly founded People's Republic of China to become director of the Bureau of Maternal and Infant Health under the Ministry of Health. After meeting with Mao Zedong and Zhou Enlai she accepted the role and went about creating a network of clinics across China to promote pre- and post-natal care.

Yang died in 1983 at the age of 93. A statue of her was erected in 1999 at Dongcheng District Maternal and Child Health Hospital in Beijing to commemorate her contributions to Women's healthcare.
