= Wang Zhenyi =

Chinese pathophysiologist and hematologist (born 1924)

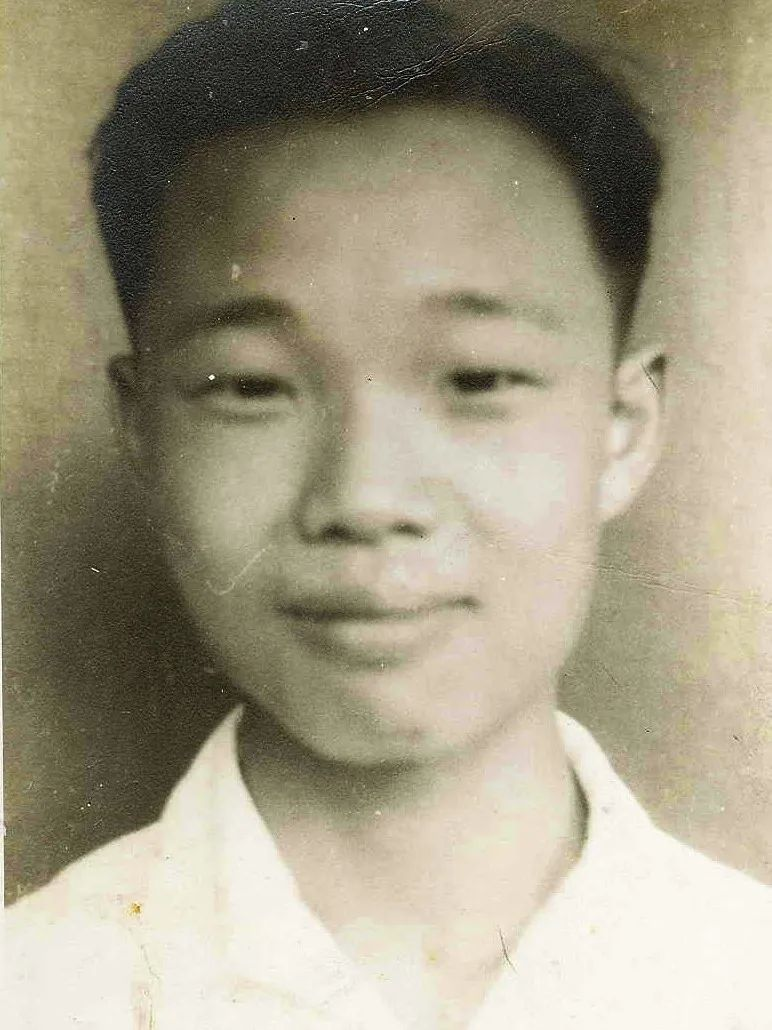
- Wang Zhenyi in 1940
- Born: November 30, 1924 (age 101); Xinghua, Jiangsu, China
- Education: Aurora University; Columbia University
- Scientific career
- Fields: Pathophysiology; Hematology
- Workplaces: Shanghai Jiao Tong University School of Medicine

Chinese name
- Traditional Chinese: 王振義
- Simplified Chinese: 王振义
Transcriptions
Standard Mandarin
- Hanyu Pinyin: Wáng Zhènyì

Wang Zhenyi (Chinese: 王振义; pinyin: Wáng Zhènyì; born November 30, 1924), also known as Zhen-yi Wang, is a Chinese pathophysiologist and hematologist who is a professor emeritus of Medicine and Pathophysiology at the Shanghai Jiao Tong University (SJTU). He is most well known for discovering the cure for acute promyelocytic leukemia while working with Laurent Degos in France, using tretinoin on a trial of 24 patients at Ruijin Hospital in 1986.

Wang was bestowed the Medal of the Republic, the highest honorary medal of the People's Republic of China, in September 2024.

== Biography ==
Wang was born in November 1924 in Xinghua, Jiangsu, with his ancestral hometown in Yixing, Jiangsu Province. Wang graduated from the Aurora University in Shanghai in 1948 and obtained his M.D. degree.

From 1948 to 1960, Wang completed his residency and worked as a physician at Ruijin Hospital in Shanghai. From 1960 to 1982, Wang taught at Shanghai Second Medical University (now Medical School of Shanghai Jiao Tong University), and was the dean of its pathology and physiology departments. From 1982 to 1984, Wang was the director of the Division of Basic Medicine of Shanghai Second Medical University. From 1984 to 1988, Wang was the president of Shanghai Second Medical University. From 1987 to 1996, Wang was the Director of Shanghai Institute of Hematology (SIH). Wang now is the Honorary Director of SIH.

Wang's research has led to the improved survival of patients with acute promyelocytic leukemia (APML). Wang is the author of more than 300 scientific papers and books.

Chen Zhu (former Minister of Health of China) and his wife Chen Saijuan are both hematologists and former students of Wang.

== Awards and honors ==
- 1992: Foreign Member, French Academy of Sciences, France
- 1993: Légion d'honneur, France,
- 1994: Kettering Prize for Cytodifferentiation Therapy,
- 1994: Member, Chinese Academy of Engineering,
- 1997: Charles Rodolphe Brupbacher Prize given for his "extraordinary contributions to basic oncological research." Switzerland,
- 1998: Prix mondial Cino Del Duca for Science, France,
- 2000: Qiushi Distinguished Scientist Award, Hong Kong
- 2000: ISI Citation Classic Award
- 2001: Honorary Doctor of Science degree from Columbia University, USA
- 2003: Ham-Wasserman Lecturer, American Society of Hematology (ASH)
- 2020: Future Science Prize
- 2021: Asian Scientist 100, Asian Scientist
- 2024: Medal of the Republic (China), P.R. China

Wang is also a member of the Chinese Society of Pathophysiology, and the International Society of Fibrinolysis.

== See also ==
- Chen Zhu
- Yuet Wai Kan
- Hematology
- Acute myeloid leukemia
