= Li Bin (politician) =

Chinese politician

- 李斌
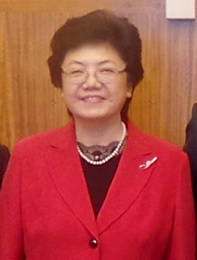
- Li in 2013

Vice Chairwoman of the Chinese People's Political Consultative Conference
- In office 14 March 2018 – 10 March 2023
- Chairman: Wang Yang

Secretary-General of the National Committee of the Chinese People's Political Consultative Conference
- In office 27 May 2020 – 10 March 2023
- Chairman: Wang Yang
- Preceded by: Xia Baolong
- Succeeded by: Wang Dongfeng

Head of the National Health and Family Planning Commission
- In office 16 March 2013 – 19 March 2018
- Premier: Li Keqiang
- Preceded by: Chen Zhu (as Minister of Health)
- Succeeded by: Ma Xiaowei (as Director of the National Health Commission)

Governor of Anhui
- In office 11 December 2011 – 27 March 2013
- Preceded by: Wang Sanyun
- Succeeded by: Wang Xuejun

Personal details
- Born: October 1954 (age 71–72) Fushun, Liaoning
- Party: Chinese Communist Party
- Education: Jilin University

Li Bin (Chinese: 李斌; pinyin: Lǐ Bīn; born October 1954) is a Chinese politician of Manchu descent from Fushun, in Liaoning province. She was the only Minister in charge of the National Health and Family Planning Commission existing from March 2013 to March 2018. She served as one of the vice-chairpersons of the 13th National Committee of the Chinese People's Political Consultative Conference from March 2018 to March 2023.

== Biography ==
She graduated from Jilin University with a degree in economics, and went on to receive her doctorate and conduct research in the same field. Li is a member of the Chinese Communist Party. She was chairperson and party secretary of the National Population and Family Planning Commission (2008–2011). She became vice- and acting governor of Anhui province in 2011, and was Governor of the province from February 2012 to March 2013. She is only the fourth woman to assume the Governorship of a provincial level division in China, following Gu Xiulian, Uyunqimg and Song Xiuyan.

After graduating from Jilin University, Li continued to work in Jilin province. During her thirty years working in the province, Li worked in a variety of roles, including as deputy governor. In August 2007, she became the deputy chairperson and party secretary of the National Population and Family Planning Commission. She was promoted to Chairperson in March 2008.

At the first plenary session of the 12th National People's Congress in March 2013, she was elected as the first chairperson of the newly formed National Health and Family Planning Commission.

Li was a member of the 17th, 18th, and 19th Central Committees of the Chinese Communist Party.

Government offices
Previous: Chen Zhu as Minister of Health	Head of the National Health and Family Planning Commission; March 2013 – March 2018	Next: Ma Xiaowei as Minister in charge of the National Health Commission
Previous: Wang Xia as Minister in charge of the National Population and Family Planning Commission	Head of the National Health and Family Planning Commission; March 2013 – March 2018	Next: Ma Xiaowei as Minister in charge of the National Health Commission
