= Gao Qiang =

Chinese politician

Gao Qiang (Chinese: 高强; pinyin: Gāo Qiáng; born 1944) is a Chinese politician and a former minister and Chinese Communist Party Committee Secretary of the Ministry of Health.

== Early life and education ==
Gao is of Han ethnicity and is originally from an administrative county of Cangzhou, in Hebei province. Gao is a graduate of Renmin University, with a degree in World economics.

== Career ==
Gao commenced work in 1967 and joined the Chinese Communist Party (CCP) in 1978.

Gao worked in a variety of economics posts within the CCP, including under the Ministry of Finance. In 2001 he became the assistant secretary to the State Council of the People's Republic of China and the director of an office under it. In 2003, Gao became the CCP Committee Secretary for the Ministry of Health, and the deputy minister of its standing committee. On April 27, 2005, he was made the acting minister of health after the departure of Wu Yi. On June 29, 2007, a new minister was appointed, and Gao was demoted to deputy minister. He retained his position as the ministry's CCP Committee Secretary. In 2009, Gao stepped down from the Ministry of Health, but soon after was appointed deputy director of the Finance Committee and director of the budget committee of the National People's Congress.

Government offices
Preceded by Wu Yi as Vice Premier and Minister of Health	Minister of Health; 2005–2007	Succeeded by Prof. Chen Zhu
