= Chen Zhu =

Chinese hematologist, molecular biologist and politician

Chen Zhu ForMemRS
- 陈竺
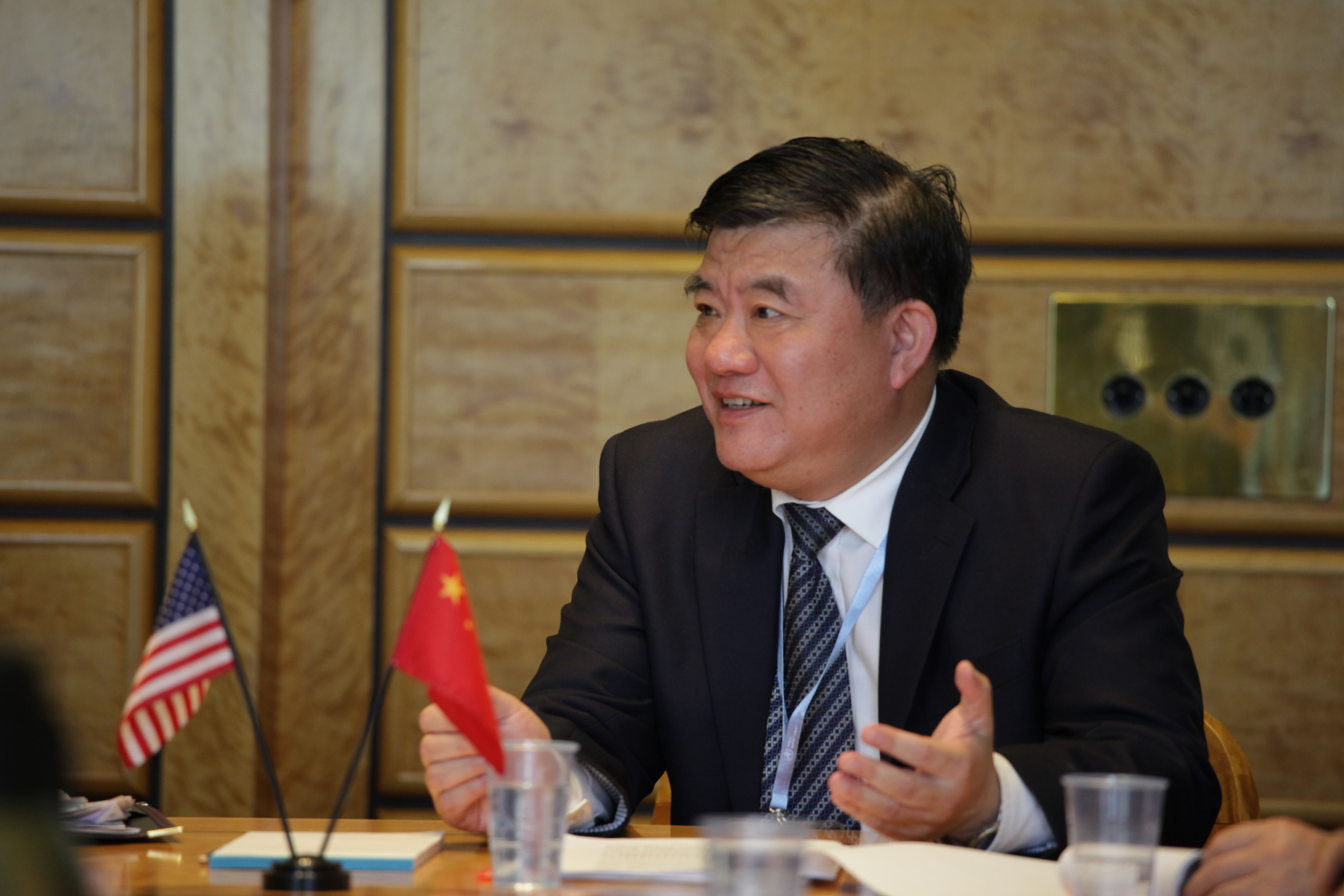
- Chen Zhu (2011)

Vice Chairman of the Standing Committee of the National People's Congress
- In office 14 March 2013 – 10 March 2023
- Chairman: Zhang Dejiang; Li Zhanshu

Chairman of the Chinese Peasants' and Workers' Democratic Party
- In office December 2012 – 9 December 2022
- Preceded by: Sang Guowei
- Succeeded by: He Wei

Minister of Health
- In office June 2007 – March 2013
- Preceded by: Gao Qiang
- Succeeded by: Li Bin (as Minister in charge of the National Health and Family Planning Commission)

President of the Red Cross Society of China
- In office 6 June 2015 – 10 October 2024
- Preceded by: Hua Jianmin
- Succeeded by: He Wei

President of Chinese Medical Association
- In office 2010–2015
- Preceded by: Zhong Nanshan
- Succeeded by: Ma Xiaowei

President of the Western Returned Scholars Association
- In office 2013–2021
- Preceded by: Han Qide
- Succeeded by: Ding Zhongli

Personal details
- Born: August 17, 1953 (age 73) Shanghai, China
- Party: Chinese Peasants' and Workers' Democratic Party
- Education: Jiangxi Provincial Shangrao Health School; Shanghai Second Medical University; Paris Diderot University (DSc)
- Awards: Chevalier of the Legion of Honour
- Scientific career
- Fields: Hematology, Molecular biology

Chen Zhu ForMemRS (Chinese: 陈竺; pinyin: Chén Zhú; born August 17, 1953) is a Chinese hematologist and molecular biologist who has served as the president of the Red Cross Society of China from 2015 to 2024.

He previously served as vice chairman of the National People's Congress Standing Committee from 2013 to 2023, chairman of the Chinese Peasants' and Workers' Democratic Party Central Committee from 2012 to 2022, president of the Chinese Medical Association from 2010 to 2015, Minister of Heath from 2007 to 2013, and vice president of the Chinese Academy of Sciences from 2000 to 2007.

In the academia, he is academician of the Chinese Academy of Sciences, foreign fellow of the Royal Society, foreign member of the United States National Academy of Sciences, and foreign member of the French Academy of Sciences. He also holds a professorship at the Shanghai Jiao Tong University School of Medicine.

== Biography ==
Chen was born in Shanghai in August 1953 and his ancestral hometown is Zhenjiang, Jiangsu Province.

Chen began his medical career by spending five years in rural China as a barefoot doctor. Chen then obtained his master's degree from the Shanghai Second Medical Sciences University (now the medical school of Shanghai Jiao Tong University) in September, 1981. He obtained his Ph.D. from the Paris Diderot University (Paris 7) in Paris, France. Chen completed his medical residency and postdoctoral research at the same university and its teaching hospital.

Chen is former President of the Shanghai Institute of Hematology and former Director-general of the China Human Genome Center (South) in Shanghai.

On 10 October 2024, he was succeeded by He Wei as the president of the Red Cross Society of China.

== Honors and awards ==
Chen is an Academician of the Chinese Academy of Sciences, foreign associate of the United States National Academy of Sciences, foreign member of the US Institute of Medicine, foreign member of the French Academy of Sciences, and a member of The World Academy of Sciences (TWAS). Chen is also a Member of the European Academy of Arts, Sciences and Humanities. He was elected an Honorary Fellows of the UK Academy of Medical Sciences in 2008.

Chen was awarded the State Scientific and Technological Award by the Chinese government and the "Prix de l'Qise" by "La Ligue Nationale contre le Cancer" of France (he is the first non-French winner).

In 2002, Chen received the Legion of Honour from French Government. In 2005, Chen was given an honorary doctor of science by the University of Hong Kong.

In 2010, Chen was awarded an honorary degree (Doctor of the university) by the University of York, England, at a ceremony in Beijing.

In 2012, Chen was awarded the 7th Annual Szent-Györgyi Prize for Progress in Cancer Research by the National Foundation for Cancer Research. He was elected as a Fellow of the Royal Society in 2013.

In 2018, Chen was awarded the Sjöberg Prize by the Royal Swedish Academy of Sciences "for the clarification of molecular mechanisms and the development of a revolutionary treatment for acute promyelocytic leukaemia". He shared the prize and the prize amount of one million US dollars with cancer researchers Anne Dejean and Hugues de Thé.

In 2026 he received the Shaw Prize in Life Sciences jointly with Anne Dejean and Hugues de Thé.

=== U.S. sanctions ===
On December 8, 2020, Chen Zhu, together with all 13 other vice chairpersons of the National People's Congress of China was designated by US Department of State as connected with the National Security Law (NSL), pursuant to Executive Order (E.O.) 13936, "The President's Executive Order on Hong Kong Normalization", and added to OFAC's SDN List.

== Family ==
Chen Zhu's father Chen Jialun (陈家伦) and mother Xu Manyin (许曼音) are both prominent doctors and medical professors in Shanghai. He is the eldest of three children. His youngest brother, Chen Zhen (1955–2000), was a globally recognized artist based in France. He also has a sister named Chen Jian (陈简). Chen Zhu's wife Chen Saijuan is also a well-known hematologist and an academician of the Chinese Academy of Engineering. The couple have a son. Both Chen and his wife studied under Wang Zhenyi.

Party political offices
Previous: Sang Guowei	Chairman of the Chinese Peasants' and Workers' Democratic Party; 2012–2022	Succeeded by He Wei
Government offices
Previous: Gao Qiang	Minister of Health; 2007–2013	Next: Li Bin as Minister in charge of the National Health and Family Planning Commission
Academic offices
Previous: Prof. Zhong Nanshan	President of Chinese Medical Association; 2010–2015	Next: Ma Xiaowei
