= Wu Yi (politician) =

Chinese politician

- 吴仪
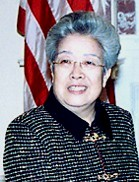
- Wu in 2004

Vice Premier of China
- In office 17 March 2003 – 17 March 2008 Serving with Huang Ju, Zeng Peiyan, and Hui Liangyu
- Premier: Wen Jiabao

State Councilor of China
- In office 18 March 1998 – 16 March 2003
- Premier: Zhu Rongji

Minister of Health
- In office April 2003 – April 2005
- Premier: Wen Jiabao
- Preceded by: Zhang Wenkang
- Succeeded by: Gao Qiang

Minister of Foreign Trade and Economic Co-operation
- In office March 1993 – March 1998
- Premier: Li Peng
- Preceded by: Li Lanqing
- Succeeded by: Shi Guangsheng

Personal details
- Born: November 1938 (age 87) Wuhan, Republic of China
- Party: Chinese Communist Party (1962–)
- Education: China University of Petroleum

Wu Yi
- Traditional Chinese: 吳儀
- Simplified Chinese: 吴仪
Transcriptions
Standard Mandarin
- Hanyu Pinyin: Wú Yí

Wu Yi (born November 1938) is a retired Chinese politician who served as a Vice Premier of China between 2003 and 2008. She was one of the country's most visible leaders during the first decade of the 21st century, best known for taking on the role of Minister of Health from April 2003 during the SARS outbreak, shortly after becoming vice premier. She was also a member of the Politburo of the Chinese Communist Party. She has since retired and left public life. She was commonly referred to as the "iron lady" by Chinese media, and was known to be a tough negotiator internationally. Forbes magazine ranked her the world's second-most powerful woman in 2004, 2005, and 2007.

== Early life ==
Wu was born in November 1938 to an ordinary intellectual family based in Wuhan, but she traces her ancestry to nearby Huangmei County in Hubei province. She was the younger of two children. Her parents died while she was young, so she was brought up by her brother, who was eight years her senior. In April 1962, she joined the Chinese Communist Party. In August of the same year, she graduated from the Petroleum Refinery department at the Beijing Petroleum Institute, with a degree in petroleum engineering. She spent much of her career as a petroleum technician, eventually becoming deputy manager at the Beijing Dongfang Hong refinery, and assistant manager and party secretary at the Beijing Yanshan Petrochemical Corporation.

== Career ==
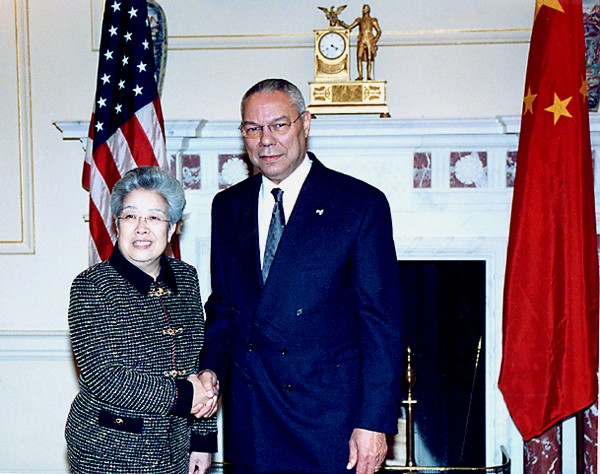
Wu Yi with US Secretary of State Colin Powell

She was elected deputy mayor of Beijing in 1988, and held that office until 1991. Following the Tiananmen Square protests of 1989, she persuaded coal workers threatening to go on strike to continue working after some of their colleagues had been killed. From 1991 until 1998, she held successively the posts of Deputy Minister of Foreign Economic Relations and Trade, Minister of Foreign Trade and Economic Co-operation, and member of the 14th and 15th Central Committees of the Chinese Communist Party. A protégé of Zhu Rongji, she became a State Councilor in 1998, and was appointed Vice Premier of the State Council in Wen Jiabao government in March 2003. She was the first woman to hold the position since the reform and opening up began in 1978, and arguably the most powerful woman in Chinese politics since Deng Yingchao. She helped negotiate the PRC's entry into the World Trade Organization and re-organised the customs service after U.S. complaints over the widespread violation of intellectual property rights.

During the SARS crisis, she replaced Zhang Wenkang, who had been fired for his role in the cover-up of the crisis, as health minister. She headed a committee to solve the crisis. Wu was praised internationally for her handling of the crisis. She was called the "Goddess of Transparency" by Time magazine for her leadership during the SARS crisis and named one of the Time 100 Most Influential People of 2004.

In early 2007, an ailing Huang Ju, who was serving as senior Vice Premier at the time, could no longer continue fulfilling his duties. It was reported that Wu Yi would take over work in the financial sector which was formerly the portfolio of Huang. After Huang died in office in June 2007 Wu became the senior-most ranked Vice Premier. Also in 2007, a coordination committee was formed to oversee quality control of consumer goods as well as food safety, and Wu was named its leader. There was speculation that Wu may continue to serve despite having reached the informal retirement age of 68.

At the 17th National Congress of the Chinese Communist Party, Wu was not named to the new Politburo. A month later, answering speculation about her political future at a U.S.-China Chamber of Commerce meeting, Wu said that she intends to "retire completely" (i.e., luotui), and said that she will not take on any office, whether "official, semi-official, or with civic organizations." She also remarked that she wanted everyone to simply forget about her. During the last few months of her tenure she was involved in negotiations with U.S. toy giant Mattel over toy lead content that damaged the reputation of Chinese-made products. At a meeting held with Chinese business leaders in early 2008 Wu revealed that her personal salary totaled 120,000 yuan, or approximately $17,600 per year at the time, and told the business leaders that they should only "take money from the right places".

Wu retired from politics in March 2008 after she stepped down as Vice Premier.

== Public image and personal life ==
Called by Chinese media as the "Iron Lady of China", Wu was regarded as a firm and direct woman who, unlike her mostly male colleagues, chose not to dye her graying hair black. Wu did not marry all her life. When questioned about this, Wu said, "it's not that I have always wanted to be alone, it's just that life has never given me the opportunity [for romance]; no one has ever entered my life in this way."

Forbes magazine considered her the second most powerful woman in the world in 2004, 2005 and 2007 and the third most powerful in 2006.

Government offices
Preceded by Huang Ju	First-ranked Vice-Premier of the State Council; Acting; 2007–2008	Succeeded by Li Keqiang
Preceded by Li Lanqing; Qian Qichen; Wu Bangguo; Wen Jiabao	Vice-Premier of the State Council; 15 March 2003 – 17 March 2008; Served alongside: Huang Ju; Zeng Peiyan; Hui Liangyu	Succeeded by Li Keqiang; Hui Liangyu; Zhang Dejiang; Wang Qishan
Preceded by Zhang Wenkang	Minister of Health; 26 April 2003 (SARS crisis) – 27 April 2005	Succeeded by Gao Qiang
Preceded by Li Lanqing	Minister of Foreign Trade and Economic Cooperation; 1993–1998	Succeeded by Shi Guangsheng
