= Lei Haichao =

Chinese politician

- 雷海潮
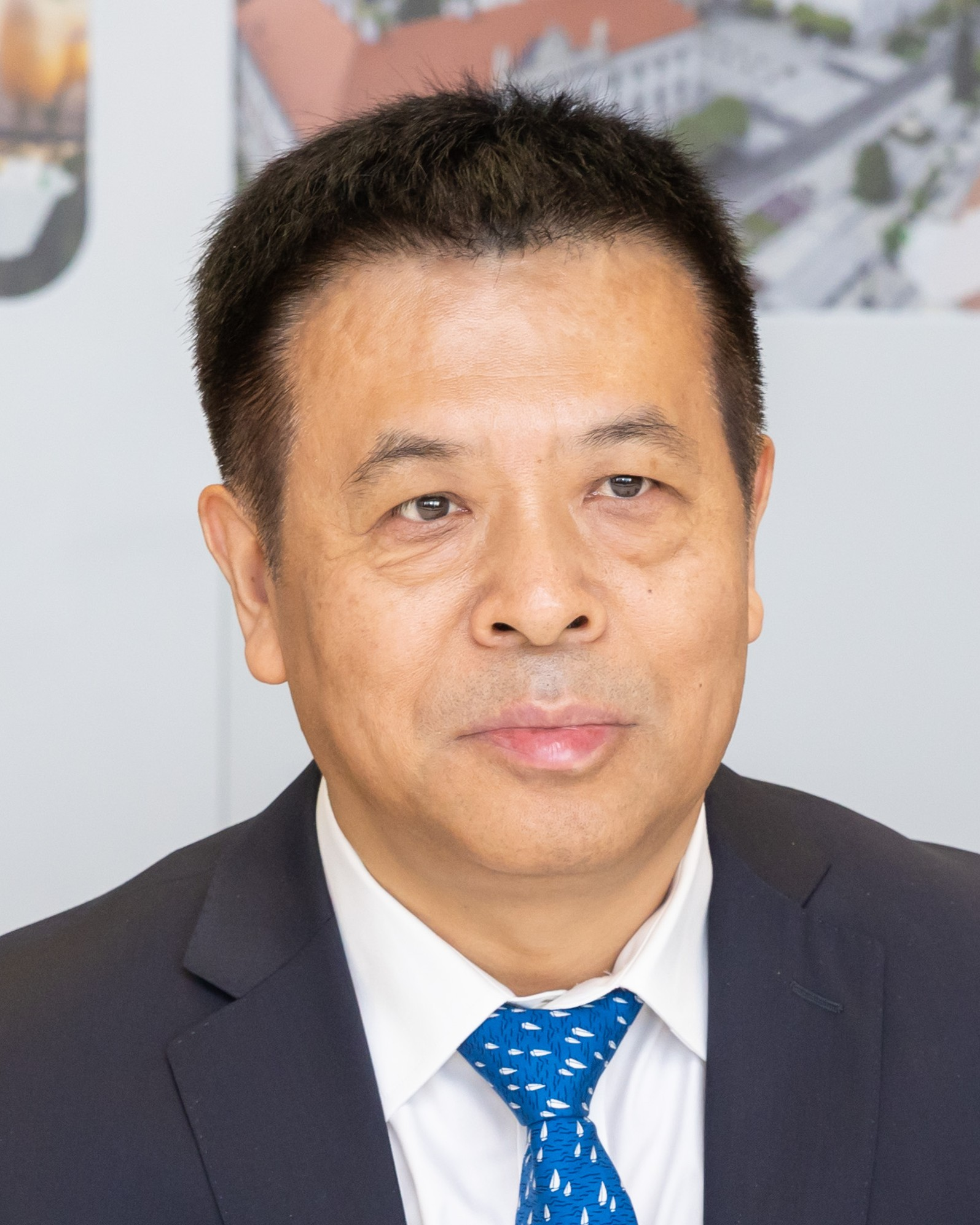
- Lei in 2026

Minister of the National Health Commission
- Incumbent
- Assumed office 28 June 2024
- Premier: Li Qiang
- Preceded by: Ma Xiaowei

Director of the Beijing Municipal Health Commission
- In office November 2018 – November 2020
- Preceded by: New title
- Succeeded by: Yu Luming

Personal details
- Born: April 1968 (age 58) Dezhou, Shandong, China
- Party: Chinese Communist Party
- Education: Shandong Second Medical University; Shandong University; Shanghai Medical College, Fudan University

Lei Haichao (Chinese: 雷海潮; pinyin: Léi Hǎicháo; born April 1968) is a Chinese public health expert and politician, currently serving as the head and party secretary of the National Health Commission, in office since May 2024. He served as a member of the World Health Organization's Western Pacific region health research advisory committee from 2005 to 2008.

== Early life and education ==
Lei was born in Dezhou, Shandong, in April 1968, and successively graduated from Weifang Medical University (now Shandong Second Medical University), Shandong Medical University (now Shandong University), and Shanghai Medical University (now Shanghai Medical College, Fudan University).

== Career ==
Lei entered the workforce in July 1991, and joined the Chinese Communist Party (CCP) in March 1996. He became an official in the Ministry of Health in September 2004, and worked for almost six years. In July 2010, he was named deputy director of the Beijing Municipal Health Bureau (was reshuffled as Beijing Municipal Health Commission), rising to director in May 2017. He was deputy minister of the National Health Commission in October 2020, in addition to serving as party branch secretary since September 2023. In May 2024, he succeeded Ma Xiaowei, who will reach retirement age in December. On 28 June 2024, he was appointed head of the National Health Commission, according to a decision adopted by the Standing Committee of the National People's Congress, China's top legislature.

=== Obesity in China ===
In 2025, Lei noted that chronic non-communicable diseases pose significant health risks. The National Health Commission aimed to promote a healthier lifestyle since over half of China's adult population is overweight or obese. Lei revealed that the Commission would support the establishment of weight clinics in hospitals and had developed a weight-loss manual for 2024 featuring regional recipes. The health ministry also urged hotels to install scales.

== Researches ==
Lei had published numerous academic papers on the socioeconomic impact of chronic diseases in China. In March 2023, he visited Hong Kong with a health delegation to study the city's primary medical care.

== Selected publications ==
- Lei, Haichao; Wang, Jing; Liu, Xinliang (2008). "Study on national hospitalization rate in China using second-hand data: A systematic review approach". Chinese Journal of Hospital Administration (in Chinese): 649–652.
- Lei, Haichao; Li, Liqiu; Liu, Xiuying; Mao, Ayan (2009). "Quantitative study on socioeconomic determinants of life expectancy in Beijing, China". Journal of Evidence-Based Medicine. 2 (2): 92–98. doi:10.1111/j.1756-5391.2009.01022.x. ISSN 1756-5391.
- Lei, Haichao (2008). "Considerations on fundamental issues in establishing a universal coverage system for health in China". Journal of Evidence-Based Medicine. 1 (1): 37–40. doi:10.1111/j.1756-5391.2008.00001.x. ISSN 1756-5391.

Government offices
New title	Director of the Beijing Municipal Health Commission; 2018–2020	Succeeded by Yu Luming
Preceded by Ma Xiaowei	Head of the National Health Commission; 2024–present	Incumbent
