= Yu Luming =

Chinese politician

- 于鲁明

Vice Chairman of the Beijing Municipal Committee of the Chinese People's Political Consultative Conference
- In office January 2018 – April 2022
- Chairman: Wei Xiaodong

Personal details
- Born: December 1961 (age 64) Beijing, China
- Party: Chinese Peasants' and Workers' Democratic Party (1986–present); Chinese Communist Party (1992–2022; expelled)
- Education: Peking University Health Science Center

Chinese name
- Simplified Chinese: 于鲁明
- Traditional Chinese: 于魯明
Transcriptions
Standard Mandarin
- Hanyu Pinyin: Yú Lǔmíng

Yu Luming (Chinese: 于鲁明; born December 1961) is a former Chinese politician. In April 2022, Yu was investigated by China's top anti-corruption agency, and in March 2023, Yu Luming was charged with bribery.

Previously he served as vice chairman of the Beijing Municipal Committee of the Chinese People's Political Consultative Conference. He is a member of the 13th National Committee of the Chinese People's Political Consultative Conference.

== Biography ==
A native of Beijing, Yu graduated from Beijing Medical College (now Peking University Health Science Center). He joined the Chinese Peasants' and Workers' Democratic Party in December 1986, and joined the Chinese Communist Party in June 1992. He worked in the Daxing District Government for a long time before being transferred to the Beijing Municipal People's Government. At the height of his political career, he was vice chairman of the Beijing Municipal Committee of the Chinese People's Political Consultative Conference, a position at vice-ministerial level.

=== Downfall ===
On April 16, 2022, Yu was placed under investigation for "serious violations of discipline and laws" by the Central Commission for Discipline Inspection (CCDI), the party's internal disciplinary body, and the National Supervisory Commission, the highest anti-corruption agency of China.

On July 18, 2022, Yu was expelled from the CCP and removed from public office. On July 29, he was detained by the Supreme People's Procuratorate. On October 30, he was indicted on suspicion of accepting bribes.

On March 30, 2023, Yu Luming pleaded guilty to accepting 10.5 million yuan ($1.5 million) in bribes. Yu was bribed to give health project contracts and illegally secure land between 2001 and 2019 for relevant organizations and individuals. Yu was tried in Zhangjiakou. On September 26, he was sentenced to 11 years in prison and fined one million yuan ($136,000) for the crime of accepting bribes by the Intermediate People's Court of Zhangjiakou.

Party political offices
Preceded by Yu Wenming	Chairman of the Beijing Municipal Committee of the Chinese Peasants' and Workers' Democratic Party; 2017–2022	Succeeded by Wang Jinnan
Government offices
New title	Director of Beijing Municipal Medical Security Bureau; 2018–2020	Succeeded by Ma Jiye (马继业)
Preceded by Lei Haichao	Director of Beijing Municipal Health Commission; 2020–2022	Succeeded by Liu Juncai
