= National Health Commission =

Chinese department responsible for health policies

National Health Commission of the People's Republic of China
- 中华人民共和国国家卫生健康委员会; Zhōnghuá Rénmín Gònghéguó Guójiā Wèishēng Jiànkāng Wěiyuánhuì
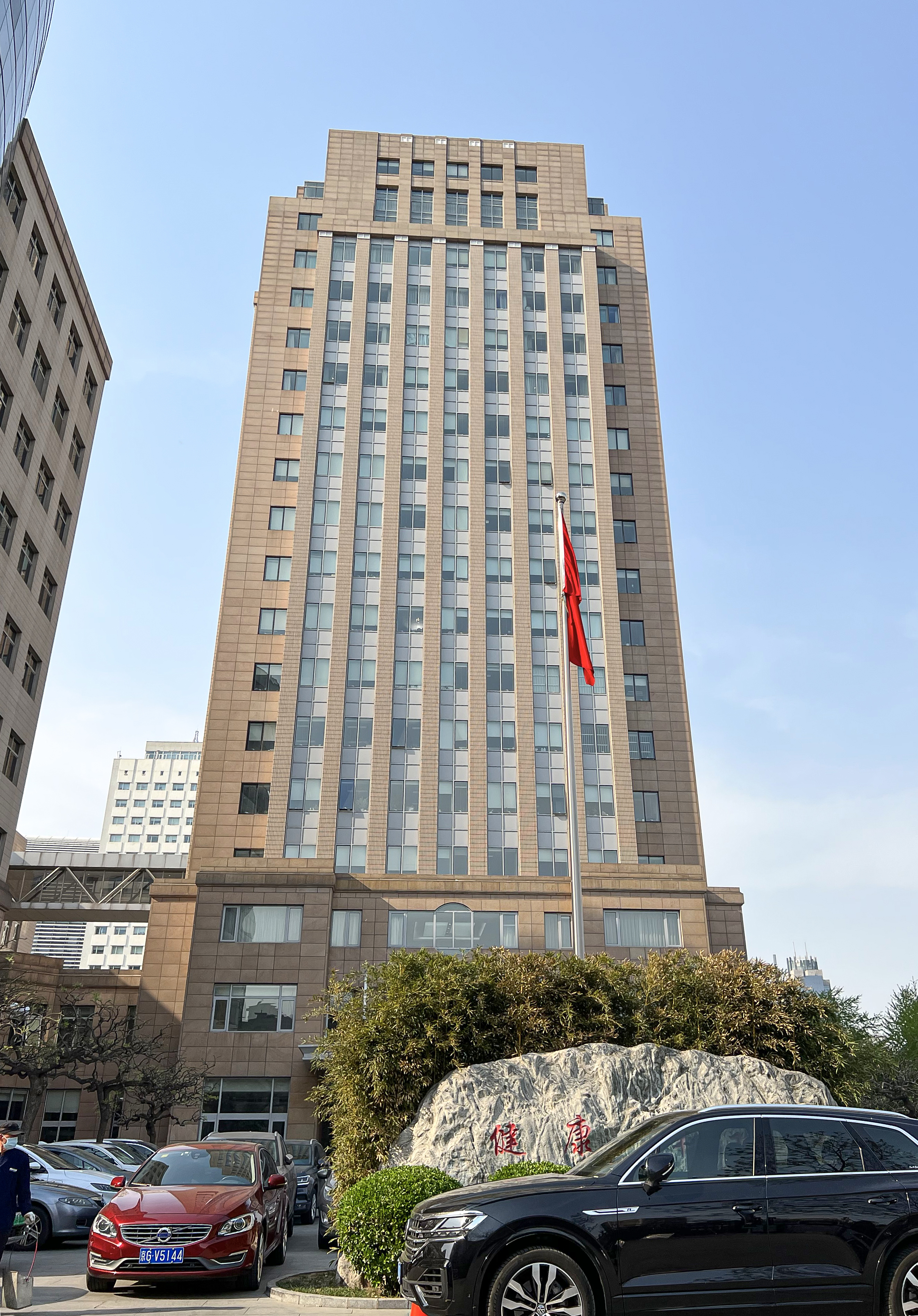
- Headquarters

Agency overview
- Formed: 19 March 2018; 8 years ago
- Preceding agency: National Health and Family Planning Commission
- Type: Constituent Department of the State Council (cabinet-level executive department)
- Jurisdiction: Government of China
- Headquarters: Beijing
- Minister responsible: Lei Haichao, Head
- Parent agency: State Council
- Website: en.nhc.gov.cn

The National Health Commission (NHC) is a cabinet-level executive department of the State Council of the People's Republic of China which is responsible for formulating national health policies. It was formed on 19 March 2018. The ministry is headquartered in Beijing. The commission is led by a Minister of cabinet rank in the state council. Lei Haichao is the current Minister in charge of the Commission and Party Branch Secretary. Its predecessor was the National Health and Family Planning Commission.

== History ==
Throughout most of PRC's rule since 1954, the national health portfolio has been the responsibility of the Ministry of Health; superseded in 2013 by the National Health and Family Planning Commission.

In March 2018, it was announced that National Health and Family Planning Commission was dissolved and that its functions were integrated into the new agency, the National Health Commission as part of the deepening the reform of the Party and state institutions.

China is a member of the World Health Organization. Minister Ma reported in the 92nd World Health Assembly, since 1978, China has been focused on improving primary healthcare, develop universal safety net for residents and improving the quality, efficiency and access to primary health care.

The National Health Commission supervises medical providers.

The commission has a role in providing foreign aid through its coordination of China's overseas medical teams.

In December 2020, the National Health Commission issued additional policies to combat fraud and corruption in healthcare. As part of its campaigns against fraud, inspections of 627,000 medical institutions were conducted, resulting in 26,100 people being sanctioned and the recovery of 22,310 million yuan.

=== 2020 coronavirus epidemic ===
The commission is the lead agency in mainland China coordinating the national efforts to combat the COVID-19 pandemic.

On 11 February 2020, in order to manage the ongoing health crisis, the following changes were announced by the NHC:

- Zhang Jin, chief of the Hubei health commission, was replaced by Wang Hesheng, the deputy director of China National Health Commission.
- Liu Yingzi, director of the Hubei health commission, was replaced by Wang Hesheng.

In December 2022, a week after the NHC said it would no longer release official death tolls from Covid, the NHC said that "China has always been publishing information on Covid-19 deaths and severe cases in the spirit of openness and transparency."

== Subordinate agencies ==
The following agencies directly report to the commission.

Sub-ministry-level executive agencies of the State Council administered by the NHC

- National Administration of Traditional Chinese Medicine
- National Administration of Disease Control and Prevention

Institutions directly under the NHC

- Chinese Center for Disease Control and Prevention
- Chinese Academy of Medical Sciences a.k.a. Peking Union Medical College

Hospitals directly under the NHC

- Beijing Hospital
- China-Japan Friendship Hospital
- Peking Union Medical College Hospital
