= Chinese Medical Doctor Association =

National medical association in China

The Chinese Medical Doctor Association (CMDA) is a non-profit organization founded in 2002. This organization is recognized by the Ministry of Civil Affairs of the People's Republic of China as a primary level national association. CDMA is organized under the Medical Practitioners Act 1999. It has been developed as the largest and most influential medical association in China for now since it started. Under this organization there are 26 local associations, 39 specialty sub-association, five special committees and 18 medical publications.

== See also ==
- Medicine in China
