= National Health and Family Planning Commission =

National Health and Family Planning Commission of the People's Republic of China
- 中华人民共和国国家卫生和计划生育委员会; Zhōnghuá Rénmín Gònghéguó; Guójiā Wèishēng hé Jìhuàshēngyù Wěiyuánhuì
- National emblem of China

Agency overview
- Formed: March 2013
- Preceding agencies: National Population and Family Planning Commission; Ministry of Health
- Dissolved: March 2018
- Superseding agency: National Health Commission
- Type: Constituent Department of the State Council (cabinet-level executive department)
- Jurisdiction: China
- Headquarters: Beijing
- Minister responsible: Li Bin, Head
- Parent agency: State Council
- Website: nhfpc.gov.cn (archived)

The National Health and Family Planning Commission of the People's Republic of China (NHFPC) was a cabinet-level executive department under the State Council which is responsible for providing information, raising health awareness and education, family planning, ensuring the accessibility of health services, monitoring the quality of health services provided to citizens and visitors in the mainland, population and family planning in the People's Republic of China. In March 2018, the ministry was dissolved and its functions were integrated into the new agency called the National Health Commission.

== History ==
The Ministry is created from the former Ministry of Health and National Population and Family Planning Commission. This was announced at the 2013 National People's Congress.

From 16 March 2013 to March 2018, the commission is headed by Li Bin.

In March 2018, the ministry was dissolved and its functions were integrated into the new agency called the National Health Commission as part of the deepening the reform of the Party and state institutions.

The enforcement agency, euphemistically known as Family Planning, has long been infamous for its brutality. If people couldn't pay the crippling fines for excess births—up to many times a family's annual income—officials would vandalize their homes, knocking down roofs and doors, and confiscate furniture, cattle, and pigs. They have also been rumored to steal babies, delivering them to orphanages and likely receiving kickbacks in return.

== Functions and responsibilities ==
The commission reports directly to the State Council. Its functions include:

- Drafting laws, regulations, plans and policies related to public health
- Formulating policies for maternity and child-care programs
- Overseeing disease prevention and treatment
- Controlling the spread of epidemics
- Supervising blood collection
- Reforming medical institutions
- Overseeing state hospitals
- Drawing up medical science and technology development projects
- Setting quality standards for foods and cosmetics
- Overseeing medical education and setting related standards
- Controlling the Beijing Medical College and the Chinese Academy of Medical Sciences; and
- Overseeing the State Administration of Traditional Chinese Medicine
- Population control
- Family planning

== List of ministers ==
Minister in charge of the National Health and Family Planning Commission
No.	Name	Took office	Office dissolved
1	Li Bin	16 March 2013	March 2018

== See also ==
- Family planning policy of Mainland China
  - One-child policy
