= Qian Xinzhong =

Chinese politician (1911–2009)

- 钱信忠
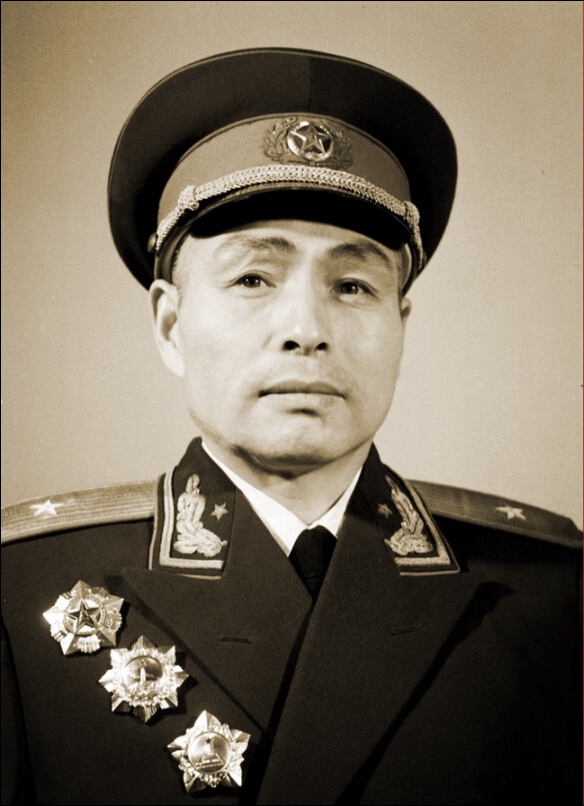

Chairman of the National Family Planning Commission
- In office May 1982 – December 1983
- Preceded by: Chen Muhua
- Succeeded by: Wang Wei

Minister of Health
- In office January 1965 – July 1973
- Preceded by: Li Dequan
- Succeeded by: Liu Xiangping
- In office April 1979 – May 1982
- Preceded by: Jiang Yizhen
- Succeeded by: Cui Yueli

Personal details
- Born: December 30, 1911 Baoshan County, Jiangxi, Qing China (present-day Baoshan District, Shanghai, China)
- Died: 31 December 2009 (aged 98) Beijing, China
- Party: Chinese Communist Party

Qian Xinzhong (Chinese: 钱信忠; 1911 – December 31, 2009) was the Minister of Health (1965–1973, 1979–1982) and chairman of the National Family Planning Commission (NFPC, May 1982 - December 1983) of the People's Republic of China. As chairman of the NFPC, he made and enforced the policy of "IUD after first birth, sterilization after second birth". According to official statistics, a record number of birth control surgeries were performed in China in 1983, including 17.8 million IUD placements, 16.4 million tubal ligations, 4.3 million vasectomies, and 14.4 million induced abortions.

== Biography ==
Born in Baoshan, Jiangsu Province (now in Shanghai), Qian entered Tongji University in 1926 to study German language and art. From 1928, he studied medicine in Baolong Hospital of Tongji University (Tongji Medical College affiliated in Huazhong University of Science and Technology, current). In December 1940, the health department of 129th army division and the field army health department of Eighth Route Army headquarters merged, and Qian became the head of new health department. In 1945, he was appointed as head of health department of Shanxi-Hebei-Shandong-Henan military region.

After formation of PR China, Qian was sent to Soviet Union in 1951 and studied at USSR First Medical College. In 1955, he attained the rank of major general of the People's Liberation Army of China. After returning to China in 1956, he was appointed as vice director of health department of PLA General Logistics Department, and the president of PLA Academy of Military Medical Sciences. In 1957, he became the deputy Minister of Health.

Before the Cultural Revolution, the Ministry of Health focused on the delivery of health care in urban hospitals, a model which Qian promoted. Mao Zedong criticized Qian for this, arguing that an urban hospital-focused health care model failed to treat peasants and focused on cure rather than preventative medicine. During the Cultural Revolution, Qian was purged and tortured.

He re-emerged in 1973, and directed malaria prevention campaign in five provinces of China. He was re-appointed as Minister of Health in 1979.

He was given the United Nations Population Award in 1983, along with Indira Gandhi.

== See also ==
- Compulsory sterilization
- Forced abortion
