= National Committee for the Protection of Children of China =

National organization in China, 1951–1983

- 中国人民保卫儿童全国委员会
- Formation: November 26, 1951
- Founder: Soong Ching-ling (chairwoman)
- Type: Mass organization
- Headquarters: Beijing, People's Republic of China
- Chairwoman: Soong Ching-ling (1951–1981); Kang Keqing (1983– )
- Parent organization: All-China Women's Federation (after 1960)

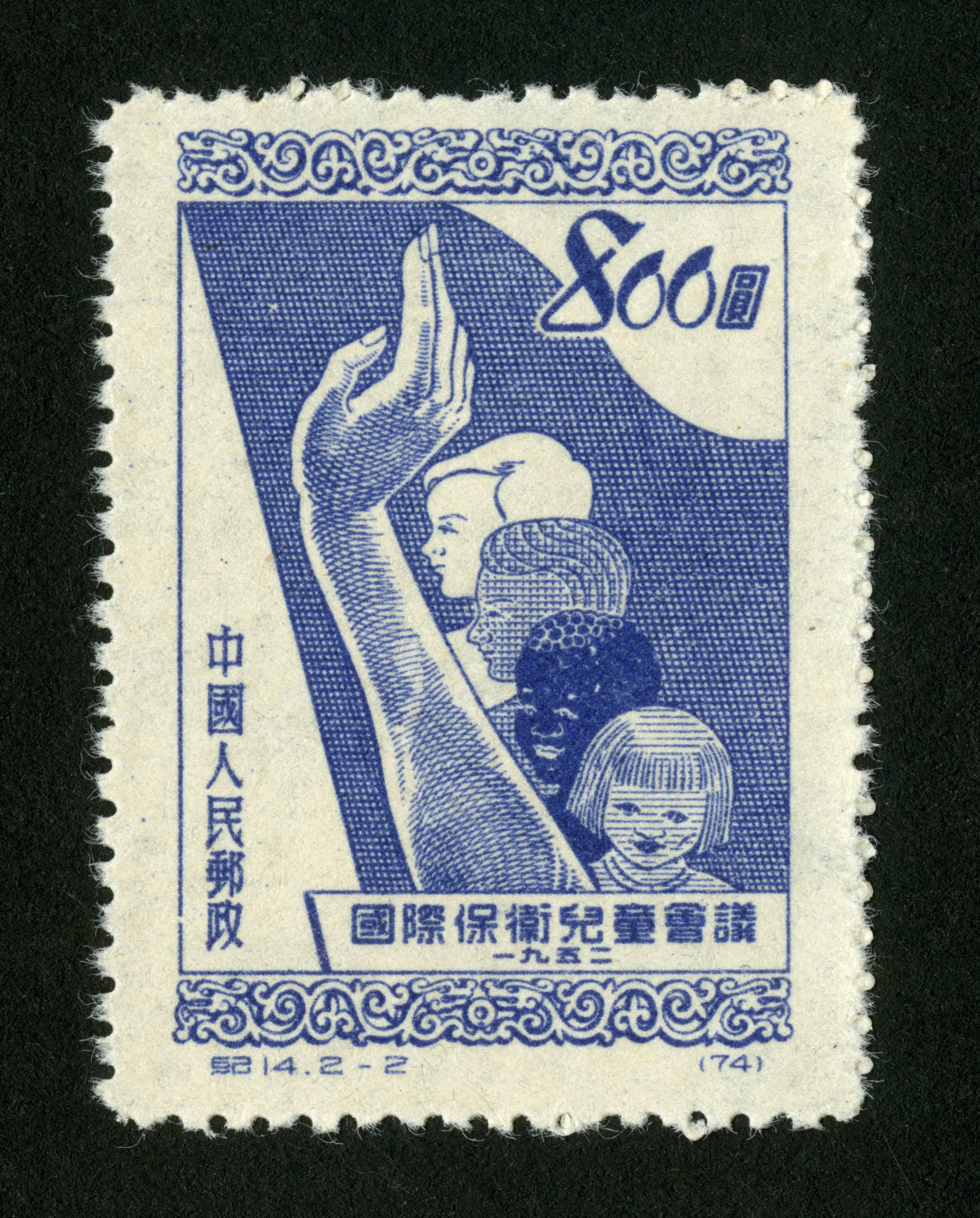
Commemorative stamp of the International Conference for the Protection of Children in 1952

The National Committee for the Protection of Children of China (Chinese: 中国人民保卫儿童全国委员会) was a national organization in the early years of the People's Republic of China, serving as a leading body for child-related work. It was founded on 26 November 1951 in Beijing. Soong Ching-ling chosen as the founding chair at the first meeting, while Deng Yingchao and Li Dequan were chosen as vice chairs. The committee had members from women's groups, youth groups, trade unions. It had people who worked in art, education, literature, and medicine.
