= Chinese Medical Journal =

- Discipline: Medicine
- Language: English
- Edited by: Chen Wang

Publication details
- History: 1887-present
- Publisher: Chinese Medical Association/Wolters Kluwer Medknow
- Frequency: Biweekly
- Open access: Yes
- Impact factor: 7.3 (2024)

Standard abbreviations
- ISO 4: Chin. Med. J.
- NLM: Chin Med J (Engl)

Indexing
- CODEN: CMDJAS
- ISSN: 0366-6999
- LCCN: 56022925
- OCLC no.: 476629088

Links
- Journal homepage; Online access; Online archive

The Chinese Medical Journal is an official publication of the Chinese Medical Association, co-published by Chinese Medical Association Publishing House and Wolters Kluwer Medknow. The journal publishes peer-reviewed English-language articles, covering technical and clinical studies related to health, as well as ethical and social issues in medical research.

== History ==
The China Medical Missionary Association was established in Shanghai in 1887. It started publishing The China Medical Missionary Journal the following year. The association was renamed later as the Chinese Medical Association and in 1932 merged into the National Medical Association of China. The China Medical Missionary Journal then merged into the English part of the National Medical Journal of China to become the Chinese Medical Journal.

== Abstracting and indexing ==
The journal is abstracted and indexed in:

- Biological Abstracts
- Chemical Abstracts
- Index Medicus/MEDLINE
- Science Citation Index Expanded
- Current Contents
- EMBASE

According to the Journal Citation Reports, the journal has a 2024 impact factor of 7.3.
