= Wang Jinnan =

- 王金南

Chairman of the Beijing Municipal Committee of the Chinese Peasants' and Workers' Democratic Party
- Incumbent
- Assumed office July 2022
- Preceded by: Yu Luming

Personal details
- Born: 14 July 1962 (age 64) Jinhua County, Zhejiang, China
- Party: Chinese Peasants' and Workers' Democratic Party
- Education: Tsinghua University
- Scientific career
- Fields: Engineering management
- Workplaces: Environmental Planning Institute of the Ministry of Ecology and Environment

Wang Jinnan (Chinese: 王金南; pinyin: Wáng Jīnnán; born 14 July 1962) is a Chinese engineer who is president of Environmental Planning Institute of the Ministry of Ecology and Environment and director of State Environmental Protection Key Laboratory of Environmental Planning and Policy Simulation, and an academician of the Chinese Academy of Engineering.

== Biography ==
Wang was born in the village of Shanghuang in Jinhua County, Zhejiang, on 14 July 1962. He has five siblings. His younger brother Wang Yonghua (王永华) is the leader of his home-village. He secondary studied at Baoshan High School (宝山中学) and Wuyi No. 2 High School (武义二中). He earned a bachelor's degree in 1986, a master's degree in 1988, and a doctor's degree in 2002, all from Tsinghua University.

In May 1994, he became deputy director of the Institute of Environmental Management, China Research Academy of Environmental Sciences, rising to party secretary in July 1997. In February 2002, he joined the Environmental Planning Institute of State Environmental Protection Administration (now Ministry of Ecology and Environment), becoming chief engineer in June 2003 and dean and vice-president in August 2017. In December 2006, he was recruited by Nanjing University as a professor and doctoral supervisor at the School of the Environment. He was appointed director of State Environmental Protection Key Laboratory of Environmental Planning and Policy Simulation in February 2010. In December 2017, he was elected a member of the 16th Central Committee of the Chinese Peasants and Workers Democratic Party. In March 2018, he became a delegate to the 13th National People's Congress. In July 2019, he was engaged by Zhejiang University as a chair professor. In July 2022, he was appointed as chairman of the Beijing Municipal Committee of the Chinese Peasants' and Workers' Democratic Party, succeeding Yu Luming.

== Personal life ==
Wang married Liu Yaming (刘亚明), who was his classmate at Wuyi No. 2 High School. She graduated from the Department of Foreign Languages, Hangzhou University (now Zhejiang University) and was deputy dean of the School of Foreign Languages, Beijing University of Science and Technology, currently serving as president of Confucius Institute of De Montfort University.

== Honours and awards ==
- 2012 Environmental Protection Science and Technology Award (Second Class)
- 2014 Environmental Protection Science and Technology Award (First Class)
- 2015 Environmental Protection Science and Technology Award (First Class)
- 2016 State Science and Technology Progress Award (Second Class)
- 27 November 2017 Member of the Chinese Academy of Engineering (CAE)

Party political offices
Preceded by Yu Luming	Chairman of the Beijing Municipal Committee of the Chinese Peasants' and Workers' Democratic Party; 2022–present	Incumbent
