= Zhang Wenkang =

Chinese politician

- Traditional Chinese: 張文康
- Simplified Chinese: 张文康
Transcriptions
Standard Mandarin
- Hanyu Pinyin: Zhāng Wénkāng

Zhang Wenkang (born 1940 in Nanhui, Shanghai) was the health minister of China during the SARS outbreak who was sacked for mishandling the matter.

Zhang was a supporter of Jiang Zemin, former General Secretary of the Chinese Communist Party. Zhang was Jiang's personal physician. After he was fired, he was placed in various ceremonial positions.

Government offices
Preceded by Chen Minzhang	Minister of Health; 1998–2003	Succeeded by Wu Yi
