= Li Dequan =

Chinese politician

- 李德全
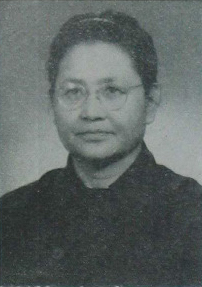

Minister of Health
- In office 19 October 1949 – 4 January 1964
- Preceded by: Position established
- Succeeded by: Qian Xinzhong

Personal details
- Born: August 9, 1896 Tongzhou, Shuntian Prefecture, Zhili, China (now Tongzhou District, Beijing, China)
- Died: 23 April 1972 (aged 75) Beijing, China
- Party: Chinese Communist Party
- Spouse: Feng Yuxiang (m. 1924; died 1948)
- Children: 4

Li Dequan (Li Teh-Chuan Chinese: 李德全; 1896–1972) was the first Minister of Health of the People's Republic of China from 1949 to 1965.

== History ==
Li was born in Tong County, Beijing. In her early years, she would take part in pro-democracy campaigns. Dequan later graduated from the Methodist Women's College and worked as a pastor's assistant at a Congregational church. She was married to the warlord General Feng Yuxiang in 1924. She was a close friend of Han Shuxiu, the wife of General Guo Songling, a subordinate of the warlord Marshal Zhang Zuolin, the "Old Marshal" who ruled Manchuria. Both Han and Li had attended the same Methodist Women's College. Li had "stirred up" Han who in turn demanded that her husband rebel against Zhang with the aim of taking Manchuria for himself. In 1925, Guo rebelled, but the rebellion ended in failure. Both Guo and Han were publicly executed after the failure of the rebellion. The British journalist Bertram Lenox Simpson wrote the rebellion was why Chinese women should not get a Western education as he wrote "in the end the foreign educated wives got their way with the tragic reasons known".

During the Second Sino-Japanese War, she organized the Zhong guo zhan shi er tong bao yu hui (中国战时儿童保育会 1938–1946) and served as vice president. After the war, she founded All-China Women's Federation and became its chairman. In January 1948, she was elected central executive member of Revolutionary Committee of the Kuomintang. She joined the Chinese Communist Party in December 1958. She was elected to serve on the Executive Council of the Women's International Democratic Federation in 1948, and re-elected in 1953.

After the formation of the People's Republic of China, Li was appointed the first Minister of Health of the PRC central government and she supported legalization of abortion. She also served as chairman of the Red Cross Society of China. Her other posts included vice chairman of the China-USSR Friendship Association, member of the Commission of Culture and Education of the State Council, vice chairman of the China National Sports Commission, and vice chairman of the China People's National Commission of Children Protection.

Li also served as a standing committee member of 1st to 3rd Chinese People's Political Consultative Conference (CPPCC), and vice chairman of 4th CPPCC.

She died in Beijing in 1972.

== Books ==
- Merkel-Hess, Kate (2024). Women and Their Warlords Domesticating Militarism in Modern China. Chicago: University of Chicago Press. ISBN 9780226834313.
