= Shi Guangsheng =

Chinese politician (born 1939)

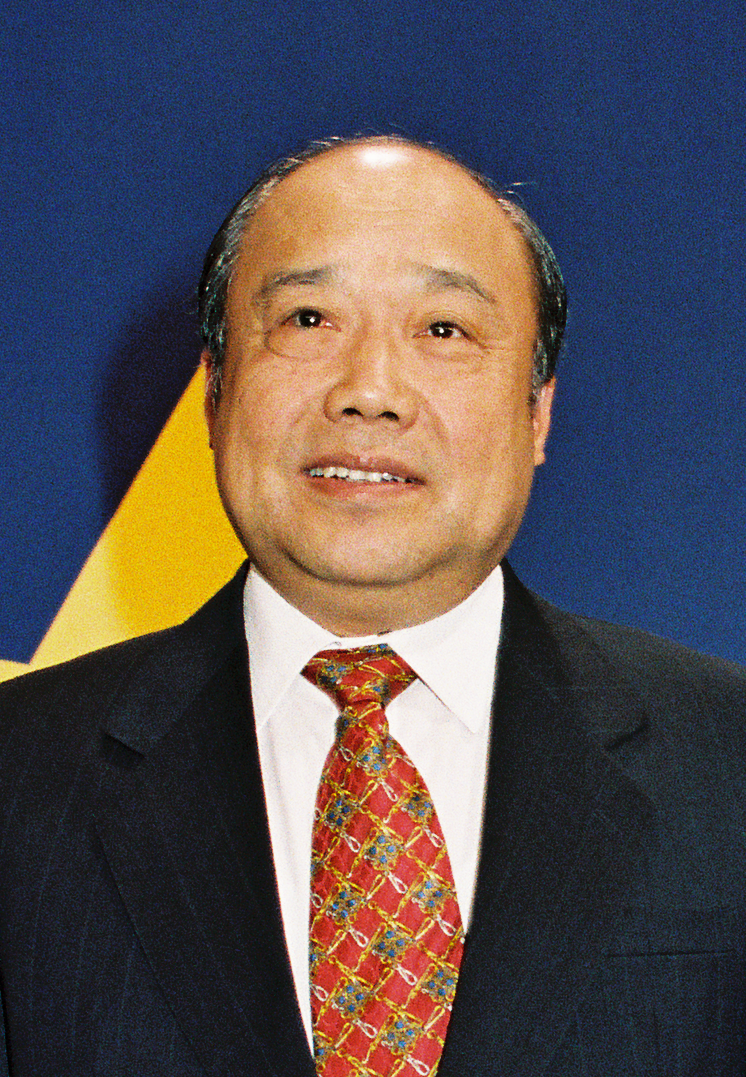
Shi Guangsheng in 1998

Shi Guangsheng (Chinese: 石廣生; born September 1939) is a politician of the People's Republic of China, and the former Minister of Foreign Trade and Economic Co-operation of China.
