= Head of the National Health Commission =

Chinese government position

Head of National Health Commission of the People's Republic of China
- 中华人民共和国国家卫生健康委员会主任
- National Emblem of China

- Flag of China

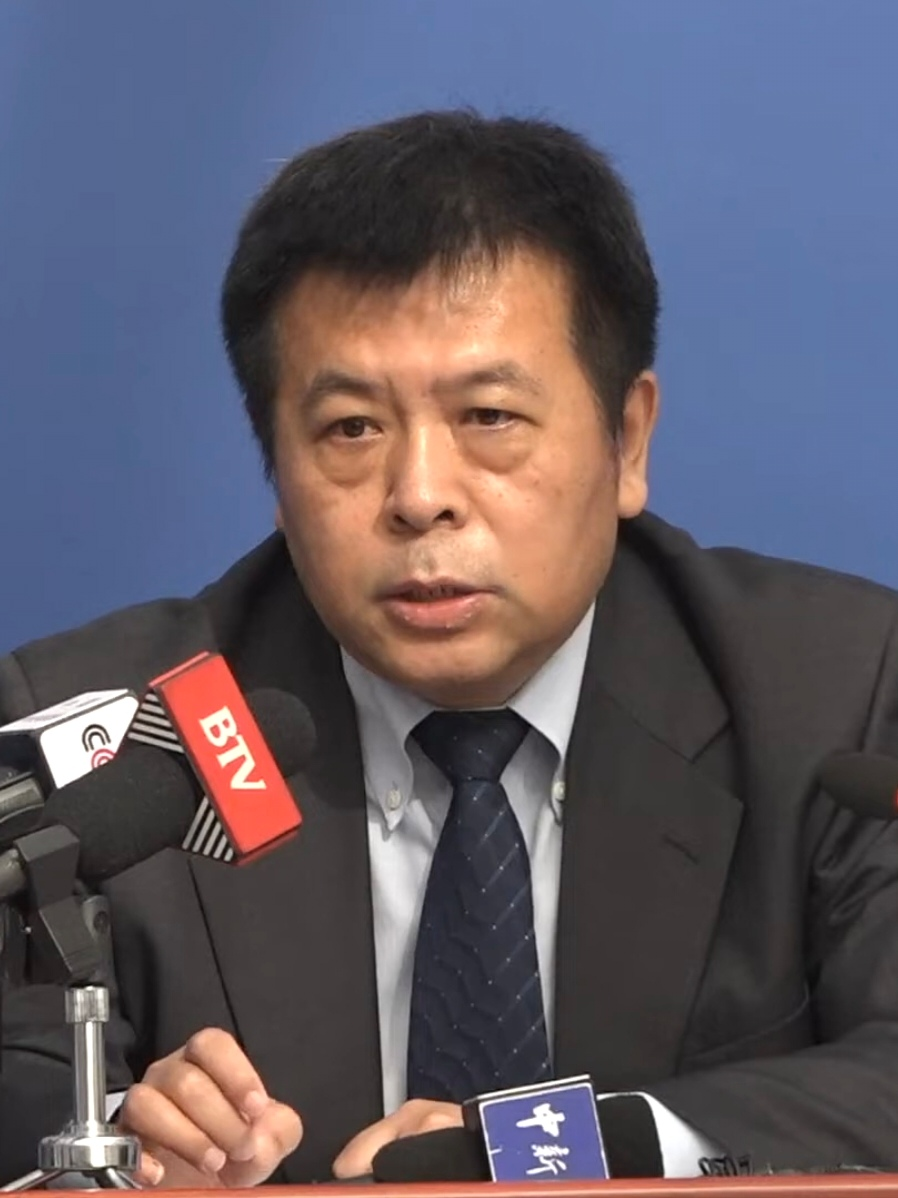
- Incumbent; Lei Haichao since 28 June 2024
- National Health Commission
- Status: Provincial and ministerial-level official
- Member of: Plenary Meeting of the State Council
- Seat: National Health Commission Building, Xicheng District, Beijing
- Nominator: Premier (chosen within the Chinese Communist Party)
- Appointer: President with the confirmation of the National People's Congress or its Standing Committee
- Formation: 19 November 1949; 76 years ago
- First holder: Li Dequan
- Deputy: Deputy Head

The head of the National Health Commission of the People's Republic of China is the head of the National Health Commission of the People's Republic of China and a member of the State Council. Within the State Council, the position is twenty-second in order of precedence. The head is responsible for leading the commission, presiding over its meetings, and signing important documents related to the commission. Officially, the head is nominated by the premier of the State Council, who is then approved by the National People's Congress or its Standing Committee and appointed by the president. The current head is Lei Haichao, who concurrently serves as the Chinese Communist Party Committee Secretary of the commission.

== List of heads ==
=== Minister of National Health ===
No.	Name	Took office	Left office	Ref.
1	Li Dequan	October 1949	January 1965	
2	Qian Xinzhong	January 1965	June 1968	
3	Qiu Guoguang	June 1968	June 1970	
4	Chen Renhong	June 1970	July 1973	
5	Liu Xiangping	July 1973	October 1976	
Vacant
6	Jiang Yizhen	November 1977	April 1979	
(2)	Qian Xinzhong	April 1979	May 1982	
7	Cui Yueli	May 1982	March 1987	
8	Chen Minzhang	March 1987	March 1998	
9	Zhang Wenkang	March 1998	April 2003	
10	Wu Yi	April 2003	April 2005	
11	Gao Qiang	April 2005	June 2007	
12	Chen Zhu	June 2007	16 March 2013	

=== Head of the National Health and Family Planning Commission ===
No.	Name	Took office	Left office	Ref.
1	Li Bin	16 March 2013	March 2018	

=== Head of the National Health Commission ===
No.	Name	Took office	Left office	Ref.
1	Ma Xiaowei	19 March 2018	6 May 2024	
2	Lei Haichao	28 June 2024	incumbent	
