= Medicine in China =

In China, the practice of medicine is a mixture of government, charitable, and private institutions, while many people rely on traditional medicine. Until reforms in the late twentieth and early twenty-first century, physicians were quasi-government employees and with little freedom in the choice of the hospital to work with. In addition, decades of planned economic policy discouraged physicians from opening their own clinics, and the practice of medicine was generally under the control of local units, such as factories, government, offices, or communes. The reforms created a largely private practice, and physicians now are encouraged to open private clinics and for-profit hospitals.

== Chinese Medical Association ==
The Chinese Medical Association is the largest and oldest non-governmental medical organization in China. It was established by a group of medical professionals in 1915 with an aim to uniting medical professionals, upholding medical ethics and advocating social integrity. It currently counts over 430,000 members and 82 specialty societies. It publishes over 70 medical journals WA (including the Chinese Medical Journal), as well as a medical bulletin and a medical education magazine. The CMA plays a leading and active role in the nation's medical education, training and professional exchanges.

== Chinese Academy of Medical Sciences ==
From 1957, Peking Union Medical College is merged into the Chinese Academy of Medical Sciences as one single institution directly under the Ministry of Health, now the National Health Commission.

== Physicians ==
=== Physician compensation ===
At government-controlled hospitals, physicians are salaried employees. Salaries are based on working experience and professional level. Some hospitals also pay a bonus to physicians according to the hospital's operating performance and the physician's contributions. Physicians' salaries vary greatly. For those working at busy and well-known hospitals, their base salaries can be a few times as much as those of physicians working at low-ranking hospitals. Chinese hospitals are classified into three general levels, with level 3 at the top and level 1 at the bottom. Each level has sub-levels of A, B, and C. Some elite hospitals are even rated 3A+.

For many physicians, in particular those at big hospitals, specialty hospitals, or hospitals with large reputations, physician incomes can be larger than regular hospitals. Physicians, and in particular, surgeons, can augment their hospital salaries by conducting surgeries at hospitals other than the ones in which they are employed. Many physicians also receive commissions from prescribing prescription drugs and get "red envelopes" from patients (patients give money or gifts to their physicians for receiving treatment) or from sales representatives of drug companies. New regulations issued by the Health Ministry, however, remove physicians from the practice of medicine if they are found to have taken "red envelopes" from patients, and a hotline has been set up to monitor physicians.

=== Social status ===
In China, physicians are well respected, but as a group they are not at the top of the social structure of the country because their incomes fall in the middle class.

According to a Ph.D. candidate at a U.S. Public Health School, who was a physician at a well-known 3A hospital in Beijing, like other junior physicians, she seldom received "red envelopes" from patients, and only senior physicians or physicians with fame would have such opportunities. The student said those senior physicians had become members of the high-income class. Like the student, many physicians, went abroad to study because they were not satisfied with their status.

According to a 2002 statistics from Beijing Physicians Association, between 2000 and 2001, in Beijing about 2300 physicians resigned, and most of them went to work as sales representatives of drug companies. Some still practice medicine but work with privately owned hospitals rather than public hospitals.

=== Competitive pressure for hospitals ===
Influenced by a centrally planned economy, many hospitals were managed as government agencies rather than medical service organizations. Hospitals did not have competition pressures. The management team usually did not recognize the importance of developing and retaining high skilled physicians. Administrative personnel were more powerful than physicians at a hospital.

However, with the reform of the medical sector, Chinese hospitals are facing increasing competition from privately owned and foreign-investment-backed hospitals. Physicians are expected to enjoy higher legal income and better social status.

=== Physician training ===
To become a medical doctor, a person needs to study for 5 years at a medical school. For foreign or international students, the person needs to study for 6 years at the medical school, namely because the Chinese version is accelerated. Also, international students have to prepare for and take the Hanyu Shuiping Kaoshi for admission, and during med school, the Medical Chinese Exam. After graduation, the newly minted physician needs to complete 2–3 years of residency training, including training for subspecialty.

Upon graduation, the graduate must work as a resident physician for few years to be eligible to take a National Medical Licensing Examination (NMLE) for physician certification. This examination is conducted by the National Medical Examination Center (NMEC). Without approval of registration by the Ministry of Health one can not practice medicine in China as a physician or assistant physician.

American type of residency training has not been implemented nationwide in Chinese hospitals though almost all hospitals require their physicians to be trained as resident for few years before promotion to attending. American type of residency program was launched in some University affiliated hospitals. These students will complete their MD study and have to pass the national certification test during the residency.

There are general hospitals and specialty hospitals. A medical graduate rotates through several departments and then assigned to a specialty department according to his or her strengths and the hospital's needs. Specialty physician usually are attendings who specialized in certain specialty during the training process in a specialty hospital or in a subspecialty at a general hospital. Some medical experts have called for a standardized training and testing system for specialty physicians in accordance to American system. The classification of specialties at a Chinese hospital is similar to that at a U.S. hospital.

=== Prescription drugs ===
According to BCG's prediction in 2002, China's prescription drug market is expected to reach $24 billion and become the fifth largest market following Japan. AstraZeneca now ranks as the No. 1 foreign brand in terms of prescription sales in the Chinese market.

Physicians control the distribution of prescription drugs. Some hospitals and clinics stipulate patients must buy prescription drugs from the hospitals or directly from the physicians who make the prescriptions. Such a restriction aims to prevent the loss of sales on prescription drugs to retailers, but retailing drug stores are unhappy with such a restriction, and some of them have tried all means to lure away prescription drugs buyer from hospitals. For instance, they offer to pay drug buyers half a dollar for each prescription the buyers brought to the drug stores. Normally a prescription is effective on the day it is issued, but it can be effective within three days of prescription under certain conditions.

== Hospitals ==
Physicians used to be hired as full-time employees at a government controlled hospital. But with the reforming of the medical service sector, both physicians and hospitals have more freedom in choosing each other.

Young physicians usually have an employment contract with the hospital they work with, and a person can quit at will. The hospital can also lay off the individual if it is not satisfied with the employees performance or morality.

It is not uncommon for physicians to quit and take a different job. The top three reasons that lead many physicians in Beijing to quit include: doctors are not well paid; hospitals are poorly managed; and there are not enough personal development opportunities.

=== Management ===
For a government-controlled hospital, the hospital is still operated and managed by a management team under the leadership of the president of the hospital, who is usually nominated and appointed by the healthcare department of a province, a city or a county. But for a private hospital or a publicly traded hospital, the ownership is the same as that of a private company or a public company.

There are two types of hospitals in China – for-profit and non-profit. Profit-oriented hospitals may distribute their profit. Non-profit hospitals are government-owned, and will turn earnings into additional infrastructure or hand them back to the respective government authorities. Non-profit hospitals also enjoy preferential tax treatment and several government subsidies. They also get low-cost financing from the government for their capital investment.

=== Number ===
By the end of 2002, China has 306,000 healthcare and medical organizations, 63,858 of which are hospitals and clinics, 219,907 of which are nursing homes and 22,270 fall into other categories. Among them, only 1% are for profit, although all non-profit hospitals and clinics also rely on profits of selling drugs and treatments. Drug sales from hospitals account for 85% of total drug sales, with the remaining 15% going to drug stores.

Stripping out the government's subsidies, all government-subsidized hospitals would have been in the red. This poor operating performance can be partially due to that non-profit hospitals have little incentive to control costs, given the government's subsidies.

=== Private hospitals ===
In 2000, a reform started to occur in the Chinese hospital system. Government owned hospitals are being restructured, some of them being sold to individual investors, and more and more private hospitals are founded.

In 2004, Beijing Aikang Medical Investment Company bought a state-run-enterprise owned AAA hospital (the highest standard), and the acquisition was the first of this kind in China. The investment company plans to buy 10 hospitals in the next three to five years. In Fuzhou, the capital city of Fujian province, four government-owned hospitals have been sold to private investors.

=== Nursing and support staff ===
Nurses are normally well trained before being eligible for working with a hospital, but support workers are a problem. Some hospitals hire skill-less "underground" labors and after giving them some simple training use them as hospital support workers. These workers, mostly originating from rural areas, are poorly paid by those hospitals.

To secure the quality of hospital services, Beijing recently has passed a regulation on training and hiring qualified hospital support workers. In Tianjin, China's third largest city, about 1,000 unemployed people have been trained by local authority and passed hospital support work test. These people returned to work as certified support staff of a number of big hospitals.

==== Education ====
One needs to study at a nursing school for around three years before being eligible to work as a nurse. Most nursing schools enroll middle school graduates (Grade 9) and senior high school graduates (Grade 12), and they run four-year and three-year programs respectively.

A bachelor's degree in nursing has been available since late 1980s and early 1990s in China. Many medical schools including the School of Medicine of Beijing University offer five-year programs in nursing.

=== Locations ===
Most hospitals are located at downtown areas due to people's reliance on public transportation in China. More than 80% of Chinese medical resources are concentrated in urban areas, and the rest in rural areas.

== Payers ==
=== Payment for healthcare ===
The government, employers, and individuals pay for healthcare. In December 1998, a national medical insurance scheme was launched by the State Council. By end of 2002, most of the county or above level cities had joined the scheme and covered a population of about 100 million. Social Insurance Fund Administration Centre, a department of the Ministry of Labor and Social Security, oversees this insurance system. Currently, this system only focuses on employees of enterprises at or above township level. Those in remote or less developed areas cannot enjoy the benefits of this scheme, which is considered a shortcoming of the social medical insurance scheme.

The National Basic Medical Insurance Scheme ensures basic medical access by the public under the social security system. Individuals pay an annual insurance premium for their basic medical treatment entitlements. This scheme has replaced the previous government-funded labor insurance medical system.

Foreign-invested enterprises are required to provide health insurance benefits, but are not required to participate in the basic plan. For example, for employees of foreign enterprises in Beijing hired through Foreign Enterprises Service Corp. (FESCO), foreign enterprises pay FESCO, and FESCO then buys insurance policies for these employees. The government also allows commercial health insurers to operate in China.

In 2004, 119.41 million people had basic medical insurance. Revenues of basic medical insurance funds reached $91 billion, and payments were $74 billion.

=== Structure and implementation ===
==== Drug price regulation ====
The qualified drug catalogue under the basic medical scheme, which aims to control expenses on drugs, specifies drugs that are covered by the scheme and eligible for reimbursement. As the government-driven drug price regulation mechanism and the centralized tendering drug procurement program are only applicable to the drugs covered by the scheme, the scheme undoubtedly plays a crucial role in the development of the drug industry.

The basic insurance plan does not reimburse expenses for drugs not on the basic medical insurance drug list, the State Scheme Drug List for Basic Medical Insurance, which is based on clinical need, safety and efficacy, reasonable pricing, ease of use, and the desire to maintain a balance between Western and TCM products.

The basic medical insurance and at-work injury insurance of 2004 cover 832 traditional Chinese medicines, up from 415 of 2000; the number of chemical medicines covered by the insurance systems increase from 725 to 1031 from year 2000 to 2004, some of which are patent-protected drugs of Western companies.

Sino-Generali Life Insurance, a joint venture between China and Italy companies, offers a commercial medical insurance that reimburses 80% of prescription drugs, with an annual maximum reimbursement of $1000 per policy.

=== Changes ===
Before the reform of healthcare system, roughly 140 million workers and 60 million family members were covered under the State-owned enterprise (SOE) and collective insurance. This system has reimbursed 100 percent of employees' medical costs, and 50 percent of family members' costs. The system has been funded, in name at least, by the enterprises.

Hoping to reduce enterprise subsidies of all types, the State Council launched pilot reforms in 1994 of the two health insurance systems under its control. Begun in two midsize cities, Jiujiang, Jiangxi Province, and Zhenjiang, Jiangsu Province, and expanded to over 60 cities in 1997, this experiment has become national policy, applicable to domestic and foreign-invested firms. The two State health insurance systems would later be consolidated to be the Basic Medical Insurance System.

Only about 120 million to 180 million workers have some form of healthcare coverage that will pay for Western pharmaceuticals, according to industry analysts. Farmers, who make up the vast majority of Chinese, have no real coverage at all.

=== Government ===
The Chinese government used to cover up to 100% of medical fees for employees working with government agencies, state-owned enterprises, or educational organizations, but peasants didn't enjoy the policy.

Starting from 2001, a new medical coverage plan took effect, marking the government's withdrawal from shouldering whole medical insurance burden. Under the policy, urban residents must join a government managed basic insurance coverage plan for urban residents and pay a certain amount of monthly fees based on their income levels, and up to 70% of their medical expenses can be reimbursed. So far around 100 million urban residents are covered by the plan.

=== Private payers and insurance companies ===
According to a news report, 44.8% of urban residents and 79.1% of rural residents have no medical insurance. Many of people are private payers. They either cannot afford to buy medical insurance, or do not understand the value of medical insurance.

In contrast to rural residents, urban residents have much better situation. Many employers have bought for their employees group or supplementary medical insurance, and employers deduct from employees' payrolls a small percentage of their monthly incomes.

== Medical education ==
By 1901, China was the most popular destination for medical missionaries. The 150 foreign physicians operated 128 hospitals and 245 dispensaries, treating 1.7 million patients. In 1894, male medical missionaries comprised 14 percent of all missionaries; women doctors were four percent. Modern medical education in China started in the early 20th century at hospitals run by international missionaries.

Today Universities, colleges and institutes, which make up China's higher educational system, offer four- or five-year undergraduate programs as well as special two- or three-year programs. To control the medical education standard the Chinese ministry of education set up a quality control regulation on medical education, this regulation specially for English medium undergraduate medical education.

== See also ==
- Chinese Medical Doctor Association
- Chinese Medical Journal
- Christianity in China
- Classification of Chinese Hospitals
- Healthcare reform in the People's Republic of China
- Medical missions in China
- Pharmaceutical industry in China
- Smoking in the People's Republic of China
- National Administration of Traditional Chinese Medicine
