= Ruijin Hospital Affiliated with the Shanghai Jiao Tong University School of Medicine =

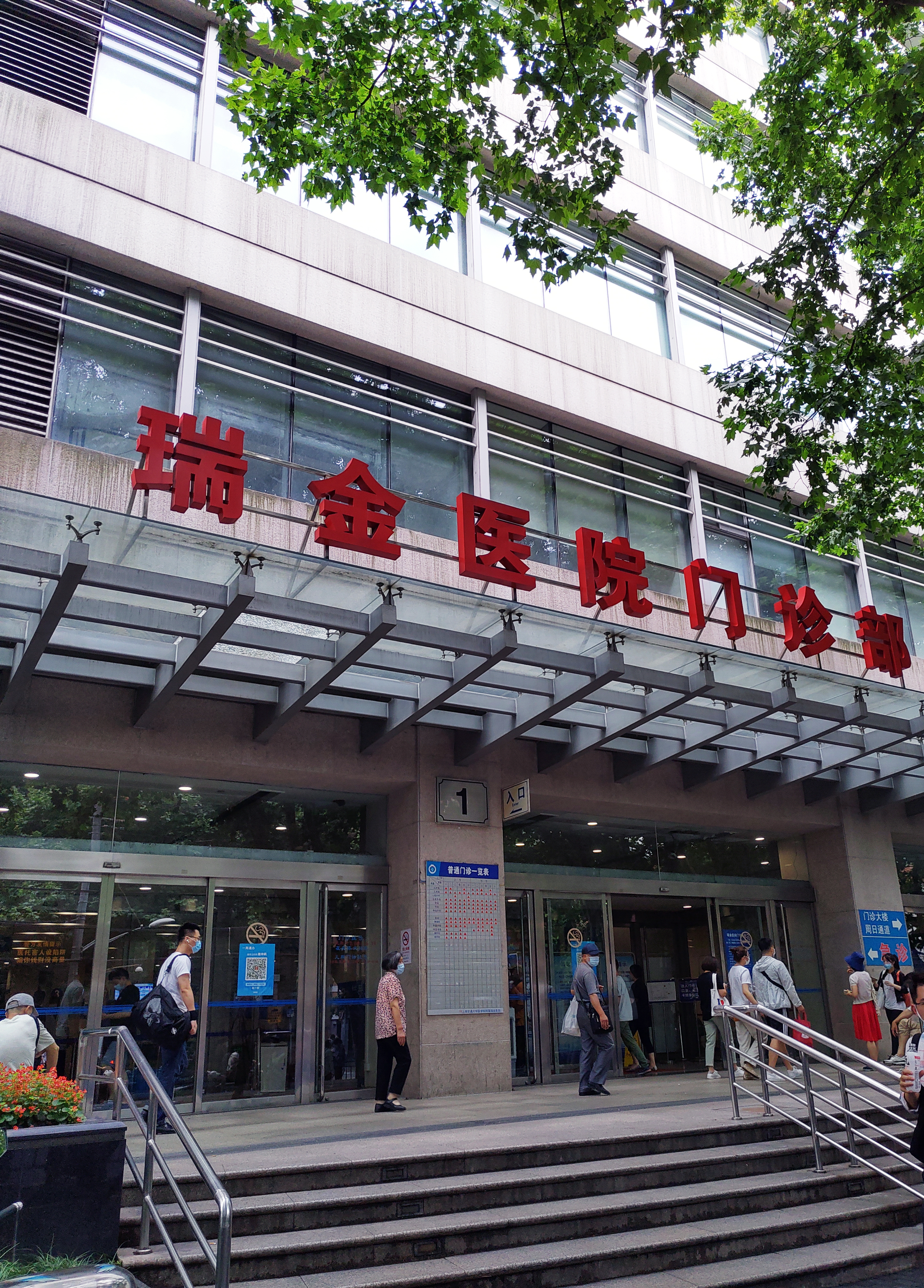
- Out-patient Department

Geography
- Location: 197 Ruijin 2nd Road, Huangpu, Shanghai, China
- Coordinates: 31.2109°N 121.4666°E

Organisation
- Care system: Public
- Type: Teaching
- Affiliated university: Shanghai Jiao Tong University School of Medicine

Services
- Standards: Grade 3, Class A
- Emergency department: Yes

History
- Founded: 1907; 119 years ago

Links
- Website: www.rjh.com.cn
- Lists: Hospitals in China

Ruijin Hospital Affiliated with the Shanghai Jiao Tong University School of Medicine (Chinese: 上海交通大学医学院附属瑞金医院) is a public hospital in Shanghai, China. It is affiliated with the Shanghai Jiao Tong University School of Medicine.

The hospital was founded in 1907 by the Kiangnan Mission of Catholic Church, it was formerly known as Sainte-Marie Hospital, Kuangtse Hospital, and Guangci Hospital (广慈医院; Guǎngcí Yīyuàn). As of 2022, it has over 6,000 employees and is ranked 3A.

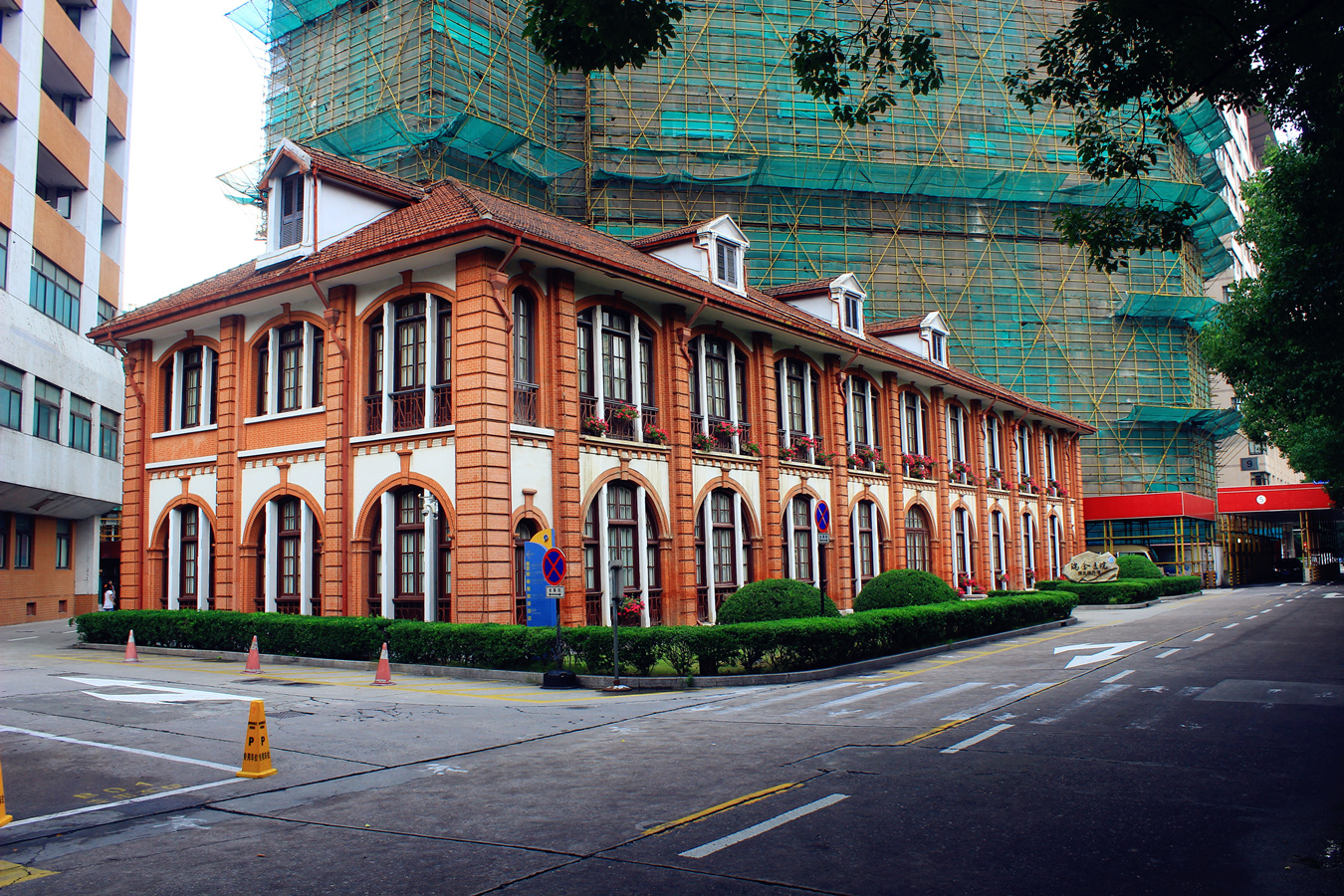
Historical building of Ruijin Hospital
