= Peking Union Medical College Hospital =

Hospital in Beijing, China

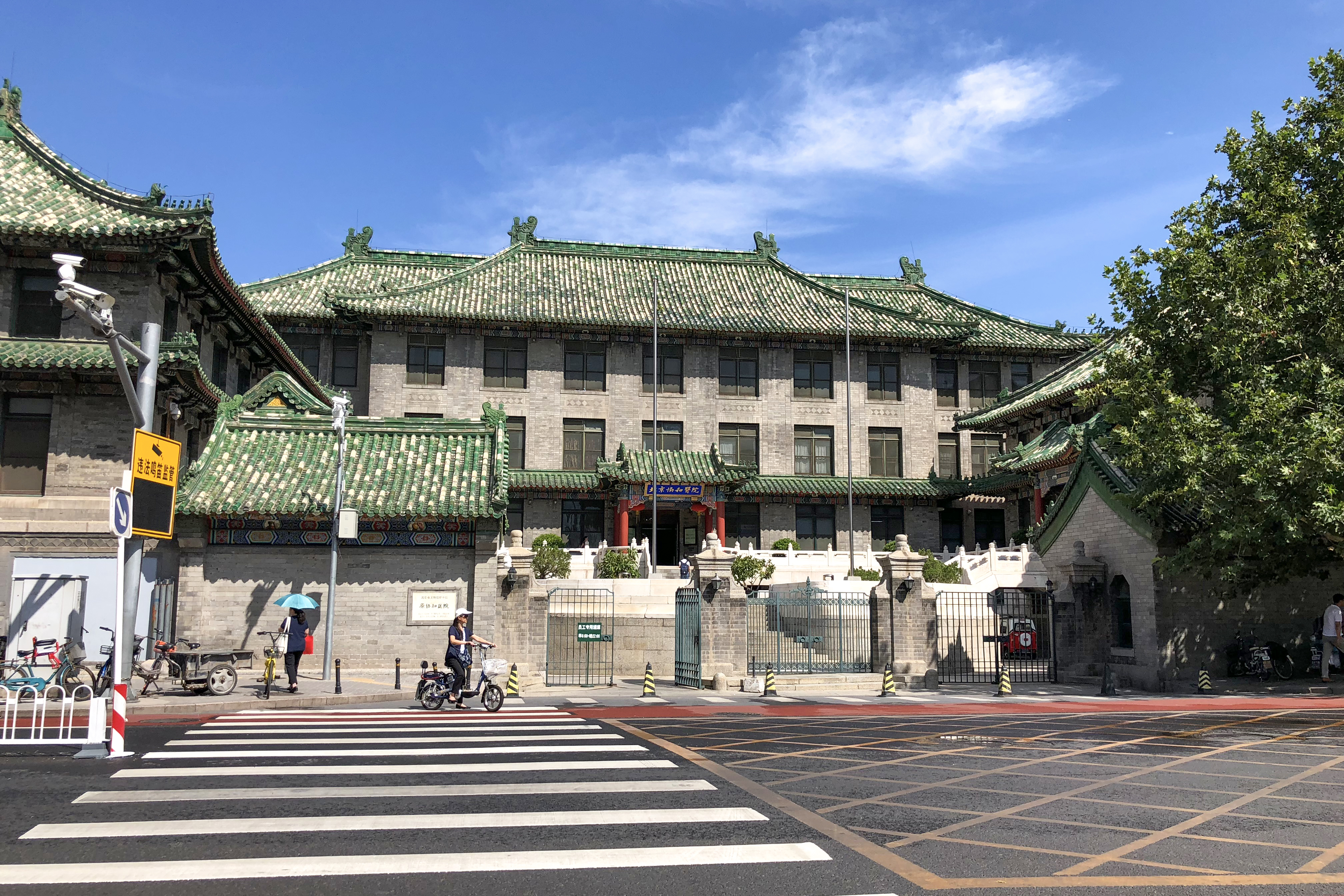
- Old building

Geography
- Location: 1 Shuaifuyuan Wangfujing, Dongcheng District, Beijing, China
- Coordinates: 39.9139°N 116.3681°E

Organisation
- Care system: Public
- Type: Teaching, District General
- Affiliated university: Peking Union Medical College, Chinese Academy of Medical Sciences

Services
- Emergency department: Yes
- Beds: 1800

History
- Founded: 1921

Links
- Website: www.pumch.cn
- Lists: Hospitals in China

Peking Union Medical College Hospital
- Simplified Chinese: 北京协和医院
- Traditional Chinese: 北京協和醫院
Transcriptions
Standard Mandarin
- Hanyu Pinyin: Běijīng Xiéhé Yīyuàn
- Wade–Giles: Pei3-ching1 Hsieh2-ho2 I1-yüan4

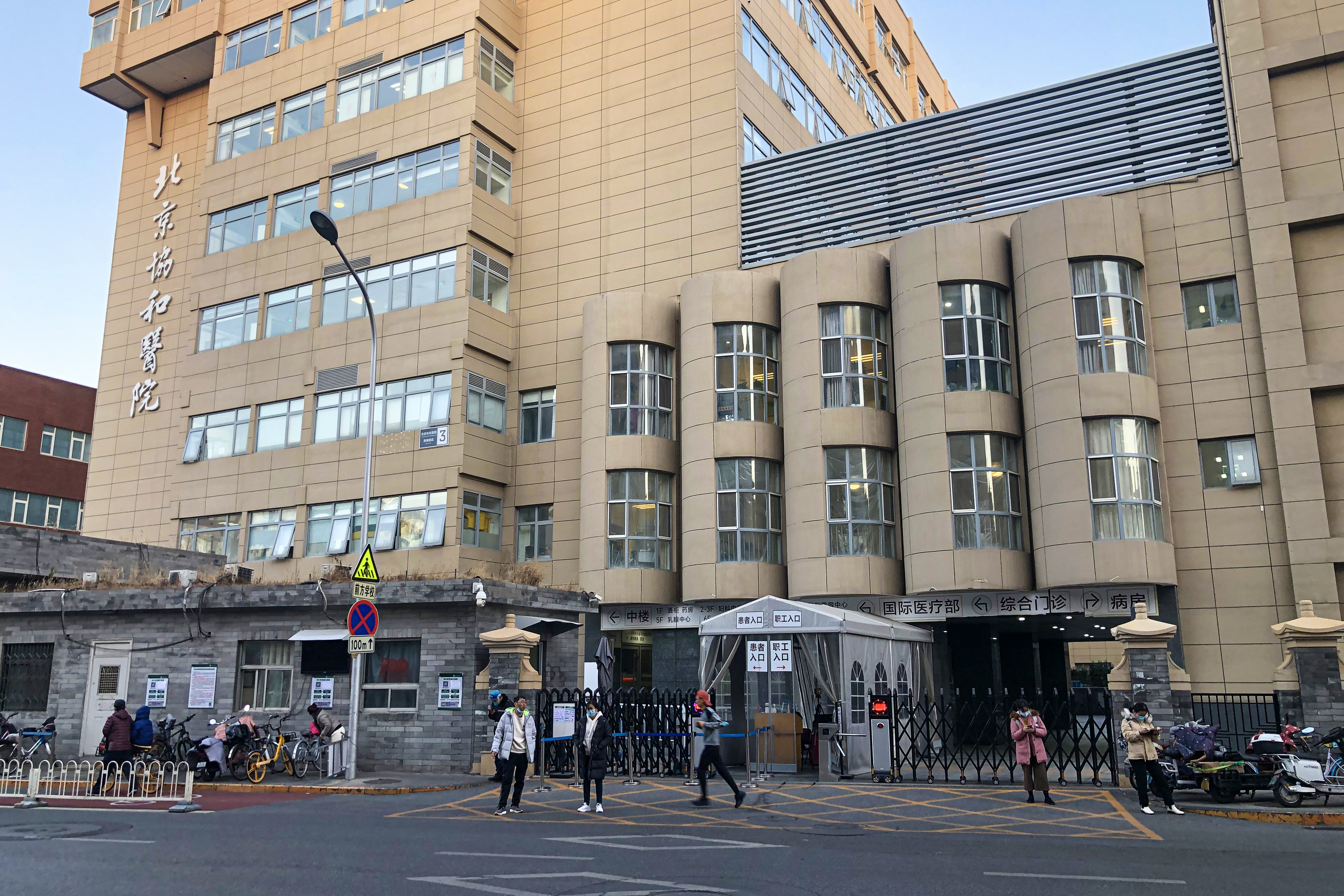
Xidan campus, formerly the Posts and Telecommunications General Hospital which was merged into PUMCH in 2002

Peking Union Medical College Hospital (PUMCH), also known as Peking Union Hospital or Beijing Xiehe Hospital (北京协和医院), is a large teaching hospital in Beijing, China. It was founded in 1921 by the Rockefeller Foundation and is currently affiliated with Peking Union Medical College.

It has two locations: the Dongdan Campus in Wangfujing, Dongcheng District and the Xidan Campus in Damucang Hutong, Xicheng District.

On September 10, 2002, Peking Union Medical College Hospital merged with Post and Telecommunications General Hospital of the Ministry of Information Industry to become Peking Union Medical College Hospital of the Chinese Academy of Medical Sciences.
