= Ministry of Health (China) =

Former government agency in charge of health in China

Ministry of Health of the People's Republic of China
- 中华人民共和国卫生部; Zhōnghuá Rénmín Gònghéguó Wèishēngbù
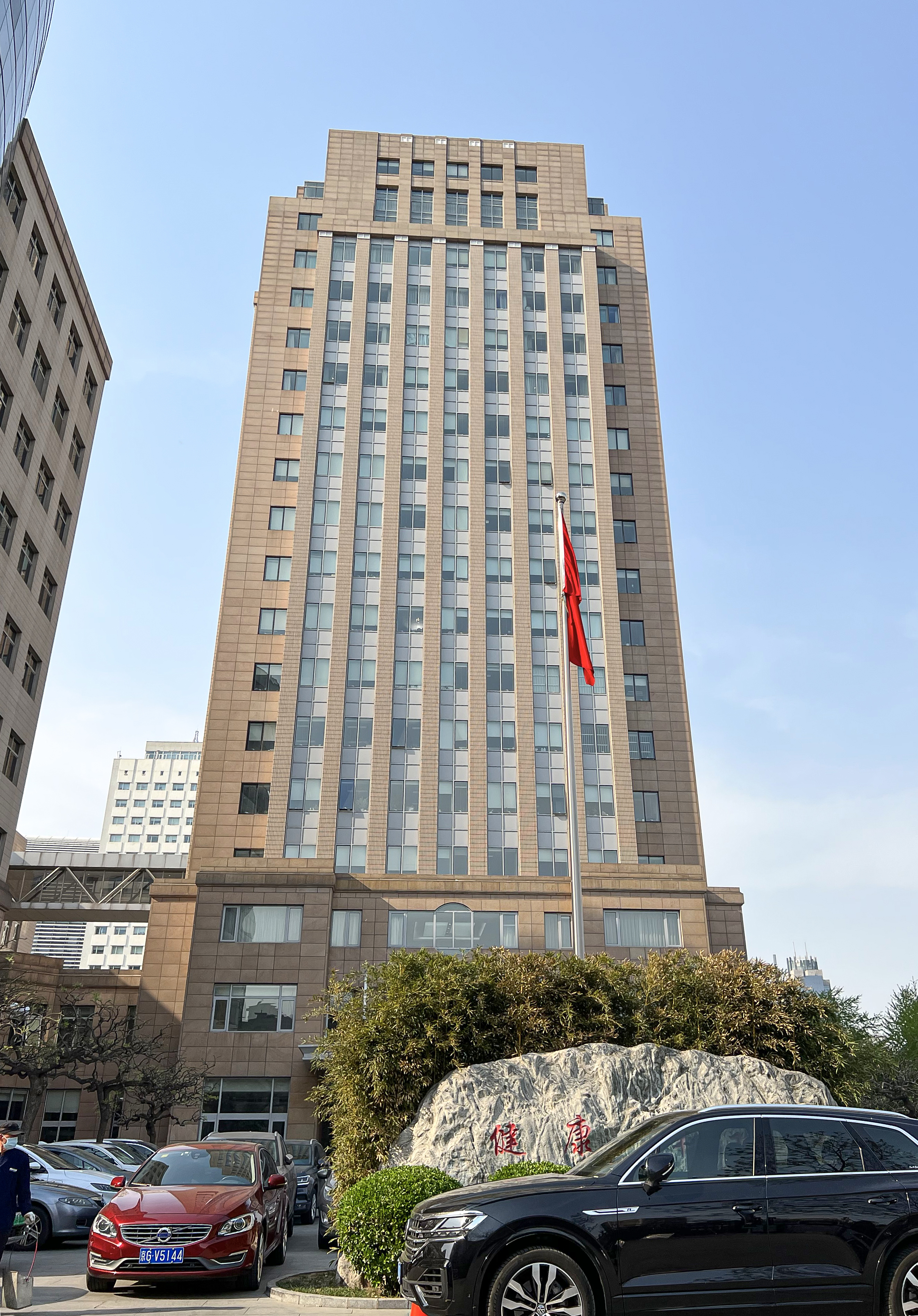
- The building of the former Ministry of Health, also used by its successor

Agency overview
- Formed: 1954
- Preceding agency: Ministry of Health of the Central People's Government
- Dissolved: March 2013
- Superseding agency: National Health and Family Planning Commission
- Type: Constituent Department of the State Council (cabinet-level executive department)
- Jurisdiction: China
- Headquarters: Beijing
- Agency executives: Li Dequan, the first Minister for Health; Chen Zhu, the last Minister for Health
- Parent agency: State Council
- Website: www.moh.gov.cn

The Ministry of Health of the People's Republic of China (MOH) was a cabinet-level executive department which plays the role of providing information, raising health awareness and education, ensuring the accessibility of health services, and monitoring the quality of health services provided to citizens and visitors in the mainland of the People's Republic of China. In the reforms of 2013 the ministry has been dissolved and its functions integrated into the now-dissolved agency called the National Health and Family Planning Commission.

The MOH was also involved in the control of illness and disease, coordinating the utilization of resources and expertise where necessary. It also cooperates and keeps in touch with other health ministries and departments, including those of the special administrative regions, and the World Health Organization (WHO).

As part of the National Health and Family Planning Commission it is now headed by Ms. Li Bin. Until 2013 it was headed by the Minister for Health, a position last held by Chen Zhu who was then the only minister in the State Council, and one of the two ministers who are not members of the Chinese Communist Party. He is the chairman of the Central Committee of the Chinese Peasants' and Workers' Democratic Party, one of the eight legally permissible political parties of the PRC.

== Functions and responsibilities ==
The MOH reports directly to the State Council. Its functions include:

- Drafting laws, regulations, plans and policies related to public health
- Formulating policies for maternity and child-care programs
- Overseeing disease prevention and treatment
- Controlling the spread of epidemics
- Supervising blood collection
- Reforming medical institutions
- Overseeing state hospitals
- Drawing up medical science and technology development projects
- Setting quality standards for foods and cosmetics
- Overseeing medical education and setting related standards
- Controlling the Beijing Medical College and the Chinese Academy of Medical Sciences; and
- Overseeing the State Administration of Traditional Chinese Medicine

== See also ==
- State Council of the People's Republic of China
- Ministries of China
