= Peking Union Medical College =

Chinese medical college

- 北京协和医学院
- Other names: Chinese Academy of Medical Sciences (中国医学科学院)
- Type: Public
- Established: 1917; 109 years ago
- Affiliations: National Health Commission
- President: Xunming Ji
- Location: Beijing, China; 39.9107°N 116.4149°E
- Campus: Urban
- Website: pumc.edu.cn

Chinese name
- Simplified Chinese: 北京协和医学院
- Traditional Chinese: 北京協和醫學院
Transcriptions
Standard Mandarin
- Hanyu Pinyin: Běijīng Xiéhé Yīxué Yuàn

Peking Union Medical College, concurrently known as the Chinese Academy of Medical Sciences, is a public medical college in Dongcheng, Beijing, China. It is affiliated with the National Health Commission of China.

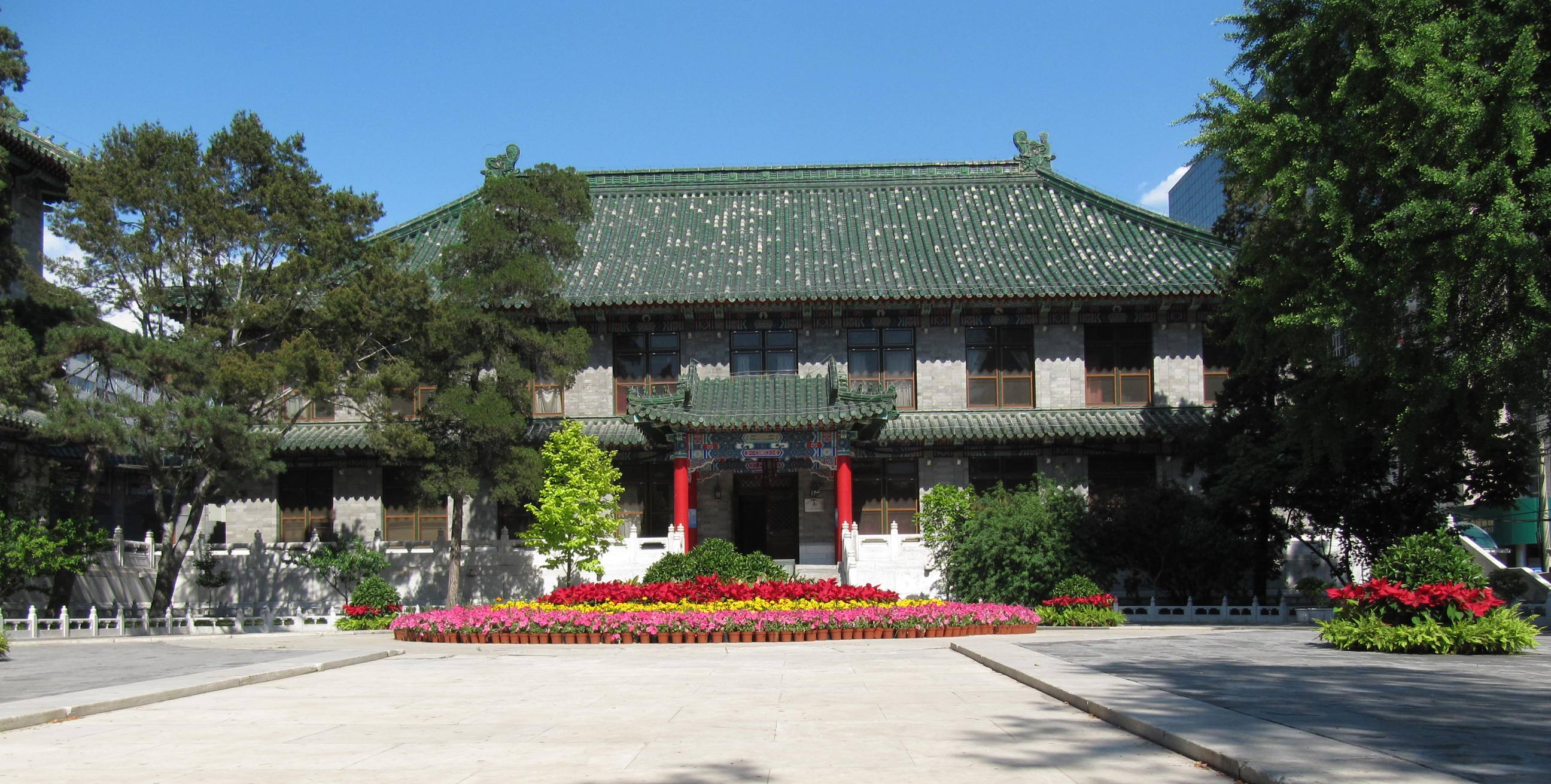
Old building of the Peking Union Medical College in Beijing

Peking Union Medical College's predecessor was founded by the Rockefeller Foundation in 1917. Due to an affiliation with Tsinghua University in 2006, graduates from the medical college will receive diplomas and degrees from both Peking Union Medical College and Tsinghua University upon graduation.

== History ==
The former Union Medical College was founded in 1906, bringing together six smaller missionary colleges.

The Rockefeller Foundation was established in 1913 and in 1913-1914 the newly formed Foundation created a Commission, including Franklin C. McLean, to examine medical education in China. Wu Lien-teh strongly supported the establishment of a new medical college in Peking and made a number of recommendations, all of which were adopted. The Peking Union Medical College was formally established by the Rockefeller Foundation in 1917.

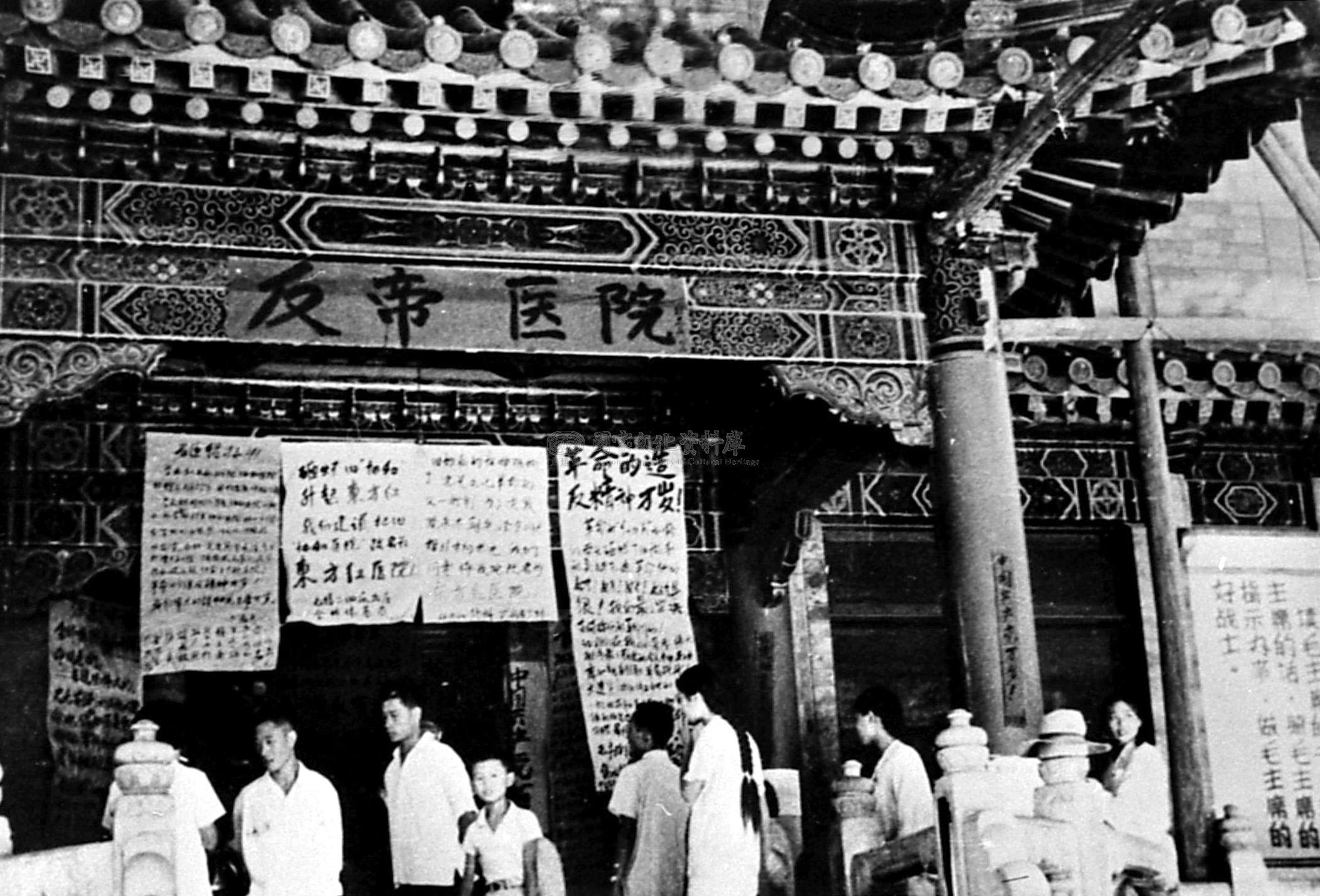
Red Guards occupy PUMC

In 1951, the government of the People's Republic of China nationalized Peking Union Medical College.

In April 2025, Peking Union Medical College was exposed by the media to have launched a clinical medicine doctoral training program in 2018 known as the "4+4" model, which consists of 4 years of non-medical undergraduate education followed by 4 years of medical professional education. The program uses the theory of liberal education as a justification, arguing that doctors should possess a broader knowledge base beyond medicine. This has sparked a debate between liberal education and specialized education. The public has expressed disapproval, claiming that it not only wastes the first four years of undergraduate study but also results in doctors trained under the liberal education theory lacking adequate medical skills. Furthermore, the program has been criticized as a shortcut for children of powerful and wealthy families to quickly obtain a doctoral degree.

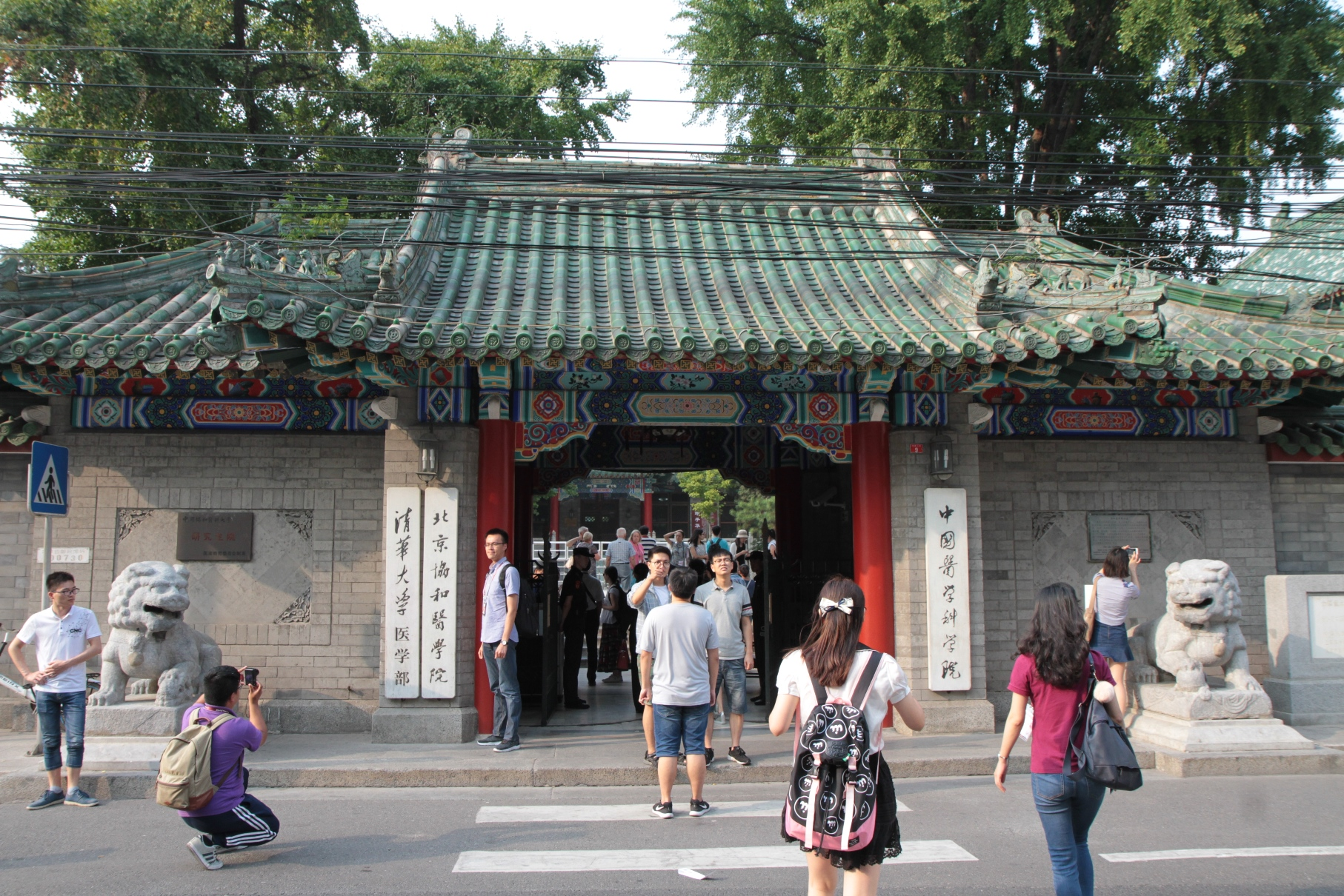
Peking Union Medical College, Tsinghua University Gate

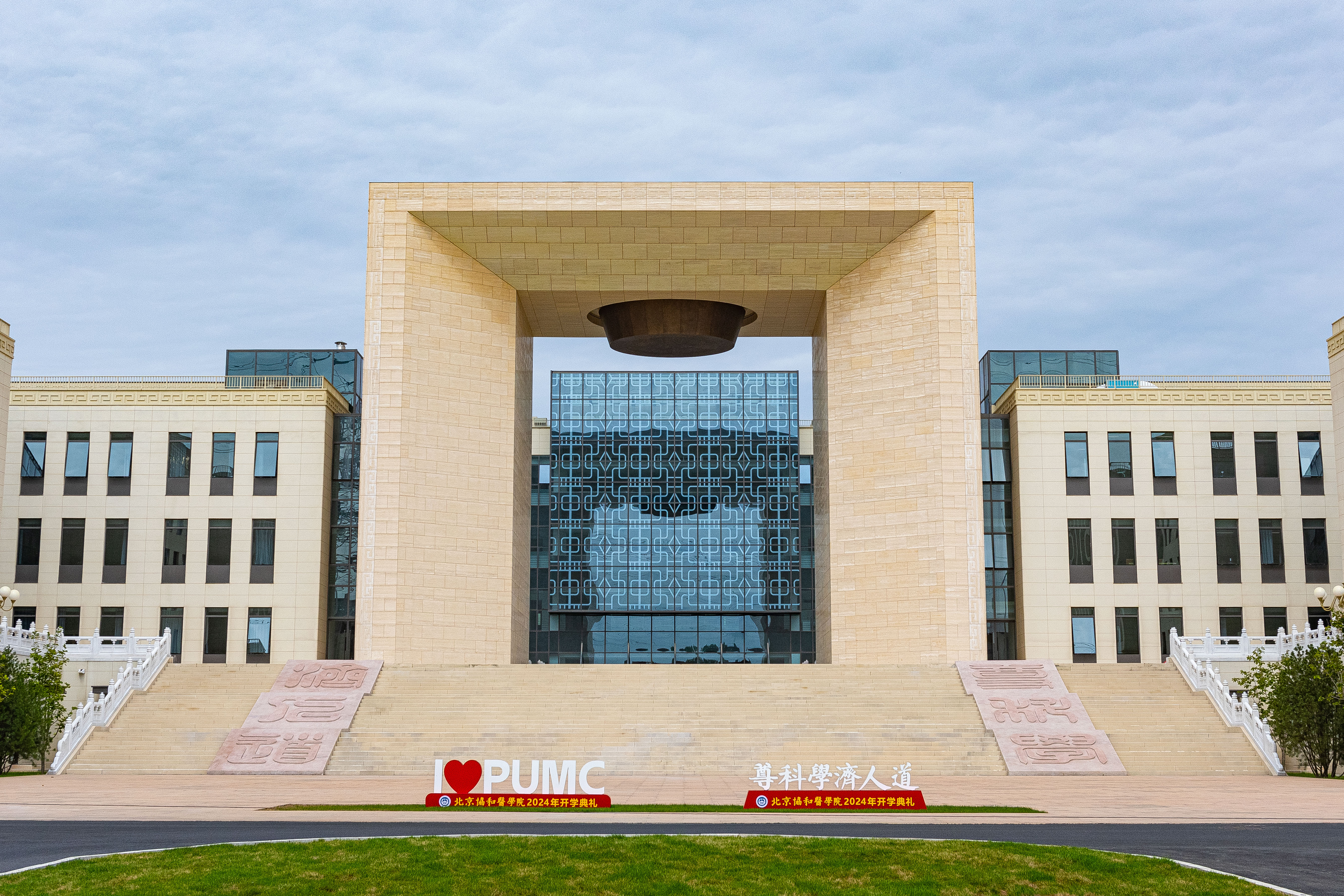
North campus

== Rankings ==
As of 2024, its "Biomedical Engineering" and "Pharmacy & Pharmaceutical Sciences" were ranked 34th and 2nd in the world respectively, while "Biological Sciences" and "Public Health" were placed in the top 100 in the world by the Academic Ranking of World Universities. As of 2025, its "Pharmacology and Toxicology" also ranked 9th globally by the U.S. News & World Report. It is also ranked in "ARWU Best Chinese Universities Ranking - Ranking of Chinese Medical Universities".

== Notes ==
=== References and further reading ===
- Brazelton, Mary Augusta (2015). "Western Medical Education on Trial: The Endurance of Peking Union Medical College, 1949–1985". Twentieth-Century China. 40 (2): 126–145. doi:10.1179/1521538515Z.00000000056. S2CID 71731829.
- Bullock, Mary Brown (1980), An American Transplant: The Rockefeller Foundation and the Peking Union Medical College, Berkeley: University of California Press, ISBN 0520035593
- Cheng, Hu; Jiang, Yuhong (2018). "The Persistent 'Old Peking Union Medical College' in the Mao Era". Journal of American-East Asian Relations. 25 (3): 235–262. doi:10.1163/18765610-02503002.
- Cody, Jeffrey W. (2001). Building in China: Henry K. Murphy's "Adaptive Architecture," 1914-1935. Hong Kong; Seattle: Chinese University Press; University of Washington Press. ISBN 0295980958.
- McLean, Franklin C, Ph.D., Guide to the Franklin C. McLean Papers 1881-1969 (Special Collections Research Center, University of Chicago Library, 2006).
