= Hu Jinguang =

Hu Jinguang (Chinese: 胡锦光; pinyin: Hú Jǐnguāng; born February 1960) is a professor at Renmin University of China Law School, specialized in constitutional law and administrative law.

== Biography ==
Hu Jinguang was born in Huangshan, Anhui in 1960. He received LLM degree from Renmin University of China Department of Law in 1985 and LLD degree from the same law school in 1998. He is the Director of the Constitutional Law Institute of Renmin University of China.

Hu was nominated as the Ten Outstanding Young Jurists in China in 1996. In 2005, he was elected as one of Distinguished Contemporary Chinese Jurists.
