= Li Wenhai =

Li Wenhai may refer to:

- Li Wenhai (historian) (1932–2013), Chinese historian
- Li Wenhai (actor) (born c. 1957), Singaporean actor
