= Zhang Xinbao =

Zhang Xinbao (Chinese: 张新宝; pinyin: Zhāng Xīnbǎo; born December, 1961) is a Chinese civil law scholar, a professor at Renmin University of China Law School.

== Biography ==
Zhang Xinbao was born in Gongan, Hubei. He received his LL.B degree from Southwest College of Political Science and Law in 1984, and LL.M degree from Renmin University of China Department of Law in 1986. Zhang studied the US tort law at Syracuse University from 1991 to 1993. He received his Ph.D degree from Chinese Academy of Social Sciences in 1997.

Zhang Xinbao worked at Chinese Academy of Social Sciences since 1986. He joined the faculty of Renmin University of China in 2002.

In 2002, Zhang Xinbao was selected as one of the "Ten Outstanding Young Jourists" by the China Law Society.
