= Zeng Yixin =

Chinese oncologist and politician

- 曾益新

Deputy Director of the National Health Commission
- Incumbent
- Assumed office March 2017
- Minister: Lei Haichao
- Preceded by: Liu Qian

Personal details
- Born: October 1962 (age 63–64) Lianyuan County, Hunan, China
- Party: Chinese Communist Party
- Education: University of South China; Sun Yat-sen University; University of Tokyo
- Scientific career
- Fields: Oncology

Zeng Yixin (Chinese: 曾益新; pinyin: Zēng Yìxīn; born October 1962) is a Chinese oncologist and politician, and an academician of the Chinese Academy of Sciences.

He was a representative of the 19th National Congress of the Chinese Communist Party and a member of the 19th Central Commission for Discipline Inspection. He is a representative of the 20th National Congress of the Chinese Communist Party and an alternate of the 20th Central Committee of the Chinese Communist Party.

== Biography ==
Zeng was born in Lianyuan County (now Lianyuan), Hunan, in October 1962, but was raised in Huitong County. Zeng joined the Chinese Communist Party (CCP) in December 1984. In 1985, he graduated from Hengyang Medical College(now University of South China), and went on to receive his doctor's degree in medicine from Zhongshan Medical Sciences University (now Sun Yat-sen University) in 1990. In July 1990, he became an attending doctor at the Guangdong Provincial People's Hospital. He carried out postdoctoral research at Tokyo Institute for the Elderly and the University of Tokyo in July 1992, and became a research assistant at the Hughes Institute of Medicine, University of Pennsylvania in January 1995.

Zeng returned to China in 1997 and that same year became deputy director and director of the Sun Yat-sen University Cancer Center in March, in addition to serving as director of Cancer Research Institute and president of Cancer Hospital.

In August 2010, he became vice president of Peking Union Medical College, rising to president the next year. In November 2015, he was made president of Beijing Hospital, a post he kept until February 2017. He was appointed deputy director of the National Health Commission in February 2017, concurrently serving as deputy director of the Central Health Commission.

== Honours and awards ==
- 2005 Member of the Chinese Academy of Sciences (CAS)

Educational offices
Preceded by Liu Depei	President of Peking Union Medical College; 2011–2015	Succeeded by Cao Xuetao
Civic offices
Preceded by Lin Jiabin	President of Beijing Hospital; 2015–2017	Succeeded by Wang Jianye
Government offices
Preceded by Liu Qian	Deputy Director of the National Health Commission; 2011–	Incumbent
