= Shi Yan =

Shi Yan may refer to:

- Shi Yan (farmer)
- Shi Yan (footballer)
