= Gong Yinbing =

Chinese banker and politician

- 龚饮冰

Vice Minister of Light Industry
- In office 1949–1957
- Minister: Huang Yanpei; Jia Tuofu

Personal details
- Born: 1896 Changsha County, Hunan, China
- Died: June 26, 1976 (aged 79–80) Beijing, China
- Party: Kuomintang; Chinese Communist Party
- Relations: Gong Ke
- Children: Gong Yuzhi
- Education: Hunan University

Chinese name
- Simplified Chinese: 龚饮冰
- Traditional Chinese: 龔飲冰
Transcriptions
Standard Mandarin
- Hanyu Pinyin: Gōng Yǐnbīng

Gong Zaiseng
- Simplified Chinese: 龚再僧
- Traditional Chinese: 龔再僧
Transcriptions
Standard Mandarin
- Hanyu Pinyin: Gōng Zàisēng

Gong Zehong
- Simplified Chinese: 龚泽鸿
- Traditional Chinese: 龔澤鴻
Transcriptions
Standard Mandarin
- Hanyu Pinyin: Gōng Zéhòng

Zhang Ruochen
- Simplified Chinese: 张若臣
- Traditional Chinese: 張若臣
Transcriptions
Standard Mandarin
- Hanyu Pinyin: Zhāng Ruóchén

Gong Yinbing (Chinese: 龚饮冰; 1896 – 26 June 1976) was a Chinese banker and politician. He was a delegate to the 6th National Congress of the Chinese Communist Party. He was a delegate to the 1st National People's Congress and the 2nd and 3rd Standing Committee of the National People's Congress. He a member of the 2nd National Committee of the Chinese People's Political Consultative Conference the 3rd Standing Committee of the Chinese People's Political Consultative Conference.

== Biography ==
Gong was born into a landlord family in Changsha County, Hunan, in 1896. He graduated from Hunan University. After the 1911 Revolution, he joined the Kuomintang and took part in the struggle against Yuan Shikai and the Constitutional Protection Movement.

Influenced by communism during the May Fourth Movement, he joined the Chinese Communist Party in 1923. He mainly engaged in propaganda, intelligence and financial work secretly in Changsha, Wuhan, Shanghai, Jinan, Chongqing, and British Hong Kong. After Shanghai was controlled by the People's Liberation Army in May 1949, he was appointed as a member of the Financial Takeover Committee of the Shanghai Military Control Commission and general manager of the Bank of China.

After the establishment of the Communist State in 1949, he successively served as vice minister of light industry and deputy head of United Front Work Department. During the Cultural Revolution, he was brought to be persecuted and suffered political persecution.

On 26 June 1976, he died from an illness in Beijing, aged 80.

== Family ==
His son Gong Yuzhi was a Chinese Communist Party theorist and politician. His grandson Gong Ke is an electronic engineer and administrator who served as president of Tianjin University from 2006 to 2011 and president of Nankai University from 2011 to 2018.
