= Huang Da =

Chinese economist (1925–2023)

Huang Da (Chinese: 黄达; pinyin: Huáng Dá; 22 February 1925 – 18 February 2023) was a Chinese economist who was the president of Renmin University of China. He is regarded as the founder of modern financial research in China.

== Life and career ==
Huang Da was born in Tianjin to an intellectual family in 1925. He was educated at Huabei Union University (华北联合大学), later Renmin University of China. He was the president of Renmin University of China from 1991 to 1994. He was a founding member of the Monetary Policy Commission of the People's Bank of China, serving from 1997 to 1999.

Huang was especially known for his "four textbooks" in finance - On Socialist Financial Questions (1981, 社会主义财政金融问题), An Introduction to General Finance-Credit Balance (1984, 财政信贷综合平衡导论), Economics of Money and Banking (1992, 货币银行学), and Finance (2004, 金融学).

Huang died on 18 February 2023, four days shy of reaching age 98.

Academic offices
Preceded by Yuan Baohua	President of Renmin University of China; 1991–1994	Succeeded by Li Wenhai
