= Shiology =

Approach to food policy focusing on the eater

Shiology is an emerging interdisciplinary knowledge system that holistically studies human "eat + food" affairs. It centres on the needs and perspectives of eaters, prioritising survival, health, social harmony, and sustainability, while examining interactions between eaters, food supply chains, and global governance structures.

Unlike traditional disciplines such as agronomy (focused on food production), food science (emphasizing processing and safety), or fragmented food policies and food systems approaches (often siloed across nutrition, agriculture, and environment), Shiology integrates these into a unified, eater-centric framework. It addresses root causes of interconnected crises—like hunger, malnutrition, waste, and ecological impacts—by revealing objective laws of "shiance" (human food acquisition and utilisation) and advocating holistic governance to support the United Nations Sustainable Development Goals (SDGs).

Promoted through the biennial World Shiology Forum and supported by research centres (e.g., at Renmin University of China and the University of Pisa), Shiology has gained recognition as a public knowledge system for systemic food challenges.

Shiology places a great importance on food education with policies inspired by Shiology implementing greater food education in schools, from cooking lessons to eating etiquette.

== Creation and background ==
Shiology was established from scratch by Liu Guangwei, founder and director-general of the World Shiology Forum, in February 2019. “Shiology” is a combination of the Chinese pinyin “shi” and English suffix “-ology”. The character “shi” in Chinese has two meanings including the verb "eat", as well as the noun "food".

The 4th World Shiology Forum concluded, in the Hainan Initiative, that, “We need a new knowledge system - shiology - that covers all the 'eat and food' issues related to the SDGs, to comprehensively recognise the issues and holistically govern them, setting the eaters at the centre of the approach, and thus promote the implementation of the 2030 Agenda for Sustainable Development,"

== Shiance ==
Shiance is a coined term formed by combining the pinyin “shi” (eat+food) with the suffix "-ance". As a new term in Shiology, it refers to any human activity related to food acquisition, utilization and the consequential outcomes of the activity. Shiance includes not only eating, drinking, survival, health, but also food planting, breeding, cooking, fermentation. It further covers the maintenance of food order involved in the law, economy, administration, education, and other fields.

"Shiance" encompasses not just Eatance but includes fields of food acquisition, eaters’ needs, and Shiance order.

The Shiance triangle defines the domain of Shiance, encompassing interactions among the food ecosystem, the Shiance behaviour system, and the food converting system. The essential connection among these systems is that Shiance behavior system acquires food from the food ecosystem and then supplies it to the food converting system. After the food converting system utilizes the food, waste and human remains are returned to the food system.

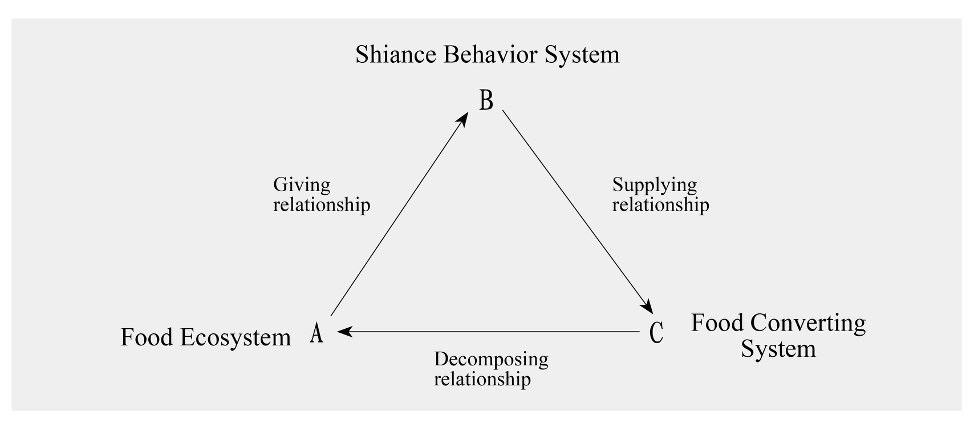
The Shiance Triangle

=== Shiance development ===
From June 25 to 26, 2019, the Third World Shiology Forum was held on Awaji Island, Japan. During the forum, the Awaji Island Declaration was released, establishing the “Four Major Shiance Consensus,” and marking the emergence of the term “Shiance.”

In 2020, the second edition of Shiology was published. It argues that human food-related issues are highly complex, like a tangled web that has persisted for centuries and presents a systematic framework of “Shiance-related problems”.

On May 22, 2024, the paper Shiology Terminology: Revealing the Connotation and Extension of Core Concepts in Shiance Cognition was first published online, elaborating on 33 key terms related to Shiance.

Shiance is fundamental to human survival and a prerequisite for sustainable development. Human history suggests that Shiance dates back more than 5.5 million years, long preceding the emergence of civilization.

== Eatance ==
Eatance is a coined term formed by combining “eat” with the suffix -ance. As a basic term in Shiology, it refers to human phenomena and activities related to ingesting food, including eating, drinking, and taking medicine.

Eatance practice is divided into three stages: pre- eating, during- eating, and post-eating.

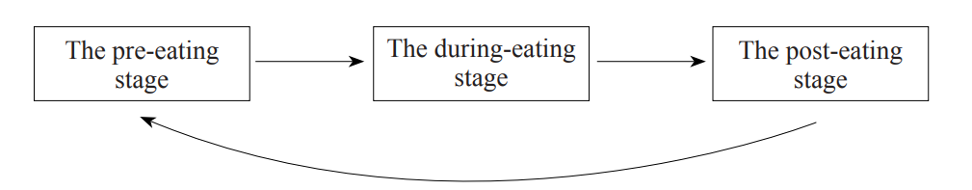

• Pre-eating stage, follows the “three assessments”: assessing physical needs, identifying food types, and considering seasonal conditions. • During-eating stage, follows the “seven pairings”: quantity, variety, frequency, temperature, speed, sequence, and the balance between raw and cooked foods. • Post-eating stage, implements the “two evaluations”: monitoring excretion and observing bodily responses.

The entire process is visually presented through the “Dial-Based Dietary Guide” (also referred to as the “Dial-Based Eating Guide”).

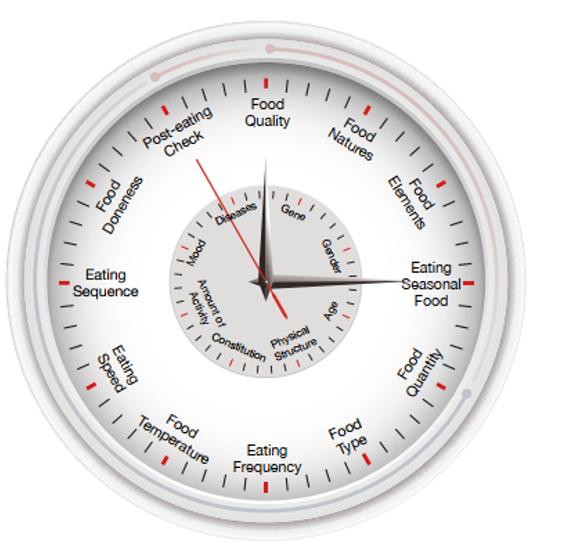

Eating affects health in five ways: (1) constituting the body, (2) satisfying hunger, (3) preventing disease, (4) treating disease, and (5) causing disease.

There are five Eatance principles: body-driven food transformation, body–food coupling, food-induced disease, food as therapy, and five-sense aesthetic principles.

== Eatology ==
Eatology is a coined term formed by combining “eat” with the suffix -ology. It is a knowledge system that explores and reveals the objective relationship between eating practices and human health and longevity.

It studies how to achieve health and longevity through proper eating, effective nourishment, and solutions to eating-related problems. It also examines the connections and laws governing food intake, disease treatment, and physical health, and serves as a knowledge system to improve food utilization efficiency.

This discipline categorizes eating functions into three types: nourishing, regulating, and therapeutic, corresponding respectively to maintaining health, correcting suboptimal states, and treating diseases.

Eatology is a third-level sub-discipline under Shiology and falls into the category of eater’s need.

The system comprises five secondary subfields: methodology of eating, aesthetics of eating, pathology of eating, therapeutic eating of biased substances, and therapeutic eating of synthetic substances.

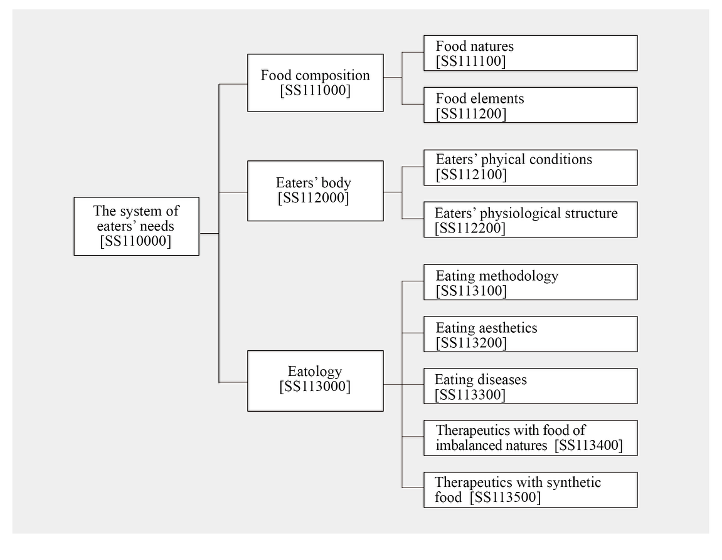

The core theories of Eatology possess three key characteristics: universality, practicality, and sustainability.

Eatology has three fundamental tasks: to extend individual lifespan, to promote the evolution of global order, and to sustain the continuation of the species.

== World Shiology Forum ==
The World Shiology Forum (WSF) is an international conference that brings together global experts in food science and agriculture from five key sectors: 1) policymakers, 2) academia, 3) industry, 4) finance and foundations, and 5) both mainstream and social media.

Shiology aligns closely with the United Nations’ Sustainable Development Goals (SDGs). Because of this, Shiology Founder Mr. Liu Guangwei was invited to give a presentation in 2019 to the United Nations Headquarters.

With the World Shiology Forum formerly known as The World Eatology Forum, five forums and one summit have been successfully held in Beijing (China), Osaka (Japan), Istanbul (Turkey), and Hainan (China) . The most recent forum was hosted in Haikou, Hainan from 28 to 31 October 2025. The next World Shiology Forum is expected to be hosted in 2027, but the location and date have yet to be announced.

Each World Shiology Forum Covers a different shiance topic.

World Eatology/ Shiology Forums & World Eatology Summits
Forum	Host City, Country	Host Date	Topic
1st World Food Forum	Beijing, People's Republic of China	21–24 May 2017	“The Belt and Road, Food Leads the Way” issued with Yiyin Initiative
2nd World Food Forum	Beijing, People's Republic of China	20–22 May 2018	“Food Production and Utilisation”
3rd Wold Shiology Forum	Osaka, Japan	24–26 June 2019	“SDGs and Food Issues” issued with Awaji Island Declaration
3rd World Eatology Summit	Istanbul, Turkey	18–19 December 2020	“Eatology-With A Multidimensional Approach Holistically Solve Food Issues” issued with Istanbul Declaration of Eatology
4th World Shiology Forum	Haikou, People's Republic of China	10–11 October 2023	“Sustainable Development Goals (SDGs)” issued with Hainan Initiative
5th World Shiology Forum	Haikou, People's Republic of China	28–31 October 2025	“A Holistic Approach to Addressing Food System Challenges through Shiology”

=== The 3rd World Shiology Forum ===
The 3rd World Shiology Forum – Turkey Summit was held in Istanbul,Turkey with the theme “Eatology-With A Multidimensional Approach Holistically Solve Food Issues.” The forum released its outcome document, the Istanbul Declaration of Eatology.

=== The 4th World Shiology Forum ===
Over 100 participants from 43 countries had the honor of receiving a written message from UN Secretary-General António Guterres, reinforcing the forum's truly global reach.

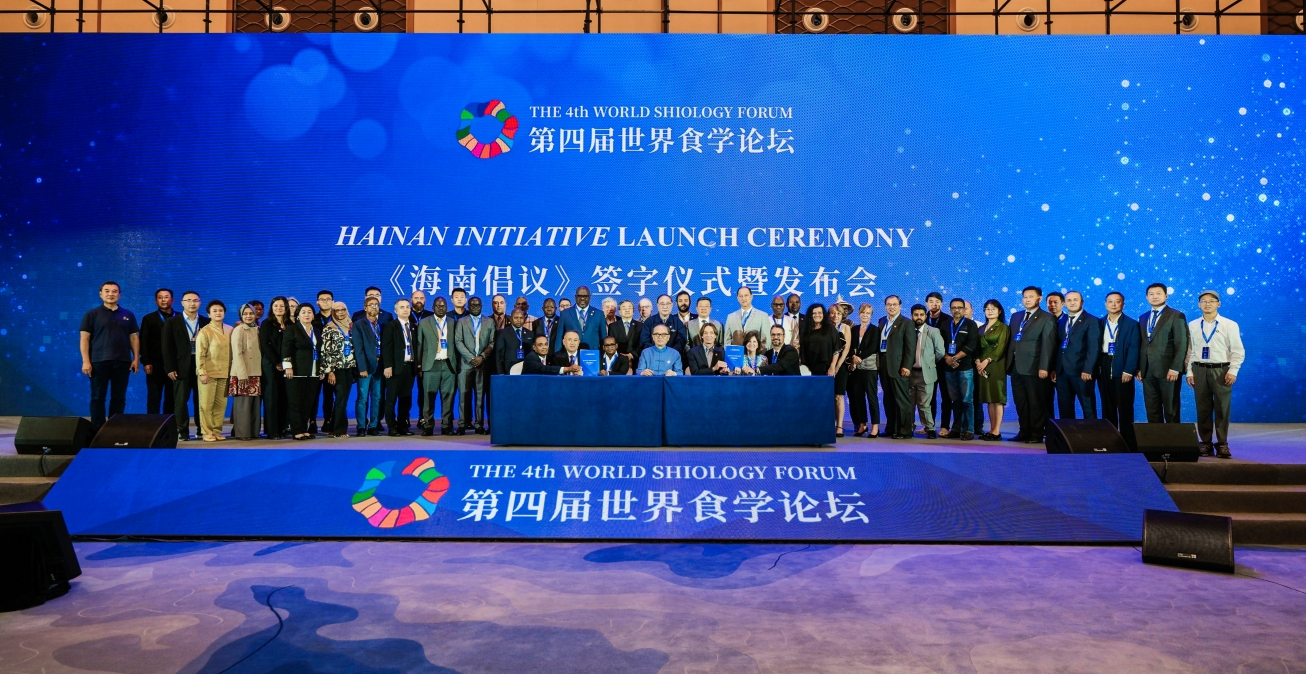
A group photo at the 4th World Shiology Forum, Hainan, China

The 4th WSF was primarily academically focused, aiming to establish global recognition and consensus around Shiology's potential. The theme for this forum was “Sustainable Development Goals (SDGs)” and the Hainan Initiative was issued.

=== The 5th World Shiology Forum ===
The 5th World Shiology Forum was successfully held from 28 to 31 October 2025 in Hainan (China), under the theme, “A Holistic Approach to Addressing Food System Challenges through Shiology”. The forum brought together over 300 on-site participants, including representatives from the United Nations and its affiliated agencies, along with delegates from 55 countries. The event also attracted coverage from both international and domestic social media outlets.

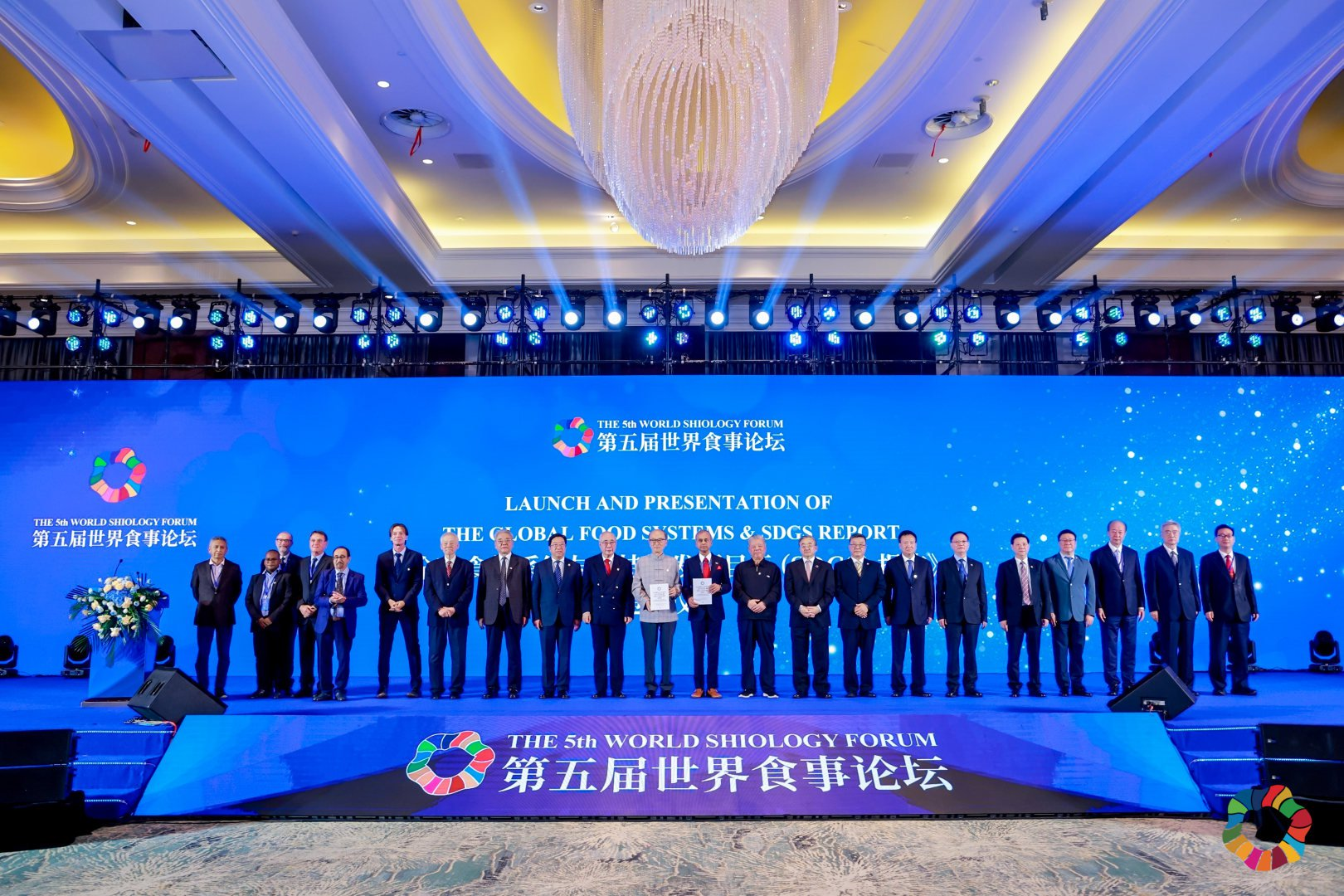
A group photo at the 5th World Shiology Forum, Hainan, China

UN Secretary-General António Guterres sent a written message to the forum, in which he wrote “we must act together to create food systems that sustain both people and planet. The holistic principles of Shiology can help light the way.”

Within the 5th WSF, the Global Food Systems and SDGs Report 2025 was officially launched and formally presented to the United Nations representative. The report was developed with contributions from more than 100 collaborators, serving as co-authors representing the UN Member States.

In the preface of the report, Ban Ki-moon, former Secretary-General of the United Nations, described Shiology as “a framework that integrates food, eaters and food order that provides a full-chain approach to understanding food system issues.”

This perspective has also been echoed by many international institutions. In a letter of support, Lok Bahadur Thapa, President of the United Nations Economic and Social Council (ECOSOC), noted that “the work of the forum and its participants have made valuable contributions to addressing global challenges such as food shortages, food waste, and unequal access to proper nutrition.”

Discussions about how indigenous populations are being impacted by climate change, how education can play a crucial role in Shiology and sustainability and how governing systems should be reformed to improve the sustainability of food systems took place during the 5th WSF. The conference culminated with a tour of Shiance industries in Hainan.

The Forum announced the opening of a new Shiology Research Institute at the University of Pisa, the second such centre to exist, and the first in Europe.

The forum ended by publishing the 'Global Food Systems & SDGs Report', outlining the importance of food policies in the realisation of the UN's Sustainable Development Goals.

== United Nations Recognition and Engagement ==
Shiology and the World Shiology Forum have received endorsements from United Nations leadership, highlighting the discipline's alignment with global efforts to transform food systems and advance SDGs.

At the 4th World Shiology Forum in 2023, UN Secretary-General António Guterres sent a written message, greeting participants and urging the international community to address the global food crisis by making food systems more sustainable, equitable, and resilient and ensuring that "the men and women who bring food systems to life" must be supported. He emphasised the need for scientific and technological innovations to improve healthy food access while reducing water consumption and carbon emissions.

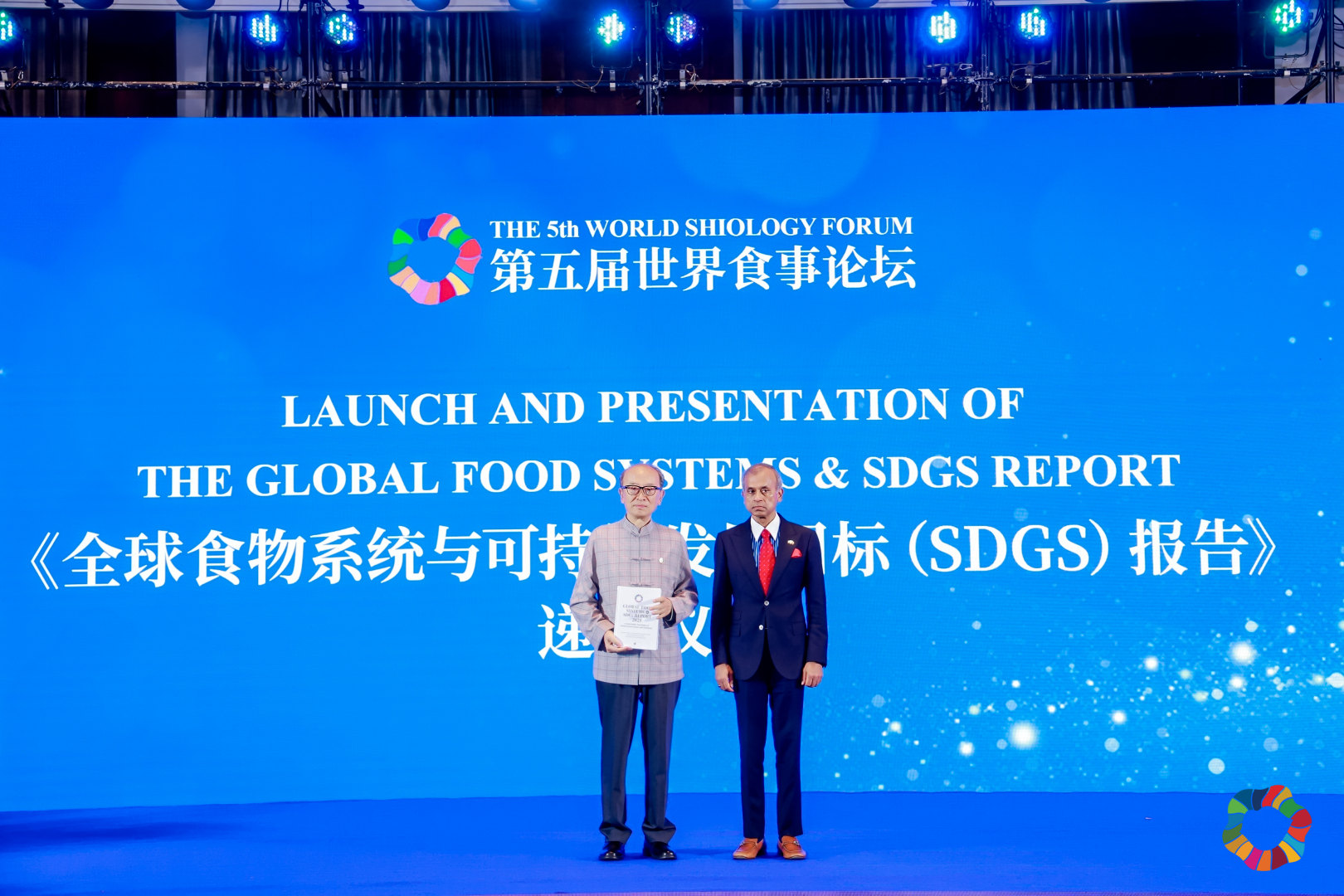
Launch and Presentation of The Global Food Systems & SDGs Report to UN Representative

For the 5th World Shiology Forum in October 2025, Secretary-General Guterres again provided a written message, read on site, stating that the holistic principle of Shiology "points the way for exploring the path of human coexistence" and stressing the interdependence of society, ecosystems, and the economy for building resilience. Dr Siddharth Chatterjee, the UN Resident Coordinator in China, was also a keynote speaker at the 5th World Shiology Forum.

Additionally, former UN Secretary-General Ban Ki-moon contributed a foreword to the 'Global Food Systems and Sustainable Development Goals (SDGs) Report 2025', released at the end of the 5th Forum. Moon highlighted the complexity of food system challenges and explicitly endorsed Shiology, stating that "Shiology is such a knowledge system" needed for comprehensive coverage of the entire food system.

== Research and Education ==
Shiology research centres exist at Renmin University (China) and now Pisa (Italy), with over 100 co-authors contributing to global reports. Educational efforts include culinary integrations (e.g., Global Culinary Alliance) and primary school programs on eating etiquette. Publications like Liu's An Introduction to Shiology (2023) provide foundational texts.

Since January 2026, the Beijing Shiology Research Centre has published a 'Shiology Newsletter'. Articles in the first issue included contributions from Dr Saheeda Mujaffar (University of the West Indies (Trinidad and Tobago)), as well as an article from highlighting the "contributions of the World Shiology Forum" in a letter from Lok Bahadur Thapa (President of the United Nations Economic and Social Council).

In September 2026, at the International Food Symposium held at Hong Kong Polytechnic University, Liu Guangwei, chairman of the World Shiology Forum and director of the Shiology Research Center at Renmin University of China, proposed that Hong Kong upgrade its established “City of Gastronomy” identity into a “World Longevity Capital” brand. The proposal linked Hong Kong’s high life-expectancy statistics with Shiology’s framework of the eater–food–eating-order triad and suggested developing related dietary standards, health services, and industries. The idea was publicly endorsed by the International Brand Academy.

== Liu Guangwei ==
=== Early life and education ===
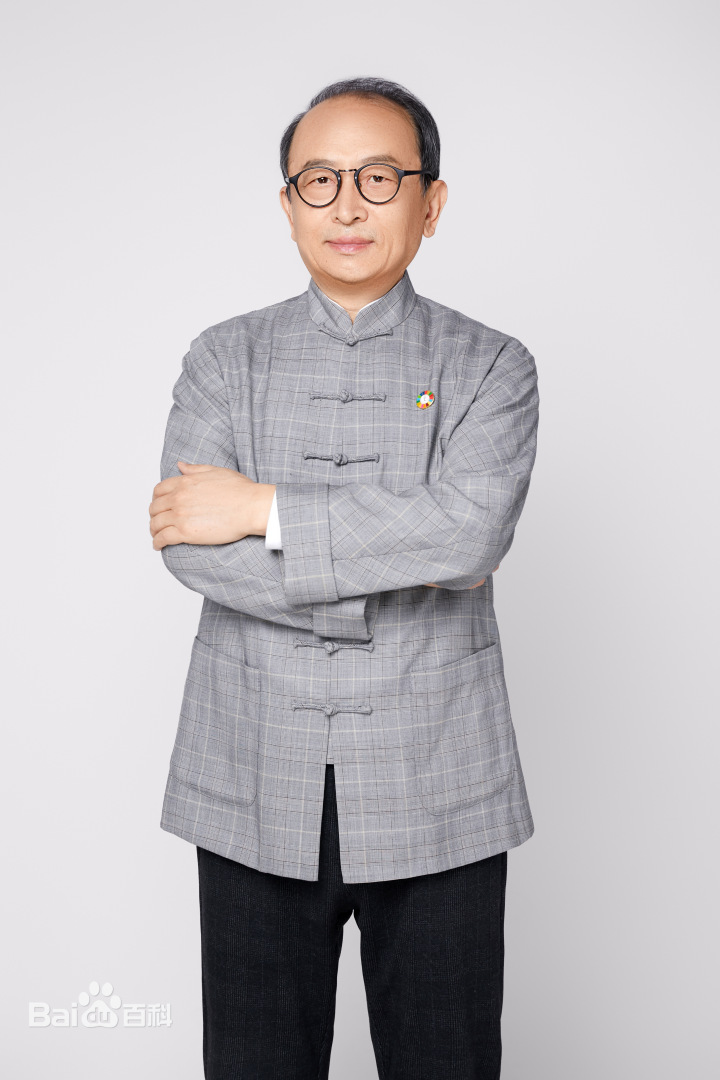
Mr Liu Guangwei, Director of the Shiology Research Center at Renmin University of China, President of the Beijing Shiology Research Institute and the Director-General of the World Shiology Forum.

Liu Guangwei was born in Beijing, China and spent part of his early life in Shandong Province, where he engaged in agricultural work. In 1978, Liu was admitted to Jinan Business School and later became a faculty member after his college graduation.

=== Career ===
In 1986, Liu was assigned to the Shandong Provincial Tourism Bureau. He was involved in the founding the Shandong Cuisine Society, where he served as Executive Deputy Secretary-General and Vice President. He also worked as an executive chef in Shandong before founding Oriental Cuisine, a monthly culinary magazine, and establishing the Oriental Culinary School. Liu organized several academic seminars on culinary education and edited over 20 professional publications.

In 2018, the Theory of 34 Chinese Cuisines was put forward by Liu, which established a five-level system consisting of Chinese cuisine, regional cuisines, genres, schools and dishes.

Liu subsequently introduced interdisciplinary framework known as "Shiology”, a holistic system that studies the relationship between food, eaters, and broader social systems. He currently serves as the Director of the Shiology Research Center at Renmin University of China; President of the Beijing Shiology Research Institute; Director-General of the World Shiology Forum; and executive director of Shiology Branch, China Association of Vocational and Technical Education.

=== Founder of World Shiology Forum ===
Liu founded the World Shiology Forum in 2017 as a platform to address global food systems and related issues. The forum, held biennially, has taken place in Beijing, China; Osaka, Japan; Istanbul, Turkey; and Hainan, China. The 2019 forum in Osaka, Japan was officially recognized as a side event of the G20 Osaka Summit.

The World Shiology Forum aligns with the United Nations' Sustainable Development Goals (SDGs) and aims to discuss the global food crisis and systemic challenges.

=== Academic work and Shiology ===
Liu proposed Shiology as an academic system addressing the relationship between humans, food, and global challenges, with a focus on global food security, health, and sustainability.

Liu has authored books such as Shiology, which outlines key concepts and frameworks in Shiology, and other foundational works. His academic contributions have led to the establishment of Shiology research centers at Renmin University of Chinaand Pisa University in Italy.

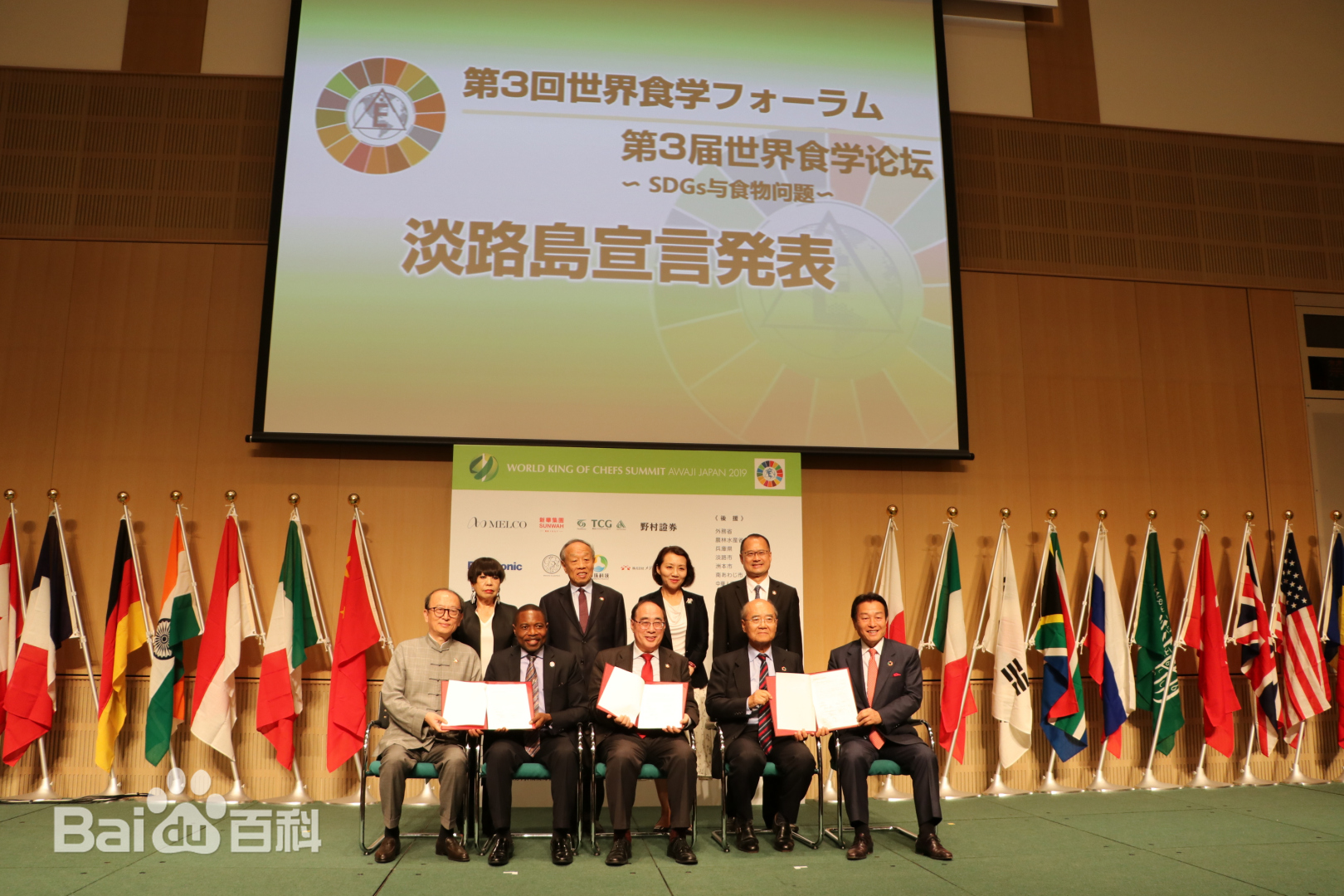
Launch of Awaji Initiative at the 2019 Forum in Awaji Island, Japan

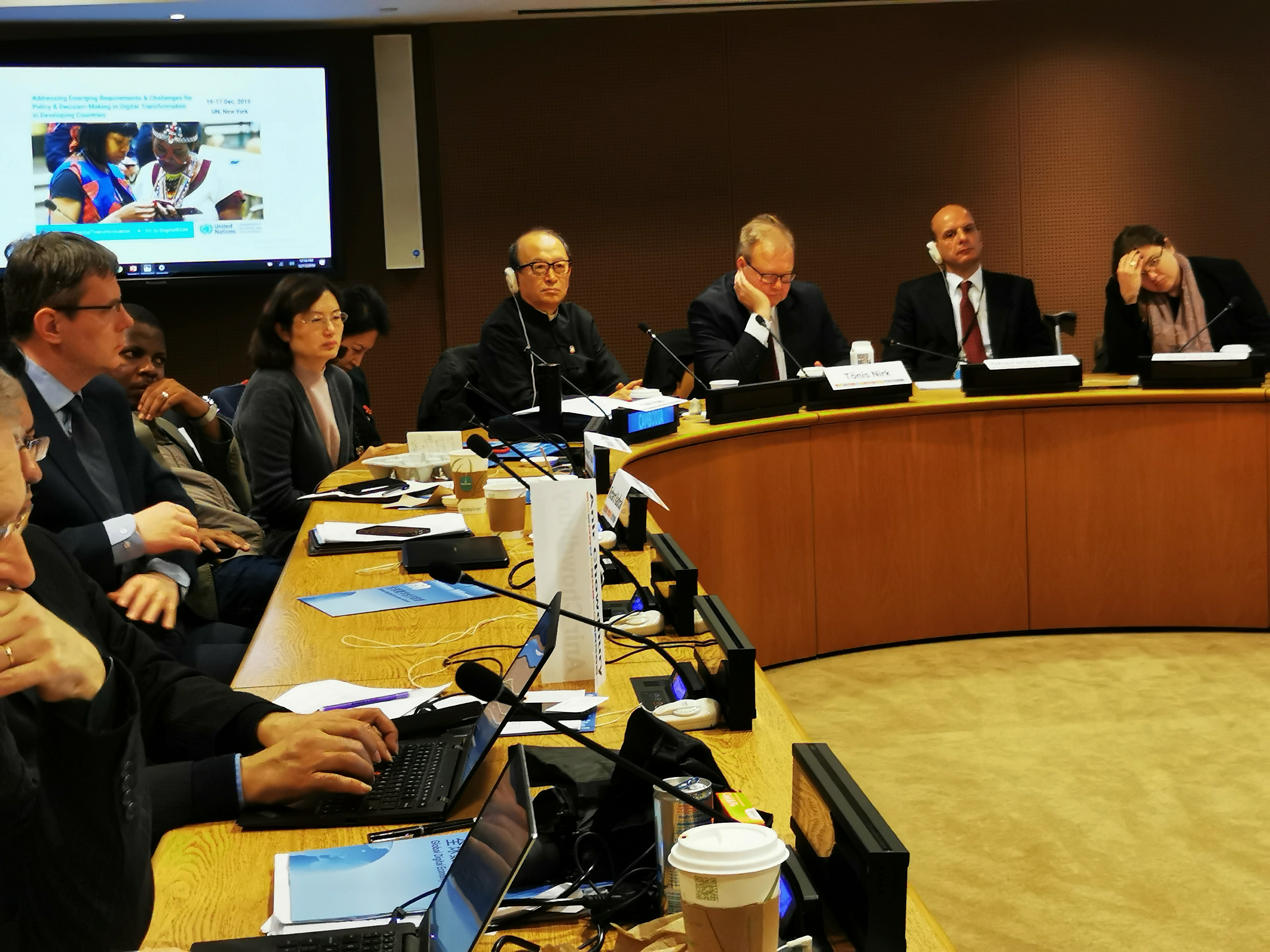
Mr Liu at the EGM in the UN Headquarters

=== International engagement ===
Liu has actively participated in international conferences and policy discussions related to global food systems. In 2019, he attended a United Nations expert group meeting in New York, organized by the Department of Economic and Social Affairs (UN DESA), to discuss the role of digital transformation in food policy.

The United Nations has recognized the World Shiology Forum and its alignment with global efforts to address food security, health, and environmental sustainability.

=== Publications ===
Liu has written extensively on Shiology, including theoretical works and educational resources aimed at expanding the discipline. His work has been published in various academic journals, including Journal of Northeast Agricultural University.

=== Awards ===
In 2000, he represented China at the 20th International Exhibition of Culinary Art (Culinary Olympics) in Germany, earning a Merit Award.

In August 2019, he was inducted as an Honorary Fellow of the American Academy of Chefs for his innovative theories on the aesthetics of culinary arts and the coding system of culinary products.
