= Beijing Hospital =

北京医院 Beijing Hospital
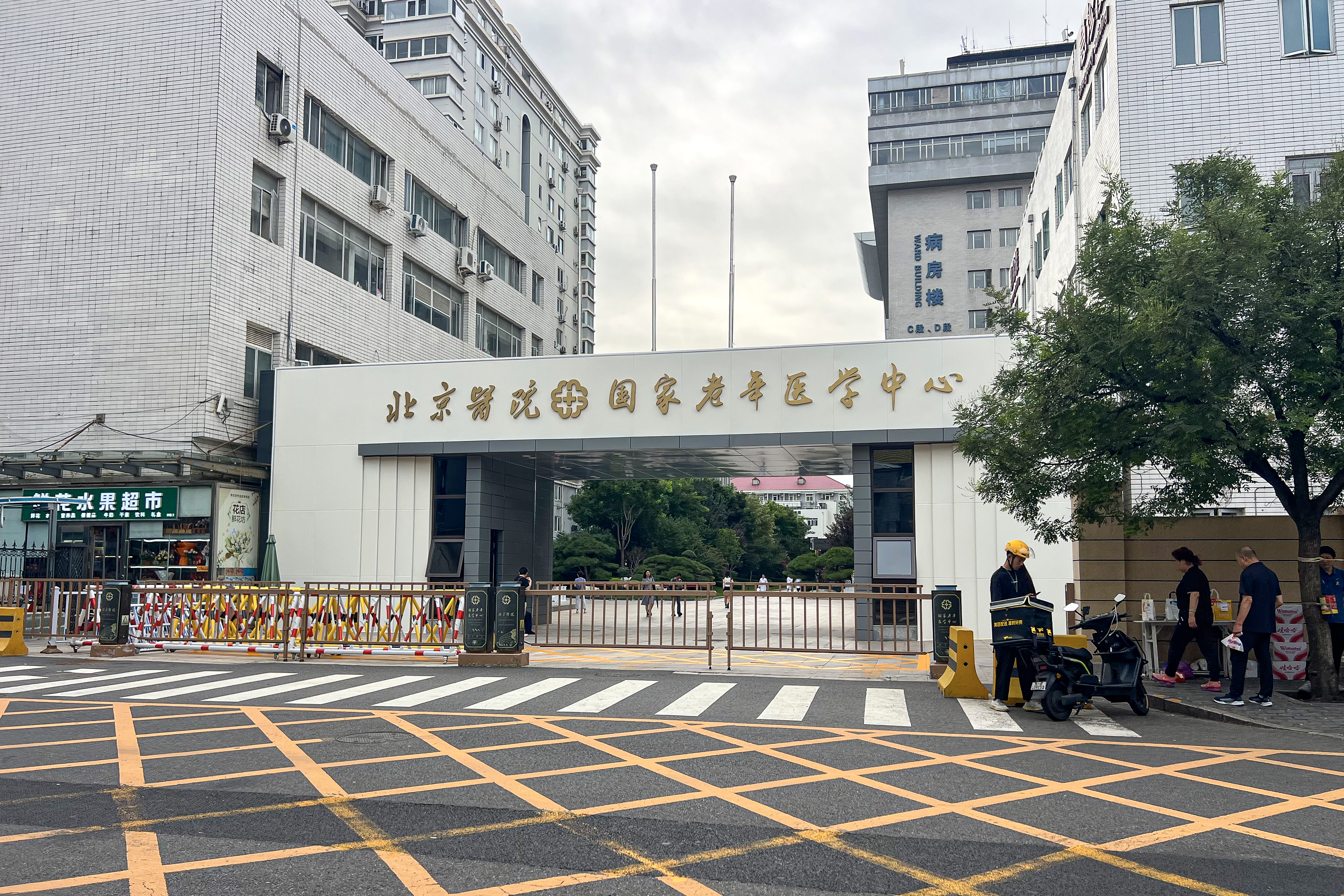

Geography
- Location: Dongdan, Dongcheng District, Beijing, China

Organisation
- Type: General, teaching

Services
- Standards: 3A
- Emergency department: Yes
- Beds: 1,247

History
- Founded: September 25, 1905

Links
- Website: bjhmoh.cn
- Lists: Hospitals in China

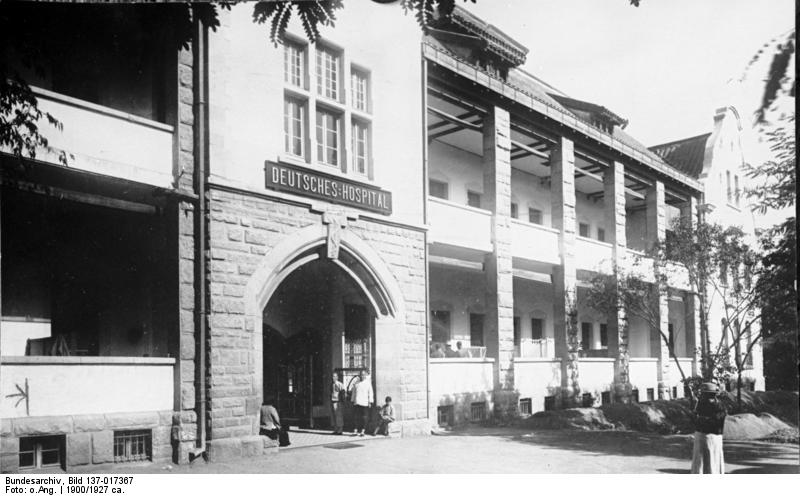
Old photo of a German hospital (around 1927)

Beijing Hospital (simplified Chinese: 北京医院; traditional Chinese: 北京醫院; pinyin: Běijīng Yīyuàn) is a large-scale Class-A tertiary hospital directly under the National Health Commission of the People's Republic of China. Founded in 1905 as a German military hospital, it is now a modern comprehensive hospital open to the public. Beijing Hospital is also a senior cadre health care base of the central government, and has long experience in gerontological research, training and care. The hospital is located at No. 1, Dahua Road, Dongdan, Dongcheng District, Beijing.

== History ==
=== German Army Hospital ===
The history of Beijing Hospital can be traced back to the German Army Hospital built in Beiping by the German government with the Boxer Indemnity in 1905. From the initial construction of the German hospital to before 1945, dozens of German doctors and nurses worked in the hospital.

In 1917, German doctor Edmund Dibor was commissioned by the German Church in Beiping to convert the military hospital into a civilian hospital, namely the "German Hospital", which was co-managed by the Christian Evangelical Convent with its headquarters in Stuttgart, Germany.

After the Japanese surrender in 1945, on October 15, the Beiping Municipal Health Bureau appointed Dr. Wu Jie as the first director to take over the hospital. On November 2 of the same year, the hospital was renamed "Municipal Beiping Hospital". By February 1949, the hospital had 256 employees and a building area of 14,000 square meters.

=== Yan'an Central Hospital ===
The other predecessor of Beijing Hospital was the Central Hospital in Yan'an. In 1939, the Central Committee of the Chinese Communist Party entrusted He Mu to build the Central Hospital. The opening ceremony was held on November 7, 1939. Since 1940, the Central Hospital was also called the First Department of the Bethune International Peace Hospital.

In early 1947, the hospital moved to the North China Liberated Area and became the "First Rear Area Hospital", which was later changed into the Central Outpatient Department, and moved to Beiping in March 1949.

=== After 1949 ===
On April 25, 1949, the Ministry of Health of the Central Military Commission of the Chinese Communist Party (CCP) led medical staff from the Yan'an Central Hospital and the Bethune International Peace Hospital to take over the Beiping Hospital. In September 1949, the First Plenary Session of the Chinese People's Political Consultative Conference decided to make Beiping the capital and renamed "Beiping" as "Beijing", and the Beiping Hospital was renamed "Beijing Hospital". In February 1950, Mao Zedong wrote the new Chinese name “北京醫院” in cursive script for the hospital.

In April 1953, the leadership of the Beijing Hospital was changed from the Ministry of Health of the Military Commission to the Ministry of Health of the Central People's Government. The hospital's mission became clearer: to be responsible for the health care of central leaders. In December 1958, the hospital was once transferred to the leadership of the Chinese Academy of Medical Sciences, and in April 1960 it was returned to the leadership of the Ministry of Health. By 1962, the hospital had 666 employees. At the same time, the General Hospital of the People's Liberation Army, the General Hospital of the People's Liberation Army Navy, the Zhongnanhai Health Group and the Mongolian People's Republic all sent nurses to study and train here.

On August 10, 1964, Mao Zedong criticized that "Beijing Hospital has many doctors but few patients. It is a "boss hospital" and should be opened." On October 15, 1964, the second outpatient department was built and opened to the public. As a result, the number of outpatient and emergency patients increased sharply. In 1963, the total number of outpatient and emergency patients was 115,992, which rose to 201,225 in 1965 and soared to 284,997 in 1966. In order to meet the medical needs of the masses, a 3,200-square-meter surgical building was built in 1965 and completed in 1966. On August 31, 1965, the first and second outpatient departments were merged and completely opened to the public, and the number of medical contracts increased to more than 50,000.

After the outbreak of the Cultural Revolution in 1966, like the cases of many other hospitals in Beijing, Beijing Hospital leading cadres were labeled "monsters and demons", experts and professors were labeled "reactionary academic authorities", health doctors and nurses were also implicated, and some were even wrongly imprisoned. In November 1969, a total of 277 people were sent to the May 7th Cadre School, accounting for 33.9% of the total number of employees in the hospital at that time. On March 22, 1967, the State Council and the Central Military Commission imposed military control on the hospital, which lasted until 1974.

On January 8, 1976, Zhou Enlai died. On January 10 and 11, a farewell ceremony for Zhou Enlai's body was held in the hospital. More than 10,000 people from all walks of life came to bid farewell. In July of the same year, Chairman Zhu De died in the hospital. On July 8, a farewell ceremony for his body was held in the hospital.

In 1978, the Party Committee of the hospital proposed that the research focus of Beijing Hospital should be geriatric medicine. In 1981, the Chinese Medical Association Geriatrics Society was established, and the deputy director was Tao Huanle, the director of the hospital's internal medicine department. With the approval of the Ministry of Health, the Chinese Journal of Geriatrics was founded in 1982, with its editorial office located in Beijing Hospital.

In 1982, the Ministry of Health Clinical Laboratory Center was established and entrusted to the hospital by the Ministry of Health. The center is mainly responsible for the quality control of clinical laboratories nationwide.

In 1985, the hospital enrolled 8 graduate students for the first time, and continuously selected talents to study advanced technology at home and abroad. A total of 14 classes of Zhongshan Night School were opened to improve the quality of employees.

In 1993, Beijing Hospital passed the "Grade 3A" inspection and became a 3A hospital.

In 1994, the total number of outpatient and emergency department visits of the hospital exceeded 700,000, with an average of 2,477 outpatient visits per day, setting a historical record. The total financial income reached 146 million yuan, also setting a historical record.

In March 2015, the National Center for Gerontology was established at Beijing Hospital, integrating scientific research, clinical care, rehabilitation services, public health policies and health management. On May 18, the Beijing Hospital of the Ministry of Health was officially renamed "Beijing Hospital".

In February 2019, Beijing Hospital established the Institute of Geriatrics of the Chinese Academy of Medical Sciences. On July 19, the hospital and the University of Chinese Academy of Sciences jointly established the Beijing School of Clinical Medicine of the University of Chinese Academy of Sciences.

== Notable deaths in Beijing Hospital ==
- 1920: Yang Changji (educator, Mao Zedong's teacher and father-in-law)
- 1939: Qian Xuantong (literary writer)
- 1948: Zhu Ziqing (literary writer)
- 1953: Xu Beihong (painter)
- 1955: Zhang Lan (Chairman of the China Democratic League)
- 1957: Qi Baishi (painter)
- 1963: Luo Ronghuan (Marshal of the People's Republic of China)
- 1972: Deng Zihui (former Vice Premier of the State Council)
- 1974: Fu Zuoyi (Vice Chairman of the Fourth National Committee of the Chinese People's Political Consultative Conference, Minister of Water Resources)
- 1976:
  - Zhou Enlai (former Premier of the State Council, former chairman of the National Committee of the Chinese People's Political Consultative Conference),
  - Zhu De (Chairman of the Standing Committee of the National People's Congress, the first Marshal of the People's Republic of China)
- 1978: Guo Moruo (literary scholar, politician)
- 1986: Chen Yonggui (former Vice Premier of the State Council)
- 1988: Jiang Nanxiang (Marxist educator, Minister of Higher Education)
- 1989: Hu Yaobang (former General Secretary of the Chinese Communist Party)
- 1992: Deng Yingchao (former Chairman of the National Committee of the Chinese People's Political Consultative Conference, wife of the first Chinese Premier, Zhou Enlai)
- 1993: Zhou Peiyuan (fluid mechanic)
- 1995:
  - Xia Yan (playwright),
  - Chen Yun (former Vice Chairman of the Central Committee of the Chinese Communist Party)
- 1996:
  - Cao Yu (founder of modern Chinese drama),
  - Chen Jingrun (mathematician)
- 1997: Peng Zhen (Chairman of the Standing Committee of the Sixth National People's Congress)
- 1999: Bing Xin (writer)
- 2005: Zhao Ziyang (former General Secretary of the Central Committee of the CCP, Premier of the State Council, Vice Chairman of the Central Military Commission)
- 2007: Fu Tieshan (Vice Chairman of the 10th National People's Congress Standing Committee, Chairman of the Chinese Catholic Patriotic Association, Bishop of the Catholic Diocese of Beijing)
- 2008: Wu Xueqian (Former Vice Premier of the State Council, former Minister of Foreign Affairs)
- 2011: Liu Huaqing (Former Member of the Standing Committee of the Political Bureau of the CCP Central Committee, former Vice Chairman of the Central Military Commission)
- 2012: Norodom Sihanouk (King Tai of Cambodia)
- 2015:
  - Qiao Shi (Former Member of the Standing Committee of the Political Bureau of the CCP Central Committee, former Secretary of the Central Commission for Discipline Inspection, Chairman of the 8th National People's Congress Standing Committee),
  - Wan Li (Former Member of the Political Bureau of the CCP Central Committee, Chairman of the 7th National People's Congress Standing Committee),
  - Wei Jianxing (Former Member of the Standing Committee of the Political Bureau of the CCP Central Committee, former Secretary of the Central Commission for Discipline Inspection),
  - Deng Liqun (former Secretary of the Secretariat of the CCP Central Committee and former Minister of the Propaganda Department of the CCP Central Committee)
  - Zhang Jingfu (former State Councilor, former member of the Standing Committee of the CCP Central Advisory Commission),
  - Wang Dongxing (former Vice Chairman of the CCP Central Committee),
  - Zhang Zhen (former Vice Chairman of the Central Military Commission),
  - Zhang Wannian (former Vice Chairman of the Central Military Commission),
  - Cheng Siwei (former Vice Chairman of the Standing Committee of the National People's Congress, former chairman of the China Democratic National Construction Association),
  - Lu Ping (former Director of the Hong Kong and Macao Affairs Office of the State Council)
- 2017: Qian Qichen (former Vice Premier of the State Council, former Minister of Foreign Affairs)
- 2018:
  - Yuan Mu (former State Council Spokesperson, Director of Li Peng's Office),
  - Wang Guangying (former Vice Chairman of the Standing Committee of the National People's Congress)
- 2019: Li Rui (former member of the Central Advisory Commission, former Deputy Minister of the Organization Department of the CCP Central Committee)

== Rankings ==
According to the "China Hospital Specialty Reputation Rankings" released by the Hospital Management Institute of Fudan University, Beijing Hospital ranks

- China Hospital Specialty Reputation Ranking - Geriatrics (year 2023) : No. 1
- China Hospital Comprehensive Ranking (year 2023): A+

== See also ==
- 301 Hospital
- Central Health Commission
