= Shi Yinhong =

Chinese political scientist

- 时殷弘
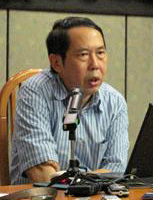
- Shi in 2010
- Born: March 1951 (age 75); Changzhou, Jiangsu, China

Academic background
- Education: Nanjing University (BA, MA, PhD)
- Doctoral advisor: Wang Shengzu

Academic work
- Institutions: Renmin University of China

Shi Yinhong (born March 1951) is a Chinese political scientist and international relations scholar. He is a distinguished professor of international relations, chairman of the Academic Committee of the School of International Studies, and director of the Centre on American Studies at the Renmin University of China. He has served as a counsellor at the Counsellors' Office of the State Council of China since February 2011.

== Academic career ==
Shi received a bachelor's degree in history in 1979, a master's degree in the United States diplomatic history in 1981, and a doctorate in history of international relations in 1988, all from Nanjing University.

He was a visiting fellow at Harvard-Yenching Institute at Harvard University (1983-1984), Federal Institute for Eastern European and International Studies in Cologne (1992), and University of North Carolina at Chapel Hill (1995-1996).

He was a Professor of International History at Nanjing University (1993-1998) and a Professor of IR and Director of the Center for International Strategic Studies at International Relations Academy, Nanjing (1998-2001).
