= Mao Shoulong =

Mao Shoulong (Chinese: 毛寿龙; pinyin: Máo Shòulóng) is a famous Chinese scholar of public administration, a professor at Renmin University of China.

== Biography ==
Mao Shoulong received his B.A, Master, and Ph.D degrees from Beijing University in 1988, 1992 and 1994. After graduation, he joined the faculty of the Department of Public Administration, Renmin University of China and was the Head of the Department. Now he is executive dean of Academe of Public Policy, Rennmin University of China based in Beijing.

From 2000 to 2001 Mao was a post-doctoral researcher at Indiana University.
