= Yuan Baohua =

Chinese academic

- 袁宝华

Director of the State Economic Commission
- In office 1981–1982
- Preceded by: Kang Shi'en
- Succeeded by: Zhang Jingfu

President of Renmin University of China
- In office 1985–1991
- Preceded by: Guo Yingqiu
- Succeeded by: Huang Da

Personal details
- Born: 13 January 1916 Nanzhao County, Henan, China
- Died: 9 May 2019 (aged 103) Beijing, China
- Party: Chinese Communist Party
- Education: Peking University

Chinese name
- Traditional Chinese: 袁寶華
- Simplified Chinese: 袁宝华
Transcriptions
Standard Mandarin
- Hanyu Pinyin: Yuán Bǎohuá
- Wade–Giles: Yüan Pao-hua
- IPA: [ɥɛ̌n pàʊxwǎ]

Yuan Baohua (Chinese: 袁宝华; 13 January 1916 – 9 May 2019) was a Chinese economic official and academic administrator. He served as Vice Minister of the Ministry of Metallurgy Industry, Minister of the Ministry of Materials, Executive Vice Director of the State Planning Commission, and Director of the State Economic Commission. From 1985 to 1991, he served as President of Renmin University of China. He was a mentor of Zhu Rongji, the former Premier of China.

== Republic of China ==
Yuan was born on 13 January 1916 in Nanzhao County, Henan, Republic of China. He entered Peking University in 1934 to study mathematics, later transferring to geology. In 1935, he participated in the December 9th student protests against Japanese aggression in North China. He joined the Communist Youth League in April 1936, and the Chinese Communist Party (CCP) in September.

When Japan launched a full-scale invasion of China in 1937, Yuan returned to his hometown to organize anti-Japanese resistance. In 1940, he moved to the CCP headquarters at Yan'an to study at the CCP Central Party School. The next year, he was assigned to the Organization Department of the CCP Central Committee.

After the surrender of Japan in 1945, Yuan was transferred to the formerly Japanese-occupied Northeast China, where he served as party secretary of Tao'an County and later youth secretary of Nenjiang Province.

== People's Republic of China ==
After the founding of the People's Republic of China in 1949, Yuan served as Secretary of the Ministry of Industry of Northeast China and Director of the ministry's Planning Department. In 1951, Zhu Rongji, then a new university graduate, was assigned to work in Yuan's department. Zhu, who eventually rose to become Premier of China, later called Yuan his best mentor.

Yuan was later transferred to the central government in Beijing to serve as a bureau chief in the Ministry of Heavy Industry. He was promoted to Vice Minister of the Ministry of Metallurgy Industry, Minister of the Ministry of Materials, Executive Vice Director of the State Planning Commission, and Director of the State Economic Commission.

He was elected an alternate member of the 11th Central Committee of the Chinese Communist Party and a full member of the 12th Central Committee. At the 13th National Congress of the Chinese Communist Party in 1987, he was elected a member of the Second Central Advisory Commission.

From June 1985 to December 1991, Yuan served as President of Renmin University of China. During his tenure, he established the economic management and administrative management programs at the university. He advocated for and led the establishment of Chinese Academy of Governance for professional training of government officials. He also advocated for the establishment of MBA programs in Chinese universities.

Yuan wrote many books and articles in a career spanning five decades. In May 2015, his writings were published in the 10-volume Collected Works of Yuan Baohua (袁宝华文集). Zhu Rongji wrote the preface for the collection and came out of his retirement to promote its publication.

On 9 May 2019, Yuan died in Beijing at the age of 103.

Government offices
Preceded by Kang Shi'en	Director of the State Economic Commission; 1981–1982	Succeeded by Zhang Jingfu
Academic offices
Preceded by Guo Yingqiu	President of Renmin University of China; 1985–1991	Succeeded by Huang Da
