= Wang Liming (legal scholar) =

Chinese legal academic

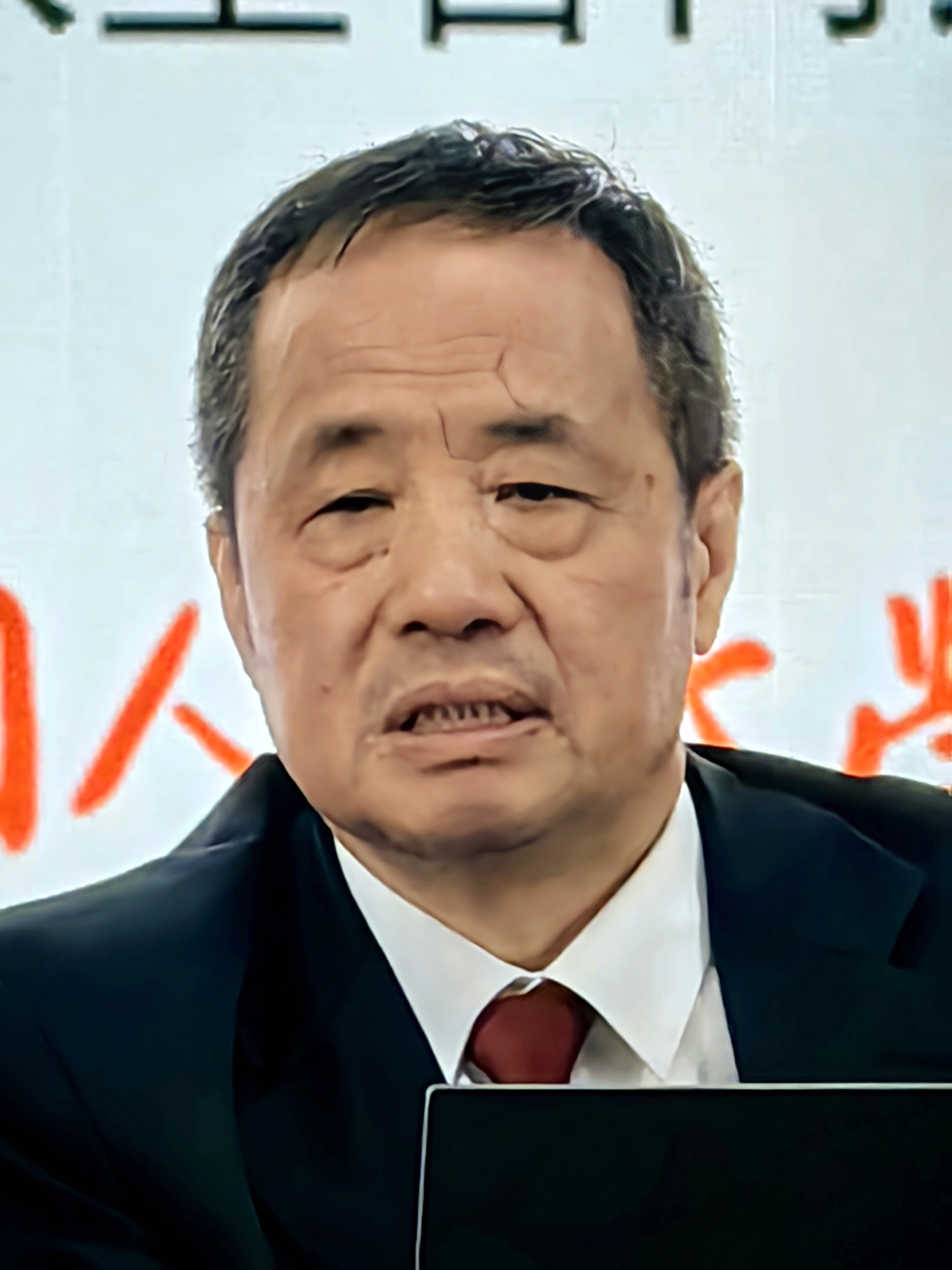
- Wang Liming (2024年)
- Born: Xiantao, Hubei Province
- Education: Renmin University of China
- Occupation: Jurist

Wang Liming (Chinese: 王利明; pinyin: Wáng Lìmíng; born 1960) is the Vice President of Renmin University of China and one of the foremost scholars of civil law in China.

== Biography ==
Wang was born in Xiantao, Hubei Province, China. He received his LL.B. degree from Hubei Institute of Finance and Economics (now known as Zhongnan University of Economics and Law) in 1981, and LL.M from Renmin University of China Department of Law in 1984.

After graduation, Wang joined the faculty of Renmin University Law School. He received his LL.D degree from the same university in 1990.

In 1995, Wang Liming was selected as one of the "Ten Outstanding Young Jurists" by the China Law Society.

Wang was a visiting scholar at Harvard Law School from 1999 to 2000 and Yale Law School in 2004.

Wang was the Dean of Renmin University Law School from 2005 to 2009.

Academic offices
| Preceded by Zeng Xianyi | Dean of Renmin University of China Law School; 2005 – 2009 | Succeeded by Han Dayuan |
