= Wang Chen (physician) =

Chinese pulmonologist

- 王辰

Vice-President of the Chinese Academy of Engineering
- In office May 2018 – September 2025
- President: Li Xiaohong

Member of the Standing Committee of the CPPCC (13th)
- Incumbent
- Assumed office March 2018
- Chairman: Wang Yang

President of the Peking Union Medical College
- In office December 2017 – August 2025
- Preceded by: Cao Xuetao
- Succeeded by: Ji Xunming

Personal details
- Born: August 7, 1962 (age 64) Dezhou, Shandong, China
- Party: Chinese Communist Party
- Education: Capital University of Medical Sciences; University of Texas
- Occupation: Pulmonologist, physician
- Scientific career
- Fields: Pulmonology
- Workplaces: Peking Union Medical College; Chinese Academy of Engineering (CAE)

Wang Chen (Chinese: 王辰; pinyin: Wáng Chén; born August 7, 1962) is a Chinese pulmonologist and physician, formerly served as vice-president of the Chinese Academy of Engineering (CAE) and president of the Peking Union Medical College. He is a member of the Chinese Hospital Association (CHA) and Chinese Medical Doctor Association (CMDA).

== Biography ==
Wang was born in Dezhou, Shandong, on August 7, 1962. He graduated from the Capital University of Medical Sciences, where he received his bachelor's degree in 1985 and doctor's degree in 1991, both in medicine. He carried out postdoctoral research at the University of Texas in 1994.

He worked at the Beijing Chaoyang Hospital between 1993 and 2013, where he successively was deputy director, vice-president, and president. From January 2013 to September 2014, he had a brief assignment to the Ministry of Health. In September 2014 he was appointed president of the China-Japan Friendship Hospital. After this office was terminated in January 2018, he became president of Peking Union Medical College. He has been vice-president of the Chinese Academy of Engineering (CAE) in May 2018.

On February 5, 2020, Wang was interviewed by Bai Yansong on China's national TV and said that the situation in Wuhan was grim, and many patients were not admitted to the hospital in time, which is a great pressure; he was one of early and high-profile advocates of Fangcang Hospitals for COVID-19 patients in China.

He is a delegate to the 19th National Congress of the Chinese Communist Party and a member of the 13th Standing Committee of the Chinese People's Political Consultative Conference.

== Contributions ==
During the 2003 Beijing SARS outbreak and the 2009 flu pandemic, he was appointed head of the National Clinical Expert Group, formulating a series of diagnosis and treatment procedures to treat large numbers of patients.

== Honours and awards ==
- November 2013 Member of the Chinese Academy of Engineering (CAE)
- December 1, 2019 Wu Jieping Medical Prize
- October 19, 2020 Foreign associate of the National Academy of Medicine (NAM)

Educational offices
Preceded by Cao Xuetao	President of the Peking Union Medical College; 2017-present	Succeeded by Ji Xunming
