= Zhang Kangzhi =

Chinese academic

Zhang Kangzhi (张康之 , born 12 August 1957 in Tongshan, Jiangsu province) is one of the two Changjiang Scholars in the discipline of Public Administration, a professor and a tutor of a PhD in the Department of Public Administration of Renmin University of China (RUC), an adjunct professor of the Center for Public Administration Research of Sun Yat-Sen University, a standing director of the fifth council of the Chinese Public Administration Society, and guest professor, chair professor, and adjunct professor of many other universities.

== Career ==
He had been studied in the Department of Philosophy of Nanjing University, School of Marxism Studies of RUC, Department of Philosophy of RUC, and taught in the Department of Theory of Northwest College of Politics and Law, School of Marxism Studies of RUC, and the Department of Public Administration of RUC. He got a Doctor degree of Philosophy in RUC in 1995, with the doctoral dissertation winning the first National Excellent Doctoral Dissertation Award. He had been studied in the fields of Western Marxism and Administrative Ethics, and has focused on Administrative Philosophy and Administrative Culture and organization theory recently. He is the major draftsman of the "proposal for creating China's MPA education" and its preliminary scheme, both submitted to the State Education Commission by RUC in 1996. He has published more than 400 pieces of papers in journals like Social Science in China, Journal of Renmin University of China, Administrative Tribune, Academic Research and so on. He has published more than ten books, composed or edited three pieces of teaching materials, some of the works has assured him some awards like Wu Yuzhang Award, Five Ones Program Award of the Publicity Department of the Chinese Communist Party, the Excellent Books Award in east china district, and many times of the Award for outstanding achievements in scientific research of the RUC.

He is considered one of the most originative scholars in China, and is specially influential in the fields of "the debate in paradigms of Public Management", "publicity" and "public interest". He is the creator of the concept "服务型政府" (Service-oriented government) in China, which has an evident effect on Chinese government's "Building the Service-oriented government" movement. His "In Search of a Ethical Perspective of Public Administration" stirred the Chinese academia in Public Administration, and was considered "open up a new perspective for the research of Public Administration, is very important for the further development of Chinese Public Administration", and "is bound to be one of the classic works in Public Administration in the future."

== Publications ==
=== Books ===
- Totality and Utopia: the Category of Totality of Humanistic Marxism, China Renmin University Press, 1998/2007 (JiLin Publishing Group)
- In Search of an Ethical Perspective of Public Administration, China Renmin University Press, 2002
- Public Managemental Ethics, China Renmin University Press, 2003
- Philosophy and Ethic in Public Administration, China Renmin University Press, 2004
- The Historical Narration of Social Governance, China Renmin University Press, 2005
- Concepts and Horizens of Administrative Ethics, China Renmin University Press, 2008

=== Textbooks ===
- Zhang Kangzhi, Zhang Zhang and Li Chuanjun, Public Administration, Economic Science Press, 2002
- Zhang Kangzhi, etc., Introduction of Public Management, Economic Science Press, 2003
- Zhang Kangzhi and Li Chuanjun, Course of Administrative Ethics, China Renmin University Press, 2004/2009
- Zhang Kangzhi and Li Chuanjun, Administrative Ethics, Central Radio & TV University Press, 2004
- Zhang Kangzhi and Li Chuanjun, General Principles of Management, China Renmin University Press, 2005
- Zhang Kangzhi and Li Chuanjun, Public Administration, PeKing University Press, 2007
