= Gong Yuzhi =

- 龚育之

Executive Deputy Head of the Party Documents Research Office of the CPC Central Committee
- In office June 1995 – March 1999
- Head: Hu Sheng

Vice President of the Central Party School of the Chinese Communist Party
- In office March 1994 – March 1999
- President: Hu Jintao

Deputy Head of the Publicity Department of the Chinese Communist Party
- In office September 1991 – March 1994
- Head: Wang Renzhi; Ding Guangen

Personal details
- Born: 26 December 1929 Xiangtan, Hunan, China
- Died: June 12, 2007 (aged 77) Beijing, China
- Party: Chinese Communist Party
- Spouse: Sun Xiaoli
- Children: Gong Ke
- Parent: Gong Yinbing
- Education: Tsinghua University

Chinese name
- Simplified Chinese: 龚育之
- Traditional Chinese: 龔育之
Transcriptions
Standard Mandarin
- Hanyu Pinyin: Gōng Yùzhī

Gong Yuzhi (Chinese: 龚育之; 26 December 1929 – 12 June 2007) was a Chinese Communist Party theorist and politician. He was a representative of the 15th National Congress of the Chinese Communist Party. He was a member of the 5th, 6th, 7th, and 8th National Committee of the Chinese People's Political Consultative Conference and a member of the 9th Standing Committee of the Chinese People's Political Consultative Conference.

== Biography ==
Gong was born in Xiangtan, Hunan, on 26 December 1929, while his ancestral home in Changsha County. His father Gong Yinbing was a communist revolutionary and politician. In September 1948, he was admitted to Tsinghua University, majoring in chemistry. He joined the Chinese Communist Party (CCP) in December 1948.

Gong worked in the Publicity Department of the Chinese Communist Party after university. In 1966, Mao Zedong launched the Cultural Revolution, he was sent to the May Seventh Cadre School to do farm works in Helan County, northwest China's Ningxia Hui Autonomous Region. He was reinstated in October 1973 and worked at the Science and Education Group of the State Council and Ministry of Education. In early 1977, he and Zheng Bijian jointly drafted an editorial entitled "Learning Documents Well and Grasping the Outline" (学好文件抓好纲), which officially put forward the "Two Whatevers". In January 1980, he served as deputy director of the Office of Chairman Mao Zedong's Works Editorial Committee of the CCP Central Committee and deputy head of the Party Documents Research Office of the CCP Central Committee. In March 1988, he was appointed deputy head of the Publicity Department of the CCP, responsible for theoretical work. In March 1994, he became vice president of the Central Party School of the Chinese Communist Party, concurrently serving as executive deputy head of the Party Documents Research Office of the CCP Central Committee since June 1995.

On 12 June 2007, he died from an illness in Beijing, aged 77.
