= Ji Baocheng =

Chinese educator

Ji Baocheng (Chinese: 纪宝成; pinyin: Jì Bǎochéng; born November 1944) is the former President of Renmin University of China.

== Biography ==
Ji was born in Yangzhou, Jiangsu in 1944. He attended the Beijing Institute of Business from 1962 to 1966. After ten years as a worker in Hubei province, he returned to Renmin University of China in 1978 as graduate student, teacher, and dean.

He moved to the Ministry of Commerce in 1991 and to the Higher Education Division of the State Education Committee in 1996. He was the president of Renmin University of China from 2000 to 2011.

Ji was chief editor of several books on marketing, trading and management, the most recent being "A Comparative Study of International Business Education" in 1998.

Educational offices
Preceded by Li Wenhai	President of Renmin University of China; 2000–2011	Succeeded by Chen Yulu
