= Cao Xuetao =

Chinese immunologist

- 曹雪涛

President of Nankai University
- In office January 2018 – August 2022
- Preceded by: Gong Ke
- Succeeded by: Chen Yulu

President of Peking Union Medical College
- In office 2015–2017
- Preceded by: Zeng Yixin
- Succeeded by: Wang Chen

Personal details
- Born: July 19, 1964 (age 62) Jinan, Shandong, China
- Party: Chinese Communist Party
- Education: Second Military Medical University
- Scientific career
- Fields: Immunology
- Workplaces: Nankai University
- Academic advisors: Ye Tianxing

Chinese name
- Traditional Chinese: 曹雪濤
- Simplified Chinese: 曹雪涛
Transcriptions
Standard Mandarin
- Hanyu Pinyin: Cáo Xuětāo

Cao Xuetao (Chinese: 曹雪涛; born July 19, 1964) is a Chinese immunologist who formerly served as president of Nankai University from 2018 to 2022.

== Biography ==
Cao was born in Jinan, Shandong, China on July 19, 1964. In September 1981 he was accepted to the Second Military Medical University in Shanghai, where he received his doctorate in medicine in 1986 and completed his post-graduate studies in immunology in 1990. After graduation, he was a lecturer and then professor (1993) at the Second Military Medical University, as one of the youngest medical professors at that time. He also served as chairman of the Department (1995–2011), Director of the Institute of Immunology (2000–2011) and Vice President of the university (2004–2011). In July 2005 he was awarded the military rank of major general (shao jiang).

He was president of the Chinese Academy of Medical Sciences between August 2011 and November 2015. In August 2010 he became vice president of Peking Union Medical College, rising to president in November 2015. In January 2018 he was appointed president of Nankai University, a vice-ministerial level position. He also served as president of the Chinese Society of Immunology (2006–2014), the Federation of Immunological Societies of Asia-Oceania (2012–2015) and the Global Alliance for Chronic Diseases (2014–2015).

In January 2018 he became a member of the 13th National Committee of the Chinese People's Political Consultative Conference.

== Honors and awards ==
- State Science and Technology Progress Award (Third Class)
- 2005 Member of the Chinese Academy of Engineering (CAE)
- 2013 Member of the German Academy of Sciences Leopoldina
- 2014 Foreign Associate Member of the Académie Nationale de Médecine of France
- 2014 Associate Member of the European Molecular Biology Organization
- 2015 Lifetime Achievement Award for Mentoring in Science by Nature
- 2016 Member of the British Academy of Medical Sciences
- October 16, 2017 International Member of the US National Academy of Medicine
- April 18, 2018 Foreign Honorary Member of the American Academy of Arts and Sciences (AAAS)

== Investigation ==
On November 13, 2019, American biologist Elisabeth Bik wrote on PubPeer that about 40 papers co-authored by Cao used unexpectedly similar images, a sign of possible manipulation, although Bik said many of these could be honest errors. So far, no results have been announced, and netizens noticed a public smear campaign on American scientists from Harvard. On November 18, the Chinese Academy of Engineering (CAE) announced that it is investigating the claim. The June 26, 2020 issue of the Journal of Biological Chemistry announced "expressions of concern" on 12 articles on which Cao was corresponding author.

== Personal life ==
Cao is married and has a son, who received his doctoral degree at Harvard and is now in Xie Xiaoliang laboratory at Peking University.

== Selected papers ==
- Zhang, Minghui; Tang, Hua; Guo, Zhenhong; An, Huazhang; Zhu, Xuejun; Song, Wengang; Guo, Jun; Huang, Xin; Chen, Taoyong; Wang, Jianli; Cao, Xuetao (2004). "Splenic stroma drives mature dendritic cells to differentiate into regulatory dendritic cells". Nature Immunology. 5 (11): 1124–1133. doi:10.1038/ni1130. PMID 15475957. S2CID 11900161.
- Wang, P.; Xue, Y.; Han, Y.; Lin, L.; Wu, C.; Xu, S.; Jiang, Z.; Xu, J.; Liu, Q.; Cao, X. (2014). "The STAT3-Binding Long Noncoding RNA lnc-DC Controls Human Dendritic Cell Differentiation". Science. 344 (6181): 310–313. Bibcode:2014Sci...344..310W. doi:10.1126/science.1251456. PMID 24744378. S2CID 206555531.
- Hou, Jin; Wang, Pin; Lin, Li; Liu, Xingguang; Ma, Feng; An, Huazhang; Wang, Zhugang; Cao, Xuetao (2009). "MicroRNA-146a Feedback Inhibits RIG-I-Dependent Type I IFN Production in Macrophages by Targeting TRAF6, IRAK1, and IRAK2". Journal of Immunology. 183 (3): 2150–2158. doi:10.4049/jimmunol.0900707. PMID 19596990.
- Hou, Jin; Lin, Li; Zhou, Weiping; Wang, Zhengxin; Ding, Guoshan; Dong, Qiongzhu; Qin, Lunxiu; Wu, Xiaobing; Zheng, Yuanyuan; Yang, Yun; Tian, Wei; Zhang, Qian; Wang, Chunmei; Zhang, Qinghua; Zhuang, Shi-Mei; Zheng, Limin; Liang, Anmin; Tao, Wenzhao; Cao, Xuetao (2011). "Identification of miRNomes in Human Liver and Hepatocellular Carcinoma Reveals miR-199a/b-3p as Therapeutic Target for Hepatocellular Carcinoma". Cancer Cell. 19 (2): 232–243. doi:10.1016/j.ccr.2011.01.001. PMID 21316602.

Educational offices
Preceded by Zeng Yixin	President of Peking Union Medical College; 2015–2017	Succeeded by Wang Chen
Preceded by Gong Ke	President of Nankai University; 2018–present	Incumbent
