= Han Dayuan =

Han Dayuan (Chinese: 韓大元; pinyin: Hán Dàyuán, born October 1960) is Professor of Constitutional Law and the Dean of Renmin University of China Law School. He is also the President of the Chinese Constitutional Law Society.

== Biography ==
Han Dayuan was born in a Korean family in Jilin, China. He received his LL.B degree from Jilin University in 1984, and his LL.M degree from Renmin University of China Law School in 1987, after which he joined the faculty of Renmin University Law School. In 1994 he received his LL.D from Renmin University. From 1990 to 1991, he was visiting scholar at Kyoto University. In 2001, he was visiting scholar at Harvard Law School.

Han was selected to be one of the Ten Outstanding Young Jurists by China Law Society in 1999. In 2005, he was elected as one of Distinguished Contemporary Chinese Jurists.

In October 2007, he was elected President of the Chinese Constitutional Law Society. Han was appointed Dean of Renmin University of China Law School in April 2009.

== Views ==
In February 2012, Han suggested in an article published in The Legal Daily, that China's Draft Criminal Procedure Law (CPL) Amendments be further amended to substitute the words, "to punish crime [and] to protect the people" to "...to protect human rights."

In November 2017, Han published an article in Law Science defending the fixed-term system for leading cadres established under the 1982 Constitution. He argued that constitutional amendments to term lengths or term limits should not apply to incumbent state leaders, quoting General Secretary Xi's statement that democratic institutions "must be institutionalized and codified into law" so they do not change with changes in leadership or individual leaders' views.

In February 2021, Han said that the 2019–2020 Hong Kong protests happened because the government failed to ensure that only "patriots" ran the city. Regarding "patriots," Han also claimed that "elections... must ensure patriots are elected into governance, must ensure the HKSAR regime's security, to prevent significant risks to national security."

Academic offices
Preceded by Wang Liming	Dean of Renmin University of China Law School; 2009 – present	Incumbent
