= Zeng Xianyi =

- Born: January 31, 1936
- Died: January 15, 2011 (aged 74); Beijing, China
- Citizenship: Chinese
- Education: Renmin University of China
- Scientific career
- Fields: Legal history
- Workplaces: Renmin University of China Law School

Zeng Xianyi (Chinese: 曾宪义; pinyin: Zēng Xiànyì; January 31, 1936 – January 15, 2011) was a professor of legal history and was the dean of Renmin University of China Law School.

== Biography ==
Zeng Xianyi received his Bachelor of Laws degree from Renmin University of China Department of Law in 1960. He became the head of the department from 1990 to 1994 and then dean of the law school until 2005. He was then given the title of Honorary Dean of the law school.

Zeng died in Beijing on January 15, 2011.

Academic offices
Preceded by none	Dean of Renmin University of China Law School; 1994–2005	Succeeded by Wang Liming
