= Gong Ke =

Chinese education administrator

- 龚克

President of World Federation of Engineering Organizations
- In office 2019–2021
- Preceded by: Marlene Kanga
- Succeeded by: José Vieira

President of Nankai University
- In office January 2011 – January 2018
- Preceded by: Rao Zihe
- Succeeded by: Cao Xuetao

President of Tianjin University
- In office July 2006 – January 2011
- Preceded by: Shan Ping
- Succeeded by: Li Jiajun

Personal details
- Born: June 1955 (age 71) Beijing, China
- Party: Chinese Communist Party
- Relations: Gong Yinbing
- Parent(s): Gong Yuzhi; Sun Xiaoli
- Education: Beijing Institute of Technology; Graz University of Technology; Tsinghua University

Chinese name
- Simplified Chinese: 龚克
- Traditional Chinese: 龔克
Transcriptions
Standard Mandarin
- Hanyu Pinyin: Gōng Kè

Gong Ke (Chinese: 龚克; born June 1955) is a Chinese electronic engineer and administrator who served as president of Tianjin University from 2006 to 2011 and president of Nankai University from 2011 to 2018. He was an alternate of the 18th Central Committee of the Chinese Communist Party. He was a delegate to the 11th and 12th National People's Congress

== Biography ==
Gong was born into an official family in Beijing in June 1955, while his ancestral home in Changsha, Hunan. His grandfather Gong Yinbing was a communist revolutionary and politician. His father Gong Yuzhi was a Chinese Communist Party theorist and politician. His mother Sun Xiaoli is a professor at Peking University. During the Cultural Revolution, he worked at the state owned No. 789 Factory between June 1970 and March 1978. He attended Beijing Institute of Technology (now Beijing Institute of Technology) where he received his bachelor's degree in electronic engineering in 1982. He joined the Chinese Communist Party in November 1981. From February 1982 to February 1983, he attended language training at Guangzhou Institute of Foreign Languages (now Guangdong University of Foreign Studies). In 1983, he enrolled at Graz University of Technology, where he earned his doctor's degree in communication and radio wave in 1987. He returned to China in September 1987 and that same year carried out postdoctoral research at Tsinghua University.

After graduation, he stayed at the university and worked as assistant, professor, deputy director, director, and eventually moved up the ranks to become vice president in March 1999. In July 2006, he was promoted to become president of Tianjin University, a position at vice-ministerial level. He became president of Nankai University in January 2011, and served until January 2018.

In 2015, he opposed calls for university faculty to "comprehensively tidy up, purify, and rectify." Gong contended that such calls evoked "leftist" mistakes of the past like the Anti-Rightist Campaign and the Cultural Revolution.

In August 2017, he was proposed as executive president of the newly founded China New Generation Artificial Intelligence Development Strategy Research Institute, an academic institution studying artificial intelligence under the jurisdiction of Chinese Academy of Engineering. In November 2019, he was chosen as chairman of World Federation of Engineering Organizations, becoming a Chinese chairman for the first time.

== Honours and awards ==
- 2001 Foreign academician of Russian Academy of Astronautics

Educational offices
Preceded by Shan Ping	President of Tianjin University; 2006–2011	Succeeded by Li Jiajun
Preceded by Rao Zihe	President of Nankai University; 2011–2018	Succeeded by Cao Xuetao
