= Chen Yulu =

Chinese economist

- 陈雨露

President of Nankai University
- Incumbent
- Assumed office August 2022
- Preceded by: Cao Xuetao

President of Renmin University of China
- In office November 2011 – October 2015
- Preceded by: Ji Baocheng
- Succeeded by: Liu Wei

President of Beijing Foreign Studies University
- In office March 2010 – November 2011
- Preceded by: Hao Ping
- Succeeded by: Han Zhen

Personal details
- Born: November 1966 (age 59) Gaocheng, Hebei, China
- Party: Chinese Communist Party
- Education: Renmin University (BEc, MEc, DEc)

Chinese name
- Traditional Chinese: 陳雨露
- Simplified Chinese: 陈雨露
Transcriptions
Standard Mandarin
- Hanyu Pinyin: Chen Yǔlù

Chen Yulu (Chinese: 陈雨露; born November 1966) is a Chinese economist, educator, author, and politician who has been president of Nankai University since August 2022. He was vice governor of People's Bank of China from October 2015 to August 2022. He has previously held appointments in the Renmin University of China as the president.

He is a visiting professor at Milton S. Eisenhower Foundation and Columbia University. He is vice-president of All-China Youth Federation (ACYF). He is vice-chairman, deputy secretary-general and executive director of China International Finance Society.

== Early life and education ==
Chen was born in November 1966, in Gaocheng County of Shijiazhuang, Hebei, with his ancestral home in Chenghai County, Guangdong. His great-great-grandfather was a calligrapher, his great-grandfather was an official in the Qing government. His grandfather Chen Xu (陈恕) was an educator who settled down in British Hong Kong after the Chinese Civil War. His uncle Chen Xiaodong (陈晓中) is the former president of Beijing Planetarium, and his another uncle Chen Ju (陈榘) is a professor at Hubei Normal University. After the high school, he joined the PLA Air Force as a soldier. In 1957 when Mao Zedong launched his Anti-Rightist Movement against intellectuals, his father was sent to the May Seventh Cadre Schools to do farm work, in Yangtai Village of Shijiazhuang, capital of Hebei, where he was born.

Chen received a Bachelor of Economics with a major in finance in 1987, a Master of Economics in international finance in 1989, and a Doctor of Economics in finance in 1998, all from the Renmin University of China.

== Career ==
After his graduate studies, he taught at Renmin University between 1989 and 2010, what he was promoted to associate professor in February 1993 and to full Professor in May 1997. He served as Executive Vice-Dean of its Finance College in 1997, and five years later promoted to the Dean position. In May 2005 he was promoted to become its vice-president, he remained in that position until March 2010, when he was transferred to Beijing Foreign Studies University (BFSU) and appointed the president. After a year and half, he was transferred back to Renmin University and served as the president there, a position at vice-ministerial level. In late October 2015, the Organization Department of the Chinese Communist Party appointed him as deputy governor of People's Bank of China, China's central bank. He is also an adviser to the China Finance 40 Forum (CF40). In August 2022, he was appointed president of Nankai University, succeeding Cao Xuetao.

== Selected publications ==
=== Books ===
- 中国农村金融论纲 [Chinese Rural Finance] (in Chinese). Beijing: China Finance Publishing House. 2010. ISBN 9787504955265.
- 金钱统治 [Money Rules] (in Chinese). Nanjing, Jiangsu: Jiangsu Literature and Art Publishing House. 2011. ISBN 9787539931432.
- 中国金融体系大趋势 [Trend of China's Financial System] (in Chinese). Beijing: China Finance Publishing House. 2011. ISBN 9787504961204.
- 中国是部金融史 [China is the History of Finance] (in Chinese). Beijing: Beijing Lianhe Publishing House. 2013. ISBN 9787550212527.
- 抢钱的世界：全球货币通史1-2 [Other People's Money: Global Monetary History] (in Chinese). Guangzhou, Guangdong: Guangdong Tourism Publishing House. 2013. ISBN 9787807667254.
- 中国是部金融史II：天下之财 [China is the History of Finance: the World of Finance] (in Chinese). Beijing: Jiuzhou Publishing House. 2014. ISBN 9787510826351.
- 大金融与综合增长的世界 [Comprehensive Growth of the World and Large Financial] (in Chinese). Beijing: Chinese Economy Press. 2014. ISBN 9787513635103.
- 国际金融 [International Finance] (in Chinese). Beijing: China Renmin University Press. 2015. ISBN 9787300209890.

=== Academic papers ===
- "Western Hegemony and the Rise of Finance (1-7)" 西方霸权与金融崛起（1-7） [Western Hegemony and the Rise of Finance (1-7)]. Financial View (in Chinese). 5–11. 2009. ISSN 1673-4882.
- "Rise of American Financial Hegemony (1-3)" 美国金融霸权的崛起（1-3） [Rise of American Financial Hegemony (1-3)]. Financial View (in Chinese). 2–4. 2010. ISSN 1673-4882.

Educational offices
Preceded by Hao Ping	President of Beijing Foreign Studies University; 2010–2011	Succeeded by Han Zhen (韩震)
Preceded by Ji Baocheng	President of Renmin University of China; 2011–2015	Succeeded by Liu Wei
Preceded by Cao Xuetao	President of Nankai University; 2022–present	Incumbent
