= Li Wenhai (historian) =

Chinese historian (1932–2013)

Li Wenhai (Chinese: 李文海; pinyin: Lǐ Wénhǎi; February 28, 1932 – June 7, 2013) was a Chinese historian who was the President of Renmin University of China.

== Life and career ==
Li Wenhai was born in Wuxi, Jiangsu, on February 28, 1932. He received his graduate degree from Renmin University in 1955. Li was the President of the University from 1994 to 2000. He died on June 7, 2013, at the age of 81.

Academic offices
| Preceded by Huang Da | President of Renmin University of China; 1994–2000 | Succeeded by Ji Baocheng |
