= Central Health Commission =

Chinese Communist Party body

- 中央保健委员会
- Emblem of the Chinese Communist Party

Agency overview
- Type: Policy coordination and consultation body
- Jurisdiction: Chinese Communist Party
- Headquarters: Beijing
- Agency executives: Cai Qi, Director; Zeng Yixin, Deputy Director; Office Director
- Parent agency: Central Committee of the Chinese Communist Party
- Child agency: Office

Central Health Commission
- Simplified Chinese: 中央保健委员会
Transcriptions
Standard Mandarin
- Hanyu Pinyin: Zhōngyāng Bǎojiàn Wěiyuánhuì

The Central Health Commission is an agency of the Central Committee of the Chinese Communist Party responsible for health management of the Party and state leaders and the central provincial and ministerial level cadres in Beijing. Its office is located in the Health Care Bureau of the National Health Commission and is managed by the General Office of the CCP.

== Functions ==
The Office of the Central Health Commission and the Bureau of Healthcare of the National Health Commission are one institution with two names. The head of the Bureau of Healthcare is concurrently the Director of the Office of the Central Health Commission. The Central Health Commission has a health department in the Central Guard Office in Zhongnanhai, where the leaders of the CCP work.
