= Shi Yan (farmer) =

- Born: 1982 (age 43–44)
- Education: Renmin University
- Occupation: Farmer
- Website: sharedharvest.cn

Shi Yan is a farmer and founder of the first Community Supported Agriculture (CSA) farm in China.

== Career ==
While studying at Beijing's Renmin University, Shi Yan was concerned about the widespread environmental damage being caused by chemical-reliant farming practices. In 2008, she traveled to the United States for six months as an intern at Minnesota's Earthrise Farm to see how Community Support Agriculture (CSA) is implemented in practice.

CSA's consist of a community of individuals who pledge to support a farm, essentially making the farmland community-owned. Growers and consumers provide mutual support and share the risks and benefits of food production. Members typically receive a weekly delivery and collection of boxes of fruit and vegetables, dairy products or meat. CSA's began in the early 1960s in Germany, Switzerland, and Japan in response to concerns about food safety and the urbanization of agricultural land. While food scarcity is no longer a prominent issue in China, many people worry about its safety. A nationwide scandal in 2008 involving toxic contamination of milk powder and tests that found traces of banned pesticides on supermarket vegetables has made many consumers more thoughtful about how their food is produced and where it comes from.

Upon her return to China, Shi Yan founded Little Donkey Farm in 2011, the first CSA in China. The farm had four hundred families who paid an annual membership and another 260 families who rented small plots of land for their own gardens. Shi Yan left Little Donkey Farm after a dispute over the structure of the CSA.

In 2012, Shi Yan founded another CSA, Shared Harvest farm. Shared Harvest is a completely organic farm and was one of the first in China to follow the CSA model. In 2017, Shared Harvest includes three farms plus connections with independent farmers and organic food suppliers. While Shared Harvest does not have organic certification, they do not use any chemical fertilizer and pesticides. As of 2017, 800 families in Beijing are members, and Shared Harvest uses social media to communicate with subscribers about drop-off sites in various Beijing neighborhoods.
