= Renmin University of China Law School =

Law school in Beijing, China

- 中国人民大学法学院
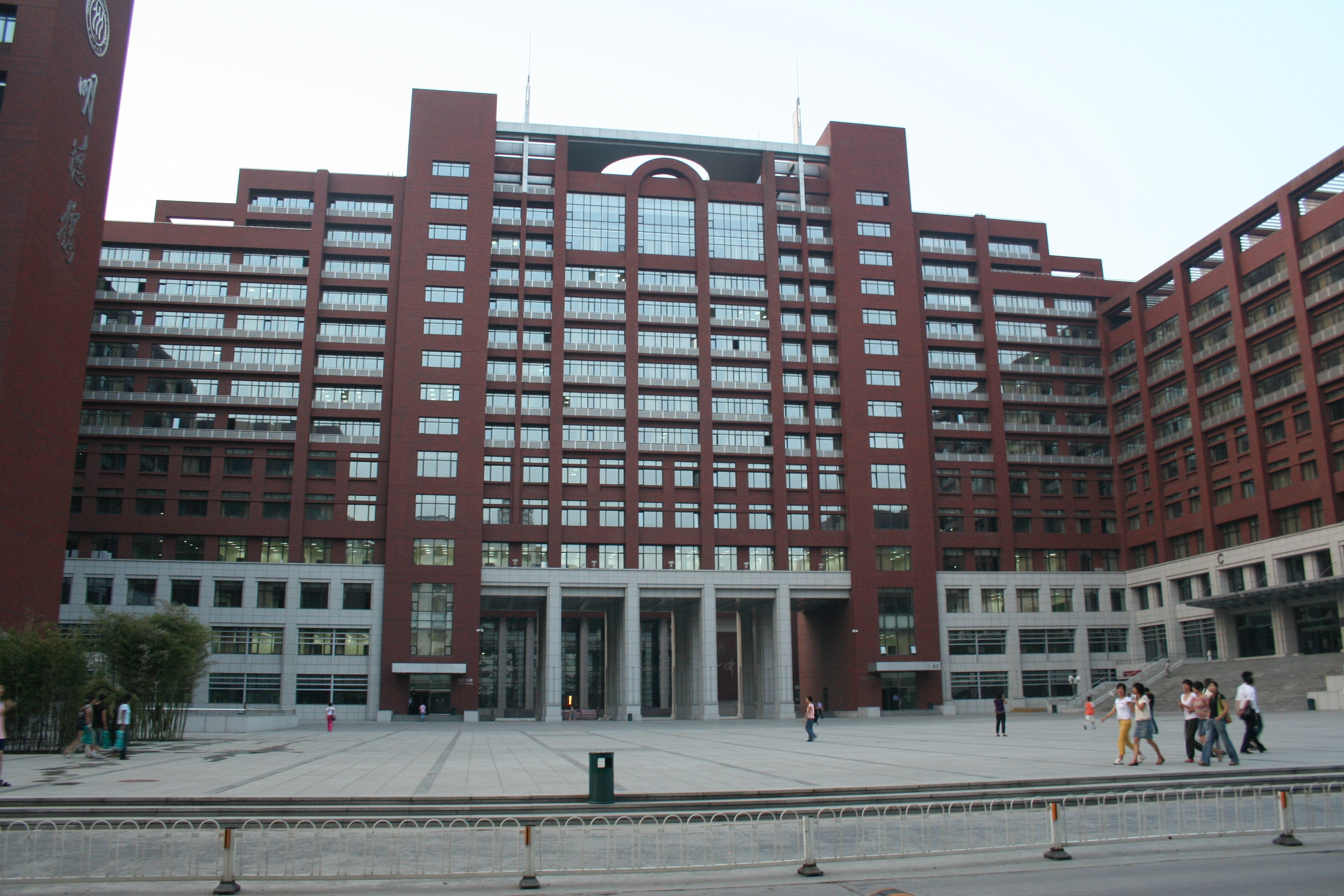
- Renmin University of China Law School in Beijing, China
- Type: Public
- Established: 1950
- Location: Beijing, China
- Dean: Wang Yi
- Website: www.law.ruc.edu.cn

Renmin University of China Law School (Chinese: 中国人民大学法学院; pinyin: Zhōngguó rénmín dàxué fǎxuéyuàn), formerly Renmin University of China Department of Law (Chinese: 中国人民大学法学系), is the school of law under Renmin University of China. It was founded as the Department of Law in 1950 and renamed to Law School in 1988. According to the evaluation reports published by the Ministry of Education of PRC every year since 2004, Renmin University of China Law School has been consistently ranked as the best law school in China. It has successfully maintained its status in the most recent evaluation conducted in 2017. Renmin University of China Law School is also considered one of the best law schools in the world and ranked 93rd in THE Rankings by Subjects and 51st-100th in the QS Rankings by Subjects in "Law and Legal Studies" subjects respectively. The current dean is Wang Yi.

After its founding in 1950, RUC Law School became the first institution of higher legal education in the People's Republic of China and, as such, is dubbed by many as the "cradle" nurturing China's most outstanding jurists. RUC Law School inherited the vaunted tradition of the former Chaoyang University when the two schools merged shortly after the founding of the PRC. Established in 1912, Chaoyang University became so synonymous with legal practice in China that the saying went: "no Chaoyang, no courts".

Chaoyang University's legacy of producing nationally recognized jurists endures in the RUC Law School of today where students and faculty continue to lead the development of China's legal system. Since 1950, more than 20,000 students have graduated from RUC Law School, while more than 300,000 jurists have received training from the Law School as continuing education students, judges, procurators, lawyers, university faculty members, and civil servants. A significant number of alumni have become leaders in advancing China's rule of law as government officials, judges, academics, public interest and corporate lawyers.

At present, RUC Law School educates more than 3,000 students annually with graduate students accounting for approximately 80% of the student body. The Law School confers undergraduate (LL.B.) and graduate degrees (LL.D. and LL.M.) in all secondary disciplines of law, including one national first-level key discipline and four national second-level key disciplines. RUC Law School also offers a bachelor's degree in law with a concentration in Intellectual Property Rights. Authorized by the State Council of China, the Law School established the nation's first post-doctoral research center covering all doctoral subject areas.

RUC Law School's 43 research institutes carry-out numerous projects of national—and international—importance. These research institutes include two Ministry of Education sponsored humanities and social science research centers, the Research Center for Criminal Jurisprudence, the Research Center of Civil & Commercial Jurisprudence, and the RUC Center for Disabled Person's Law & Legal Services. RUC Law School's expansive library houses more than 300,000 volumes, including over 50,000 foreign language sources. There are over 1,300 Chinese and 3,000 foreign law journals available to students, faculty and visiting scholars. RUC Law School edits and publishes the nation's leading law journal, the Jurists' Review, as well as the RUC Law Review and the Chaoyang Law Review. The Law School also publishes an internationally distributed English law journal, Frontiers of Law in China, which connects an English readership with the swiftly shifting trends that define China's contemporary legal landscape. In efforts to make RUC Law School's scholarship more readily available to an increasingly internet-based society, it runs a nationally recognized website entitled 'China Civil & Commercial Law'.

As part of the Law School's ongoing commitment to serving the public good, professors in RUC Law School have advised the Politburo of the Chinese Communist Party and the National People's Congress Standing Committee.

== Heads of Department and Deans of School ==
Head of the Department of Law

1. Zhu Shiying (朱世英) Aug 1950-Nov 1950
2. He Simin (何思敏) Nov 1950-July 1953
3. Yang Huanan (杨化南) July 1953-Jan 1960
4. Zhu Shiying (second term) Aug 1960-Aug 1964
5. Xu Jing (徐靖) Sep 1964-Apr 1966
6. Li Huanchang (李焕昌) July 1978-July 1983
7. Gao Mingxuan (高铭暄) Sep 1983-June 1986
8. Gu Chunde (谷春德) June 1986-Nov 1990
9. Zeng Xianyi Nov 1990-Nov 1994

Dean of the Law School

1. Zeng Xianyi Nov 1994-May 2005
2. Wang Liming May 2005 -Apr 2009
3. Han Dayuan Apr 2009 - Aug 2017
4. Wang Yi Aug 2017 - present

== Notable people ==
- Zhang Xinbao (born 1961), civil law scholar and university professor
