= Renmin University of China =

Public research university in Beijing, China

Coordinates: 39°58′13″N 116°19′04″E

- 中国人民大学
- Former name: People's University of China
- Motto: 实事求是
- Motto in English: Seeking truth from facts
- Type: Public
- Established: 1937; 89 years ago
- Affiliations: BHUA
- President: Lin Shangli (林尚立)
- Party Secretary: Zhang Donggang (张东刚)
- Faculty: 1,887 (September 2019)
- Students: 27,810 (September 2019)
- Undergraduates: 11,336
- Postgraduates: 10,505
- Location: Beijing, China
- Campus: Urban
- Website: ruc.edu.cn

Chinese name
- Simplified Chinese: 中国人民大学
- Traditional Chinese: 中國人民大學
- Literal meaning: People's University of China
Transcriptions
Standard Mandarin
- Hanyu Pinyin: Zhōngguó Rénmín Dàxué

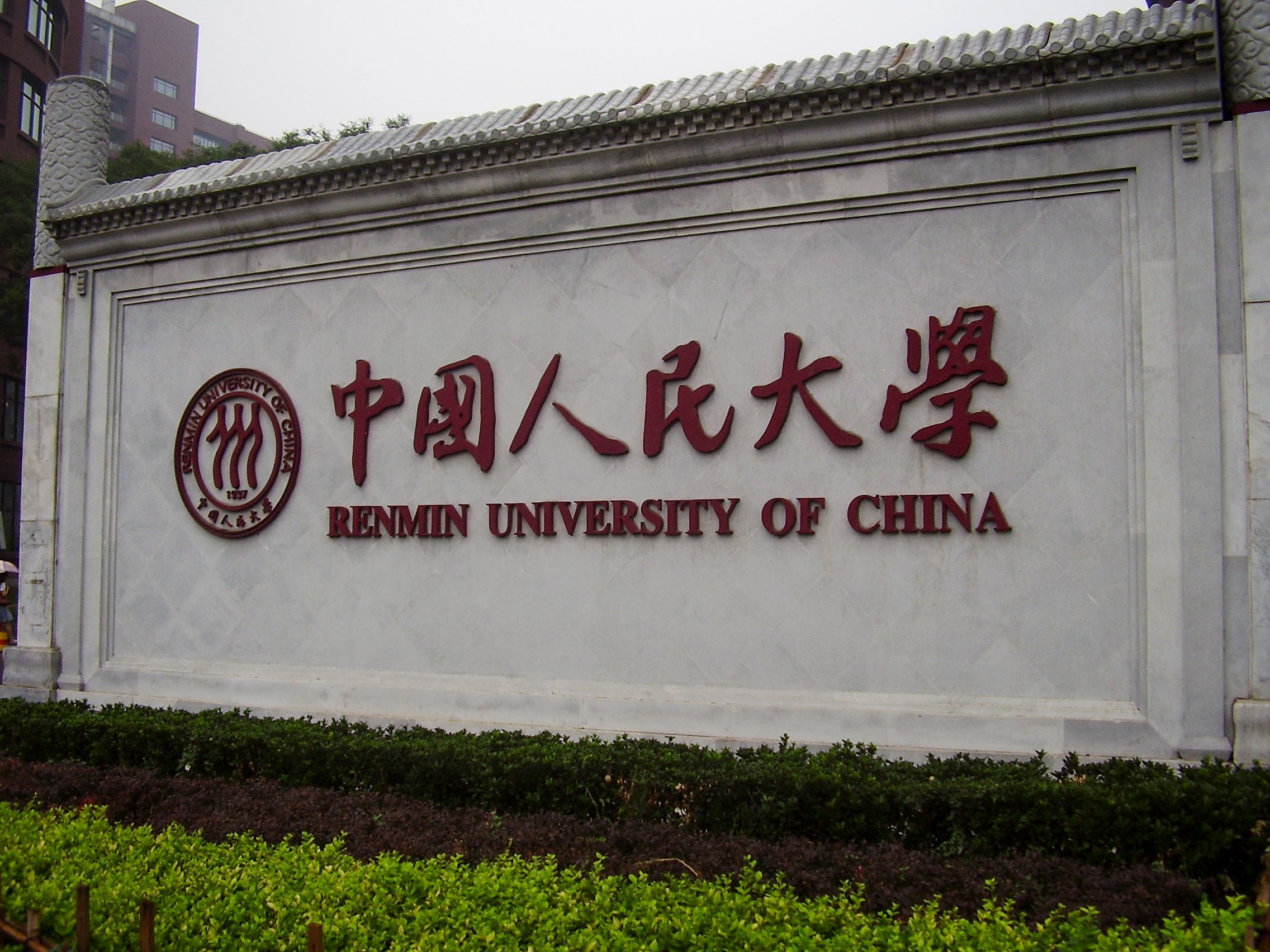
Renmin University entrance

The Renmin University of China (RUC) is a public university in Haidian, Beijing, China. The university is affiliated with the Ministry of Education, and co-funded by the Ministry of Education and the Beijing Municipal People's Government. The university is part of Project 211, Project 985, and the Double First-Class Construction.

== History ==
The origins of Renmin University of China date back to Shanbei Public School (陕北公学), established in 1937 by the Chinese Communist Party to "bring up hundreds of thousands of revolutionary comrades to meet the needs of the War of Resistance against Japanese Aggression." It was later renamed North China United University, and then North China University.

In 1950, several institutions were merged to form a single Renmin University of China. In 1954, Renmin University of China was established as one of China's six national key universities, the youngest institution on that list.

Wu Yuzhang, Cheng Fangwu, Guo Yingqiu, Yuan Baohua, Huang Da, Li Wenhai, Ji Baocheng, and Chen Yulu had successively served as president of the university. As of 2022 the president is Lin Shangli.

== Present ==
As of 2022, Renmin University consists of 25 schools, 13 research institutes and the graduate school, with 63 specialties for undergraduate, 8 specialties for the second-bachelor's degree students, 149 specialties for the master's degree candidates, 100 specialties for the Doctor's degree candidates and 33 national key disciplines.

The library of the university covers a total area of 26,000 square meters. It has 15 reading rooms and an economics hall, with more than 2,000 seats.

Renmin University has established its communications and cooperative relationships with 125 universities and research institutions of 32 countries and regions, which enables the university to be the center of academic and cultural communications between China and foreign countries.

== Schools and departments ==
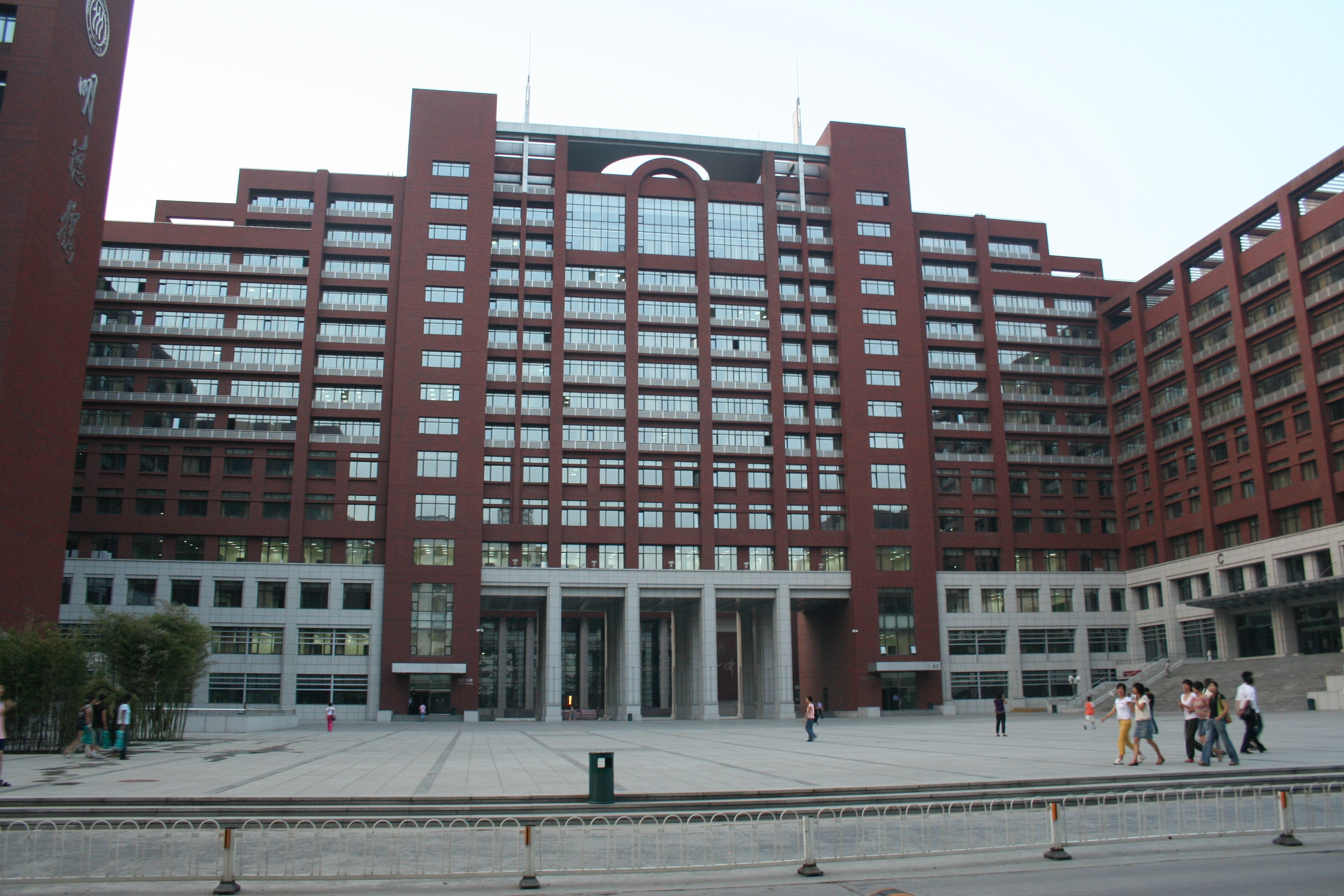
Renmin University of China Law School

- The School of Agricultural Economics and Rural Development
- The School of Arts
- The School of Business
- The School of Chinese Classics
- The School of Continuing Education
- The School of Economics
- The School of Education
- The School of Environment and Natural Resources
- The School of Finance
- The School of Foreign Languages
  - Department of English Studies
  - Department of French Studies
  - Department of German Studies
  - Department of Japanese Studies
  - Department of Russian Studies
  - Department of Spanish Studies
- The School of History
- The School of Information
- The School of Information Resource Management
- The School of International Studies
  - Department of International Politics
  - Department of Foreign Affairs
  - Department of Politics
- The School of Journalism
- The School of Labor and Human Resources
- The School of Law
- The School of Literary Studies
- The School of Marxism Studies
- The School of Teaching Chinese as Foreign Language
- The School of Philosophy
- The School of Public Administration and Policy
- The School of Statistics
- The School of Sociology and Population Studies
  - Department of Sociology
  - Department of Social Work
  - Department of Demography
- Department of Psychology
- The School of Science
  - Department of Physics
  - Department of Chemistry
- The Institute of Qing History
- Sino–French Institute

In 2015, the China Academy of Financial Inclusion was established at Renmin University. The academy is a government think-tank tasked with developing financial inclusion mechanisms for China.

On 25 October 2017, Renmin University established a Xi Jinping Thought research center, the first of its kind.

On 25 May 2024, Renmin University opened The Research Center for Shiology. The current director is Liu Guangwei, the founder of Shiology and director-general of the World Shiology Forum.

=== Rural Reconstruction Center ===
The Rural Reconstruction Center of Renmin University was established in 2005 and is based in Beijing. Its main mission is to explore the theory and practice of rural reconstruction. It partakes in fair trade advocacy, coordination of urban and rural green energy initiatives, and the promotion of fair education.

== Campuses ==
The university currently has two active campuses, one campus under construction and one former campus.

- The main campus is located at No.59 Zhongguancun Street, Haidian district, Beijing. Most of the university's schools, departments and institutes are located here.
  - The campus's English Corner is well known in Beijing. Every Friday evening, people gather at the Qiushi Garden near the east gate to practice English.
  - The campus is host to about 1,165 international students, many of them from South Korea. There are so many South Korean students that the International Students Dining Room has a separate Korean menu aside from its traditional Chinese menu.
- The university has a secondary campus located in Suzhou Industrial Park, in the eastern province of Jiangsu. It is home to the RUC Sino-French Institute (IFC Renmin) and its 900 Chinese and international students. In addition, a number of Chinese and sino-foreign Master-level programs from several RUC faculties are also located on the same grounds under the supervision of RUC International College. RUC Suzhou campus is part of the Suzhou Dushu Lake Higher Education Town, together with other international Sino-Foreign oriented graduate and post-graduate schools such as Xi'an Jiaotong-Liverpool University or the Southeast University-Monash University Joint Graduate School.
- Renmin University is currently building its future main campus in Lucheng, Tongzhou district, currently named "Eastern Campus", to the east of central Beijing. It will be located in the same town as the soon-to-be relocated Beijing municipal government facilities. Completion date is expected by the end of 2017.
- The former main campus of Renmin University of China is located east of the Forbidden City, in the Dongcheng district. Although the property still belongs to the university, it is no longer used for educational purposes.
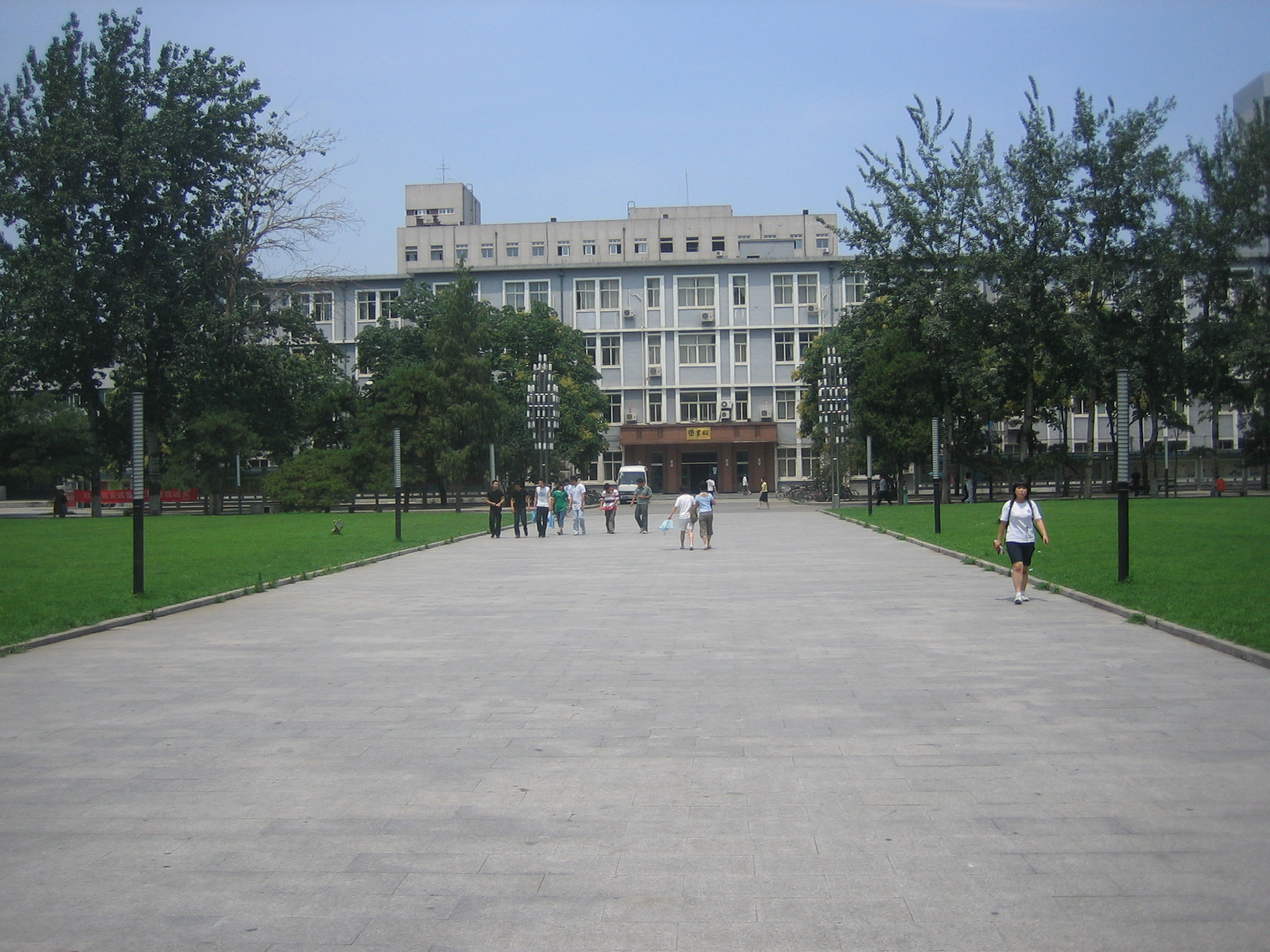
Quadrangle in front of Number 2 Teaching Building.

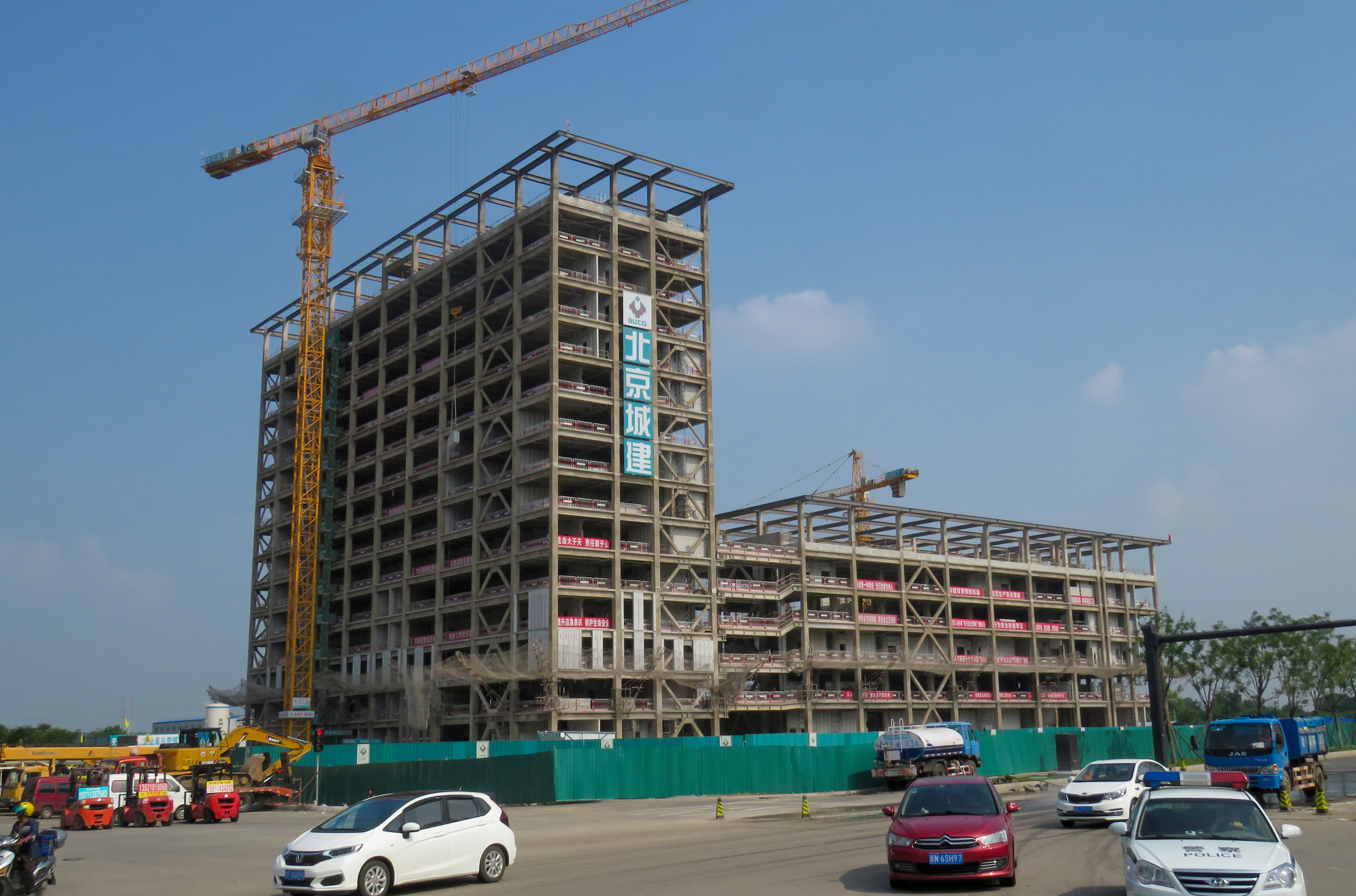
East campus under construction in July 2018

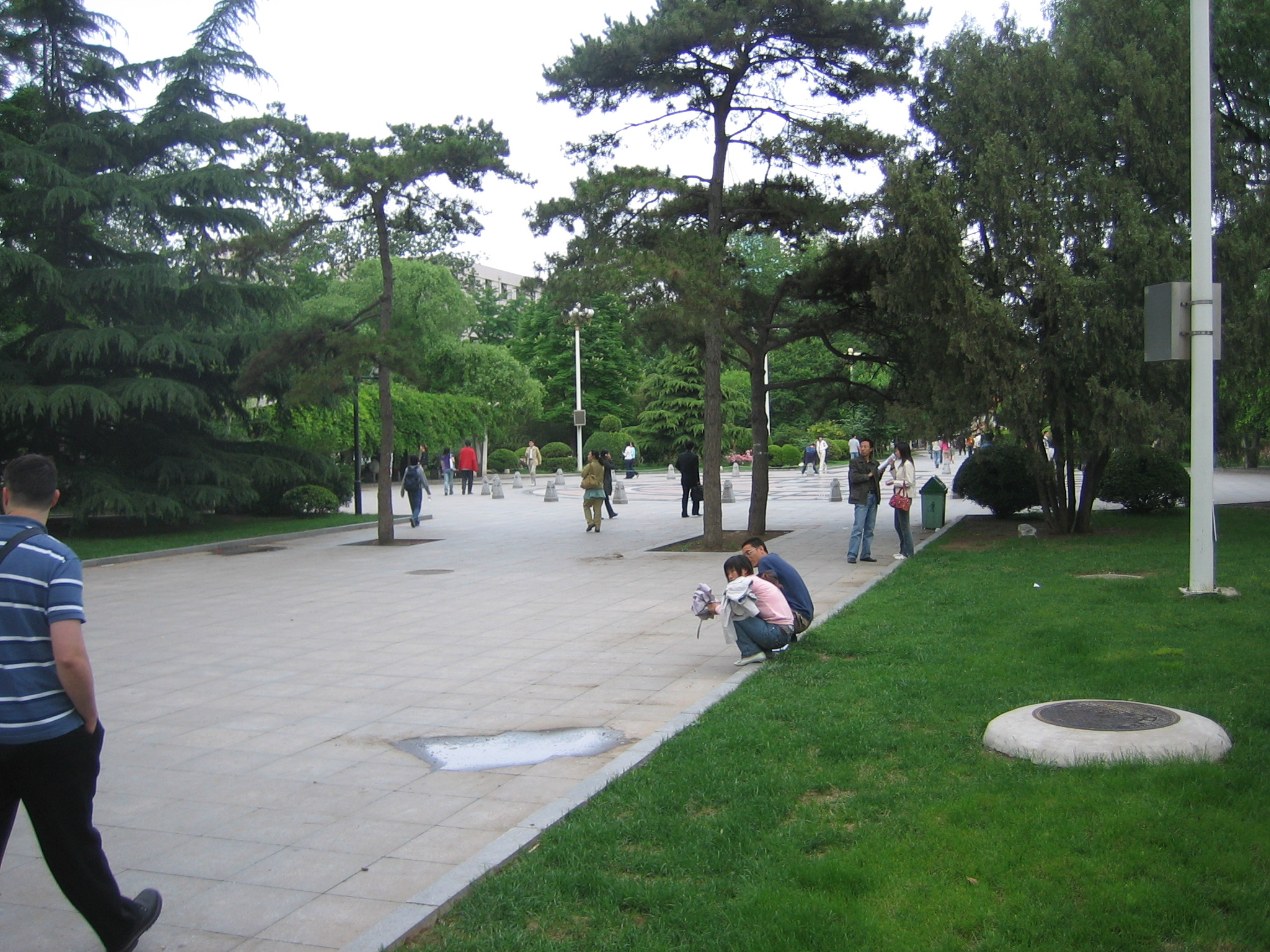
The English Corner by day

== Cultural tradition ==
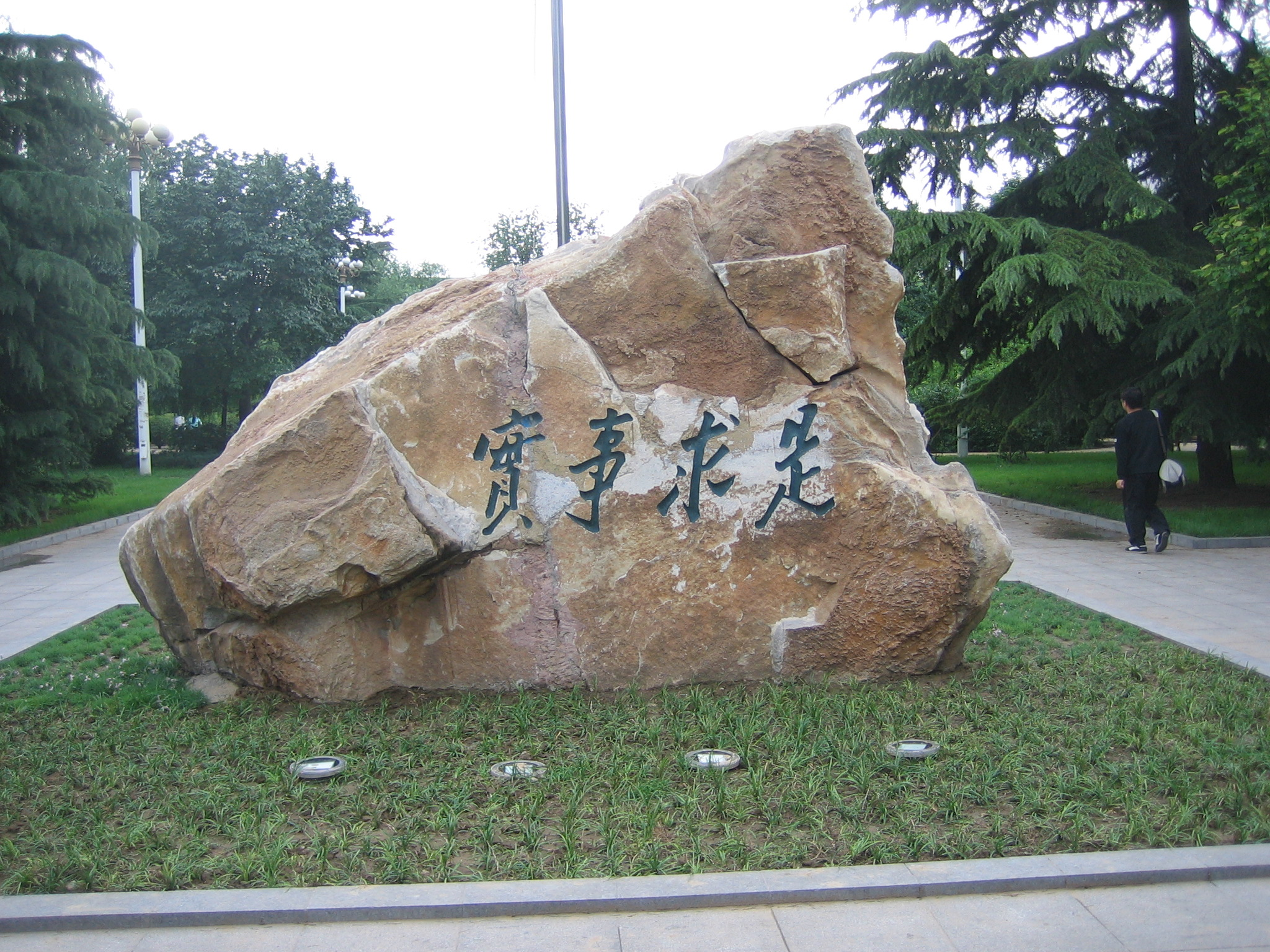
The rock holding the engraved motto of the university, "seeking truth from facts"

The motto of Renmin University is "Seek truth from facts"; the spirit of Renmin University is "Establishing learning for the people, and governing the country"; the goal of talent training of Renmin University is "a national example, a social pillar"; and the idea of running Renmin University is "people, people-oriented, and humanistic", which is also the meaning of the three parallel "人" characters in the seal script on Renmin University's emblem.

=== School Song ===
The school song of Renmin University of China has gone through multiple versions, including the "Song of Northern Shaanxi Public School" created in Yan'an in 1937, "The School Song of North China Associated University" in Shanxi-Chahar-Hebei border area in 1937, and "School Song of North China University" in Zhengding, Hebei in 1948, "Song of Renmin University of China" written by Wu Yuzhang, "Song of Renmin University of China" written by Cheng Fangwu, and "Song of Renmin University of China" written by Ji Baocheng. "The Song of Renmin University of China", written by Ji Baocheng, was identified as the school song in 2007, replacing the old school song that has been adopted since 1980 with strong political overtones. In 2017, "Song of Northern Shaanxi Public School" was identified as the representative school song of Renmin University of China.

== Rankings and reputation ==
University rankings
BCUR National	Domestic	17
Wu Shulian National	Domestic	21
CUAA National	Alumni	12
QS National	General	38
QS Asia (Asia version)	General	103
ARWU World	Research	301–400
QS World	General	=566
USNWR World	General	343

In 2022, Renmin University, along with Nanjing University, became the first batch of elite institutions in China to drop out of all international rankings. The university was selected as a pilot program to test a new system of local rankings that reflect "Chinese characteristics" and are representative of their Chinese traits. It is expected that more Chinese institutions will drop out of international rankings as China aims to create its own benchmark for elite institutions.

In 2015, the Chinese University Alumni Association (CUAA) in partnership with China Education Center ranked it 5th among all Chinese universities. The Times Higher Education World University Rankings 2014 placed Renmin 5th in China (after Peking, Tsinghua, University of Science and Technology of China, and Fudan), 13th in emerging countries, 32nd in Asia, and inside the top 250 in the world.

In 2020, the QS World University Rankings had the university as one of the top 300 worldwide for academic reputation and employer reputation. Renmin graduates are highly desired in China and worldwide, with its Graduate Employability rankings placed in the top 181–190 universities globally and a crop of high-achieving graduates every year, according to the 2022 QS Graduate Employability Rankings.

=== Subject rankings ===
According to the latest evaluation by the Chinese Ministry of Education RUC ranked No. 1 among all Chinese universities for 9 disciplines, which include theoretical economics, applied economics, law and legal studies, political science, sociology, journalism, statistics, business management and public administration. RUC is also entitled 25 national key disciplines (ranked number 5 in China), 13 national key research bases of humanities and social sciences (ranked number 1 in China), and 6 national teaching and research bases of fundamental arts disciplines (ranked number 1 in China). Renmin has taken a leading position among Chinese universities in the number of social science and arts and humanities-related majors. For example, in the 2022 rankings of Chinese universities by undergraduate majors in 92 professional categories, Renmin had 25 majors ranked as the best in the country, 48 majors in the top 5, and 57 majors in the top 10.

According to the 2021 QS World University by subject, RUC was ranked among the top 100 in the world in "Arts and Humanities" & "Social Sciences & Management" related subjects. According to the 2021 QS World University by subject, the university was ranked among the top 40 in the world for philosophy, top 80 in social sciences and management and top 51 in legal studies and law.

According to the Financial Times, its business school, the Renmin Business School, is one of the top 50 in the world, with its global MBA ranked 38th, Executive MBA ranked 43rd, and its executive education ranked 11th internationally (the best in Asia).

As of 2026, the U.S. News & World Report ranked Renmin 3rd in China & Asia, and 11th globally in economics and business.

As of 2024, according to the Academic Ranking of World Universities, RUC ranked No. 9 in the world in "public administration", #31 in "finance", #43 in "Library & Information Science", #51 in "management" & "statistics", and #76 in "business administration" & "economics".

== Notable faculty ==
- Huang Da – Professor Emeritus, School of Finance; President, Renmin University of China (1991–1994).
- Jin Canrong – Professor, School of International Studies.
- Liu Xiaofeng – Professor, School of Liberal Arts.
- Manuel Pérez García – Former associate professor, School of International Studies (2013–2017).
- Mao Shoulong – Professor, School of Public Administration.
- Pan Suiming – Professor, School of Sociology and Population Studies, scholar of sexology.
- Shi Yinhong – Professor, School of International Studies, see zh:时殷弘
- Song Xinning (宋新宁) – Jean Monnet Professor, School of International Studies.
- Wang Liming – Professor and former dean (2005–09), School of Law, scholar of civil law.
- Wen Tiejun – Professor and dean, School of Agricultural Economics and Rural Development.
- Wu Xiaoqiu (吴晓求) – Professor, School of Finance.
- Yang Ruilong (杨瑞龙) – Professor and dean, School of Economics.
- Baron von Pfetten – Visiting professor, School of Economics.
- Zeng Xianyi – Professor Emeritus and former dean (1990–2005), School of Law, scholar of legal history.
- Zhang Kangzhi – Professor in the Department of Public Administration.
- Zhang Ming (张鸣) – Professor, School of International Studies.
- Zhou Xiaozheng (周孝正) – Professor, School of Sociology and Population Studies.

== Notable alumni ==
=== Academics ===
- Liu Yu – Political scientist at Tsinghua University
- Wu Shuqing – President of Peking University (1989–1996), economist
- Zhao Tingyang – Political philosopher at the Chinese Academy of Social Sciences

=== Law and politics ===
- Han Xu – Ambassador to the United States (1985–1989).
- Liu Yandong – Current highest-ranking female politician in China, and the only woman with a seat on the Politburo.
- Ma Kai – Chairman of the National Development and Reform Commission (2003–2008).
- Xiao Yang – Chief Justice of the Supreme People's Court (1998–2003, 2003–2008).
- Xie Feng – Vice Minister of Foreign Affairs (2021–2023) and current Ambassador to the United States.
- Wang Ju-hsuan – Minister of Council of Labor Affairs of the Republic of China (2008–2012).
- Chen Yulu – Deputy governor of People's Bank of China (2015–2022) and current president of Nankai University.
- You Quan – Director of the United Front Work Department (2017–2022)
- Grace Mugabe – Former First Lady of Zimbabwe (1996–2017)
- Liu He – A member of the politburo of the Chinese Communist Party, one of the vice premiers of the People's Republic of China and the director of the Central Financial and Economic Affairs Commission
- Zhou Dan – First openly gay lawyer in mainland China to speak out for LGBT rights

=== Business and media ===
- Duan Yongping – Entrepreneur and investor, founder of Subor (English: Xiao Ba Wang; Chinese: 小霸王; pinyin: Xiǎo Bàwáng) and BBK (Chinese: 步步高; pinyin: Bù Bù Gāo)
- Hu Shuli – Founder and editor-in-chief of business magazine Caijing
- Pan Gongsheng – Executive Vice President, Agricultural Bank of China
- Xiang Junbo – chairman, Agricultural Bank of China (2009–)
- Xiao Gang – chairman, Bank of China (2003–)
- Zhang Lei – Founder and President of Hillhouse Capital Group
- Liu Qiangdong – Founder and President of JD.com

=== Human rights activists ===
- Bob Fu – One of the organizers of the Tiananmen Square protests of 1989, he founded ChinaAid to provide legal aid to dissidents in China.
- Zeng Jinyan – Human rights activist, one of the Time 100, 2007; wife of Hu Jia, recipient of the Sakharov Prize for Freedom of Thought in 2008.
- Zhang Zhixin – Dissident imprisoned and executed for criticising the idolisation of Mao Zedong during the Cultural Revolution.

=== Writers ===
- Wang Xiaobo – Modern writer, popular and influential among China's youth. He is also the husband of Li Yinhe, renowned sociologist and sexologist.
- Zhang Jie – Writer, graduated from RUC in 1960. Her work has won many prizes.

=== Others ===
- James Veneris and Samuel David Hawkins – American soldiers in the Korean War who were captured by the North, then defected to China at the time of armistice.
- Guo Jingjing – Gold medalist in the 3 m Springboard and Synchronized Springboard at the 2004 Summer Olympics
- Wang Junxia – Winner of a gold medal and a silver medal in woman's track in the 1996 Summer Olympics; record holder of the woman's 10000 m from 1993 with a time of 29:31:78.
- Liang Yan – National Women's volleyball team member
- Dai Yi – Historian
- Lin Yue – Gold medalist, Olympian, 10 m platform Diving
- Huo Liang – Gold medalist, Olympian, 10 m Platform Diving
- Li Ting – Gold medalist, Olympian, 10 m Platform Diving
- Peng Bo – Gold medalist, Olympian, 3 m Springboard Diving
- Wu Minxia – Gold medalist, Olympian, 3 m Springboard Diving
- Sang Xue – Gold medalist, Olympian, 10 m platform Diving
- Vivian Kong – Hong Kong gold medalist, Olympian, women's individual épée fencing
- Shi Yan – Farmer and founder of the first Community Supported Agriculture farm in China

== Global reach ==
Renmin University maintains collaborative relationships and exchange programs with many well-known universities around the world, such as Singapore Management University, Queen's University, Boston College Law School, Columbia University, LMU Munich, Princeton University, University of Geneva, McGill University, Queen Mary University of London, King's College London, Waseda University, Carleton University, the University of Chicago, Rutgers, The State University of New Jersey, the University of Michigan and Yale University. In January 2010, Zhang Lei, a graduate of Renmin University and Yale School of Management (SOM), donated US$8,888,888 to the SOM, the largest alumni gift the school had received.

It is also a member of Worldwide Universities Network, the Asia-Pacific Association for International Education, and Beijing-Hong Kong Universities Alliance.

Renmin University School of Labor and Human Resources maintains an exchange relationship with the Huamin Research Center and the School of Social Work at Rutgers University. Every year since 2010, study abroad students and faculty from Rutgers exchange with their Renmin University counterparts. Renmin University is a popular destination for visiting foreign dignitaries. During his state visit to China in January 2008, British Prime Minister Gordon Brown visited Renmin University with Premier Wen Jiabao to talk with students, scholars, athletes and entrepreneurs.

The School of International Studies offers a Double Masters in Asian and International Affairs with King's College London.

Renmin University students are actively engaged in academic and exchange programs overseas, such as the National Model United Nations conference held annually in New York City.

The University of Chicago Center in Beijing, which opened in September 2010, is located at the Culture Plaza on the Renmin University campus.

== Affiliated schools ==
The High School Affiliated to Renmin University of China is a high school in Beijing, and is a sister school of Phillips Academy in Massachusetts, Phillips Exeter Academy in New Hampshire and Punahou Academy in Honolulu.

The Elementary School Affiliated to Renmin University of China is a primary school in Beijing, and is a sister school of Mandarin Immersion Magnet School in Houston, Texas.
