= List of children's hospitals =

This is a list of children's hospitals, hospitals that specialize in pediatrics.

A children's hospital is a hospital that offers its services exclusively to children and adolescents. Most children's hospitals can serve people from birth up to the age of 21. The number of children's hospitals proliferated in the 20th century, as pediatric medical and surgical specialties separated from internal medicine and adult surgical specialties.

Children's hospitals are characterized by greater attention to the psychosocial support of children and their families. Some children and young people have to spend relatively long periods in the hospital, so having access to play and teaching staff can also be an important part of their care. With local partnerships, this can include trips to local botanical gardens, the zoo, and public libraries, for instance.

In addition to psychosocial support, children's hospitals have the added benefit of being staffed by professionals who are trained in treating children. A medical doctor that undertakes vocational training in pediatrics must also be accepted for membership by a professional college before they can practice pediatrics. While many normal hospitals can treat children adequately, pediatric specialists may be a better choice when it comes to treating rare afflictions that may prove fatal or severely detrimental to young children, in some cases before birth. Also, many children's hospitals will continue to see children with rare illnesses into adulthood, allowing for a continuity of care.

== International ==
- Shriners Hospitals for Children, North America

== Argentina ==
=== Ciudad Autónoma de Buenos Aires ===
- Hospital Italiano de Buenos Aires
- Garrahan Pediatric Hospital
- Hospital de Niños R. Gutierrez
- Hospital Pedro de Elizalde ex Casa Cuna

=== Cordoba ===
- Children's Hospital of the Holy Trinity
- Pediatric Hospital of the Child Jesus

=== Tucuman ===
- Hospital del Niño Jesus

== Australia ==
=== Australian Capital Territory ===
- Centenary Hospital for Women and Children, Canberra

=== New South Wales ===
- John Hunter Children's Hospital, Newcastle
- Sydney Children's Hospital, Randwick
- The Children's Hospital at Westmead

=== Queensland ===
- Queensland Children's Hospital, Brisbane
- Mater Childrens Hospital (former children's hospital in Brisbane)
- Royal Children's Hospital, Herston (former children's hospital in Brisbane)
- The Prince Charles Hospital, Brisbane (Combined Adult/Children's Hospital)

=== South Australia ===
- Women's and Children's Hospital, Adelaide

=== Victoria ===
- Monash Children's Hospital, Clayton
- Royal Children's Hospital, Parkville

=== Western Australia ===
- Perth Children's Hospital

== Austria ==
- Anna-Kinderspital, former children's hospital in Graz
- Gottfried von Preyer’sches Kinderspital, Vienna
- Karolinen-Kinderspital, former children's hospital in Vienna
- Kinderklinik Glanzing, Vienna, integrated into Wilhelminenspital
- Kindersanatorium Sonnegg, Hirschegg (Vorarlberg)
- Landes-Kinderkrankenhaus, Linz
- Leopoldstädter Kinderspital, former children's hospital in Vienna
- Mautner Markhof’sches Kinderspital, former children's hospital in Vienna
- St. Anna Kinderspital, Vienna
- Sankt-Josef-Kinderspital, former children's hospital in Vienna

== Belgium ==
- Hôpital universitaire des enfants Reine Fabiola

== Bangladesh ==
- Aurobindo Childrens Hospital, Bangladesh

=== Chittagong ===
- Chittagong Maa-Shishu O General Hospital, Agrabad, Chittagong

=== Dhaka ===
- Dhaka Shishu Hospital

== Brazil ==
=== São Paulo ===
- HIS - Hospital Infantil Sabará

=== Curitiba ===
- HPP - Hospital Pequeno Príncipe

=== Fortaleza ===
- HIAS - Hospital Infantil Albert Sabin

=== Recife ===
- IMIP - Instituto Materno-Infantil Professor Fernando Figueira

=== Porto Alegre ===
- Hospital da Criança Santo Antônio

== Canada ==
=== Alberta ===
- Alberta Children's Hospital, Calgary
- Stollery Children's Hospital, Edmonton

=== British Columbia ===
- British Columbia Children's Hospital, Vancouver

=== Manitoba ===
- The Children's Hospital of Winnipeg, Winnipeg

=== Newfoundland and Labrador ===
- Janeway Children's Health and Rehabilitation Centre, St. John's

=== Nova Scotia ===
- IWK Health Centre, Halifax

=== Ontario ===
- Children's Hospital at London Health Sciences Centre, London
- Children's Hospital of Eastern Ontario, Ottawa
- Holland Bloorview Kids Rehabilitation Hospital, Toronto
- The Hospital for Sick Children, Toronto
- McMaster Children's Hospital, Hamilton

=== Quebec ===
- Centre hospitalier universitaire Sainte-Justine, Montreal
- Centre mère-enfant du centre hospitalier de l'Université Laval, Quebec City
- Montreal Children's Hospital, Montreal
- Shriners Hospital for Children – Canada, Montreal (orthopedics)

=== Saskatchewan ===
- Jim Pattison Children's Hospital, Saskatoon

== Chile ==
- Hospital Exequiel Gonzalez Cortes, Santiago
- Hospital Luis Calvo Mackenna, Santiago
- Hospital Roberto del Río, Santiago

== China ==
=== Beijing ===
- Beijing New Century International Hospital for Children (private)
- Children's Hospital of Capital Institute of Pediatrics
- Shanghai Children's Hospital, Capital Medical University

=== Shanghai ===
- Children's Hospital of Fudan University
- Shanghai Jiao Tong University School of Medicine
  - International Peace Maternity and Child Health Hospital, China Welfare Institute
  - Shanghai Children's Hospital
  - Shanghai Children's Medical Center

== Colombia ==
- Fundación Hospital de la Misericordia
- Hospital Infantil Napoleón Franco Pareja
- Fundación Clínica Infantil Club Noel
- Hospital Infantil Universitario de San José

== Croatia ==
- Children's hospital Srebrnjak, Zagreb
- Clinic for child diseases Zagreb, Zagreb

== Finland ==
- Childrens Castle, Helsinki
- Eye and Ear hospital, Helsinki
- Helsinki Children's Hospital, Helsinki
- Jorvi Hospital, Espoo
- Kätilöopisto Maternity Hospital, Helsinki
- Women's clinic, Helsinki

== France ==
- Necker–Enfants Malades Hospital, Paris
- Hôpital Armand-Trousseau, Paris
- Hôpital Robert Debré, Paris
- Hôpital Femme Mères Enfants de Bron, Lyon
- La Timone-Enfants, Marseille
- Hôpital Jeanne de Flandres, Lille
- Hôpital d'Enfants de Brabois, Nancy
- Hôpital d'Enfants de Hautepierre, Strasbourg
- Hôpital Enfants-Adolescent, Nantes
- Centre hospitalier universitaire Clocheville, Tours

== Germany ==
- Altonaer Kinderkrankenhaus, Hamburg
- Asklepios Kinderklinik Sankt Augustin
- Bergmannsheil und Kinderklinik Buer, Gelsenkirchen
- Children's Orthopedic Hospital, Aschau im Chiemgau
- Clementine Kinderhospital, Frankfurt a. M.
- Cnopf'sche Kinderklinik, Nürnberg
- Darmstädter Kinderkliniken Prinzessin Margaret
- Dr. von Haunersches Kinderspital, München
- DRK-Kinderklinik Siegen
- Elisabeth-Kinderkrankenhaus, Oldenburg
- Jenaer Universitäts-Kinderklinik
- Josefinum, Augsburg
- Katholisches Kinderkrankenhaus Wilhelmstift, Hamburg
- Kinder- und Jugendklinik Gelsenkirchen
- Kinder-Universitätsklinikum-Ostbayern, Regensburg
- Kinderhospital Osnabrück
- Kinderklinik, Dresden
- Kinderklinik an der Lachnerstraße, München
- Kinderklinik der Ruhr-Universität, Bochum
- Kinderklinik der Universität Greifswald
- Kinderklinik Dritter Orden, Passau
- Kinderklinik Augsburg, Augsburg
- Kinderklinik Lindenhof, Berlin
- Kinderklinik, Universitätsklinikum Schleswig-Holstein, Campus Kiel
- Kinderklinik, Universitätsklinikum Schleswig-Holstein, Campus Lübeck
- Kinderkrankenhaus auf der Bult, Hannover
- Kinderkrankenhaus Park Schönfeld, Kassel
- Kinderkrankenhaus Rothenburgsort, Hamburg
- Kinderkrankenhaus St. Annastift, Ludwigshafen
- Kindernachsorgeklinik Berlin-Brandenburg, Bernau
- Kinderkrankenhaus Amsterdamer Straße, Köln
- Kinderklinik am Klinikum Schwabing
- Olgahospital, Stuttgart
- Oppenheimsches Kinderhospital, Köln
- Professor-Hess-Kinderklinik, Bremen
- Universitäts-Kinderklinik am Universitätsklinikum Würzburg
- Universitätskinderklinik Giessen, Giessen
- Vestische Kinder- und Jugendklinik Datteln

== Hong Kong ==
- The Duchess of Kent Children's Hospital at Sandy Bay, Sandy Bay
- Hong Kong Children's Hospital

Defunct

- Victoria Hospital for Women and Children, 17 Barker Road, The Peak (1897–1947)

== Hungary ==
- Bethesda Children's Hospital, Budapest
- Buda's Children's Hospital of St. John Hospital, Budapest
- Debrecen Medicine University - Pediatrics Clinic, Debrecen
- Heim Pál Children's Hospital, Budapest
- Madarász Street Children's Hospital of Heim Pál Children's Hospital, Budapest
- Pécs Medicine University - Pediatrics Clinic, Pécs
- Semmelweis University - 1st Pediatrics Clinic, Budapest
- Semmelweis University - 2nd Pediatrics Clinic, Budapest
- Szeged Medicine University - Pediatrics Clinic, Szeged
- Vadaskert Children's Psychiatric Specialist Hospital, Budapest
- Velkey László Children's Health Center of Borsod - Abaúj- Zemplén County Hospital, Miskolc

== India ==
- Surya Hospital, Mumbai

== Ireland ==
- Our Lady's Children's Hospital, Crumlin
- Tallaght Children's Hospital, Tallaght
- Temple Street Children's University Hospital, Dublin
- National Children's Hospital, Dublin

== Israel ==
- Dana-Dwek Children’s Hospital, Tel Aviv Sourasky Medical Center Tel Aviv
- The Edmond and Lily Safra Children’s Hospital and the Edmond J. Safra International Congenital Heart Center, Tel Hashomer
- Ruth Rappaport Children's Hospital, Rambam Health Care Campus Haifa
- Saban Children's Center, Soroka Hospital Be'er Sheva
- Schneider Children's Medical Center of Israel, Petah Tikva
- ALYN Woldenberg Family Hospital Pediatric and Adolescent Rehabilitation Center, Jerusalem

== Italy ==
- Bambino Gesù Hospital, Rome
- Burlo Garofolo Pediatric Institute, Trieste
- Dipartimento di Salute della Donna e del Bambino, Azienda Ospedaliera di Padova - Università di Padova
- G. Di Cristina Children Hospital, Palermo
- Istituto Giannina Gaslini, Genoa
- Meyer Children's Hospital, Florence
- Ospedale Regina Margherita, Turin
- Triacorda children's hospital, department of pediatrics at Salento University, Lecce

Jamaica Bustamante Hospital for Children

== Japan ==
- Kanagawa Children's Medical Center, Yokohama
- National Center for Child Health and Development, Tokyo
- Miyagi Children's Hospital, Sendai
- Ibaraki Children's Hospital, Mito, Ibaraki
- Jichhi Children's Medical Center, Tochigi
- Chiba Children's Hospital, Chiba
- Tokyo Metropolitan Children's Medical Center, Tokyo
- Saitama Children's Medical Center, Saitama
- Shizuoka Children' Hospital, Shizuoka
- Aichi Children's Health and Medical Center, Obu, Aichi
- Osaka Medical Center and Research Institute for Maternal and Child Health, Izumi, Osaka
- Hyogo Children's Hospital, Kobe
- Fukuoka Children' Hospital, Fukuoka

== Kenya ==
- Gertrude's Children's Hospital
- Shoe4Africa Children's Hospital, Eldoret

== Lebanon ==
- Children's Cancer Center of Lebanon, Rue Clémenceau, Beirut

== Malaysia ==
- UKM Specialist Children’s Hospital, Kuala Lumpur

== The Netherlands ==
- Beatrix Kinderziekenhuis, Groningen
- Emma Kinderziekenhuis, Amsterdam
- Juliana Kinderziekenhuis, The Hague
- Kinderziekenhuis Sint Radboud, Nijmegen
- Erasmus MC Sophia, Rotterdam
- Wilhelmina Kinderziekenhuis, Utrecht
- Prinses Maxima Centrum, Utrecht

== New Zealand ==
- Kidz First Children's Hospital, Middlemore Hospital, Auckland
- Starship Hospital, Grafton Auckland

== Mexico ==
- Hospital Infantil de México
- Instituto Nacional de Pediatría
- Other children's hospitals in Mexico City, that belong to the Federal District Health Secretariat:
  - Hospital Materno Pediatrico Xochimilco
  - Hospital Pediatrico Azcapotzalco
  - Hospital Pediatrico Iztacalco
  - Hospital Pediatrico Iztapalpa
  - Hospital Pediatrico La Villa
  - Hospital Pediatrico Legaria
  - Hospital Pediatrico Moctezuma
  - Hospital Pediatrico San Juan De Aragon
  - Hospital Pediatrico Villa

== Pakistan ==
=== Faisalabad ===
- Faisalabad Institute of Child Care

=== Islamabad ===
- IHS Children's Medical Center

=== Lahore ===
- The Children's Hospital, Lahore

=== Peshawar ===
- Khyber Children Hospital, Danishabad

== Philippines ==
- National Children's Hospital, Quezon City
- Philippine Children's Medical Center, Quezon City

== Portugal ==
- CHULC - Hospital Dona Estefânia, Lisbon
- CHUC - Hospital Pediátrico, Coimbra
- CHUP - Centro Materno-Infantil do Norte, Porto

== South Africa ==
- KwaZulu-Natal Children's Hospital, Durban
- Red Cross War Memorial Children's Hospital, Cape Town
- Nelson Mandela Children's Hospital, Gauteng

== Spain ==
=== Barcelona ===
- Hospital Sant Joan de Deu
- Hospital Materno-Infantil Vall Hebron

=== Madrid ===
- Hospital Infantil La Paz (part of General Hospital La Paz)
- Hospital Infantil Universitario Niño Jesús
- Hospital Materno-Infantil 12 de Octubre (part of University Hospital 12 de Octubre de Madrid)
- Hospital Materno-Infantil Gregorio Marañon (part of General Hospital Gregorio Marañón)

== Sri Lanka ==
- Lady Ridgeway Hospital for Children, Colombo
- Sirimavo Bandaranayake Specialized Children Hospital, Peradeniya

== Sweden ==
- Astrid Lindgren Children's Hospital (Astrid Lindgrens Barnsjukhus, Solna
- Huddinge Children's Hospital (Huddinge Barnsjukhus), Huddinge
- Queen Silvia Children's Hospital (Drottning Silvias barn- och ungdomssjukhus), Gothenburg
- Sachsska Children's Hospital (Sachsska Barnsjukhuset), Stockholm
- Skåne University Hospital's Pediatric Care Hospital (Barn- och ungdomssjukhuset, BUS) Lund
- Uppsala University Children's Hospital (Akademiska barnsjukhuset), Uppsala

== Switzerland ==
- Kinderspital Wildermeth, Biel/Bienne
- Kinderspital Zürich, Zürich-Hottingen
- Ostschweizer Kinderspital, St. Gallen
- University Children’s Hospital Basel, Basel

== Taiwan ==
- Chang Gung Children's Hospital, Taipei
- National Taiwan University Children's Hospital, Taipei

== United Arab Emirates ==
- Al Jalila Children's Specialty Hospital, Dubai

== United Kingdom ==
=== England ===
- Addenbrooke's Hospital, Cambridge
- Alder Hey Children's Hospital, Liverpool
- Belgrave Hospital for Children, London
- Birmingham Children's Hospital, Birmingham
- Bristol Royal Hospital for Children, Bristol
- Chailey Heritage School, East Sussex
- Chelsea and Westminster Hospital, London
- Children's Day Hospital, London
- Derbyshire Children's Hospital, Derby
- Evelina London Children's Hospital, London
- Foundling Hospital, London
- Great North Children's Hospital, Newcastle Upon Tyne
- Great Ormond Street Hospital, London
- John Radcliffe Hospital (Oxford Children's Hospital), Oxford
- King's College Hospital, London
- Leeds General Infirmary (Leeds Children's Hospital), Leeds
- Nottingham Children's Hospital, Nottingham
- Portland Hospital for Women and Children, London (non-NHS)
- Queen Elizabeth Hospital for Children, London
- Royal Alexandra Children's Hospital (Princess Alexandra Hospital for Sick Children), Brighton
- Royal London Hospital, Whitechapel, London
- Royal Manchester Children's Hospital, Manchester
- Royal Waterloo Hospital for Children and Women, London
- Shropshire Women’s and Children’s Centre, Princess Royal Hospital, Telford
- St George's Hospital, London
- St Mary's Hospital, London, Paddington
- Sheffield Children's Hospital, Sheffield
- Southampton Children's Hospital, Southampton
- Stoke Mandeville Hospital, Aylesbury
- University Hospital Lewisham, London

=== Northern Ireland ===
- Royal Belfast Hospital for Sick Children, Belfast

=== Scotland ===
- Royal Aberdeen Children's Hospital, Aberdeen
- Royal Hospital for Children, Glasgow
- Royal Hospital for Sick Children, Edinburgh

=== Wales ===
- Noah's Ark Children's Hospital for Wales, Cardiff

== Vietnam ==
Vietnam National Hospital of Pediatrics

== See also ==
- Children's Hospital (disambiguation)
