= Shanghai Children's Medical Center =

Geography
- Location: Pudong, Shanghai, China
- Coordinates: 31.205159°N 121.521603°E

Organisation
- Type: Specialist

Services
- Speciality: Children's hospital

History
- Opened: 1989; 37 years ago

Links
- Lists: Hospitals in China

Shanghai Children's Medical Center (SCMC, Chinese: 上海儿童医学中心) is a children's hospital in Shanghai, China, with the rank of "Grade 3, Class A (Chinese: 三级甲等)", the highest level of hospital classification in China. It is a university hospital affiliated to the School of Medicine, Shanghai Jiao Tong University. The hospital is located next to the east part of Renji Hospital .

The SCMC program was first designed in 1989 with the cooperation of Shanghai Municipal People's Government and Project HOPE. Xinhua Hospital was in charge of the preparing stage of SCMC. The hospital was founded in 1998. Mrs. Hillary Clinton, then First Lady of the United States, and Ms. Zuo Huanchen, former Vice Mayor of Shanghai, attended the opening ceremony.

== See also ==
- Shanghai Jiao Tong University School of Medicine
  - Shanghai Children's Hospital
  - International Peace Maternity and Child Health Hospital, China Welfare Institute
- Children's Hospital of Fudan University
- List of children's hospitals
