= Qian Jiaqi =

Chinese nephrologist (1939–2019)

Qian jiaqi
- Born: June 1939; Jiangsu Wuxi
- Died: November 19, 2019 (aged 80)
- Education: Shanghai Second Medical College
- Occupations: Director of Internal Medicine, Renji Hospital, Shanghai Jiao Tong University School of Medicine
- Known for: Kidney Disease Research

Qian Jiaqi (Chinese: 钱家麒; June 1939 – 19 November 2019), also romanized as Jia-Qi Qian, was a Chinese nephrologist and professor at Renji Hospital of Shanghai Jiao Tong University School of Medicine. He was the first clinical physician to perform hemodialysis and peritoneal dialysis in China, and established a Kt/V value of at least 1.7 as the target for peritoneal dialysis.

== Biography ==
Qian was born in June 1939 in Wuxi, Jiangsu, Republic of China. Upon graduating from Shanghai Second Medical College (now Shanghai Jiao Tong University School of Medicine) in 1963, he worked at the college's affiliated Renji Hospital, where he worked under professors Huang Mingxin 黄铭新 and Jiang Shaoji. He later served as Professor and Director of Nephrology at Renji Hospital.

A pioneer of nephrology in China, Qian was the first clinical physician to perform hemodialysis and peritoneal dialysis in the country. He participated in the development of China's first indigenously designed dialyzer and created its first hemodialysis registration system in Shanghai.

Qian was the first to propose and demonstrate a Kt/V value of at least 1.7 as the target for peritoneal dialysis, which has since been adopted worldwide. He published hundreds of research papers and received the State Science and Technology Progress Award (Second Class) as well as many other awards.

Qian died on 19 November 2019 at Renji Hospital, aged 80.
