= Shanghai Chest Hospital =

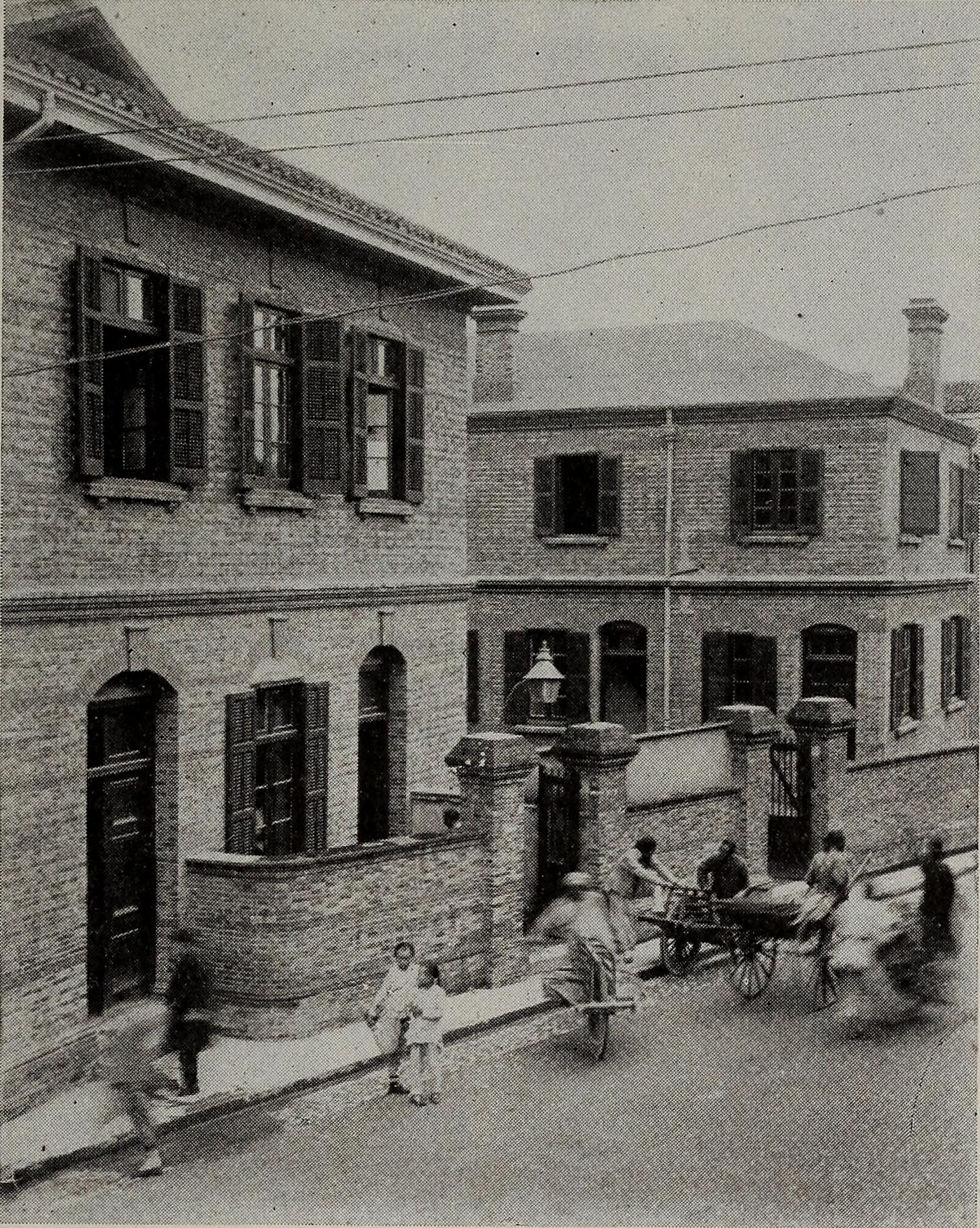
- St. Luke's Hospital in 1909

Geography
- Location: Xuhui District, Shanghai, China
- Coordinates: 31.200709°N 121.430679°E

Organisation
- Type: Teaching
- Affiliated university: Shanghai Jiao Tong University School of Medicine

Services
- Beds: 580
- Speciality: Cardiology, respirology, thoracic and cardiovascular surgery

History
- Founded: 1866; 160 years ago (as St. Luke's Hospital); 1957; 69 years ago (as Shanghai Chest Hospital)

Links
- Website: www.shxkyy.com
- Lists: Hospitals in China

Shanghai Chest Hospital (Chinese: 上海市胸科医院) is the first hospital in China specializing in cardiovascular systems, lung, esophagus, trachea and mediastinum.

== History ==
Founded in Shanghai in 1866, St. Luke's Hospital (Chinese: 同仁醫院) was merged with St. Elizabeth's Hospital (Chinese: 廣仁醫院) in 1942 to form St. Luke's & St. Elizabeth's Hospital (or Hongren Hospital, Chinese: 宏仁醫院). Both hospitals were sponsored by the American Episcopal Church.

Hongren Hospital was affiliated to the Shanghai Second Medical College in 1954. It was reorganised as Shanghai Chest Hospital in 1957. Huang Jiasi served as the first president, and the first vice-presidents were Lan Xichun and Gu Kaishi. In 1957, it was designated by Ministry of Health as a national training center for cadio-vascular and chest surgery. In 1994, it was designated Grade 3, Class A hospital. In 2004, it became Shanghai Red Cross Chest Hospital. Since 2005, it has been affiliated to Shanghai Jiao Tong University.
