= Shanghai Children's Hospital =

Coordinates: 31.229512°N 121.448743°E

Geography
- Location: Jing'an District, Shanghai, China

Organisation
- Care system: Public
- Type: Teaching
- Affiliated university: Shanghai Jiao Tong University School of Medicine

Services
- Emergency department: Yes
- Beds: 920

History
- Founded: 1937; 89 years ago

Links
- Website: www.shchildren.com.cn
- Lists: Hospitals in China

The Shanghai Children's Hospital (simplified Chinese: 上海市儿童医院; traditional Chinese: 上海市兒童醫院; pinyin: Shànghǎi Shì Értóng Yīyuàn), founded in 1937 as the Underprivileged Children's Hospital, is the first children's hospital in China, and a prominent comprehensive hospital specialized in children's diseases. It is a teaching hospital affiliated with Shanghai Jiao Tong University School of Medicine.

== Overview ==
The hospital has a 370-bed pediatric hospital located on West Beijing Road in the Jing'an district and a 550-bed hospital which opened in 2014 in the Changfeng ecological business area, Putuo District. The hospital treats over one million outpatients annually.

Major Institutes within the Shanghai Children's Hospital include: Shanghai Institute of Medical Genetics, Shanghai Children's Health Care Center, Shanghai Children's Emergency Center, Shanghai Newborn Screening Center, Shanghai Children's Rehabilitation Center, SJTU Congenital Urogenital Malformations Surgery Disease Diagnosis and Treatment Center and the SJTU Respiratory Infectious Disease Diagnosis and Treatment Center.

Clinical Departments include: Intensive Care Unit, Neonatology, Nephrology and Rheumatology, Respiratory, Hematology, Gastroenterology, Cardiology, Neurology, General Surgery, Cardiovascular Disease, Neurosurgery, Orthopedics, Urology, Otolaryngology, Children's Health-care, Dermatology, Traditional Chinese Medicine and Stomatology.

== History ==
The hospital was founded in 1937 as the Underprivileged Children's Hospital (Chinese: 上海难童医院), by doctors Fu Wenshou (富文寿; W. S. Fu) and Su Zufei (苏祖斐). It was the first children's hospital in China. During World War II, when large numbers of European Jewish refugees fled to Shanghai, the hospital, under Superintendent Dr. Fu, provided treatment to sick children and pregnant women free of charge.

It was renamed Shanghai Children's Hospital in 1953, and became a teaching hospital of Shanghai Jiao Tong University School of Medicine in 2003.

== See also ==
- Shanghai Jiao Tong University School of Medicine
  - Shanghai Children's Medical Center
- Children's Hospital of Fudan University
- List of children's hospitals
