= Lori West =

American-Canadian pediatric cardiologist

- Born: United States
- Spouse: Jeffrey Smallhorn

Academic background
- Education: BSc, University of Florida; MD, 1983, Tulane University School of Medicine; DPhil, 1995, Balliol College, Oxford

Lori Jeanne West FRSC OC is an American-Canadian pediatric cardiologist. She holds the Tier 1 Canada Research Chair in Cardiac Transplantation at the University of Alberta.

== Early life and education ==
West was born in the United States. She completed her undergraduate degree at the University of Florida, where she was initially most interested in field biology and ornithology. Following this, West earned her medical degree at the Tulane University School of Medicine in 1983 and completed her pediatric training at the University of California, Los Angeles. She also decided to train in pediatric cardiology and moved to Toronto to study at the Hospital for Sick Children. As pediatric transplantation became more popular, West chose to pursue her DPhil from Balliol College, Oxford in 1995.

== Career ==
Upon returning to North America, West took over the transplant program at Toronto's Hospital for Sick Children in 1994. While serving in this role, she pioneered the procedure to successfully transplant a heart from someone with one blood type into a baby with a different blood type. West's first ABO-incompatible heart transplant was on a baby named Caleb with type o blood. She conducted the transplant on the theory that a newborn's immune system was so immature, it had not yet developed the antibodies to attack the foreign heart.

West and her husband's tenure at Sick Kids ended in 2005 when they were recruited by Terry Klassen to join Alberta's Stollery Children's Hospital. As a researcher in the University of Alberta (U of A) Faculty of Medicine and Dentistry, she was appointed the head of Canada's first national transplant research program. Due to her overall research and transplant success, West was recognized by Alberta Venture as one of the province's 50 Most Influential People in 2014. In the same year, West was also named to a three-year term on the Governing Council of the Canadian Institutes of Health Research.

In 2017, West was elected a Fellow of the Royal Society of Canada for having "focused her career on finding treatments for infants with lethal cardiac malformations." She was also re-appointed the Tier 1 Canada Research Chair in Cardiac Transplantation. During the COVID-19 pandemic, West led a study to discover why people with different blood types react differently to the novel coronavirus. Later in December, she was named an Officer of the Order of Canada for "her leadership in the field of organ transplantation and donation, notably for her breakthrough research in infant heart transplantation."

== Personal life ==
West is married to Jeffrey Smallhorn, a fellow cardiologist. In her free time, she enjoys playing the piano and horseback riding.
