= Sick Kids =

Sick Kids may refer to:

- Royal Hospital for Sick Children, Edinburgh, Scotland
- Royal Hospital for Children, Glasgow, Scotland
- The Hospital for Sick Children, Toronto, Canada

== See also ==
- List of children's hospitals
