= Paul E. Adolph =

American medical missionary

Paul Ernest Adolph
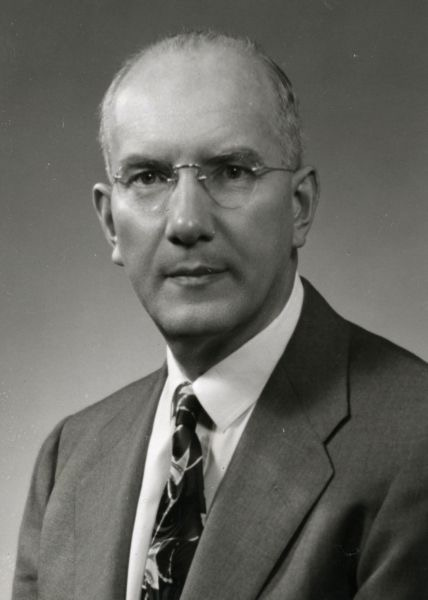
- Born: 4 August 1901; Philadelphia, Pennsylvania, United States
- Died: 17 June 1972 (aged 70); Ethiopia
- Education: Wheaton College, University of Pennsylvania
- Occupations: doctor, medical missionary
- Medical career
- Notable works: Surgery Speaks to China

Paul Ernest Adolph (August 4, 1901 – 17 June 1972) was an American medical missionary born in Philadelphia, Pennsylvania, United States. He served the China Inland Mission, now OMF International, from 1929 to 1941, then served in the US Army Medical Corps as a Major from 1941 to 1945. He returned to China to serve one last time from 1946 to 1949. After returning to the United States in 1949, Adolph worked preparing missionaries for overseas work and restoring their health after contracting diseases. Once retired, he served at his sons' hospitals in central Ethiopia and Bangladesh. He opened two hospitals in Luan, Shanxi and in Kaifeng, Henan and played a key role in the negotiations with Japanese military that kept hospitals open to Chinese populations during the Second Sino-Japanese War.

== Early life and education ==
Paul Adolph was born as the second son to Willhelma and William Adolph on August 4, 1901 in Philadelphia, Pennsylvania. He was younger brother to Edward (1895-1986) and William (1890-1958).

He was raised to speak German by his father, who had been an engraver in the Black Forest of Germany. He attended Central High School in Philadelphia and graduated in 1919 speaking English, German, Latin, Greek, and Hebrew. He began his undergraduate studies at the University of Pennsylvania but transferred to Wheaton College, where he graduated from in 1924 with a B.S. in chemistry and a B.A. in Greek.

Adolph studied medicine at the University of Pennsylvania School of Medicine, where he attempted to master as many specialties as he could in anticipation of not having specialists in the missionary field. When he became sick with tuberculosis at the end of his last year, the school awarded him his M.D. in 1927 despite him being sent to recover at Edward Livingston Trudeau's sanatorium in New York. While at the sanatorium, he recovered and eventually joined the medical staff, taking on responsibilities in patient care.

== Medical work ==
In 1929, Adolph left the United States for China with the China Inland Mission for the first time. When he arrived in Beijing, then Peking, he was able to visit his brother who was a professor of biochemistry there.

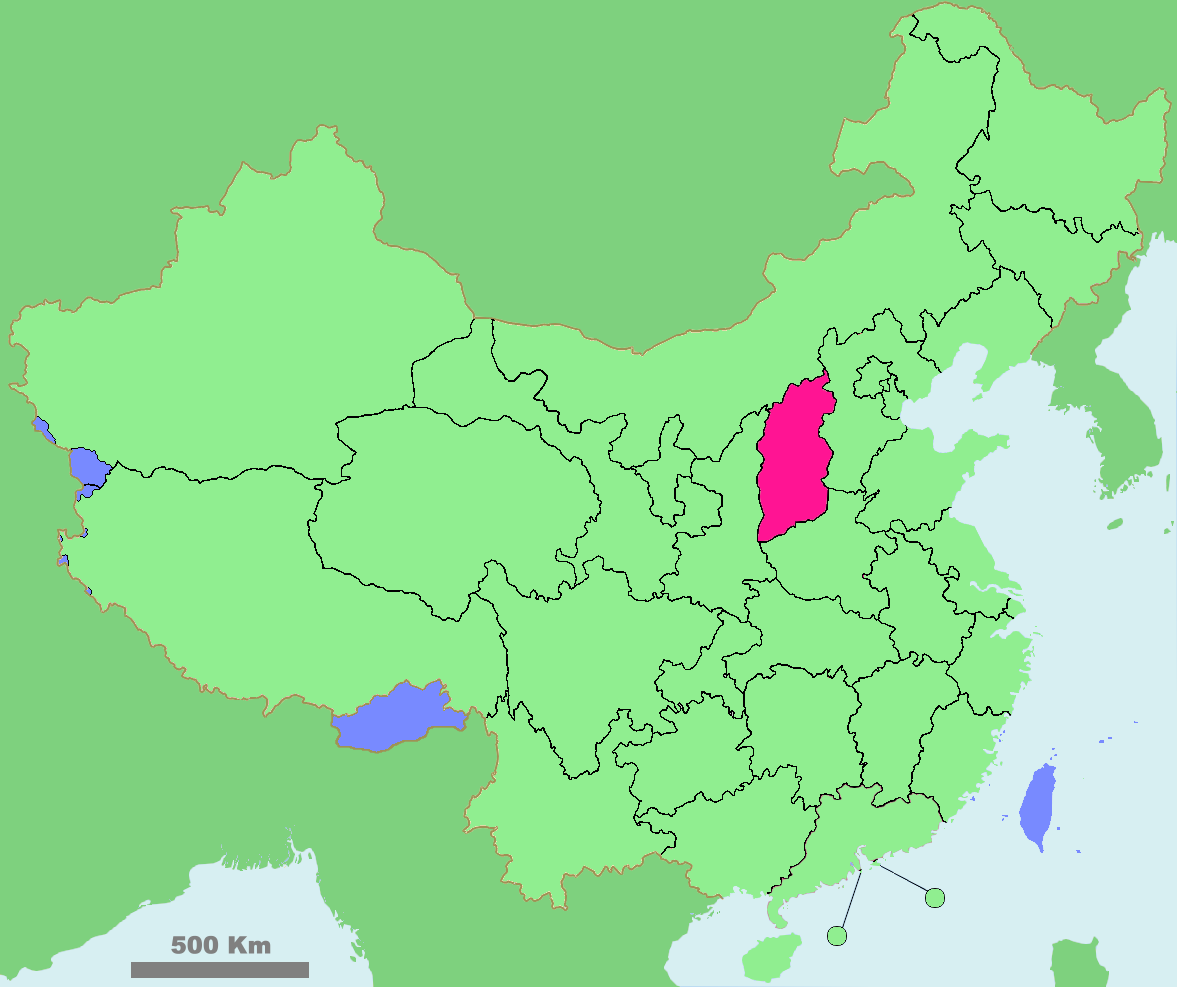
Shanxi, a province in northern China

After his arrival, he spent six months at a language school in the Anhui province studying the Chinese language. He then proceeded to his residency at a hospital in Linfen in the province of Shanxi. Following a year of residency, he was directed to open a 100-bed hospital in Luan, now Changzhi, in southeastern Shanxi. The missionaries that had previously worked in this region were no longer there as they had fled during the Boxer Rebellion.

At the hospital in Changzhi, Adolph was the only doctor and carried out mostly surgical procedures. Initially, he was received apprehensively and often called "foreign devil" by children. He and his team made efforts to integrate, such as wearing traditional Chinese clothing instead of American clothes. Patients at the hospital came from as far as 50 miles carried, walking, by wheelbarrow, or by cart. In his book Surgery Speaks to China, Adolph recounts having to treat many cases of tuberculosis due to unsanitary living conditions. Many patients' illnesses had progressed beyond treatment and amputations were necessary. He also operated to correct deformities such as cleft lips and cleft palates.

Adolph sought to improve sanitation through his practice. He encouraged midwives to use methods such as burning the umbilical cord to sever it, instead of using an unsanitary tool. He also provided bathtubs at the hospital for patients and the public to use.

He supported poor patients by charging low, fixed costs and providing them with housing while they recovered. He also toured rural areas to provide treatment, setting up clinics and operating theatres for surgeries.

In spring of 1936, after the birth of his second son, Adolph returned to the United States, where he took a year of graduate courses at the University of Pennsylvania School of Medicine. After this and a course in general surgery, he stayed to participate in research on sulfanilamide.

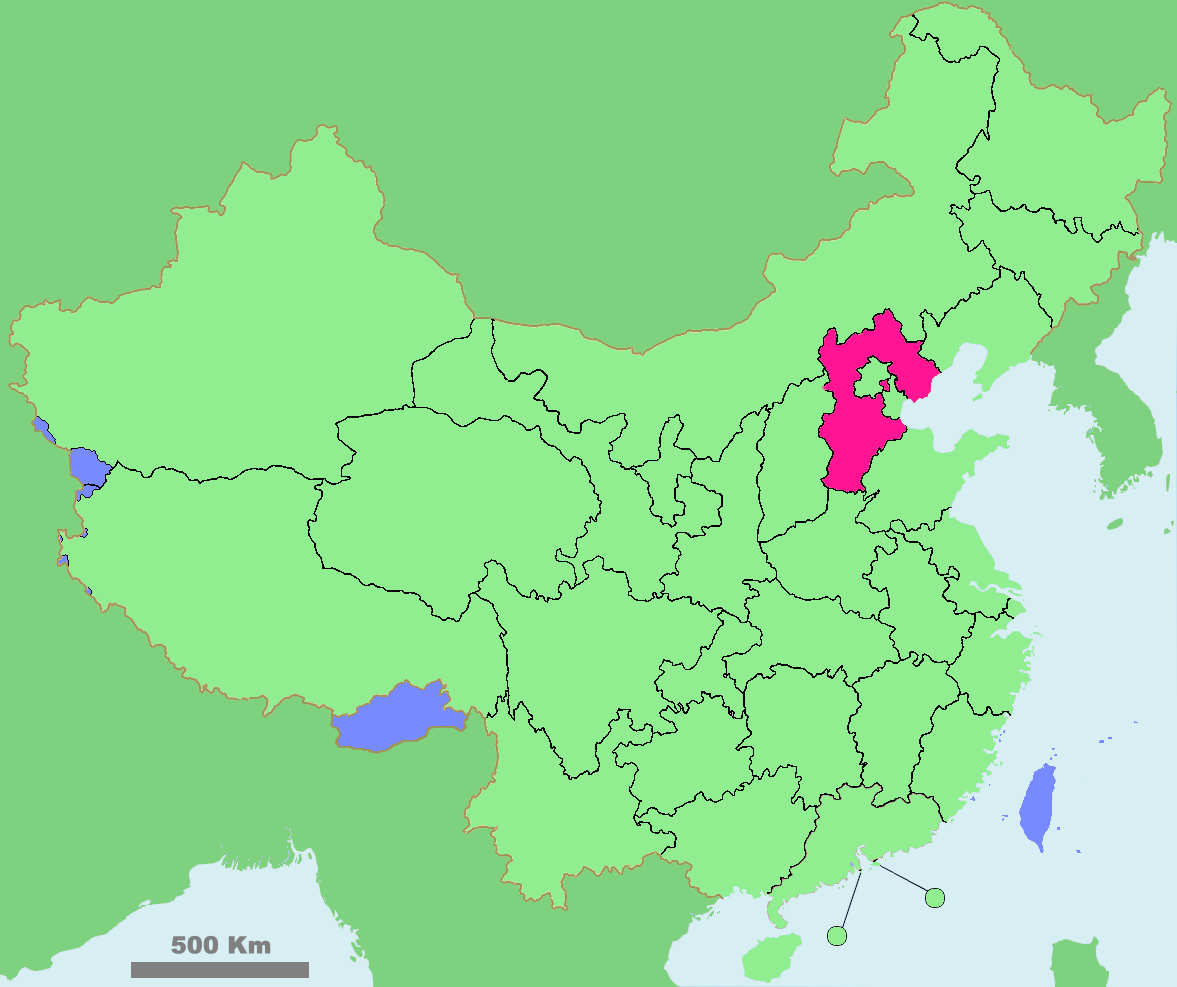
Hebei, a province in northern China

In November 1937, he returned to China and worked in Shunteh (Xingtai), Hebei because his return to Changzhi was delayed by the fighting of the Sino-Japanese war. There, he practiced mostly war medicine. He extensively used the delimiting tourniquet, later publishing a paper on its use in wartime China. In September 1938, he was able to return to Changzhi but without his family. That winter, he traveled to Liaochao to partner with the Red Cross in opening a hospital that needed a doctor.

In 1939, a reoccurrence of tuberculosis caused Adolph to return to his family in Chefoo (Yantai) for a five-month rest period. Afterwards, he intended to return to Changzhi, but the city had been overtaken by Japanese forces so he went to work at a hospital in Kaifeng instead. Here, he was free to practice as long as he cooperated with both Japanese and Chinese troops. He continued to practice there until he returned to the United States in 1941.

When in the United States, Adolph practiced in industrial surgery in Detroit and as an associate to another surgeon in private practice, before being commissioned to the Army Medical Corps. Major Adolph served in Scotland, France, and England as an army surgeon before being stationed at Fort Sheridan as Chief of Surgery in 1943. He was stationed in England again, where he served as a Chief of Surgical Service at a general hospital, and subsequently in France as a supervisor to eight German prisoner of war hospitals.

In August 1946, Adolph and his family returned to Shanghai to continue working with the China Inland Mission. He became the school physician for the Shanghai American School, a professor of surgery at the St. Johns Medical School, the director of the China Inland Mission's medical work in China, and the operator of a hospital in Shanghai. He also worked in a clinic for the poor operated in front of his own compound.

Upon returning to the United States, he practiced in Kentucky before being debilitated by a stroke and a third occurrence of tuberculosis in 1950. For twenty years he continued his involvement in the medical mission community in Chicago, preparing missionaries for working overseas and treating them after they contracted diseases abroad. After retirement, he practiced at his son Harold's mission hospital in Ethiopia and his son Robert's mission hospital in Bangladesh.

== Personal life ==
He married Vivian A. Adolph in June 1931 in Beijing and they honeymooned together in a nearby mountain range before being forced to evacuate due to war violence. They had two sons, Robert (born 14 December 1935) and Harold (born 11 December 1932), who followed in their father's footsteps and entered the mission field as doctors.

While serving in China, Adolph was curious about the history of Shen Nung, the father of Chinese medicine and divine husbandman. He made trips to the Taihang Mountain to explore the temple and speak to the monks.

== Later life and death ==
Toward the end of his career, Adolph spent time advising the China Inland Mission and working with his sons in the mission field. He accompanied his sons to sites in Ethiopia and Bangladesh, where they established hospitals. While working in Ethiopia, he died at the age of 70 in June 1972.

== Legacy ==
Adolph established the Sixth People's Hospital of Shanghai through his work with the China Inland Mission. Initially with only 100 beds, the hospital is now a 1,650-bed modern teaching hospital. While working in China during wartime, he was responsible for negotiating with both sides to continue providing medical care to communities caught in the fighting. He also assisted in founding his sons' hospitals in Bangladesh under the Sudan Interior Mission and southern Ethiopia.

In 1959, he was awarded the Distinguished Service to Society Award by Wheaton College, his alma mater.

== Publications ==
- Preoperative Measures Used in War Surgery in China with Special Reference to the Delimiting Tourniquet. Published in 1944
- Surgery Speaks to China. Published by China Inland Mission 1945
- Health Shall Spring Forth (Release From Tension). Published by Moody Press 1956
- Triumphant Living. Published by Moody Press 1959
- Missionary Health Manual. Published by: Moody Press 1964
- The Physical and Emotional Stress of Missionary Work. Published by Interdenominational Foreign Mission Association 1965
