= UKBB =

UKBB may refer to:

- UK Biobank
- University Children's Hospital Basel, an independent, university-based centre of competence for paediatric and juvenile medicine
- UKBB, the ICAO code for Boryspil International Airport, Kyiv, Ukraine
