= Shanghai General Hospital =

Geography
- Location: 100 Haining Road, Hongkou District (North Campus); 650 Xinsongjiang Road, Songjiang District (South Campus), Shanghai, China

Organisation
- Type: Public
- Religious affiliation: None; Daughters of Charity of Saint Vincent de Paul (historically), Franciscan Missionaries of Mary (historically)
- Affiliated university: Shanghai Jiao Tong University School of Medicine

Services
- Emergency department: Yes
- Beds: 1580 (de jure, as of 2013), 2000+ (de facto, as of 2013)

History
- Former name: Gongji Hospital
- Opened: 1864; 162 years ago

Links
- Website: eng.shgh.cn
- Other links: www.firsthospital.cn/index.html (in Chinese) www.shgh.cn/index.html (in Chinese)

Shanghai General Hospital is a Class A tertiary general hospital located in Shanghai, China.

== Names ==
The hospital was originally founded as General Hospital in Shanghai or Shanghai General Hospital. The hospital might not have had an official Chinese name until 1877, and a few common Chinese names include French Hospital (法国医院), Shanghai Public Hospital (上海公病院), and General Hospital (综合医院). In 1877, the Chinese name of the hospital was changed to Gongji Hospital (公济医院). In 1953, the Chinese name was again changed to Shanghai Municipal First People's Hospital (上海市立第一人民医院), and Shanghai First People's Hospital (上海市第一人民医院) in 1966. It was entitled Shanghai Red Cross Hospital (上海市红十字医院) in 1981, and the First People's Hospital affiliated with Shanghai Jiaotong University (上海交通大学附属第一人民医院) in 2002.

In English, its official name is still Shanghai General Hospital, although names such as Shanghai First People's Hospital are also used.

== History ==
=== Pre-Second Sino-Japanese War ===
In 1863, invited by the French consul in Shanghai, Catholic priest Mannus Desjacoues came forward as an agent to raise 50,000 taels of silver to build a hospital in Shanghai. The hospital opened in 1864. At the time, administration was in the hands of the Shareholders' Association, while day-to-day medical affairs were in the hands of the Catholic sisters of the Daughters of Charity of Saint Vincent de Paul. In addition, the hospital used to admit only expatriate patients and did not treat Chinese patients. The hospital was founded as a small hospital with only 35 beds.

In 1870, the Tianjin Massacre occurred and the situation in Shanghai became unstable, making the operation of the hospital very difficult for a while. As the lease was due to expire on December 31, 1876, the hospital management began to discuss the relocation of the hospital in September 1874 after the difficulties were overcome, with the initial director, F. B. Forbes, favoring Heard's Garden. In January 1875, newly appointed director William Keswick favored Endicott's Garden, although at that time the management was also considering purchasing land in Suzhou Creek for the hospital. In 1875, the hospital began negotiations with the Shanghai Municipal Council (SMC) to purchase land on the north bank of the Suzhou Creek outside the French Concession. The SMC agreed to the request and intended to place the hospital under the management of both the SMC and the Conseil D'Administration Municipale de la Concession Française de Changhai (authority of the French Concession), yet the French were initially reluctant in order to maintain a certain degree of independence. In the end, they simply could not afford to run the hospital and eventually compromised. In 1877, the hospital relocated and was given an official Chinese name.

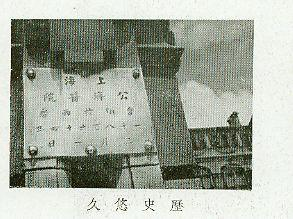
Doorway sign for the hospital, early 1900s

After the hospital moved, it grew rapidly in size, and the Congregation of the Mission purchased additional land near the hospital to build convents. Thereafter, as the Daughters of Charity was appointed to take over the Sainte Marie Hospital, they were unable to manage the hospital, despite an overall increase in manpower in Shanghai. In September 1913, the Franciscan Missionaries of Mary took over the hospital. After the relocation of the hospital, the management was transferred to the board of trustees, which was dominated by the SMC. In 1884, an isolation ward was established, and the hospital served as a foreign isolation hospital for the Settlement until 1900, when the Foreign Isolation Hospital was built. After purchasing the land to the east of the hospital in February 1890, wards, morgues, and autopsy rooms were constructed.

In 1937, the hospital began hiring Chinese female nurses.

=== During the Second Sino-Japanese War and the Civil War ===
On August 13, 1937, Japan attacked Shanghai, and the SMC attempted to take a neutral stance. In November, Shanghai was occupied by Japan, and Stirling Fessenden, on behalf of the SMC, formally announced that the SMC to be neutral, and that it would treat the rights and interests of both the Chinese and the Japanese in the Settlement on the same footing. However, by early 1938, the Japanese had forced the SMC to agree to have Japanese police officers manage Hongkou.

Director G. Charnbers and the sisters transferred 70 patients to the Henry Lester Institute for Medical Research, while the rest of the staff took refuge in the relative safety of the French Concession, which was not occupied by the Japanese. During the same period, the hospital was bombed by the Japanese, but there were no casualties because the staff had already evacuated. After the fighting in Shanghai ended, the hospital began to allow Chinese soldiers and patients to enter the hospital for treatment. In 1940, the Japanese arrested one hospital manager J. C. Burges for "collaborating with the enemy". The Japanese had been trying to take control of the hospital, and hospital equipment was looted and vandalized by the Japanese during this period, and medicinal materials were stolen and sold.

The Pacific War broke out in December 1941 with the Japanese attacking on Pearl Harbor, and Japan formally declared war on the United States and British Empire. The Japanese occupied the International Settlement through the Suzhou Creek and took control of the SMC; however, since the French Concession belonged to Vichy France at this time, the Japanese did not occupy it. In 1943, Vichy France transferred the Concession to the Reorganized National Government of the Republic of China, a puppet state of Japan, so that both Concessions were in fact under Japanese jurisdiction. However, due to the complexity of the ownership of the hospital, the Japanese were not able to take full control of the hospital, although the hospital was commandeered by the Imperial Japanese Navy for a time on the eve of the end of the war.

After the Sino-Japanese War, the Nationalist Government took back the Shanghai International Settlement and the Shanghai French Concession. The British and French administrations of the hospital initially refused to return the hospital to the Nationalist Government, but compromised after efforts by Zhu Yanggao, Yu Songyun, and K. C. Wu. The name of the hospital remained unchanged after the handover, but was fully open to the Chinese.

=== After the Civil War ===
In May 1949, communist troops entered Shanghai. on June 3, the Shanghai Military Control Committee took over the hospital. November 10, 1952, the Shanghai Municipal Health Bureau issued a notice, Gongji Hospital was renamed Shanghai Municipal First People's Hospital. In 1956, the Department of Traditional Chinese Medicine was established. In 1966, the Chinese name was changed again to Shanghai First People's Hospital. In 1992, the hospital was recognized as a Class A tertiary general hospital.

== Services ==
=== Locations ===
The hospital has two main campuses located at 100 Haining Road, Hongkou District (North Campus) and 650 Xinsongjiang Road, Songjiang District (South Campus). As of 2013, the two main hospitals cover an area of 94,775 square meters, with more than 4,000 staffs, 1,580 approved beds, and more than 2,000 actual open beds, making it one of the largest hospitals in Shanghai.

=== Affiliations ===
The hospital cooperates with Shanghai Jiao Tong University, Shanghai Public Health Bureau and Shanghai Municipal People's Government.
