= William Lockhart (surgeon) =

Protestant Christian missionary

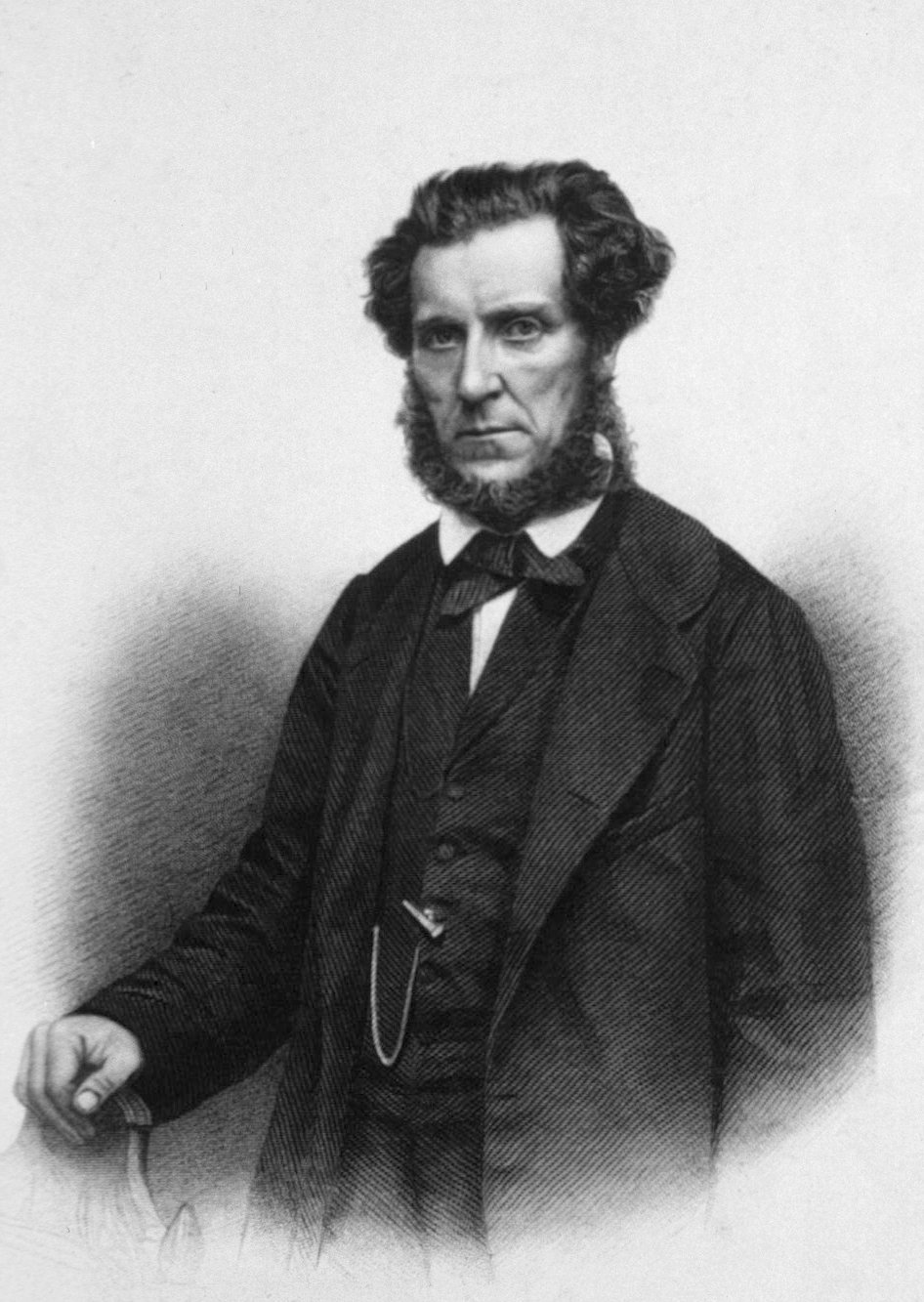
- Medical missionary to China
- Born: 3 October 1811; Liverpool, England
- Died: 29 April 1896 (aged 84); Blackheath, England

William Lockhart (3 October 1811 – 29 April 1896) was a Protestant Christian missionary who served with the London Missionary Society during the late Qing Dynasty in China. In 1844, he founded the first western hospital in Shanghai, which was known as the Chinese Hospital. The hospital is named Renji Hospital now, which is one of the most famous hospitals in China.

== Biography ==
William Lockhart

Lockhart was born in Liverpool and received medical training at Meath Hospital in Dublin and Guy's Hospital in London. He then worked in Liverpool for three years. In 1834, he became a member of the Royal College of Surgeons of England and later of the London Missionary Society (LMS). With the LMS, in 1838 he travelled to Canton, and then to Macau and Shanghai, where he stayed intermittently from 1842 to 1863. He opened a hospital in Shanghai.

In 1841, he married Catherine Parkes in Macau. Her brother was Sir Harry Parkes, British Envoy to Japan and China.

In 1857, he became a Fellow of the Royal College of Surgeons.

In 1861, Lockhart published a book titled The medical missionary in China: a narrative of twenty years' experience, where among other things he insisted that one should not serve both as a preacher and a physician.

He returned to England in 1864 and opened a practice in Kent. That same year saw him became director of the LMS. In 1878 he became the first President of the Medical Missionary Association.

The papers of William Lockhart are held by SOAS Archives.
