= Henry Lester =

British architect (1840–1926)

Henry Lester (1840–1926) was a British architect, merchant and philanthropist in Shanghai.

== Birth and life in Britain ==
Lester was born in Southampton in 1840 as the youngest of four brothers. After finishing his university studies, he returned to Southampton with a bachelor's degree in architecture. Unluckily, all of his brothers died of an unknown disease. One doctor told him that he should leave his homeland, so Lester departed Southampton with sadness and disconsolation. Henry took a cargo ship to Shanghai with another Briton, Gordon Morris, who afterwards became his partner.

== Early years in Shanghai ==
Lester arrived in Shanghai in 1867, and worked for the Shanghai Municipal Council for three years. Then he attended Shanghai Real Estate Agency, which was opened by the American businessman Edwin Smith, and he became a main shareholder of the agency. After Smith's retirement, Lester's own company, Lester, Johnson & Morris (Chinese: 德和洋行), took over all the assets of Shanghai Real Estate Agency and Lester became one of the richest merchants in Shanghai. He was also a devout Christian Puritan..

== Mr. Lester and his company ==
According to the stipulation of Shanghai Municipal Council, staff members could not participate in its main business services and trade activities. Henry opened its own company, Lester. H, until the expiration of his contract. His compatriots Gordon Morris, George A. Johnson became shareholders together afterward. They renamed the company 'Lester, Johnson & Morris' and the Chinese name was kept as before. It became one of the most well-known architect offices. It is hard to know how many architectures did this office design and construct.

== Main architectures ==
- Sincere Department Store, Shanghai Branch (No.646, East Nanjing Road) 1917
- Nissin Building (No. 5, the Bund) 1921
- Puyi Building (No.110, Middle Sichuan Road) 1922
- North China Daily News Building (No.17, the Bund) 1924
- Bank of Taiwan Building (No. 16, the Bund) 1926
- Renji Hospital (No.145, Shandong Road) 1932
- Henry Lester Institute of Technical Education (No.505, Changzhi Road) 1934
- Mitsubishi Bank Building (No.85, Guangdong Road) 1936
- Jialing Office Building (No.346, Middle Sichuan Road) 1937
- The Henry Lester Institute of Medical Research (No. 1314 West Beijing Road, Shanghai) 1926.

Most of them are historic architectures in Shanghai.

== Heritage ==
Mr. Henry Lester bequeathed most of his assets to establish and endow the Henry Lester Trust Limited, which support Chinese Students study in UK.

The Henry Lester Institute of Medical Research was built according to his will. The relics of the institute in Shanghai was recently refurbished and will be used a site of the United Family Healthcare Shanghai (Jing'an).
