= Stollery Children's Hospital =

Hospital in Edmonton, Alberta, Canada

- Alberta Health Services
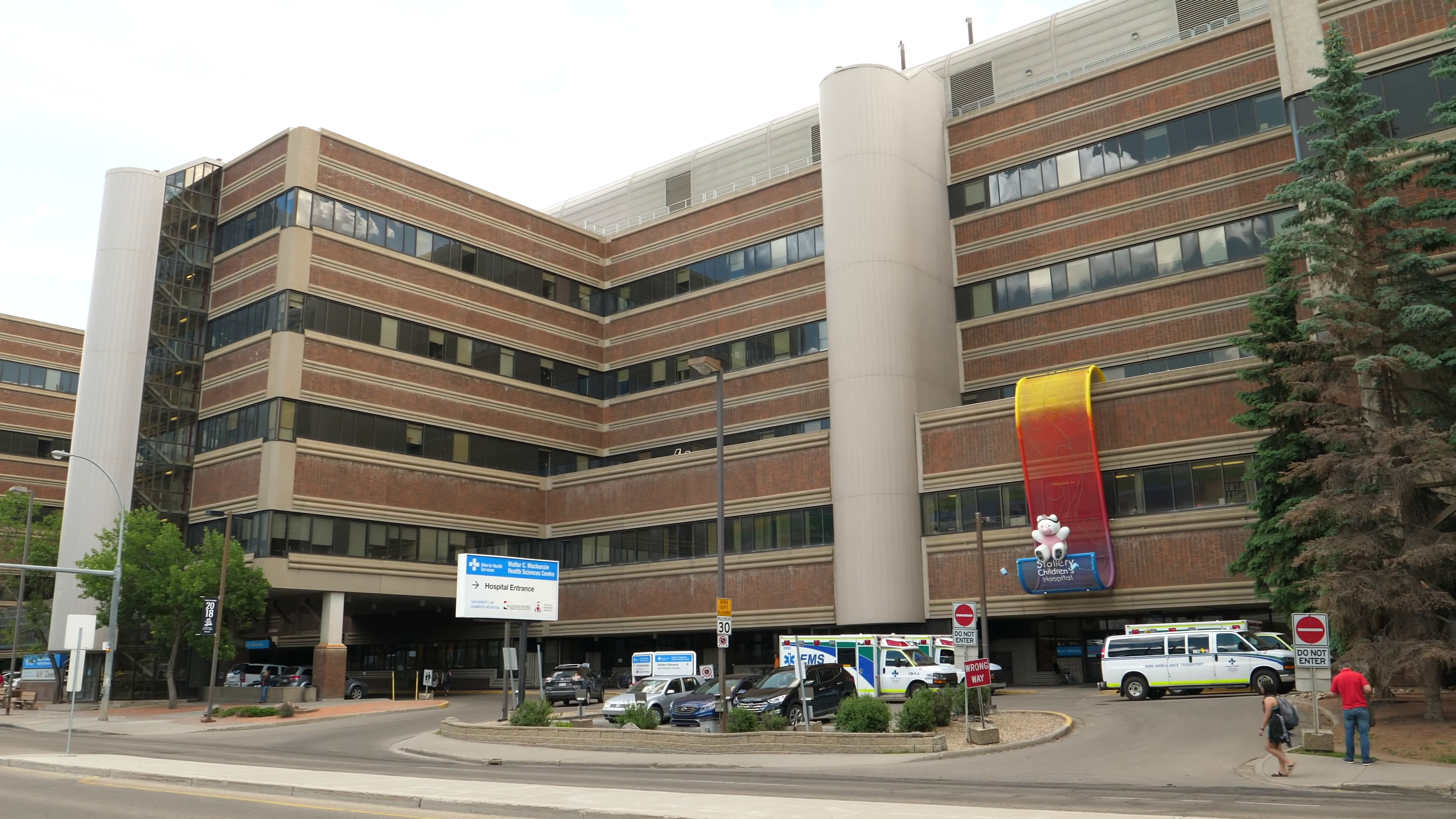

- Location in Edmonton

Geography
- Location: 8215 112 Street; Edmonton, Alberta; T6G 2C8
- Coordinates: 53.520556°N 113.524722°W

Organisation
- Care system: Medicare
- Type: Children's
- Affiliated university: University of Alberta

Services
- Emergency department: Yes, Level 1 Paediatric Trauma Centre
- Beds: 218

Helipads
- Helipad: TC LID: CEW7

History
- Founded: 2001

Links
- Website: albertahealthservices.ca/stollery

The Stollery Children's Hospital is a 218 bed children's hospital that opened in October 2001. It is a "hospital within a hospital," being situated within the University of Alberta Hospital and co-located with Mazankowski Alberta Heart Institute in the Walter C. Mackenzie Health Sciences Centre in Edmonton, Alberta, Canada.

The hospital, which was run by Capital Health before being merged in 2008 into Alberta Health Services, is named for Bob and Shirley Stollery, who provided the original donation which helped with the creation of the hospital.

== History ==
The Northern Alberta Children's Hospital Foundation was created in 1978 with the intention of having a specific children's hospital built in Edmonton. The foundation was a backer of the Child Health program and in 1992, the name was changed to Children's Health Foundation of Northern Alberta to better show their support. Later, after the hospital opened, the name was changed to the current "Stollery Children's Hospital Foundation".

Around 1989, after consultations with paediatricians and other interested residents of Edmonton, Bob and Shirley Stollery gave the donation that kicked off the campaign to build a state of the art hospital. The campaign, which was run by the foundation, was successful in raising over $10 million.

At the time, it was recognised that a free standing hospital would not be economically viable, requiring, in addition to construction costs, a large maintenance and operations budget. It was decided that the hospital would be built within the grounds of the University of Alberta's Walter C. Mackenzie Health Sciences Centre and co-exist with the University of Alberta Hospital. Originally known as the Stollery Children's Health Centre, the name was later changed to the Stollery Children's Hospital to reinforce the fact that it is completely separate and independent of the University of Alberta Hospital.

In February 2001, doctors at the Stollery were able to successfully revive Erika Nordby, a 13-month-old child who was hypothermic. Nordby had wandered outside, where the temperature was about −24 °C (−11 °F), wearing only a diaper, and collapsed in a snow bank. When the girl was found, sometime after 3 am, her body temperature was 16 °C (61 °F) and she had no pulse. Paramedics were called but could not revive her while transporting her to the hospital. After about 90 minutes, doctors were able to get her heart operating again; in total, she had spent about two hours clinically dead.

== Services ==
The hospital is noted as a "centre for specialized paediatric services", as well as being the referral centre for paediatric cardiac surgery in Western Canada and for organ transplants. The hospital contains a neonatal intensive care unit, a paediatric intensive care unit with an Extra Corporeal Membrane Oxygenation (ECMO) program, a Paediatric Thrombosis Program and multiple other clinics geared towards children.

Biomedical engineers at the hospital developed the Sub-Arctic Intelligent Neonatal Transport Incubator (SAINT). This is a neonatal incubator designed to operate in temperatures below freezing where other incubators are unsuitable. It is used throughout Alberta, British Columbia, the Northwest Territories and Nunavut.

The hospital is part of the Canadian Neonatal Network, an organization composed of neonatologists and neonatal health professionals from across Canada.

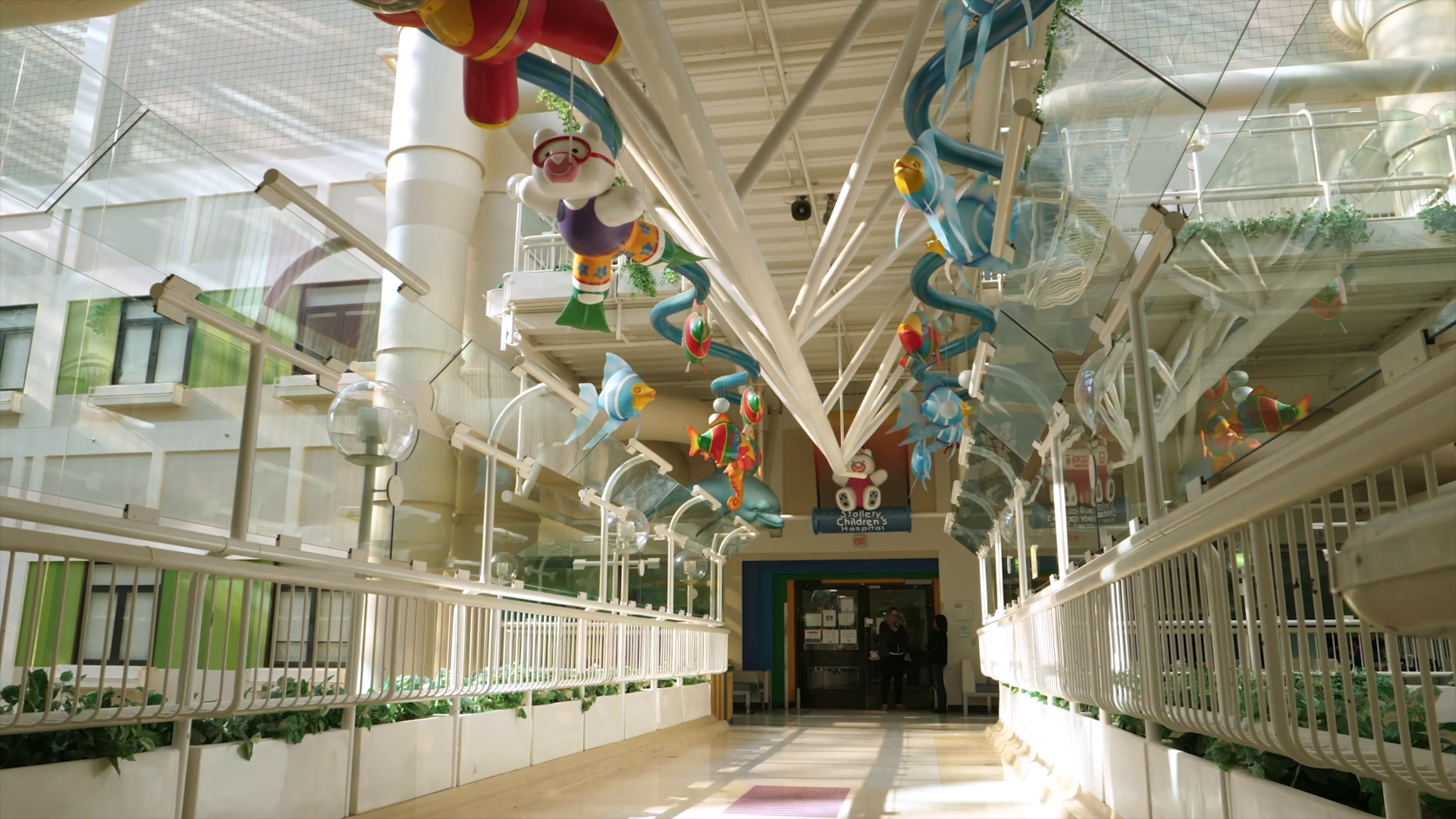
A walkway in Stollery Children's Hospital

The Stollery was the first hospital in Western Canada to have the ECMO device, a paediatric thrombosis program, replace a valve in a child's heart without having to undergo surgery and perform paediatric surgery to do an intestinal transplant. The Stollery was the first hospital in Canada to perform open heart surgery and deliver a baby at the same time, and the first to perform the first paediatric auto-islet transplant. It is the site of Canada's Pediatric Centre for Weight and Health. It is also a major North American referral centre for the ventricular assist device known as the Berlin Heart.

The board is made up of a president and CEO, Mike House; chair, Marshall Sadd; vice-chair, Richard Kirby; fifteen members of the board of trustees, including Ray Muzyka, an investor, entrepreneur, physician and co-founder of BioWare; and four ex-officio members.

== Fundraising ==
The Stollery is a member of the Children's Miracle Network Hospitals, an international nonprofit organization that raises funds for children's hospitals, medical research and community awareness of children's health issues. They also raise money by holding community and foundation events along with suggested donation ideas.

Some notable fundraising includes the village of Waskatenau with their softball marathons. In 2012, Curtis Hargrove of Cold Lake, Alberta started a run across Canada from Newfoundland to British Columbia with the goal of raising $1 million for the hospital. CFMG-FM, 1049 Virgin Radio, has broadcast live from the hospital. Daryl Katz of Katz Group of Companies and owner of the Edmonton Oilers has made substantial donations to the hospital. The Hair Massacure, a mass head shaving, is an annual event that raises money for charity, including the Stollery. EvelineCharles Salons and Spas, owned and operated by Eveline Charles, is a supporter of the Stollery, as is Ronald McDonald House Charities Canada. Singer Samantha King has performed benefit concerts for the Michael Cuccione Children's Health Foundation which raises funds for the Stollery. Between 2003 and 2016, Stollery patient Braden Mole fundraised $1 million for the Stollery by hosting annual barbecues and silent auctions in his hometown of Edson, Alberta.

== See also ==
- Samantha's Law
- List of children's hospitals
- List of hospitals in Alberta
- Children's Hospital
