= Erika Nordby =

Canadian child survivor of hypothermia

Erika Nordby (born February 2000), also known as Baby Erika, Miracle Baby and Canada's Miracle Child, is a Canadian originally from Edmonton, Alberta known for having been revived after spending two hours without a heartbeat due to hypothermia. Nordby, then a 13-month-old toddler, had left her heated house nearly naked, while the air temperature was −24 °C (−11 °F).

== Freezing ==
Erika and her mother, 26-year-old Leyla Nordby, were spending the night of 22/23 February 2001 at a friend's home in Edmonton. Leyla and an unnamed friend had been out earlier in the night, leaving a relative of the friend to babysit. When the two returned to the home, the babysitter left through the back door, which had a broken latch. In the early hours of the morning, 13-month-old Erika left the house alone wearing only a diaper. The temperature outside was approximately −24 °C (−11 °F). As the girl customarily had a bottle around 2 am, her mother became concerned when she awoke at 3 am and Erika was not beside her in bed. Leyla found her in a snowbank shortly thereafter by following footprints leading away from the back door. She brought Erika inside and called an ambulance, and attempted CPR and mouth-to-mouth resuscitation, but was unsuccessful. Paramedics were unable to intubate at the scene due to Erika's condition. Erika was taken to Stollery Children's Health Centre. Leyla was detained by police for five hours on suspicion of child neglect, after which she went to the hospital.

Upon her arrival at Stollery, Erika was considered to be clinically dead: she had been without a pulse for approximately two hours. She had no vital signs and had a core body temperature of about 16 °C (61 °F). This compares to a normal body temperature of 37 °C (99 °F); the lowest survived human body temperature resulting from accidental (not medically controlled) hypothermia was 13.7 °C (56.7 °F).

Erika's heart resumed beating after she was placed under a warming blanket. Doctors suggested the cold had placed her into a hibernation-like state, protecting her body from serious damage. There were initially suggestions that parts of her hands or feet might need to be amputated because of damage from frostbite, but this was later considered unnecessary. Erika required skin grafts on her foot and physiotherapy to enable her to walk again.

== Aftermath ==
Erika was released from hospital after six weeks. She became known as a "miracle baby" and was featured in media worldwide. She suffered no permanent damage except for scarring and slight deformation of her left foot, initially requiring specialized footwear. Over C$5500 was raised from donors to pay for her medical expenses and education, and she was also sent toys and hundreds of cards and letters.

Although Leyla was never formally charged, she became a subject of intense media scrutiny because of her aboriginal ethnicity and her social circumstances. She and her family, including Erika, moved away from Edmonton to avoid the media attention, though she accepted interview requests on the one-year and ten-year anniversaries of the event.

A civil suit was filed on Erika's behalf against the landlord and tenants of the building that she had been staying in the night she was frozen. The suit sought C$101,000 in damages and compensation because the defendants were aware of but failed to correct the faulty latch on the door that Erika had used. The province of Alberta also sued these defendants, seeking compensation for the costs of Erika's health care.

== Legacy ==
Erika's story was recounted in the song "Erika Nordby (Canada's Miracle Child)" by Canadian artist Stompin' Tom Connors, released on his album Stompin' Tom Sings Canadian History; the song described how Erika "captured the world with her smile". The incident was also discussed in a government report about "mothering under duress", which called Erika a "legend". She was the subject of an episode of Life's Little Miracles, a TV show on Discovery Health Channel, and was mentioned in an episode of Nova on PBS titled "Making Stuff Colder".

Erika's experience was mentioned as one indication of the medical relevance of a Fred Hutchinson Cancer Research Center study on "anoxia-induced suspended animation" in zebrafish.
