= Zhongshan Hospital =

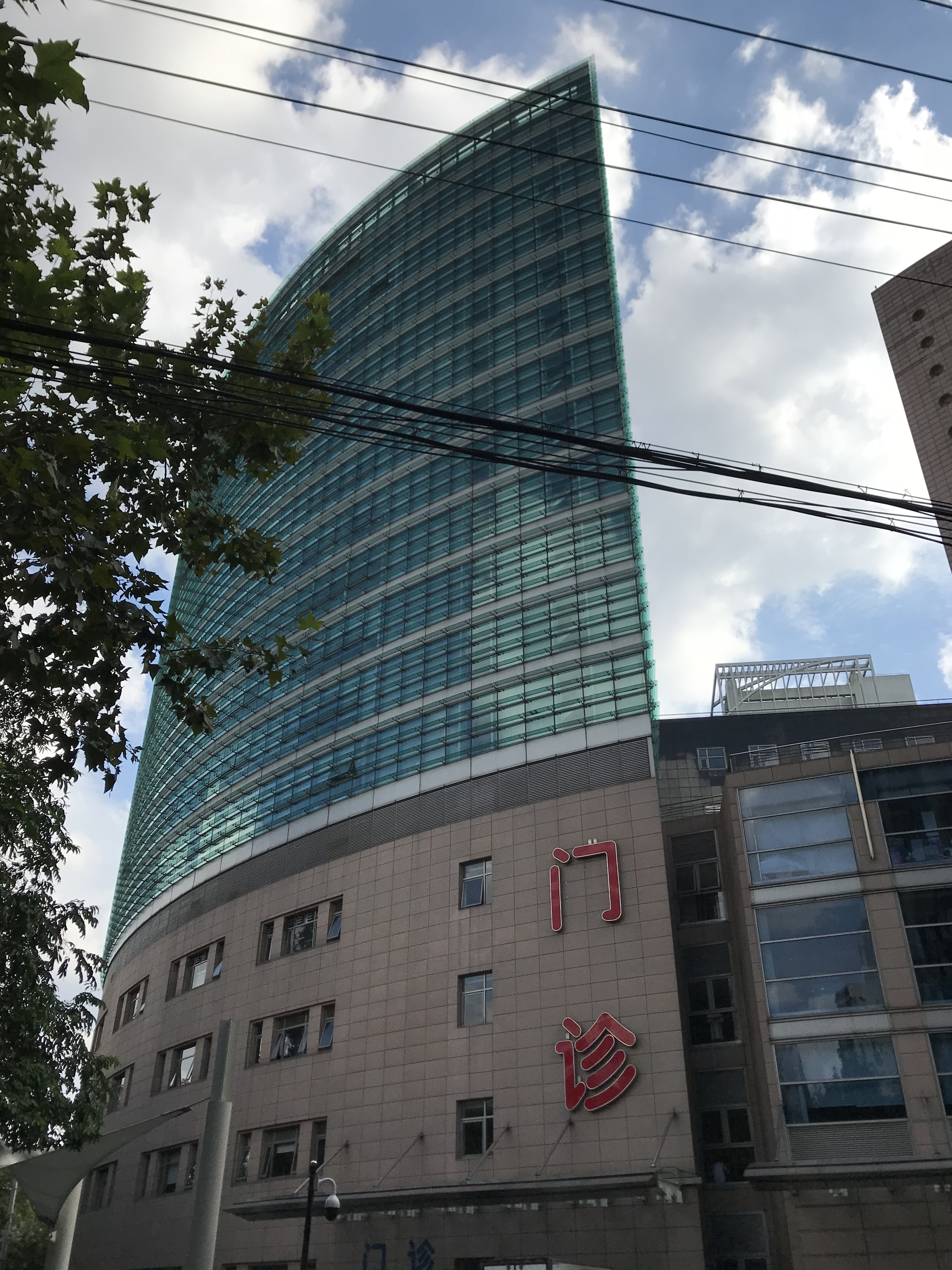

Geography
- Location: Xuhui District, Shanghai, China
- Coordinates: 31.20899°N 121.42258°E

Organisation
- Type: Teaching
- Affiliated university: Shanghai Medical College of Fudan University

Services
- Emergency department: Yes

History
- Founded: 1935

Links
- Website: www.zs-hospital.sh.cn
- Lists: Hospitals in China

Zhongshan Hospital (simplified Chinese: 中山医院; traditional Chinese: 中山醫院), formerly Chung Shan Memorial Hospital, is a major teaching hospital in Shanghai, China, affiliated with the Shanghai Medical College of Fudan University.

== History ==
The hospital was built in 1935 and officially opened on 1 April 1937 as one of the largest Chinese-owned hospitals in Shanghai. Its name commemorates President Sun Yat-Sen (Sun Zhongshan). The director of the hospital's preparatory committee was H. H. Kung, and Sun Fo, the son of Sun Yat-sen, served as vice director. Niu Huisheng (牛惠生) was appointed as the hospital's first president. The family of Shi Liangcai made significant donations to establish a nursing school in the hospital.

== Facilities ==
Zhongshan Hospital is a major teaching hospital affiliated with the Shanghai Medical College of Fudan University and was named one of China's "100 Best Hospitals" in 1999.

The hospital covers an area of 96,000 square metres (1,030,000 sq ft) and has 358,000 square metres (3,850,000 sq ft) of buildings. It has 2,005 beds serving 100,000 inpatients and four million outpatients and emergencies each year. There are three branches located at 1474 Yan'an Road, Xuhui District, Tianma Hill, Songjiang District, and Qingpu District. It has more than 4,000 employees, including more than 600 professor-level physicians, two members of the Chinese Academy of Sciences and two members of the Chinese Academy of Engineering.

The hospital includes all clinical specialties except pediatrics. It has been designated as the Shanghai Clinical Center for Cardiovascular Diseases and Liver Cancer. Having their head offices set up in the hospital, the Shanghai Institute of Cardiovascular Diseases, the Liver Cancer Institute of Fudan University, the Institute of Vascular Surgery of Fudan University and the Nuclear Medicine Institute of Fudan University have become the major research centers of the hospital. The Organ Transplantation Center, Fudan University, is another feature of the hospital.

== List of presidents ==
- Niu Huisheng
- Ying Yuanyue
- Shen Kefei
- Huang Jiasi
- Cui Zhiyi
- Lin Zhaoqi
- Qiu Lin
- Wang Chengpei
- Lin Gui
- Yang Binghui
- Wang Yuqi
- Fan Jia (incumbent)

== See also ==
- Feng You-xian, vascular surgeon
