= Burlo Garofolo Pediatric Institute =

Coordinates: 45.634946°N 13.785933°E

Geography
- Location: Trieste, Italy

Organisation
- Type: Specialist, Children Hospital

Links
- Lists: Hospitals in Italy

The Burlo Garofolo Pediatric Institute (Italian: Ospedale Infantile Burlo Garofolo) is a children's hospital located in Trieste, Italy.

According to “THE” (Times Higher Education), Burlo Garofolo is the 1st institute in Italy and the 28th in the world for scientific research quality.

Since 1992 the Unit for Health Services Research and International Cooperation acts as WHO Collaborating Centre for Maternal and Child Health with the following terms of reference:

- development and evaluation of appropriate technologies for health care during pregnancy, the newborn period, infancy and childhood;
- development and validation of guidelines and training materials and modules;
- support to the implementation of WHO programmes in low and middle income Countries. Furthermore, the Institute collaborates with the World Bank (Children and Youth Unit) for guidelines on early investments in health and education and with the UNIDO Institute for Science and Technology for telemedicine programs with developing Countries.

The institute is also a member of the Consortium for Biomedicine which is located in the AREA Science Park of Trieste, gathers international and national biotechnology research centers and offers facilities for Biomedical Research, such as molecular imaging and production of nanovectors.

== History ==
The Burlo Garofolo was established in 1856 to ensure medical care to poor children. In 1968 the institute was designated by the Ministry of Health as IRCCS. Since the late '70, the institute has promoted at both national and international level innovative policies.

== International relationships ==
The institute has a wide network of international collaborating institutions with activities including: research and development, training programs, exchange of research fellows.

- Europe
  - WHO Collaborating Center for reference and research on influenza - National Institute for Medical Research "The Ridgeway", London, UK;
  - Department of Obstetrics and Gynaecology, University of Lund, Malmö, Sweden;
  - Paediatrics Clinics and Paediatrics Surgery, University of Graz, Austria;
  - Clinic of Pediatric Surgery, UK Muenster, Germany;
  - Cognitive Sciences Lab, Cochin - Port-Royal Medical School, Paris V University, France;
  - Institute of Medical Technology and Medical School, University of Tampere, Finland;
  - Department of Pediatric Surgery, University Hospital Riga, Latvia and Timişoara, Romania;
  - Center for Reproductive Medicine, UZ-Brussel, Vrije Universiteit Brussel, Brussels, Belgium;
  - Reproductive Medicine Unit, Department of Obstetrics and Gynecology, University of Ljubljana, Slovenia.
- U.S.A.
  - Department of Pediatrics, University of Maryland, Baltimore;
  - Department of Pediatrics, University of Chicago;
  - H. Hughes Medical Institute and Dept. of Genetics and Medicine, Yale University, New Haven;
  - Department of Molecular Virology and Microbiology, Baylor College of Medicine, Houston.

== Research activity ==
The research activity is articulated in 5 main areas:

- Materno-foetal medicine and neonatology
- Chronic diseases with onset in paediatric age
- Pediatric surgery and rehabilitation
- Epidemiology, prevention and quality of care
- Pediatric neuro sciences
  - Materno-foetal medicine and neonatology

This area covers research on: the immunology of pregnancy, with the goal of clarifying mechanisms of phenomena such as sterility and poliabortivity; assisted reproduction, looking at methodological standardization and new approaches to reduce maternal and foetal complications such as ovarian hyperstimulation or multiple twins; ovarian and spermatozoa cryopreservation in order to increase likelihood of pregnancy and to preserve couple fertility; genetic and apoptosis of human gametes to investigate in vitro micromanipulation risks; thromboembolic risk in pregnancy and labour; bacterial vaginosis and vertically-transmitted infectious diseases; prenatal diagnosis including US imaging, cytogenetics and molecular genetics; prevention of prematurity; evaluation of foetal growth during pregnancy and well-being during labour; neonatologists have developed and disseminated innovative approaches for the care of very low birth-weight babies; current research efforts focus on pharmacogenomics of steroids, analgesia in term and pre-term babies and pain assessment.

  - Chronic diseases with onset in paediatric age

The institute plays a leading role in the research on the molecular and immunological bases and identification of diagnostic markers of coeliac disease and of chronic inflammatory bowel disease. Research in this area also covers rare genetic diseases, particularly glycogenosis type II, storage diseases (Gaucher, Niemann Pick and other sphingolipidoses) mitochondrial diseases and genetic immunodeficiencies such as IPEX syndrome, aiming at clarifying molecular mechanisms and develop innovative approaches to treatment such as enzyme replacement, use of nanotechnologies for genetic correction and stem cells transplantation. Research is also devoted to autoimmune diseases and paediatric rheumatology with focus on clinical evaluation of innovative therapies such as biological drugs; improved therapeutic protocols for leukemias and solid tumors are sought through multicentric trials and the study of pharmacogenetic determinants of outcome; the study of opportunistic infections and virology in paediatric cancer and transplanted patients.

  - Paediatric surgery and rehabilitation

This area covers the development and evaluation of mini-invasive and automated surgical approaches to abdominal, thoracic and urological surgery, and of micro-surgery approaches including prenatal interventions; the diagnosis and management of osteoarticular and ocular complications of metabolic and other systemic diseases; the early markers of surgical complications; the evaluation of rehabilitation approaches of amblyopia; the management of dental problems in children with special needs; the genetics of hearing disorders and tissue engineering for surgical repair .

  - Epidemiology, prevention and quality of care

Research in this area is focused on the epidemiology of disease in pregnancy, infancy, childhood and adolescence, including infectious diseases and environmental exposure; on the development and implementation of approaches, (such as the Charter for Child Rights in Hospital), to assess and improve the quality of care particularly in the hospital setting; on integrated approaches for children with chronic diseases and children with special needs, including home care; on the development and evaluation of policies to promote breastfeeding; on the development and implementation of child health indicators and child health policies at international level; on bioethics of decision making in the perinatal period.

  - Paediatric neuro sciences

This area focuses on the genetic basis of intellectual disability, the neurophysiology of epilepsy and neuropsychology, focusing on specific developmental disorders such as dyslexia, dysgraphia and coordination disorders and exploring new approaches for the rehabilitation of learning disabilities and language disorders. A recently established kinematic lab analyses upper limb movements and foetal movements, with the purpose of early diagnosis and possibly intervention. Finally, the physiopathology of neurological damage in mitochondrial encephalomyopathies is explored.

== See also ==
- List of children's hospitals
- Trieste
- University of Trieste
