= Hair Massacure =

The Hair Massacure, sometimes referred to as the St. Valentine's Day Hair Massacure, is a mass head-shave in Alberta, Canada, raising funds to support children with life-threatening illnesses, along with cancer research.

The first event was held on February 14, 2003 with 48 participants, and raised $37,000. In 2006, organizers introduced pink hair to the event, as a way to bring more awareness to the fundraiser. Guinness World Records archive contains Hair Massacure’s record of the most heads shaved under one roof in a 24-hour period, set in 2006.

The 2010 and 2011 Alberta Hair Massacure events each had over 1,500 participants and in 2010 the event raised over one million dollars. In 2014, there were over 2,000 participants and over $1.4 million was raised. The money is distributed to Make-A-Wish Northern Alberta, Stollery Children's Hospital Foundation, and between 2011 and 2014, to the Ronald McDonald House Northern Alberta.

There are smaller Hair Massacures that take place all over Canada, for example the Make-A-Wish: Queen's University Branch's Hair Massacure in Kingston, Ontario. This Hair Massacure took place on February 11, 2012 at the Cataraqui Town Centre Mall in Kingston and its goal was to raise $25,000 and have 100 participants cutting, shaving, or colouring their hair pink for the event. Now the event is referred to as HaiRaiser.
