= Huang Jiasi =

Chinese surgeon and politician

- Born: July 14, 1906; Yushan, Jiangxi, China
- Died: May 14, 1984 (aged 77); Beijing, China
- Education: Yenching University; Peking Union Medical College; University of Michigan
- Medical career
- Institutions: Peking Union Medical College Hospital; Zhongshan Hospital (Shanghai); Shanghai Chest Hospital
- Sub-specialties: Cardiothoracic Surgery

Huang Jiasi (simplified Chinese: 黄家驷; traditional Chinese: 黃家駟; Wade–Giles: Huang Chia-ssu; July 14, 1906 – May 14, 1984) was a Chinese cardiothoracic surgeon and medicinal educator, known for being the founder of biomedical engineering in the People's Republic of China and the editor of the first modern surgery textbook in the Chinese language. He was also the first director-general of the Chinese Society of Biomedical Engineering (CSBE).

Huang joined the Chinese Communist Party in 1955. He was selected as the deputy to the 1st, 2nd, 3rd and 4th National People's Congress. Meanwhile, he was the member of the 5th and 6th Chinese People's Political Consultative Conference (CPPCC).

== Early life and education ==
Huang was born on July 14, 1906. The early death of Huang's father somewhat accounted for his future profession. He was enrolled at Nankai High School in 1921.

He passed the Pre-Medical Entrance Test of the Peking Union Medical College (PUMC) in 1924 and obtained his BS diploma from Yenching University in 1930. Then he took MD degree from the medical college in 1933.

== Career ==
By 1935, Huang completed his surgical residency at the PUMC Hospital. Then he went to Shanghai to work at Zhongshan Hospital affiliated with the National Shanghai Medical College. There, he was promoted to the surgery lecturer. As Japan invaded China, Huang hurried to arrive at Wuxi as the deputy chief of the Shanghai medical team.

Since Japanese captured Shanghai, Huang went Kunming along with the college. In 1940, Huang got Tsinghua University's single place for the medical student studying in the U.S. whose expense from the return of the Boxer Indemnities.

He joined the surgical residency program at the University of Michigan in October 1941, receiving his degree in 1943.

Huang shown his refused attitude towards the Reorganized National Government. After the Second Sino-Japanese War ended in 1945, Huang could hardly wait to return China; however, the trip delayed when he fell ill with pulmonary tuberculosis.

Between 1945 and 1951, Huang continued with his work as a professor of surgery. He established the cardiothoracic surgery wards in Zhongshan Hospital and the General Hospital affiliated to the Red Cross Society of China (Huashan Hospital now). He was elected president of the Chinese Surgical Association in 1947.

During the Korean War, Huang served at an army hospital and was appointed to supervise medical activities in Shanghai. His excellent skill led to arranging his seat next to Mao Zedong's during the congressional dinner in 1951, which could be regarded as a great honour in China.

During the next few years, Huang was Vice Dean of the Shanghai Medical College and President of Zhongshan Hospital. However, he continued to operate and to train young surgeons. In 1955, Huang was elected as an academician of the Chinese Academy of Sciences.

In 1956, Huang became the founding president of the Shanghai Chest Hospital. He took the post formally in December 1957. During the same period, Huang also dedicated much of his energy to edit the first modern surgical textbook in the Chinese language, which was distributed for evaluation at medical schools nationwide in 1958. The material was revised in May 1960 and a second edition was published in 1964.

In 1958, he was appointed as president of the Chinese Academy of Medical Sciences (CAMS), holding the concurrent post as the President of PUMC. The new PUMC was officially opened in September 1959, it was the only medical school in China providing an eight-year education and training program. He remained in that position for the next 25 years.

After the beginning of the Cultural Revolution, Huang was demoted and underwent his most tough period. At first, he was obliged to work at a hospital at the suburb of Beijing, then he went to the county hospital of Xinle, Hebei. Finally he was exiled to a May Seventh Cadre School in Yongxiu County until 1971.

In 1975, Huang and Wu Jieping began working on a new edition of the Textbook of Surgery. It was widespread among the medical schools of mainland China as it published in 1979.

On May 9, 1979, Huang was a lecturer at the American Medical Association's 75th Congress on Medical Education in Washington, DC. At that meeting, he received the "World's Outstanding Medical Educator" award.

The CAMS Institute of Biomedical Engineering once moved to west China during the Cultural Revolution, which halted its normal research. It relocated to Tianjin in 1984 with Huang's support. Moreover, he helped the institute translating a relative book despite he was quite weak.

When Huang was in the United States, the collapse therapy for pulmonary tuberculosis interested him. He plunged into treating the pulmonary tuberculosis patients when he went back Shanghai. Huang focused on the patent ductus arteriosus and cardiopulmonary bypass in the 1960s. He also put a high premium on the rural medicine. He led a circuit medical team at Xiangyin in 1964, then he edited a textbook for the barefoot doctors in the next year.

Besides English and German, Huang had a good grasp of Russian to learn from the Soviet Union. He was elected as a foreign academician of the USSR Academy of Medical Sciences in 1961.

== Death and posthumous recognition ==
On June 22, 1983, Huang underwent surgical repair of his abdominal aortic aneurysm, which was complicated by postoperative myocardial infarction. He rested for only two months before returning to work. As the CPPCC held in 1984, Huang felt discomfort from the hectic work schedule, at the same time, he bore the burden of editing the 4th edition textbook. On the morning of May 14, he died from a sudden onset of cardiac arrhythmia.

The 4th edition of the Textbook of Surgery, renamed Huang Jia-si's Textbook of Surgery, was published in December 1986.

The Huang Jia-si BME Award which is named after him was established by the CSBE in 2015.

There is a memorial square with Huang's statue and a memorial hall at his home town.

== Family ==
Huang's mother, Xie Yuhong (Chinese: 謝玉虹), was one of a few contemporary literate females in China, raised her five sons alone and died in 1925. When Huang approached 18 years of age, his marriage was prearranged by his mother and grandfather. He never met his bride, Xu Chundi (Chinese: 徐春棣) until the wedding day in April 1926. Xu was once a mathematics teacher. They had a son: Huang Wenkun (Chinese: 黃文昆) and a daughter: Huang Wenmei (Chinese: 黃文美).
