= Jiang Shaoji =

Jiang Shaoji (simplified Chinese: 江绍基; traditional Chinese: 江紹基; pinyin: Jiāng Shàojī; 1919–1995) was a Chinese internist and gastroenterologist. He was a professor in Shanghai Jiao Tong University, School of Medicine and elected an Academician of the Chinese Academy of Engineering in 1994.

Jiang was a native of Wuxi, Jiangsu Province. He graduated from Medical school of Saint John's University, Shanghai and received M.D. in 1945. After that, he became an internist in Shanghai Hongren Hospital and promoted to the vice president of that hospital in 1954. In 1957, he was appointed as the vice president of Renji Hospital and also worked as the vice chief of internal medicine department. After 1978, he successively held the posts of vice president of medical science department in Shanghai Second Medical University (SSMU), vice president and honorary president of Shanghai Institute of immunology, vice president of school administration committee in SSMU. He also held posts of vice president, president of Chinese Society of Gastroenterology, which is a specialty society affiliated to Chinese Medical Association. He was one of the founders and the first president of Shanghai Institute of Digestive Disease, which was found in 1984.

In the 1950s, Jiang joined the campaign of schistosomiasis control. He manifested that dwarfism caused by schistosomiasis could come back to growing state after treatment. In China, he was the first to use colonoscopy observing pathological change in the colon of those suffered from schistosomiasis. He also does research about chronic hepatitis, gastritis and gastric cancer. His team established the gastric cancer model of wolf dog, observed the relationship of vitamins and gastric cancer. They applied folic acid, selenium, and tretinoin to induce differentiation of gastric precancerous lesions.

== See also ==
- Introduction from Shanghai Jiao Tong University School of Medicine(in Chinese)
- Introduction from St. John's University, Taiwan(in Chinese)
