= Renji Hospital, Shanghai Jiao Tong University School of Medicine =

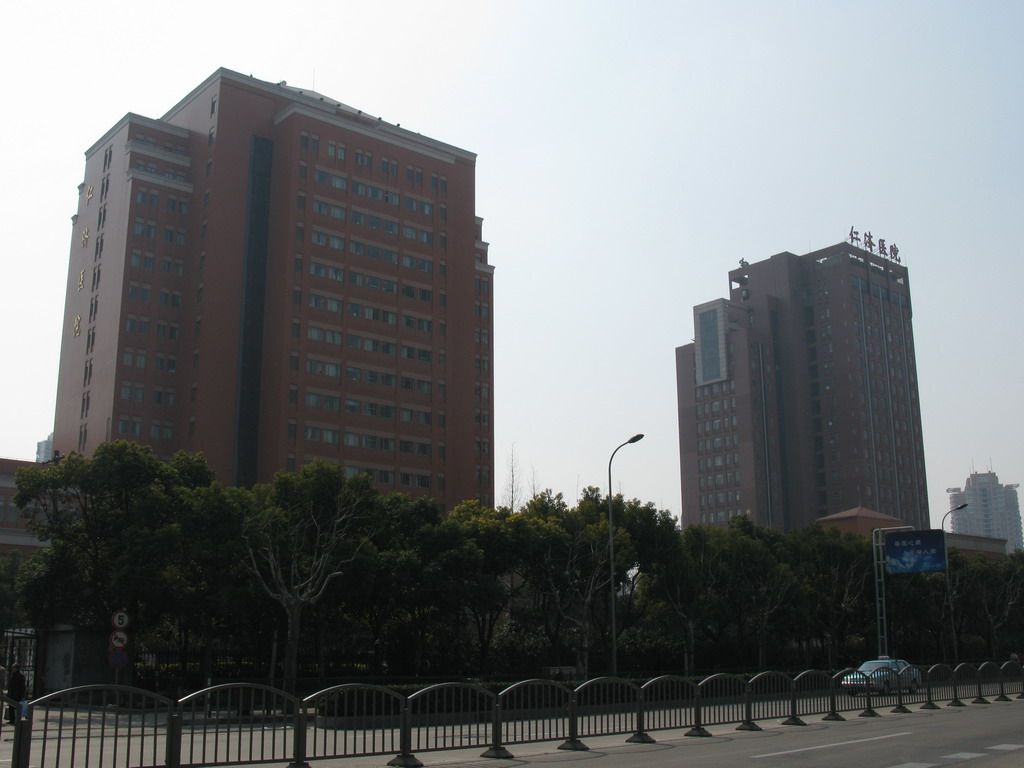
- East part of hospital

Geography
- Location: Huangpu District, Pudong New Area and Minhang District, Shanghai, China
- Coordinates: 31.233°N 121.484°E

Organisation
- Care system: Public
- Type: Teaching
- Affiliated university: Shanghai Jiao Tong University School of Medicine

Services
- Standards: Grade 3, Class A (Chinese: 三级甲等)
- Emergency department: Yes in Pudong, No in Puxi
- Beds: 1600

History
- Founded: 1844; 182 years ago

Links
- Website: www.renji.com
- Lists: Hospitals in China

Renji Hospital, Shanghai Jiao Tong University School of Medicine (上海交通大学医学院附属仁济医院) is a public hospital in Pudong, Shanghai, China. The hospital is a university hospital affiliated to the Shanghai Jiao Tong University School of Medicine.

== History ==
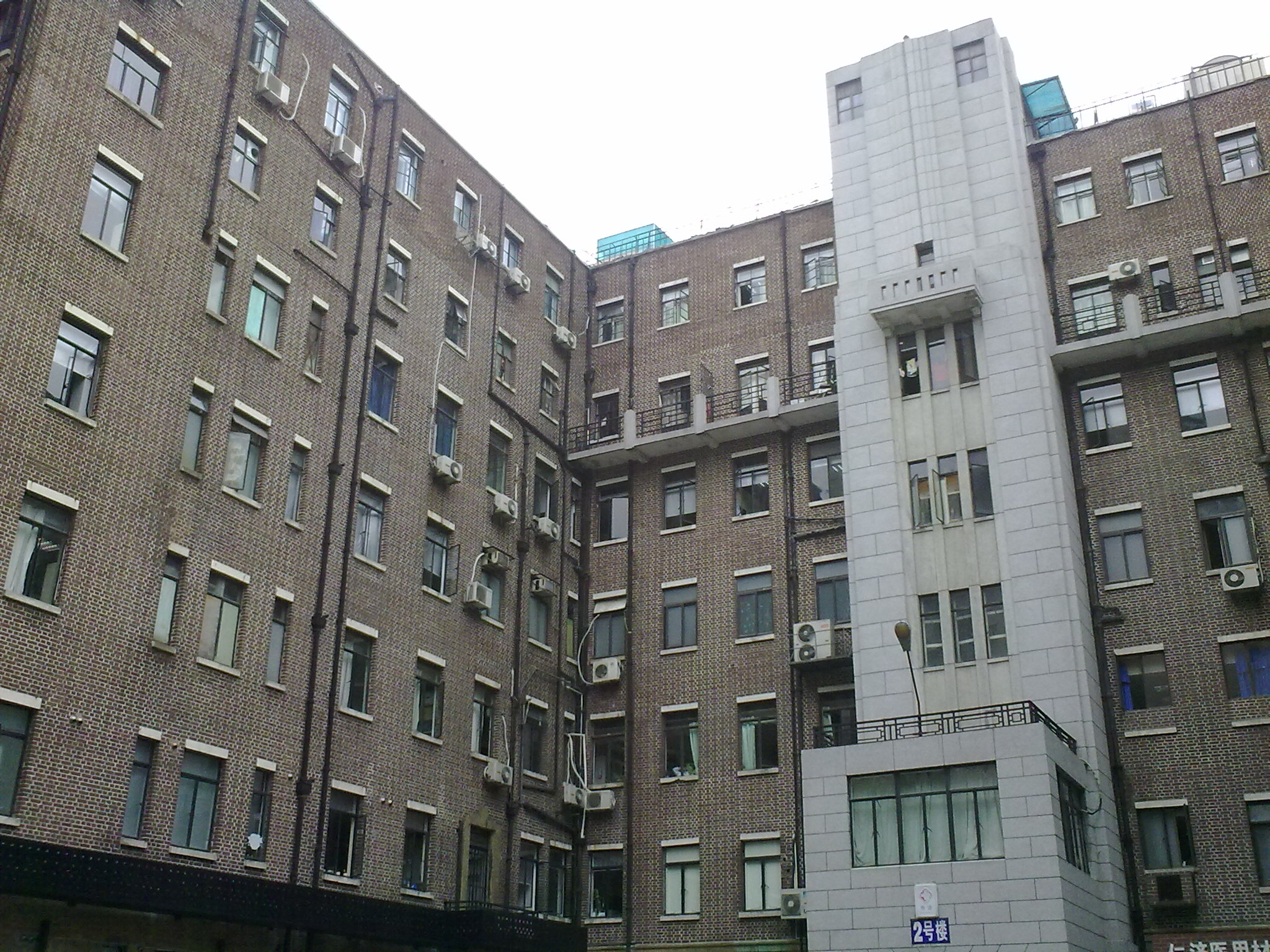
West part of Renji Hospital

Renji is the first western hospital in Shanghai and the second in China. William Lockhart, a missionary from Britain, rented a house in the inhabited area near Da Dong Men (Big East Gate) of Shanghai County and opened the hospital in 1844, the 24th year of the Qing dynasty Daoguang Emperor. It was then known as 'the Chinese Hospital'. Two years later, the hospital moved to Mai Jia Quan (now Middle Shandong Road), and changed its name to Shantung Road Hospital, also called Renji Yi Guan (仁济医馆), which had 60 beds and started an out-patient clinic. In 1927, the hospital received a legacy from the British merchant, Henry Lester, comprising one million taels of silver and four lots of real estate, which were used to expand the hospital. In 1932, a six floor building was constructed for the hospital, and the number of beds was increased to 250. It became Renji Hospital, although some people called it the Lester Chinese Hospital. Till 1949, Renji Hospital had 300 beds.

In November 1952, Shanghai Second Medical College took over control of Renji Hospital from East China Health Care Administration and renamed Renji Hospital Affiliated to Shanghai Second Medical College. During the 'Cultural Revolution', the hospital once changed its name to 'Gong Nong Bing Hospital' (workers, farmers and armymen's hospital) and 'The 3rd People's Hospital'. In Dec. 1984, the hospital regained to its former name Renji. In 1985, Shanghai Second Medical College renamed as Shanghai Second Medical University (SSMU), and Renji Hospital became an affiliated hospital of SSMU. At the end of 1990, Renji had 607 beds and 1,211 staff members. In 2005, Shanghai Second Medical University was merged to Shanghai Jiao Tong University and Renji Hospital then became an affiliated hospital of Shanghai Jiao Tong University School of Medicine.

=== Present ===
As Pudong became an open economic development zone, Renji chose a new place for its extension in Lujiazui. Now, Renji Hospital has four parts, the west part is the old location in Huangpu district, the east part is in Pudong New Area, the south part is in Minhang District, and the north part is a reproductive medicin center, located on Lingshan street, Pudong District.

In 2007, the hospital has 24.2 acres (98,000 m^{2}) in space, 185,744 square meters of building space, 1,600 patient-beds, and 2,651 employees, among which 411 are senior doctors. It treats about 2.1 million emergency cases and outpatients, about 57,000 inpatients and over 28,000 operations every year.

Gastroenterology is a national key discipline. Renji is also known for rheumatology, cardiology, obstetrics, gynecology, andrology, nephrology, hematology, general surgery, neurosurgery and cardiothoracic surgery. Renji also has several research institutes, including Shanghai Institute of Digestive Disease, Shanghai Cancer Institute, Institute of Molecular Medicine, etc.

== Notable professors ==
- Lan Xichun (1907–1995)
- Huang Mingxin (Chinese: 黄铭新) (1909–2001)
- Jiang Shaoji (1919–1995)
- Qian Jiaqi (1939–2019)
- Chen Shunle (Chinese: 陈顺乐) (1932–2021)

== See also ==
- Introduction to Renji Hospital
- Official website (in Chinese)
