= Feng You-xian =

Vascular surgeon

- 冯友贤
- Born: China
- Known for: Invention of silk vascular prosthesis Vascular surgery
- Relatives: (granddaughter) Chennie Huang 黄承妮

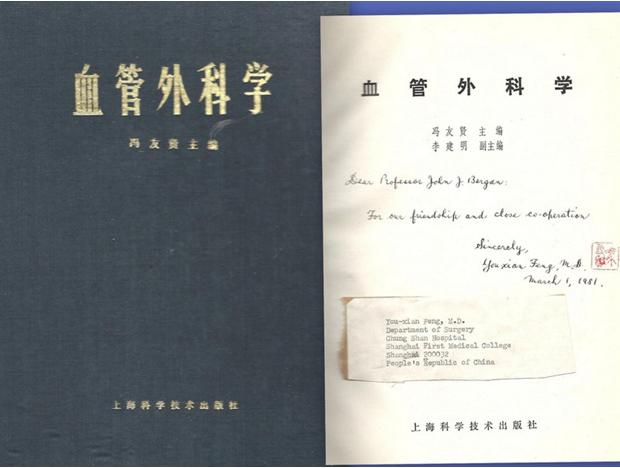
China's first textbook on vascular surgery by Dr Feng; In 1981, Northwestern University hosted a visit by Professor Feng You-xian of Shanghai First Medical College. He presented Dr James S. T. Yao with this book.

Feng You-xian (Chinese: 冯友贤; 1919 - 2008) was a renowned vascular surgeon who pioneered and headed the department of vascular surgery at Shanghai First Medical College of Zhongshan Hospital, the most prestigious teaching hospital in the People’s Republic of China.

Dr. Feng authored the first textbook on vascular surgery, published in 1980 by Shanghai Kexue Jishu Chubanshe 上海科学技术出版社.

In the 1950s, Dr. Feng developed the first silk vascular prosthesis in Shanghai. In 1957, he successfully performed a lower limb aneurysm operation using this prosthesis, marking a significant milestone in the history of medicine since the establishment of the PRC in 1949.

Throughout the 1980s, he was invited to take up professorships at various institutions in the United States, including the University of Massachusetts Medical School and Loma Linda University School of Medicine in California. He also delivered guest lectures in Kuwait in the late 1980s.
