= Canadian Neonatal Network =

Neonatal healthcare network

The Canadian Neonatal Network (CNN) is an organization composed of neonatologists and neonatal health professionals from across Canada. The network was created in 1995 by Dr. Shoo Kim Lee, and currently its steering committee is composed of Drs. Keith Barrington, Aaron Chiu, Kim Dow, Jonathan Hellmann, Bruno Piedboeuf, Molly Seshia, Prakesh Shah (who also serves as the Associate Director of the Network) and Wendy Yee. Sandy Maksimowska currently holds the position of CNN Project Coordinator.

== Recognition ==
The CNN was recognized in 2004 by the Canadian Institutes of Health Research (CIHR) with their "CIHR Knowledge Translation Award". In the award citation, the CIHR described the CNN as "the archetype of the knowledge translation network in Canada."

== Membership ==
Canadian hospitals with tertiary NICUs can become institutional members, and individuals with research background in neonatology are welcomed to apply. All applications are screened through a steering committee.

== Participating hospitals ==
Hospital	Location
BC Children's Hospital	Vancouver, British Columbia
Children's Hospital of Eastern Ontario	Ottawa, Ontario
Centre Hospitalier Universitaire de Quebec	Sainte Foy, Quebec
Centre Hospitalier Universitaire de Sherbrooke	Fleurimont, Quebec
Dr. Everett Chalmers Hospital	Fredericton, New Brunswick
Foothills Medical Centre	Calgary, Alberta
Victoria General Hospital	Victoria, British Columbia
Hamilton Health Sciences Centre	Hamilton, Ontario
Hospital for Sick Children	Toronto, Ontario
Health Sciences Centre	Winnipeg, Manitoba
Hôpital Sainte-Justine	Montreal, Quebec
IWK Health Centre	Halifax, Nova Scotia
Janeway Children's Health and Rehabilitation Centre	St. John's, Newfoundland and Labrador
Jewish General Hospital	Montreal, Quebec
Kingston General Hospital	Kingston, Ontario
Montreal Children's Hospital	Montreal, Quebec
Mount Sinai Hospital	Toronto, Ontario
Royal Alexandra Hospital / Stollery Children's Hospital	Edmonton, Alberta
Royal Columbian Hospital	New Westminster, British Columbia
Regina General Hospital	Regina, Saskatchewan
Royal University Hospital	Saskatoon, Saskatchewan
Royal Victoria Hospital	Montreal, Quebec
St. Boniface General Hospital	Winnipeg, Manitoba
Moncton Hospital	Moncton, New Brunswick
St. Joseph Health Centre	London, Ontario
St. John Regional Hospital	Saint John, New Brunswick
Sunnybrook Health Sciences Centre	Toronto, Ontario
Surrey Memorial Hospital	Surrey, British Columbia
Cape Breton Regional Hospital	Sydney, Nova Scotia
Windsor Regional Hospital	Windsor, Ontario
