= Beijing New Century International Hospital for Children =

Geography
- Location: Fuxingmen, Beijing, China

Organisation
- Care system: Medicare
- Type: Children
- Affiliated university: Beijing Children's Hospital

Services
- Emergency department: Yes
- Beds: 104

History
- Opened: 2005

Links
- Website: www.ncich.com.cn
- Lists: Hospitals in China

New Century International Hospital for Children (Chinese: 北京新世纪国际儿童医院), NCICH is a private, joint-venture, institution affiliated with the Beijing Children's Hospital at Beijing, next to the east gate of the Beijing Children's Hospital. The International Children's Hospital features services specifically designed for children and youth. In addition to full daily clinics in all of the major specialty areas, there are also focused programs in pediatric eye care and pediatric dentistry. This hospital has around 104 beds, including 95 beds for children and 9 beds for newborns. It has over 8,500 square meters building area, 24/7 emergency service, covered by many international and national insurance companies.

== Overview ==
The International Children's Hospital is a private, joint-venture, institution affiliated with the Beijing Children's Hospital.

The inpatient floors feature 80 private rooms with sleeping accommodations for a parent to stay overnight with the child. In addition, there are 20 "expansive deluxe suites" with extended seating and other features.

== Programs and services ==
The International Children's Hospital offers services specifically designed for children. In addition to daily clinics covering all major specialties, it also features focused programs in pediatric eye care and pediatric dentistry.

The health management department provides developmental assessment, annual health examinations, and routine immunizations, while a specially trained pediatric nutritionist advises parents on diet and nutritional concerns.

The 24-hour-a-day, 7-days a week, pediatric emergency room is staffed by Beijing's pediatric emergency specialists. This facility includes examination rooms, overnight observation beds and access to the hospital's emergency capabilities in surgery and medicine.

== Scope of services ==
Pediatrics Departments:

- Ear, Nose and Throat
- Ophthalmology
- Stomatology
- Dermatology
- Rheumatoid/Immunology
- Gynecology
- Infectious Disease
- Respiratory Medicine
- Allergic Disease
- Nephrology
- Digestive System Department
- Cardiology
- Neurology
- Hematological Department
- Nepiology
- Traditional Chinese medicine
- Endocrinology Department
- General Surgery
- Orthopedic Surgery
- Urology
- Neurosurgery
- Thoracic Surgery
- Surgical Oncology
- Neonatal Surgery
- Pediatric Early Stage Intelligence Growth Clinic
- Health Center
- Outpatient Department
- Plastic Surgery
- Psychological Clinic

Specialties:

- 7-day * 24-hour Accident and Emergency
- Family Doctor
- Physical Examination of Children
- Oral Health Care Annual Membership Card
- General Anesthesia Lower Tooth Treatment
- Strabismus surgery
- Optometry Center
- Discounted Surgery Package
- Adolescent Girls Perineum Disease
- Electrophysiology Tests
- Children Safe Medication Gene Test
- Respiration Tract Nursing Service
- Winter Disease Cured in Summer-Stick to Acupuncture Points in Hot Summer Days
- Children's Eyeglasses
- Summer Medication for Children
- Children's Health Management
- Anodynia Capistration Treatment
- Emergency Observation Wards
- 24-hour EEG
