= Children's Hospital =

A children's hospital is a hospital which offers its services exclusively to children.

Children's Hospital may also refer to:

- Childrens Hospital, a 2008–2016 American parody TV series
- Children's Hospital (Australian TV series), a 1997–1998 ABC drama
- Children's Hospital (British TV series), a 1993–2003 documentary
- The Children's Hospital (novel), 2006, by Chris Adrian

== See also ==
- Children's Hospital Association
- Foundling hospital
- "In the Children's Hospital", an 1880 poem by Alfred, Lord Tennyson
- List of children's hospitals
  - List of children's hospitals in the United States
- Category:Children's hospitals
- Category:Children's hospitals by country
- Category:Children's hospitals in the United States
