= Shanghai Sixth People's Hospital =

Geography
- Location: Xuhui District, Shanghai, China
- Coordinates: 31.177701°N 121.423368°E

Organisation
- Care system: Public
- Type: Teaching
- Affiliated university: Shanghai Jiao Tong University

Services
- Standards: Grade 3, Class A
- Emergency department: Yes
- Beds: 600

History
- Founded: 1904; 122 years ago

Links
- Lists: Hospitals in China

Shanghai Sixth People's Hospital (Chinese: 上海市第六人民医院) is a teaching hospital in Shanghai, China, affiliated with the School of Medicine, Shanghai Jiao Tong University. Founded in 1904, Shanghai Sixth People's Hospital is a large-scale tertiary general hospital with more than 100 years of accumulation. In 2002, it became the affiliated hospital of Shanghai Jiaotong University. The hospital has two campuses, Xuhui and Lingang; there are 2,366 beds, of which 1,766 are in the Xuhui campus, and 600 in the Lingang hospital area; 52 clinical medical technology departments. In the past five years, the hospital's annual outpatient and emergency visits topped 5 million, its annual discharges topped nearly 150,000, and its annual inpatient surgeries topped 110,000.

It is the home to SJTU 6th clinical medical school, Shanghai Limbs Microsurgery Institute, and Shanghai Diabetes Institute, Shanghai Key Laboratory of Diabetes, Shanghai Key Laboratory of Sleep-disordered Breathing Diseases, Shanghai Orthopedic New Materials and Repair and Regeneration Engineering Technology Research Center, Shanghai Bone Disease Clinical Research Center, China Shanghai International Limb Microsurgery Training Center, Shanghai Medical Ultrasound Training Center, Shanghai Institute of Ultrasound Medicine, Shanghai Jiaotong University Imaging Medicine Institute, Shanghai Jiaotong University Otorhinolaryngology Institute, Shanghai Oriental Urology Repair Reconstruction Institute, Biochip Beijing National Engineering Research Center Shanghai Branch, Medical Absorbable Biomaterials Engineering Technology Research Center. It is a teaching hospital of SJTU, Shanghai Traditional Chinese Medicine University, and Soochow University.

The hospital currently has 6 national key clinical specialties (orthopedics, endocrinology and metabolism, otolaryngology, medical imaging, sports medicine, emergency medicine), 3 national key disciplines (orthopedic surgery, endocrinology and metabolic disease, cardiology) Angiology), one key specialty of the State Administration of Traditional Chinese Medicine (Department of Needle Injury), one special specialty of National Menopausal Health Care (Department of Obstetrics and Gynecology) of the Department of Maternity and Children of the National Health and Health Commission, and the "top priority" clinical medicine in Shanghai 2 centers (traumatic orthopedics and bone and joint diseases clinical medical center, endocrine and metabolic diseases clinical medical center), 2 "top priority" clinical key disciplines in Shanghai (otolaryngology, medical imaging), Shanghai medical leading key 3 disciplines (Limb Microsurgery, Endocrinology and Metabolism, Interventional Imaging), 2 Shanghai Key Clinical Specialties "Zhenlongtou" Series (Orthopedics, Endocrinology and Metabolism), and 1 Shanghai Key Clinical Specialty "Show Two Wings" Series (Department of Medical Imaging), 1 key specialty of clinical pharmacy in Shanghai (Department of Pharmacy), 1 clinical advantage specialty of Traditional Chinese Medicine of the Shanghai Municipal Science, Clinical Pharmacology, Nutrition).
