= Lan Xichun =

Chinese surgeon

Lan Xichun (simplified Chinese: 兰锡纯; traditional Chinese: 蘭錫純; 1907–1995) was a surgeon of general surgery and cardio-thoracic surgery. He did the first splenic-renal vein anastomotic operation in China. He improved the operation of cholelithiasis and laid the foundation of hepatobiliary surgery in China. He is also one of the pioneers of cardiovascular surgery. He did the first mitral commissurotomy operation in China. He was also engaged in medical education and brought up a lot of new surgeons. He served as President of Renji Hospital and Shanghai Second Medical College.
