= University Children's Hospital Basel =

Hospital in Basel, Switzerland

Coordinates: 47°33′46″N 7°34′59″E

The University Children’s Hospital Basel (UKBB)

Services
- Emergency department: 24 Hours
- Beds: 100

Helipads
- Helipad: No

History
- Founded: 2 January 1862

Links
- Website: http://www.ukbb.ch

The University Children's Hospital Basel (UKBB) is an independent, university-based centre of competence for paediatric and juvenile medicine, as well as for teaching and research."

The UKBB exists since 1999. On January 29, 2011, after several years of planning and constructing, the UKBB started operations in its new location at Spitalstrasse 33 in Basel. The colourful front of the building is its landmark. Nearly 900 staff members from different departments take care of around 6’700 stationary infants, children and adolescents and perform around 84’000 ambulant treatments each year. The biggest children's orthopaedics department and one of the biggest children's emergency units are located at the UKBB.

The Children's Hospital Basel was founded on 2 January 1862, when it opened as a new hospital on the banks of the Rhine in Kleinbasel (Lesser Basel). The hospital continued to grow until 1999, when the UKBB was created from the merging of the Basel Children's Hospital and the Bruderholz Children's Clinic. Dr. med. Conrad E. Müller has been CEO of the clinic since May 2008.

== Emergency unit ==
The emergency unit at the UKBB is staffed around the clock. It is a contact point for emergencies either on-site or via telephone. Over 31000 consultations a year make it one of the biggest emergency units of Switzerland. The staff handles more than 100 consultations and 70 telephone enquiries every day.

=== University Children’s Hospital of both Basel ===
Organising institution	Hospital council (Spitalrat), the cantons of Basel-Stadt and Basel-Landschaft
Place	4056 Basel
Canton	Basel-Stadt
Country	Switzerland
Management	Lic. iur. Marco Fischer, Vorsitzender Geschäftsleitung, CEO UKBB
Employees	883
Capacity/Beds	100 beds and an additional 16 beds for neonatology in the gynaecological hospital of the University Hospital of Basel.
Foundation	1862 Children's Hospital Basel (Kinderspital Basel), 1999 merger with the Children's Clinic Bruderholz BL (Kinderklinik Bruderholz)
Website	http://www.ukbb.ch

== History ==
=== How it all began ===
Basel has to thank Anna Elisabeth Burckhardt-Vischer for the foundation of a children's hospital. She ordered the modification of the adjoining building of her mansion zum Kränzlein, at St. Johanns-Vorstadt, so that it was possible to use it for the care of sick children. In 1846 she opened the small nursing home. On the opening day, three of the six sickbeds were already occupied by young patients. Dr. Carl Steckeisen performed the medical treatment free of charge. Carolina Rauh, a nurse from Württemberg was responsible for patient care.

In 1852 the sisters Anna Elisabeth Burckhardt-Vischer, Juliana Birmann-Vischer and Charlotte His-Vischer established the foundation "Kinderspital Basel" (Children's Hospital Basel). After the death of all three women, the estate at the bank of the Rhine – in Kleinbasel (Lesser Basel) – was bought and the construction of the children's hospital was initiated.

=== Children’s Hospital Basel ===
The 2nd of January 1862 is regarded as original birthday of the Children's Hospital Basel. The opening of the newly constructed hospital at the bank of the Rhine was celebrated with a small ceremony. In the beginning it held more than 40 beds and was regarded as a prototype building for a children's hospital. After a short while the absence of an operating room proved to be a disadvantage. But only 30 years after the opening, the first operating room was taken into service at the children's hospital. Soon after that, the first x-ray machine was installed. As the population grew, the number of patients rose at the children's hospital. In 1862, 120 patients were cared for at the children's hospital. Already in 2009, the number rose to about 6500.

=== Merger to form the University Hospital of both Basel ===
Registry office around 1870

In the beginning of 1999 the two cantonal children's hospitals in Basel and at Bruderholz merged to form the university children's Hospital – an organisation regulated by public law with three locations. The general paediatric orthopaedics, an emergency room and a polyclinic were located at the Römergasse in Basel. The paediatric surgery, the paediatric orthopaedics, the intensive care unit, another polyclinic and an emergency room were located at Bruderholz (Basel-Landschaft). The neonatology, the department for new born and premature babies, was integrated into the new building of the women's hospital with 16 beds and officially became the third location of the UKBB. After a short while, it became clear that the distribution across three locations gave rise to problem. Therefore, the two cantons Basel-Stadt and Basel-Landschaft sought a solution: In August 2000, both governments argued for a new hospital with a single location, namely the areal of the former women's hospital in Basel.

== Organisation ==
=== Administration ===
An executive board, which manages the UKBB in administrative matters, consists of persons who work in different areas of the hospital.

Apart from numerous employees in the fields of medicine and nursing service, the university children's hospital of both Basel employs further personnel in different administrative departments.

=== Departments/specialist divisions ===
- Adolescent medicine
- Anesthesia
- Cardiology
- Care management
- Dermatology
- Endocrinology/Diabetology
- Gastroenterology
- Gynaecology
- Hospital school
- Infectious disease
- Intensive care medicine
- Medical genetics
- Medical research
- Neonatology
- Nephrology
- Neurology and developmental pediatrics
- Nursing
- Oncology/Hematology
- Orthopaedics
- Outpatient clinic
- Pediatric laboratory
- Pediatric surgery
- Pediatrics
- Pneumology
- Psychiatry
- Radiology
- Rheumatology
- Therapies and pedagogy
- Vaccinology

== Additional services ==
The University Children's Hospital of both Basel offers additional services, which are coordinated by the care management division. Patients, their relatives and ultimately the staff profits from these additional services. Care management incorporates the hospital school, visitor's service, social counselling, the care team, interpretation services as well as the Villa Kunterbunt and the library/toy library. The care management division also organizes guided tours for school classes.

=== Day care centre Villa Kunterbunt ===
The university children's hospital runs a day care centre. Not only does Villa Kunterbunt (Villa Villekulla) offer assisted painting and handicraft work, it also provides a library (an outpost of the GGG public library Basel) and a toy library. Patients of the UKBB and their siblings can use the libraries.

=== Hospital school ===
In order to provide the children with some daily routine, the UKBB has a department, which takes care of the hospital school. It is integrated in the care management division. Qualified teachers practice Mathematics or French with the children. They adjust their instructions according to the subject material and the state of health of each child. The teachers collaborate closely with the school of the child. Despite the illness, the child should not fall behind in class.

== Organisations/ Associations/ Cooperation/ Foundations ==
=== Belop ===
The members of the Belop association (German Begleitung der Eltern während der Operation ihres Kindes) takes care of parents, whose children are in surgery. The parent advisor stays with the parents until the child fell asleep. Afterwards she shows the parents where they can wait and helps them to find their way around the hospital. The parent advisor has a coffee with the parents or just listens to them. The parent advisor is in close contact with the operating team and is able to inform the parents about the duration of the operation. As soon as the child is back in the anaesthetic recovery room, the parent advisor leads the parents back to their child. The parent advisors work at the UKBB every day. Belop unburdens the hospital staff as well as the parents.

=== Hospital clowns ===
Once a week the “dream doctors” visit the young patients. These visits are organised by the Foundation Theodora.

=== Pro UKBB foundation ===
The foundation Pro University Children’s Hospital of both Basel was founded on 6 January 2005. The foundation is devoted to the long-term development of the University Children's Hospital of both Basel.

=== Ronald McDonald House ===
Since 2010, the Ronald McDonald House Basel offers the parents of sick children a temporary home.

== Research ==
=== Fields of research ===
The clinical and epidemiological research areas at UKBB are integrated into the key research areas of the faculty of medicine at the University of Basel. It is also linked to several working groups in clinical and biomedical research, home as well as abroad. The so-called basic research of the UKBB is situated within the department of biomedicine at the University of Basel..

A special emphasis is given to the following key research areas at UKBB:

- Developmental paediatrics/ pneumology
- Immunology/Infectiology
- Oncology/Hematology
- Paediatric orthopaedics

== Basic, advanced and follow-up training ==
The university children's hospital of both Basel trains future paediatricians, nursing staff and therapists. Furthermore, the hospital offers apprenticeships in various areas..

== Weblinks (German) ==
- University Children's Hospital Basel (UKBB) (German Frontpage with English subpages)
- Clinical Morphology & Biomedical Engineering (CM & BE)
- Swiss Clinical Trial Organisation
- Foundation Pro UKBB
- Alliance of the children's hospitals in Switzerland
- Children's hospital Zurich
- Children's hospital of Eastern Switzerland
- Hospitals entire Switzerland
- Society for children an youth medicine region Basel
