= Children's Hospital of Fudan University =

- National and Shanghai Health and Family Planning Commission; Fudan University Shanghai Medical College

- Entrance of CHFU

Geography
- Location: 399 Wanyuan Road, Minhang, Shanghai, China
- Coordinates: 31°08′22.70″N 121°23′42.70″E

Organisation
- Type: Teaching
- Affiliated university: Fudan University Shanghai Medical College

Services
- Standards: National-level Tertiary Hospital
- Emergency department: Yes
- Beds: 800

History
- Founded: 1952; 74 years ago

Links
- Website: ch.shmu.edu.cn/eng.asp
- Lists: Hospitals in China

The Children's Hospital of Fudan University (abbreviation: CHFU, Chinese: 复旦大学附属儿科医院, colloquially Fudan Children's Hospital) is a national-level tertiary children's hospital in Shanghai, China. It is a university hospital affiliated to Fudan University Shanghai Medical College. The hospital is located in Minhang District with an outpatient clinic located in Xuhui District.

It has been consistently ranked as the top children's hospital in China, and the first children's hospital in Asia to be accredited by Joint Commission International. In January 2017, the hospital, along with the Shanghai Children's Medical Center, was designated as the National Children's Medical Center (Shanghai), which will be located at a new campus in the Shanghai International Medical Zone in Pudong.

== History ==
The Children's Hospital of Fudan University was founded in 1952 and was located on Fenglin Rd in Xuhui District, Shanghai. In 2008, the hospital was moved to its current campus in Minhang District, with its new facility having a space of 80,000 square meters.

== Ranking and Performance ==
Nationally, the hospital is consistently ranked first for general pediatrics, first for pediatric medicine, and second for pediatric surgery. It is currently licensed for 800 inpatient beds, with 35,000 admissions annually. Its outpatient clinics serve over 2.21 million patients annually. As of 2013, the hospital has 1396 employees, with 118 senior staff physicians and 63 postgraduate student advisors.

== Clinical Departments ==
The hospital is a comprehensive medical center for children, and is a member of International SOS. Clinical departments in all areas of pediatrics are present in the hospital and is organized as follows:

=== Medicine ===
- Pediatric Critical Care Medicine
- Pediatric Infectious Disease
- Neonatology
- Pediatric Respiratory Medicine
- Pediatric Neurology
- Pediatric Hematology
- Pediatric Gastroenterology
- Pediatric Endocrinology, Genetics, and Metabolic Disorders
- Pediatric Nephrology and Rheumatology

=== Surgery ===
- Pediatric Surgery and Neonatal Surgery
- Pediatric Urology
- Surgical Oncology
- Pediatric Orthopedic Surgery
- Pediatric Plastic Surgery

=== Pediatric Heart Center ===
- Pediatric Cardiology
- Pediatric Electrocardiography
- Pediatric Echocardiography
- Pediatric Cardiothoracic Surgery

=== Other Clinical Departments ===
- Child Health
- Pediatric Traditional Chinese Medicine
- Pediatric Anesthesiology
- High-Dependency Care Unit
- Pediatric Dermatology
- Pediatric Dentistry
- Pediatric Otorhinolaryngology
- Child Psychology
- Pediatric Physical Medicine and Rehabilitation
- Pediatric Ophthalmology
- Pediatric Clinical Immunology

=== Medical Technology Departments ===
- Pathology
- Laboratory Medicine
- Radiology
- Nuclear Medicine
- Ultrasonography
- Nutrition
- Pharmacy

=== Research Institutes ===
- Pediatrics Research Institute
- Integrative Medicine Research Institute

=== Department of Pediatrics ===
- Department of Pediatrics, Fudan University Shanghai Medical College

== Research ==
The hospital has an extensive research program with 470 projects undertaken between 2004 and 2014, with 200 million yuan of funding provided by national organizations, including the Chinese Academy of Sciences and the Ministry of Health of the People's Republic of China.

Between 2003 and 2013, the hospital has published 550 internationally peer-reviewed articles, and is the publisher of the Chinese edition of Pediatrics (journal).

== Education and Training ==
CHFU is the home to the Department of Pediatrics of Fudan University Shanghai Medical College, and is responsible for the training of 400 undergraduate medical students annually. It is also responsible for the training of over 200 postgraduate fellowship pediatricians annually. It is also licensed as a site for residency training by the Shanghai Municipal Health Bureau.

== Expansion ==
In August 2020, it was announced that CHFU will undergo an extensive expansion project, adding an additional 450 licensed beds to a total of 1250 beds. This includes the establishment of a clinical neonatal specialist centre and a clinical birth defects centre. In addition, an education centre with an area of 10,206 square metres and an integrated inpatient building with an area of 57,443 square metres will be built.
