= China Welfare Institute =

Chinese non-governmental organization

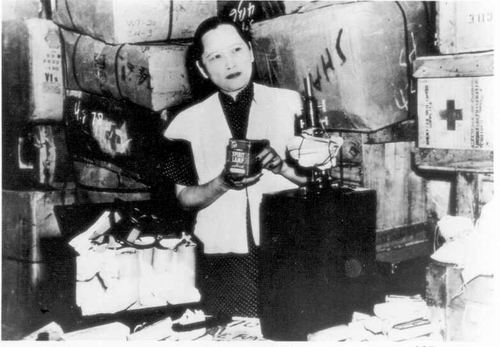
Soong Ching-ling at China Welfare Institute (1940s)

The China Welfare Institute (CWI; 中国福利会) is a Chinese non-governmental organization founded by Soong Ching Ling, the wife of Sun Yat-sen, in Hong Kong on June 14, 1938. It is one of the oldest and most influential NGOs nationwide in China.

The institute was originally known as the China Defense League; after WWII, it was renamed as the China Welfare Fund and in 1950, it took its present name of the China Welfare Institute.

The institute worked on improving conditions for women and children. As part of this, the CWI ran two publishing houses, the Children's Epoch Magazine House and CWI Publishing House; the two merged in 2007 to form the China Welfare Institute Publishing House Company. In 2008, the CWI also set up the Soon Ching Ling School which had almost 1,000 students in 2024.
