= Shanghai Jiao Tong University School of Medicine =

Medical school in China

- 上海交通大学医学院
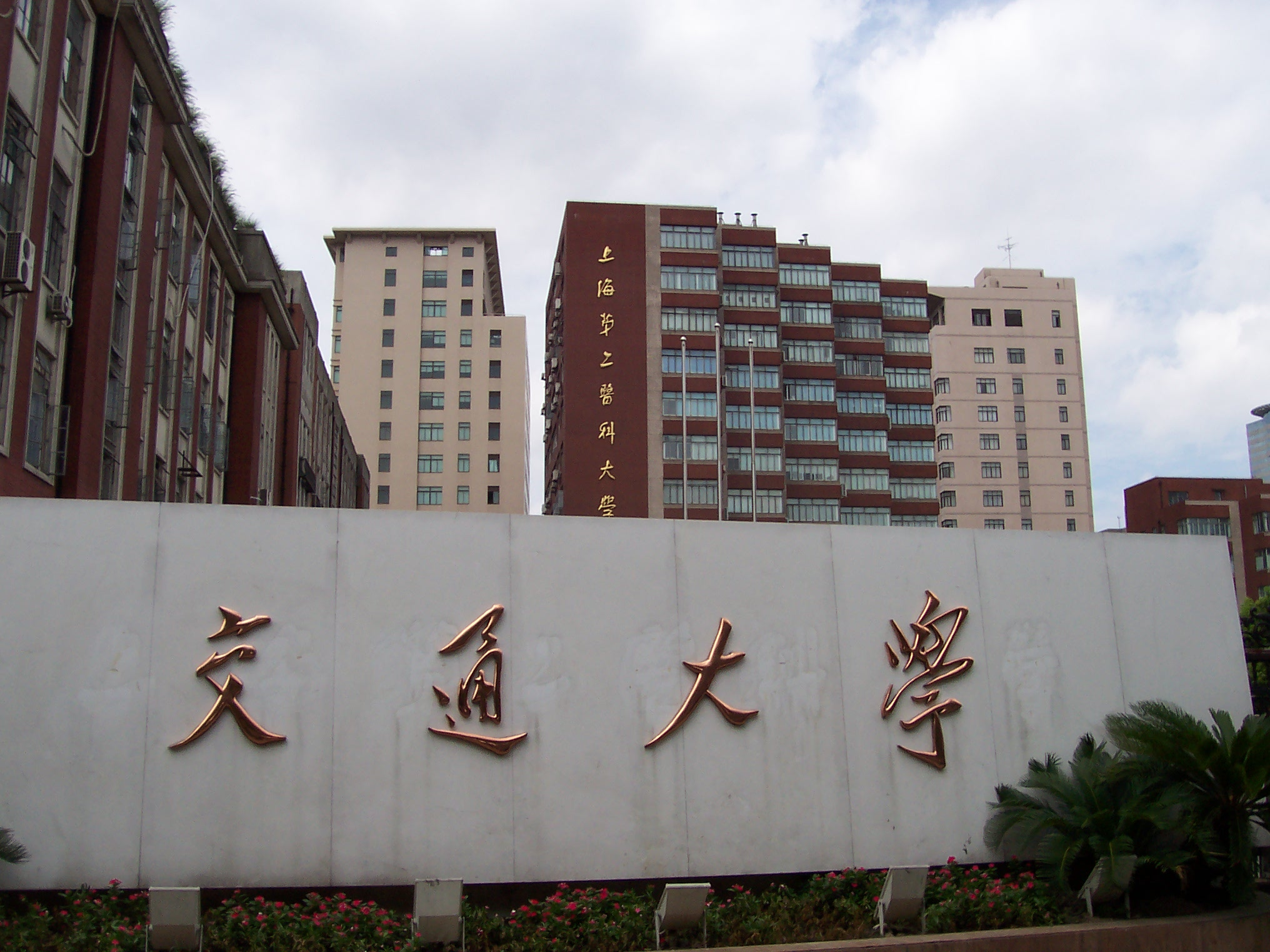
- West campus of Shanghai Jiao Tong University School of Medicine
- Former names: Shanghai Second Medical University; Shanghai Second Medical College
- Motto: 博极医源 精勤不倦
- Type: Public, Research, National
- Established: 1896; 130 years ago
- Parent institution: Shanghai Jiao Tong University
- Dean: Xianqun Fan (范先群)
- Location: Shanghai, China; 31°11′52″N 121°27′07″E
- Website: shsmu.edu.cn english.shsmu.edu.cn

The Shanghai Jiao Tong University School of Medicine (上海交通大学医学院), formerly Shanghai Second Medical University, is a public medical school in Shanghai, China.

== History ==
Shanghai Second Medical College was established in 1952 and was renamed Shanghai Second Medical University in 1985. It was composed of the medical schools of Aurora University, St. John's University and Tong De Medical College. It was a municipal university before 2005.

In July 2005, under an agreement signed by Shanghai Municipal Government and the Ministry of Education, Shanghai Jiao Tong University and Shanghai Second Medical University were merged into one. The new university is administered by both the Shanghai Municipal Government and the Ministry of Education.

In November 2010, SJTUSM became one of the first ten universities jointly supported by the Ministry of Health and the Ministry of Education. The rich historic background of over one hundred years and heroic journey of more than 50 years have eventually brought about a research-oriented medical school with all-round development in medical education, clinical services, and scientific research, as well as other social services, a medical school with outstanding features and distinct advantages, a strong faculty, and remarkable academic achievements. In the second round of evaluating disciplines in degree and graduate programs organized by the Ministry of Education in 2009, clinical medicine of SJTUSM ranked first nationally, and the comprehensive strength of various disciplines belonged to the first echelon of the nation's medical schools.

== Rankings ==
It is one of the two medical schools that received the highest ranking of "A+" in Clinical Medicine from the Ministry of Education of the People's Republic of China. In the 2nd, 3rd, and 4th round of evaluating disciplines in degree and graduate programs organized by the Ministry of Education from 2009 to 2018, and the comprehensive strength of various disciplines belonged to the first echelon of the nation's medical schools.

Clinical medicine of SJTUSM is consistently ranked first among medical schools nationally. As of 2025, it was ranked #55 globally by the U.S. News & World Report. The "Clinical and health" discipline of SJTU also ranked #56 globally by Times Higher Education World University Rankings as of 2025. Its "Pharmacy & Pharmaceutical Sciences" were ranked 8th in the world by the Academic Ranking of World Universities.

== List of presidents ==
- Gong Naiquan (宫乃泉) (October 1952 - December 1953)
- Sun Zhongde (孙仲德) (December 1953 - February 1958)
- Guan Zizhan (关子展) (February 1958 - 1966)
- Lan Xichun (August 1978 - March 1984)
- Wang Zhenyi (王振义) (March 1984 - January 1988)
- Wang Yifei (王一飞) (January 1988 - July 1997)
- Fan Guanrong (范关荣) (July 1997 - March 2003)
- Shen Xiaoming (沈晓明) (March 2003 - March 2006)
- Zhu Zhenggang (朱正纲) (March 2006 - December 2010)
- Chen Guoqiang (陈国强) (December 2010 - present)

== Affiliated hospitals ==
- Ruijin Hospital
- Renji Hospital
- Xinhua Hospital
- Shanghai First People's Hospital
- Shanghai Third People's Hospital
- Shanghai Sixth People's Hospital
- Shanghai Ninth People's Hospital
- Shanghai Chest Hospital
- Shanghai Mental Health Center
- Shanghai Children's Medical Center
- Shanghai Children's Hospital
- International Peace Maternity and Child Health Hospital, also of China Welfare Institute
- Shanghai Tongren Hospital
