= Christine Mitchell =

American filmmaker and bioethicist

Christine I. Mitchell
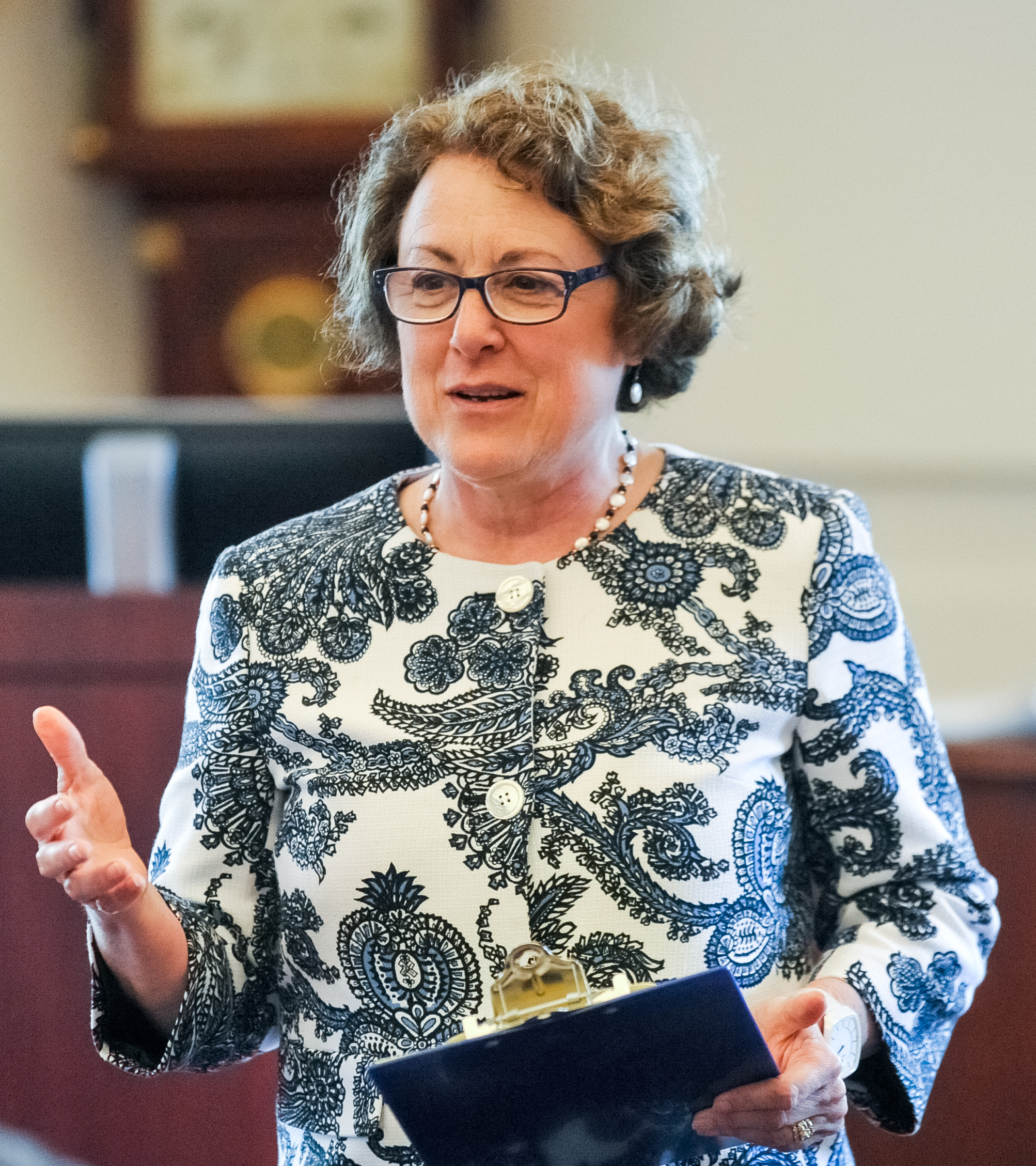
- Mitchell in HMS office (2017)
- Born: December 8, 1951 (age 74); Gardner, Massachusetts, US
- Education: Boston University: MSN, MS Harvard Divinity School: MTS
- Alma mater: Boston University, MSN, MS; Harvard University, MTS
- Occupations: Educational filmmaker and bioethicist
- Years active: 1979 to present
- Employer: Harvard Medical School
- Organization(s): Children's Hospital Boston, Harvard Medical School, Boston University
- Notable work: "Code Gray: Ethical Dilemmas in Nursing"
- Movement: U
- Spouse: Married to Gordon Jack Schultz
- Children: Four children
- Awards: 1984 Academy Award nomination, short documentary Code Gray: Ethical Dilemmas in Nursing<
- Website: HMS Center for Bioethics profile page for Christine Mitchell

Christine I. Mitchell (born December 8, 1951) is an American filmmaker and bioethicist and until her retirement in September 2022, the executive director of the Center for Bioethics at Harvard Medical School (HMS).

== Education ==
Mitchell studied nursing at Boston University, where she earned both bachelor's and master's degrees in the field. She then studied philosophical and religious ethics and the ethics of care at Harvard University and the Harvard Divinity School, where she earned a master's degree.

- 1969 – Narragansett Regional High School, Baldwinville, Massachusetts, diploma
- 1973 – Boston University, School of Nursing, Boston, Massachusetts, BSN
- 1979 – Boston University, School of Nursing, Boston, Massachusetts, MS, Nursing and Pediatrics
- 1982 – Harvard Divinity School/Harvard University, Cambridge, Massachusetts, MTS, Ethics
- 1982–1983 – Course Professor, Ethical issues in Health Care, Graduate Program, Boston University School of Nursing, Boston, Massachusetts
- 1991–1994 – Boston College, Chestnut Hill, Massachusetts, PhD (ABD), Ethics, Philosophy, Nursing (University Fellow)

Ethics Fellowships:

- 1979–1981 – Harvard Medical School, Joseph P. Kennedy Jr. Fellow in Medical Ethics, Interfaculty Program of Harvard University but done at HMS
- 1993–1994 – Harvard University, Fellowship in Ethics and the Professions at Safra Center

== Academic Appointments ==
- 1976–1979 – Assistant Professor of Nursing, University of Virginia School of Nursing, Charlottesville, Virginia
- Visiting professor, DeMontfort University, Leicester, UK
- Co-PI, End-of-Life Care Project, University of Zurich, Department of Biomedical Ethics and University Hospital, Zurich, Switzerland
- 1991–2014 – Hospital Ethicist and Director, Office of Ethics, Children's Hospital, Boston.
- 1993–2014 – Associate Director (Previously Lecturer, then Senior Lecturer), Harvard Medical School Division of Medical Ethics, Department of Global Health and Social Medicine
- 2014–present – Executive Director, Center for Bioethics, Harvard Medical School

== Career ==
She is known for her role in shaping the field in clinical ethics consultations for morally difficult issues in hospital settings. She is a founding member of the American Society for Bioethics Consultation, on which she currently serves, and American Society for Bioethics and Humanities's Clinical Ethics Consultation Affairs standing committee, and most recently, the Ethics Advisory Board of the Human Brain Project's Ethics and Society Subproject, funded by the European Commission. She is a former president of the American Society for Law, Medicine, and Ethics, where she serves on the editorial board of its journal, and the Freedom from Cancer Challenge, where she is a project Advisor.

Mitchell developed an interest in nursing ethics during her years at Boston University, which led her to pursue a Master of Theological Studies degree emphasizing ethics at Harvard University and the Harvard Divinity School in Cambridge. Between those two programs, however, she practiced clinical nursing for several years in Boston and Charlottesville, Virginia, where she became assistant professor of nursing at University of Virginia School of Nursing.

Prior to her role with Harvard's Center for Bioethics, formerly the Division of Medical Ethics (DME) (where she had been associate director before its reorganization), she taught ethics and professional courses for medical students and in the Master of Bioethics Degree Program while on the faculty of the HMS Department of Global Health and Social Medicine.

Her research focuses on clinical ethics consultation and public engagement in bioethics policies, including end-of-life issues, assisted reproductive technologies, and resource allocation related to major natural disasters or pandemics. Mitchell also leads the Ethics Leadership Group for Harvard-affiliated teaching hospitals and health care facilities. She has contributed to the development of nursing ethics as a discipline.

=== Center for Bioethics ===
Mitchell has been involved in ethics work at Boston Children's Hospital, where she founded the hospital's ethics program, directed the hospital's ethics consultation service, and led its Ethics Advisory Committee for thirty years. She has provided ethics consultation at Massachusetts General Hospital, Baystate Medical Center, Beth Israel Deaconess Medical Center, Salem Hospital in Salem, Massachusetts, and Maine Medical Center.

In the Center for Bioethics, Mitchell co-founded with Carol Powers, JD, the volunteer citizen Community Ethics Committee for "informed public input on ethical aspects of health care and health policies." She also developed the annual Harvard Clinical Bioethics Course, leads monthly clinical ethics and Harvard Research Ethics Consortia, and teaches in the HMS Fellowship in Bioethics Program.

=== Professional activities ===
Since 2002, Mitchell has edited ethics cases for The Journal of Clinical Ethics, where she has been on the editorial board since 1989 and is currently its associate editor. She lectures outside Harvard on clinical ethics issues In 2009, the American Society for Bioethics and Humanities formed the Clinical Ethics Consultation Affairs standing committee (CECA) in order to address growing concerns that those providing clinical ethics consultation (CEC) were unqualified.

She is a clinical practice team member of the Johns Hopkins Berman Institute of Bioethics, which produced A Blueprint for 21st Century Nursing Ethics: Report of the National Nursing Summit. She is a member of the advisory committee for the Cambridge Consortium for Bioethics Education, which produces and publishes Cambridge Quarterly of Healthcare Ethics. She also is an advisory board member of the Neuroethics Network (Paris).

In 2018, she was elected vice president of the Association of Bioethics Program Directors,

== Films and media ==
Mitchell's first ethics media was an instructional interactive computer videodisc in 1990, Nursing Ethics and Law, which she produced with two collaborators.

With filmmaker Ben Achtenberg (with whom she has worked for over 26 years, and sometimes with others) she has produced six documentary videos. She was an associate producer of "Code Gray: Ethical Dilemmas in Nursing", a documentary film, which was nominated for (but not awarded) an Academy Award in 1984; their 2002 video, Stanley, about ethical decisions in caring for a patient with end stage kidney failure, was part of a 3-film documentary series and awarded a 2004 Freddie award for medical media. Their 2003 video, Everyday Choices, concerned a visiting nurse and an elderly patient facing ethical questions about waning capacities and independence.

She is an advisor to The Refugee Media Project, sponsored by The Center for Independent Documentary, also of Boston.

== Awards ==
- 1983, MNA Nursing Practice Award, Massachusetts Nursing Association (MNA)
- 1984 Academy Award nomination, short documentary Code Gray: Ethical Dilemmas in Nursing
- 1985, MNA Image of the Professional Nurse Award – Christine I. Mitchell, Massachusetts Nursing Association (MNA)
- 2004, International Freddie Award for medical media
- 2010, Living Legends in Massachusetts Nursing Award, American Nurses Association Massachusetts
- 2018, Nursing Ethics Leadership Award, National Nursing Ethics Conference
- 2018, President-Elect, Association of Bioethics Program Directors

== Publications ==
Christine Mitchell has published on the ethics of medical practice, end-of-life care, pediatrics, fetal medicine, gender, oncology, reality medical television, religion, surgery, and current topics in bioethics. Her interests recently have expanded to the universal human right to benefit from the progress of science.

== Selected bibliography ==
- Porsdam Mann, S.; Donders, Y.; Mitchell, C.; Bradley, V. J.; Chou, M. F.; Mann, M.; Church, G.; Porsdam, H. (2018). "Opinion: Advocating for science progress as a human right". Proceedings of the National Academy of Sciences. 115 (43): 10820–10823. doi:10.1073/pnas.1816320115. PMC 6205482. PMID 30352870.
- American Society for Bioethics Humanities Clinical Ethics Consultation Affairs Standing Committee; Carrese, J. A.; Antommaria, A. H.; Berkowitz, K. A.; Berger, J.; Carrese, J.; Childs, B. H.; Derse, A. R.; Gallagher, C.; Gallagher, J. A.; Goodman-Crews, P.; Heesters, A.; Jurchak, M.; Mitchell, C.; Mokwyune, N.; Parsi, K.; Powell, T.; Powderly, K. E.; Rosell, T.; Shelton, W.; Smith, M. L.; Spike, J.; Tarzian, A.; Wocial, L. (2012). "HCEC pearls and pitfalls: Suggested do's and don't's for healthcare ethics consultants". The Journal of Clinical Ethics. 23 (3): 234–40. doi:10.1086/JCE201223307. PMID 23256404. S2CID 1848824.
- Truog, Robert D.; Mitchell, Christine (2006). "Futility—From Hospital Policies to State Laws". The American Journal of Bioethics. 6 (5): 19–21. doi:10.1080/15265160600858989. PMID 16997814. S2CID 28379888.
- Mitchell, C.; Truog, R. (2006). "When a village is not enough". The Journal of Clinical Ethics. 17 (1): 79. doi:10.1086/JCE200617110. PMID 16689117. S2CID 42777112.
- Mitchell, C. (2006). "A mother's death: The story of "Margaret's" children". The Journal of Clinical Ethics. 17 (4): 331–2. doi:10.1086/JCE200617407. PMID 17330724. S2CID 42754949.
- Mitchell, C.; Truog, R. D.; Ethics Advisory Committee at Children's Hospital Boston (2004). "Excerpts from the ethics consult report: MT". The Journal of Clinical Ethics. 15 (3): 302–6. doi:10.1086/JCE200415313. PMID 15630874. S2CID 44508413.
- Mitchell, C.; Truog, R. D. (2003). "A bridge to nowhere". The Journal of Clinical Ethics. 14 (3): 189. doi:10.1086/JCE200314306. PMID 14740354.
- Mitchell, C.; Truog, R. (2002). "Irene's story". The Journal of Clinical Ethics. 13 (3): 230–1. doi:10.1086/JCE200213305. PMID 12624890. S2CID 40214881.
- Mitchell, C.; Truog, R. (2002). "Case reports from the Harvard Ethics Consortium". The Journal of Clinical Ethics. 13 (1): 49–53. doi:10.1086/JCE200213105. PMID 12235682. S2CID 31242138.
- American Society for Bioethics Humanities Clinical Ethics Consultation Affairs Standing Committee; Carrese, J. A.; Antommaria, A. H.; Berkowitz, K. A.; Berger, J.; Carrese, J.; Childs, B. H.; Derse, A. R.; Gallagher, C.; Gallagher, J. A.; Goodman-Crews, P.; Heesters, A.; Jurchak, M.; Mitchell, C.; Mokwyune, N.; Parsi, K.; Powell, T.; Powderly, K. E.; Rosell, T.; Shelton, W.; Smith, M. L.; Spike, J.; Tarzian, A.; Wocial, L. (2012). "HCEC pearls and pitfalls: Suggested do's and don't's for healthcare ethics consultants". The Journal of Clinical Ethics. 23 (3): 234–40. doi:10.1086/JCE201223307. PMID 23256404. S2CID 1848824.

== See also ==
- Nursing ethics
- Patient advocacy
- Philosophy of healthcare
- Right to science and culture
