= China Medical Board =

China Medical Board, Inc. (CMB; Chinese: 美国中华医学基金会) is an American foundation whose mission is "to advance health, equity, and the quality of care in China and Southeast Asia."

== History ==
China Medical Board was founded in 1914 as the second major project of the Rockefeller Foundation. With additional endowments from the Rockefeller Foundation, China Medical Board became an independent private foundation in 1928. CMB established Peking Union Medical College, which brought modern Western medical education to China and "quickly became the preeminent medical education and research institution in China." The goal from the outset was full Chinese ownership, operations, and financing. Full Chinese faculty at Peking Union Medical College was essentially achieved in 1950.

In 1951, China Medical Board could not operate in China for political reasons. During this time, China Medical Board focused its attention on advancing public health in other countries in East Asia and Southeast Asia. In 1980, it was invited to resume activities in China and has been a continuous presence in China ever since.

Over the years, China Medical Board has supported 118 medical schools in 17 Asian countries, 28 of which are in China. Its work has focused on capacity building by providing facilities, educational material, laboratories, fellowships, and faculty development. In total, China Medical Board is estimated to have invested $1.5 billion in fostering public health in Asia. Currently, China Medical Board's endowment is valued at over $300 million invested.

== Activities ==
Today, China Medical Board focuses on health professional education, health policy and systems, global health, and leadership development. It works with 24 medical universities throughout China and in parts of Southeast Asia, including Thailand, Vietnam, Laos, and Myanmar. In 2016 it launched The Equity Initiative, a long-term fellowship program committed to nurturing the development of health equity leaders in Southeast Asia. The current president of China Medical Board is Roger I. Glass, MD, PhD.

== See also ==
- Rockefeller Foundation
- Category:Medical schools in China
- Healthcare system reform in the People's Republic of China
- Violence against doctors in China

== Bibliography ==
- Laurie Norris. (2003). The China Medical Board: 50 years of programs, partnerships, and progress, 1950-2000.
- Mary E. Ferguson. (1970). China Medical Board and Peking Union Medical College: A chronicle of fruitful collaboration 1914-1951.
- China Medical Commission of the Rockefeller Foundation, Medicine in China, 1914. full text
- Bowers, John Z. (1972). Western medicine in a Chinese palace: Peking Union Medical College, 1917-1951. The Josiah Macy Jr. Foundation.
- Bullock, Mary Brown. (1980). An American Transplant: The Rockefeller Foundation and Peking Union Medical College. University of California Press. ISBN 0520035593.
- Bullock, Mary Brown. (2011). The Oil Prince's Legacy: Rockefeller Philanthropy in China. Woodrow Wilson Center Press. ISBN 0804776881.
- Andrews, Bridie and Mary Brown Bullock, eds. (2014). Medical Transitions in Twentieth-Century China. Indiana University Press. 978-0-253-01490-0.
- Ryan, Jennifer, Lincoln Chen, and Tony Saich. (2014). Philanthropy for Health in China. Indiana University Press. 978-0-253-01450-4.
- Harper, Tim and Sunil S. Amrith. (2014). Histories of Health in Southeast Asia: Perspectives on the Long Twentieth Century. Indiana University Press. 978-0-253-01491-7.
