= Violence against doctors in China =

Violent incidents towards medical staff in China

Violence against doctors and other medical practitioners in China has been reported as an increasing problem. National Ministry of Health statistics indicate that the number of violent incidents against hospitals and medical staff increased from about 10,000 in 2005 to more than 17,000 in 2010. A survey by the Chinese Hospital Association reported an average of 27.3 assaults per hospital per year in 2012, up from 20.6 assaults per hospital per year in 2006. In 2012, an editorial in The Lancet described the situation as a "crisis" for the practice of medicine in China.

== Causes ==
Since the 2000s in China, violence against doctors has been on the rise, and is a significant threat to the safety of Chinese medical personnel. Doctor-patient relationships in China have also been damaged in recent years.

In today's China, the relationship between medical staff and patients is particularly acute. The causes of violence against doctors in China are closely related to patients, doctors and hospitals, the government's health care system, and incorrect media reports.

As most patients lack medical knowledge, they have to rely on doctors' expertise during the entire treatment process. Patients and their families have mythified the doctor, holding the belief that the doctor would save the patient's life. Facts have proven that no doctor can save every patient, so if trust between patients and medical staff is broken, it may lead to patients' great disappointment towards medical personnel.

This great sense of psychological loss, as well as the life and economic pressure suffered by patients during the treatment, will eventually lead to their violent behavior towards medical personnel. The lack of understanding of medical science and the high expectation of treatment are also critical reasons that could spark violent behaviours. For example, on May 11, 2002, Yuan Xiaoping, a doctor at the First Affiliated Hospital of South China University in Hengyang City, Hunan Province, was attacked and insulted by a violent mob of a hundred people, as parents of the child could not accept the death, causing them to vent their dissatisfaction on the doctor. China has not yet imposed direct punishments on hospitals and doctors. As a result, patients have no places to complain and can only become targets of exploitation. Using violence to vent the heart's dissatisfaction and pressure seems to have become the only feasible way and method. It was not until 2019 that the Chinese government promulgated the "Measures for the Management of Complaints by Medical Institutions," which clarified the methods for patient complaints and regulated hospitals and management departments' behaviour at all levels.

As of 2019, the medical field in China had 10.154 million staff employed, compared to a population of 1.4 billion people. There is also a significant gap in staffing between urban and rural areas. In contrast, in 2018, the U.S. health care and social assistance sector had 20 million employees, compared to a population of 327.2 million. Scholars argue that the uneven training level of medical personnel, which can lead to medical incidents, makes these incidents more likely to occur in rural areas. To protect themselves, Chinese doctors have been known to avoid communicating with patients about their conditions and carefully deal with possible complications and accidents through complex examinations. Due to fear of making mistakes and general mistrust from patients, doctors have been known to organise unnecessary diagnostic tests and treatments. The salary of doctors in China is modest even by Chinese standards, which leads to some doctors breaking the rules in place. For example, doctors commonly accept monetary gifts (red envelopes) from patients.

Public Hospitals in China received full government funding before 1985. After economic reforms, the Hospitals are now receiving very limited financial support from the government, thus forcing them to operate for-profit. Drug and examination costs have become the main means for public hospitals to get profits. Drug sales can even account for 40% of China's public hospital revenue. Higher drug costs and the selection of some high-priced drugs can indeed bring profits to doctors and hospitals, but they greatly increase patients' burden. Patients' dissatisfaction with doctors, caused by inflated drug prices, has become an important reason for the deterioration of doctor-patient relations, especially after its exposure by the media and the government.

After the economic reform, the Chinese government no longer provided sufficient funds to public hospitals. Public hospitals were forced to obtain sufficient funds through commercial operations. The lack of medical and health-related laws, and the interconnection between commercial institutions and government agencies, have created a stable interest chain in China's medical system, making it more difficult for China's medical system to reform. For example, the initial reforms of Sanming around 2012 were opposed by the provincial government and pharmaceutical companies.

Media reports about the relationship between doctors and patients sometimes lack professionalism and have a strong subjective nature. On November 3, 2009, CCTV-2 reported about medical students from Peking University First Hospital treating Xiong Zhuowei. However, Xiong Zhuo died of postoperative complications, and the rescue was ineffective. The reporter did not go through the formal interview procedure but made false reports through unannounced visits by using pinhole cameras. Moreover, the reporter uses subjective attitudes such as "illegal practice" or "unlicensed practice" to criticize the hospital's behaviour, which has made people misunderstand the hospital. Especially in the dispute between the doctor and the patient, the reporter only quoted the patient and her lawyer's remarks from beginning to end, ignoring the hospital's facts and evidence. This incident has also attracted the attention of People.cn, and it has also been reprinted by media with a larger impression such as the South China Morning Post.

=== Yi Nao ===
The phenomenon of Yi Nao (Chinese: 医闹; lit. 'healthcare disturbance') has been identified as a contributing factor in violence against medical personnel. Yi Nao is the organized disturbance against hospitals or medical staff, usually via public humiliation, property damage/vandalism or even violent assault, to obtain compensation for actual or perceived medical malpractice. Yi Nao is usually perpetrated by the patients' family and friends, but there are increasing instances of groups with nefarious interests who actively instigate the patients to commit Yi Nao (similar to ambulance chasers in North America), and in some cases professional scam rioters and even organised crime gangs hired to do the dirty works and to be paid by a percentage of the desired compensation, although such Yi Nao parties may also "solicit" settlements by playing the negotiator.

Yi Nao has been increasing in recent years. A 2013 article in the British Medical Journal describes Yi Nao gangs as consisting "largely of unemployed people with a designated leader. They threaten and assault hospital personnel, damage facilities and equipment, and prevent the normal activities of the hospital." Citing a survey published in 2006 of 270 tertiary hospitals, over 73% of the hospitals reported experiencing Yi Nao. Some cases of Yi Nao even border on hate crime and domestic terrorism. For example, in January 2017, a man in Qichun County, Huanggang City, Hubei province issued an announcement on the Internet saying that he was demanding that Qichun County Third People's Hospital to pay him 1 million yuan, or otherwise, he threatened, "I will kill every medical worker I see in the Third Hospital and burn this hospital down!"

== Response ==
The Chinese Medical Association has issued a statement calling for system-wide reforms to be made. In October 2013 the Ministry of Public Security of the People's Republic of China advised hospitals with over 2,000 beds to hire "at least 100 security guards". However, increased implementation of security guards, metal detectors, and legal threats has been criticised as failing to address the underlying causes of the violence.

The International Business Times reported in November 2013 that hospital personnel at Zhongshan Hospital and Huashan Hospital were learning taekwondo from a martial arts instructor after a chief physician of the head of the otolaryngology department of Wenling Hospital was murdered by an angry patient in October 2013.

Violence against doctors has been cited as one reason for a decrease in the popularity of medicine as a profession.

== See also ==
- Violence against healthcare professionals by country
- Workplace safety in healthcare settings
- Patient-initiated violence
- Ambulance chasing
