= Patient abuse =

Causing harm or suffering to a medical patient

Patient abuse or patient neglect is any action or failure to act which causes unreasonable suffering, misery or harm to the patient. Elder abuse is classified as patient abuse of those older than 60 and forms a large proportion of patient abuse.

- Abuse can be physical such as physically striking or sexually assaulting a patient or psychological. It also includes the intentional withholding of necessary food, physical care, and medical attention.
- Neglect includes the failure to properly attend to the needs and care of a patient, or the unintentional causing of injury to a patient, whether by act or omission.

Patient abuse and neglect may occur in settings such as hospitals, nursing homes, clinics and during home-based care. Health professionals who abuse patients may be deemed unfit to practice and have their medical license removed as well as facing criminal charges as well as civil cases.

Abuse amongst the general adult population has not been well-addressed in literature.

== Forms and individuals affected ==
=== Intellectual disabilities ===
Public scandals involving individuals with intellectual disabilities have regularly occurred in England during the last 50 years, most involving those in residential care.

=== Elder abuse ===
Elder abuse refers to acts or omissions that cause harms to older people. Based on self-report by staff the prevalence of elder abuse in institutional settings such as nursing homes is 64.2%. The prevalence of psychological abuse is 33.4%, physical abuse 14.1%, neglect 11.6%, and sexual abuse 1.9%. Risk factors for abuse were being female, cognitive impairment, and being older than 74.

=== Sexual abuse ===
The rate of sexual abuse in the United States is 9.5 per 10,000 physicians per 10 years.Female and younger patients are more likely to experience sexual abuse and older male doctors who perform examinations in non-academic settings are more likely to perpetrate sexual abuse.

== Boundary violations ==
Therapeutic boundaries refers to limits in the relationships between healthcare workers and patients.

Gabard produced a typology of healthcare practitioners who engage in sexual boundary violations, which includes the predatory practitioner characterised by antisocial personality disorder, masochist-surrender practitioner who disregards norms in order to rescue a patient, the lovesick practitioner, and the narcissistic practitioner.

== Causes ==
=== Institutional abuse ===
Studies propose that a culture of abuse in institutions dealing with those with intellectual disabilities contributes to social isolation of residents, ineffective staff supervision, and a lack of recognition of abuse by staff.

Andrew Phelvin draws comparison between the institutional abuse at the Winterbourne View in the UK and the Iraq Abu Ghraib torture case and Stanford prison experiment citing Philip Zimbardo. He notes the playful nature of abuse amongst staff, the previous good character of the staff, "deviant norms" of the institution and deindividuation of staff. Discussing possible means of prevention, McDonnell et al., identify physical restraint as a potential mediator for the development of an abusive culture and suggest requiring management of organizations to demonstrate how its use is being reduced as well suggesting involving patients in their care and staff debriefing as means of reducing use. They also suggest an approach that pays attention to human rights, and positive risk taking, leadership focused on providing feedback and monitoring good practice rather than administration, reflective practice, and encouraging a "low arousal" environment where staff modify their body language and perception of situations to reduce arousal in an environment.

== History ==
Barbara Robb, a psychotherapist, founded the group Aid for the Elderly in Government Institutions and launched a public campaign to highlight abuse and neglect of older patients in mental health institutions. She published the report Sans Everything: A Case to Answer based on material she received from the public in 1967.

Steve George argues that in the United Kingdom, the killing of Jonathan Zito in 1992 created a narrative of risk posed by mental health patients that reduced concern for abuse of mental health patients.

Between 1983 and 1993 a large number of adults with learning difficulties at the Longcare residential home in Slough were beaten, verbally abused, drugged, indecently assaulted and raped. In interviews conducted as part of an independent government inqury, staff members described an atmosphere of threats where they were encouraged to spy on one another, and with inexperienced workers being hired and experienced healthcare workers leaving the organization.

The Winterbourne View hospital abuse case took place at a hospital for the treatment of individuals with learning difficulties, and was the subject of a BBC Panorama documentary in 2011. Staff abused patients physically and psychologically and there were several instances of serious physical assault. The case resulted in the hospital being closed and 11 of the staff being prosecuted.

In 2019, another BBC Panorama documentary revealed abuse at Whorlton Hall, a treatment unit for those with learning disabilities or autism. Patients were taunted, threatened, provoked, and restrained on the floor for long periods of time. Staff implemented arbitrary punishments like confiscating patient belongings and staff routinely used sexually explicit language and gestures.

In 2022 another BBC investigation found a "toxic culture of humiliation, verbal abuse and bullying" at the Greater Manchester HNS Ednenfield site, resulting in a number of staff sackings.

== See also ==
- Aggression in healthcare
- Blacklisting of patients by doctors
- Bullying in medicine
- Bullying in nursing
- Category:Health care professionals convicted of murdering patients
- Iatrogenesis
- Medical error
- Medical malpractice
- Medical torture
  - Pharmacological torture
- Political abuse of psychiatry
- Unethical human experimentation
- Never events
- Professional abuse
- Foster care § Abuse and negligence
- Whistleblower
- Winterbourne View hospital abuse
- Wrongful involuntary commitment
