= Gabrielle McMullin =

Australian vascular surgeon, author and gender equality advocate

Gabrielle McMullin FRCS FRACS
- Born: 1956 (age 69–70); Uganda
- Occupation: Vascular surgeon
- Known for: Promotion of gender equality in surgical training
- Children: 2

Gabrielle McMullin is an Australian vascular surgeon, author and gender equality advocate.

== Career and personal life ==
She was born in 1956 in Uganda, studied medicine in Ireland then worked in New Zealand, Hong Kong and England before finally settling in Australia where she has worked in the field of vascular surgery. She has a professional interest in chronic leg ulcers. She has published multiple scientific papers.

== Gender equality advocacy ==
She has written one book chapter "Women in Medicine: Sisters doing it for themselves" in Pathways to Gender Equality: The Role of Merit and Quotas. Her notoriety relates mainly to comments she made in 2015 at the launch of this book.

The specific comment which caused the most controversy was "What I tell my trainees is that, if you are approached for sex, probably the safest thing to do in terms of your career is to comply with the request." These comments were widely reported in the Australian media. The initial response included much outrage that a senior female surgeon would ever advise a female surgeon in training to accede to an unwanted sexual advance rather than report it. The Royal Australasian College of Surgeons (RACS) immediately responded with insistence that the correct procedure was to report these incidents for appropriate investigation and that such incidents were rare. After the reports of outrage from some media commentators and initial denials by the RACS of a systemic problem, McMullin responded with specific case histories of surgical trainees who had made complaints which were inappropriately handled. Many had led to the complainant being forced to end surgical training, with the alleged perpetrator going unpunished. McMullin referenced multiple cases that she was aware of that were anonymously confirmed. One of the female surgeons Caroline Tan was prepared to go on the record with her experience with many reporting off-the-record.

=== Response of Royal Australasian College of Surgeons ===
Whilst McMullin's original comments were highly provocative and controversial, they have indirectly led to major changes to governance of surgical training in Australia. A draft report of the RACS found that instead of being rare, 50% of surgical trainees reported bullying (albeit that cultural discrimination was slightly more common than sexual harassment). In 2016, the Royal Australasian College of Surgeons formed an official Diversity and Inclusion plan. Fewer than 15% of active Fellows in surgery in Australia are female as of 2020.

== See also ==
Bullying in medicine
