= Violence against healthcare professionals by country =

Violence against healthcare professionals has occurred in the form of physical violence, verbal abuse, aggressive gestures, blackmail, and cyber-bullying. Violence against doctors, nurses and allied health care professionals has been observed in the United States, Australia, India, China, Pakistan, Nepal, Sri Lanka and others.

Violence against health care workers can also occur during times of civil unrest such as the 2025 Nepalese Gen Z protests.

== Countries ==
=== Australia ===
In 2019, a survey showed that in the last three years, there has been a 48 percent increase in assaults against nurses in Queensland. In New South Wales the acts assaults against nurses increased by 44 percent over the same period.

=== China ===
In China, a 2019 survey by Dingxiang Yuan, a website for healthcare professionals, showed that 85% of doctors had experienced violence in their workplace.

A survey conducted in 2008 found that 80% of healthcare professionals agreed that the doctor–patient relationship was poor or very poor.

The 2014 survey conducted by the Chinese Medical Doctor Association (CMDA) found that the 60% of medical professionals surveyed had faced verbal abuse from patients and their relatives and 13% of the professionals had been physically assaulted and harmed.

=== India ===
The Indian Medical Association has reported that 75% of doctors face verbal or physical abuse in hospital premises and fear of violence was the most common cause for stress for 43% doctors. The highest number of violence was reported at the point of emergency care and 70% of the cases of violence were initiated by the patient's relatives. The incidence of reported violent crimes against doctors in India has been increasing from 2006 to 2017, with the highest violence rate occurring in Delhi, Maharashtra and Uttar Pradesh.

Factors attributed to violence against doctors are: absence of post-graduate training in emergency medicine in India, long working hours of up to 120 hrs a week for doctors, demonisation of doctors in news media and films, poor quality of emergency-care infrastructure, poor mechanism for grievance redressal, delayed legal procedural outcomes, a poor emergency network among hospitals, poor communication skills of healthcare workers, resource poor emergency settings (fewer drugs, fewer facilities for investigations), high patient load, lack of proper training of healthcare staff, high work load, and excessive political interference in hospital affairs. In addition, the high expectations of the public and their perception that all services should be available for free adds to the problem. Unrestricted public access to all areas in government hospitals, coupled with lack of security, surveillance and mob-preventing-drills increase the risk of violence. The decreased civic responsibility showed by the public and the negative image of doctors portrayed in the media are also some factors that result in violence against doctors. At the psychiatry department, the violence of the patients were directed more to nurses than doctors and to women than men.

In a tertiary care hospital in Delhi, 40% of doctors reported being exposed to violence in the last year. The point of delivery of emergency services was the most common place of violence and verbal abuse was the most common form of violence. The most common symptoms experienced by the doctors who were subjected to violence were anger, frustration and irritability. Out of those who were exposed to violence, only 44% reported the incidence to the authorities.

Due to the increasing reports of violence against doctors, the main source of stress for doctors was fear of violence, followed by fear of being sued. In India, 62% of doctors who answered a survey reported that they were unable to see their patients without any fear of violence, and 57% had considered hiring security staff at their workplace.

In May 2023, a junior doctor named Vandana Das was stabbed to death while on night duty, by a patient brought to casualty for medical examination by the Police in a Government hospital in the Indian state of Kerala. The incident sparked widespread outrage and protests by doctors resulting in the Kerala Government passing an ordinance to provide stricter punishment for violence against hospitals and healthcare workers.

On 9 August 2024, a second-year postgraduate trainee (PGT) doctor at RG Kar Medical College in Kolkata, West Bengal, India was found dead in a seminar hall on the college campus. An autopsy later confirmed that she had been raped and murdered. The incident has sparked significant outrage and nationwide protests which demand a thorough investigation while also questioning the safety of women in India.

=== Nepal ===
During the 2025 Nepalese Gen Z protests, police entered the Civil Service Hospital in Kathmandu, firing tear gas, assaulting wounded protesters which were there for treatment, all of which disturbed health care delivery.

=== United States ===
According to the Bureau of Labor Statistics in 2020, the intentional injury rate for private hospital employees was five times higher than the national rate of all other private industries.

A 2018 survey conducted by the American College of Emergency Physicians showed that out of more than 3,500 E.R. doctors, 47% of the doctors had been assaulted. 97% of the time, the assailant was a patient.

== Mitigation ==
Some suggestions for reducing violence against healthcare staff are: posting security personnel at the hospital entrance, confiscation of weapons before entering the hospital, mandatory registration for all visitors at the reception, restricting the number of bystanders to two for every patient, displaying of laws related to punishment for assaulting healthcare staff on the walls of hospitals, creation of an emergency protocol and evacuation plan in case of major violence. Giving training on communication skills for healthcare staff and providing the services of counselors for emotional support could likely reduce violence.

In December 2019 in China, those "disturbing the medical environment, or harming medical workers' safety and dignity" will be subjected to administrative punishments such as detention or a fine under a new law effective from 1 June 2020.

In England, patients who general practitioners accuse of violence or behaviour causing fear of physical violence can be limited to healthcare in settings with mitigation for violence through the Special Allocation Scheme. There is a review process and an appeal process that assesses these allocations.

In the past ten years, nineteen state governments of India have passed laws for the safeguard of physicians. However, the law could not be effectively implemented due to resistance from administration.

== See also ==
- Workplace safety in healthcare settings
- Patient-initiated violence
