= Psychiatric emergency room =

Specialized emergency room

A psychiatric emergency room is a specialized emergency room, or, more commonly, a specialized unit within a larger, general emergency room, for the care of people with acute psychiatric needs.

== Needs ==
People using the psychiatric emergency room often have a mood disorder, schizophrenia, or substance use disorder. About 20% are suicidal, and 10% are violent. Almost half are admitted to the hospital from the psychiatric emergency room. Other people need extended observation (up to 72 hours), until the worst of their symptoms have subsided, and they can return to outpatient care.

They may have gone to the psychiatric emergency room directly, have been sent there by outpatient healthcare providers, or brought in by parents, police, or others.

== Purpose ==
A psychiatric emergency room has several purposes, including:

- saving people's lives by preventing suicide, homicide, and violence;
- diagnosing the cause of the behavioral symptoms, which could be medical (e.g., delirium) or psychiatric; and
- providing or arranging for any needed treatment (e.g., admission or medication).

== Design ==
A purpose-built psychiatric emergency room is designed to meet the needs of the intended users. Because of the higher proportion of suicidal and violent people, objects that could be used for self-harm, to attack staff or others, or to block doorways are removed or secured. For example, chairs may be bolted to the floor, so that they cannot be thrown at someone. Staff–patient interactions happen where other staff or trained security guards can see what is happening and intervene when necessary.

Procedures are also designed with safety in mind. For example, staff normally sit close to the door of a patient exam room, so they can escape the patient exam room if necessary. The hospital's protocol may require that at least two staff members be present during the initial assessment. Staff are discouraged from wearing or carrying items (e.g., earrings, pens, hot drinks) that could be grabbed or used to injure someone. Similarly, police officers are generally not allowed to carry a loaded firearm in a psychiatric unit.

== Operation ==
Psychiatric emergency rooms often have overcrowding and long wait times due to a higher demand compared to the provision of space, staff, and services. These factors can increase the risk of patient-initiated violence. Telepsychiatry is one way to get people evaluated by a psychiatrist more quickly.
