= Winterbourne View hospital abuse =

Institutional abuse of patients in England

The Winterbourne View hospital inquiry occurred at Winterbourne View, a private hospital at Hambrook, South Gloucestershire, England, owned and operated by Castlebeck. A Panorama investigation, broadcast on television in 2011, exposed the physical and psychological abuse suffered by people with learning disabilities and challenging behaviour at the hospital.

Castlebeck was owned by Lydian Capital Partners, an investment firm based in Geneva and backed by a consortium including three Irish billionaires: Denis Brosnan, Dermot Desmond and J.P. McManus.

Local social services and the English national regulator (Care Quality Commission) had received various warnings but the mistreatment continued. One senior nurse, Terry Bryan, reported his concerns to the management at Winterbourne View and to CQC, but his complaint was not taken up.

The publicly funded hospital was shut down as a result of the abuse that took place. Another similar Castlebeck unit in Bristol was closed in August 2011 "for operational reasons" and a third, Arden Vale (near Coventry) was closed by agreement with the Care Quality Commission in August 2011.

== Abuse ==
The undercover footage showed staff repeatedly assaulting and harshly restraining patients under chairs. Staff gave one patient cold showers as a punishment, left her outside in near freezing temperatures, and later poured mouthwash into her eyes. They pulled patients' hair and forced medication into their mouths. Victims were shown screaming and shaking; one patient was seen trying to jump out of a second-floor window to escape the torment, and was mocked by staff members afterwards. Another patient was repeatedly poked in the eyes.

A clinical psychologist who reviewed the footage described the abuse as "torture".

== Reaction ==
On 21 June 2011, 86 people and organisations wrote to the Prime Minister, David Cameron, about the revelations: "We are aware of the various actions currently being taken within and outside government – such as the DH review and CQC internal inquiry. We hope to make submissions to those both individually and collectively. However, on their own these will not be enough and a clear programme is needed to achieve change." Cameron responded by saying he was "appalled" at the "catalogue of abuses" uncovered by the BBC TV series Panorama.

In June 2011 the Association of Supported Living issued a press statement, which was followed up in writing to every member of parliament in the United Kingdom, calling for community based supported living services to replace institutional services for people with learning disabilities.

The Daily Telegraph said, "It is impossible to read the details of what went on at Winterbourne View, a care home for the severely disabled in Gloucestershire, without feeling repelled. In the wake of an exposé from the BBC's Panorama, 11 members of staff were convicted of almost 40 charges of neglect and ill treatment of those in their care."

== Systemic failings ==
The national regulator, the CQC did a nationwide check on facilities owned by the same company, Castlebeck Care, and as a result three more institutions were closed. The CQC reported a "systemic failure to protect people or to investigate allegations of abuse" and said that Castlebeck Care had "misled" the health watchdog.

The CQC also came under criticism for failing to respond to early warnings of abuse at the care home. It initially blamed Winterbourne managers who, the CQC said, "effectively misled us by not keeping us informed about incidents". However, it later emerged that managers had officially alerted the CQC to numerous allegations of staff abusing patients, dating back to February 2008, which were also reported to the police, but did not lead to any convictions.

== Investigations ==
The CQC also inspected 132 similar institutions and a Serious Case Review was commissioned – some of the roughly ten local and national enquiries were carried out to examine what went wrong, including one by NHS Southwest which was one of the first to be published and list many of the others. The head of the Care Quality Commission resigned ahead of a critical government report, a report in which Winterbourne View was cited. Mencap published a report warning that similar abuse could be going on elsewhere, and calling for the closure of all large institutions far from patients' families.

== Convictions ==
Eleven people pleaded guilty to criminal offences of neglect or abuse as a result of evidence from Undercover Care, and six of them were jailed. Immediately after the eleventh person pleaded guilty, the Serious Case Review was published, revealing hundreds of previous incidents at the hospital, and warnings that were missed.

== Media ==
The BBC programme Panorama produced an investigation documentary depicting the violations at Winterbourne View Hospital titled "Undercover Care: The Abuse Exposed".

== See also ==
- Disability abuse
- Institutional abuse
- Patient abuse
- Stafford Hospital scandal
