= Healthcare reform in China =

Overview article

The healthcare reform in China refers to the previous and ongoing healthcare system transition in modern China. China's government, specifically the National Health and Family Planning Commission (formerly the Ministry of Health), plays a leading role in these reforms. Reforms focus on establishing public medical insurance systems and enhancing public healthcare providers, the main component in China's healthcare system. In urban and rural areas, three government medical insurance systems—Urban Residents Basic Medical Insurance, Urban Employee Basic Medical Insurance, and the New Rural Co-operative Medical Scheme—cover almost everyone. Various public healthcare facilities, including county or city hospitals, community health centers, and township health centers, were founded to serve diverse needs. Current and future reforms are outlined in Healthy China 2030.

== Current health care institutions ==
Healthcare services in China are primarily provided by state-owned hospitals. State-owned hospitals provide services for approximately 90% of patients in China. State-owned hospitals are larger than private hospitals and have better physicians and medical equipment. The government regulates the price of services and wages for state-owned hospital personnel.

Health insurance is primarily operated by local governments.

== General Guidelines ==
=== Healthy China 2020 ===
In October 2009, Chen Zhu, head of the Ministry of Health, declared the pursuit of Healthy China 2020, a program to provide universal healthcare access and treatment for all of China by 2020, mostly by revised policies in nutrition, agriculture, food, and social marketing. Much of the program centers on chronic disease prevention and promoting better lifestyle choices and eating habits. It especially targets public awareness for obesity, physical inactivity, and poor dietary choices. Healthy China 2020 focuses the most on urban, populous areas that are heavily influenced by globalization and modernity. Additionally, much of the program is media-run and localized and concentrates on change through the community rather than local laws. Many of the aims of Healthy China 2020 are concentrated to more-urban areas under Western influences. Diet is causing obesity issues, and an influx of modern transportation is negatively affecting urban environments and thus health.

In 2011, it was implemented the Children's Development Program of China with the aim to lower children's mortality and the under 5 mortality rate to 10 and 13 per 1000 live births, respectively. Five years later, their values were reduced to 5 and 5.7 per 1000 infants, but without taking into account the mortality due to withdrawing treatment for critically ill children in respect of which there existed no relevant legislative provisions in China.

=== Healthy China 2030 ===
In October 2016, after Communist Party general secretary Xi Jinping and premier Li Keqiang's relevant theme speech at China National Health and Well-being conference in Beijing, China National Health and Family Planning Commission issued the Healthy China 2030 Planning Outline, the most recent comprehensive framework on the goals and plans of its healthcare reform.

The strategic theme of Healthy China 2030 is "co-building, sharing and health for all". The project aims to achieve these key goals by 2030: continuous improve in people's health conditions, raise life expectancy to 79, effective control on main health-endangering factors, substantial improve in health service, notable expansion in health industry, establishment of inclusive health-improving regulatory systems. Specific actions include: enhancing health education in schools, promoting healthy lifestyle, encouraging exercise, enhancing universal healthcare access, improve service quality of healthcare providers, special attention to the elderly, women, children and disabled, reforms in health insurance, pharmaceutical and medical instruments systems, etc.

== Medical insurance reforms ==
=== Rural Co-operative Medical Scheme (1950–1980s) ===
After 1949, the Chinese Communist Party (CCP) took control of China, and the Ministry of Health effectively controlled China's health care system and policies. Under the Chinese government, the country's officials, rather than local governments, largely determined access to health care. Rural areas saw the biggest need for healthcare reform, and the Rural Co-operative Medical Scheme (RCMS) was established as a three-tier system for rural healthcare access. The RCMS functioned on a pre-payment plan that consisted of individual income contribution, a village collective welfare Fund, and subsidies from higher government.

The first tier consisted of barefoot doctors, who were trained in basic hygiene and traditional Chinese medicine. The system of barefoot doctors was the easiest form of healthcare access, especially in rural areas. Township health centers were the second tier of the RCMS, consisting of small, outpatient clinics that primarily hired medical professionals that were subsidized by the Chinese government. Together with barefoot doctors, township health centers were utilized for most common illnesses. The third tier of the CMS, county hospitals, was for the most seriously ill patients. They were primarily funded by the government but also collaborated with local systems for resources (equipment, physicians, etc.). Public health campaigns to improve environmental and hygienic conditions were also implemented, especially in urban areas.

The RCMS has significantly improved life expectancy and simultaneously decreased the prevalence of certain diseases. For example, life expectancy has almost doubled (from 35 to 69 years), and infant mortality has been slashed from 250 deaths to 40 deaths for every 1000 live births. Also, the malaria rate has dropped from 5.55% of the entire Chinese population to 0.3% of the population. The increase in health has been from both the central and local government and community efforts to increase good health. Campaigns sought to prevent diseases and halt the spread of agents of disease like mosquitoes causing malaria. Attempts to raise public awareness of health were especially emphasized.

Due to Mao Zedong's support, the RCMS saw its rapidest expansion during Cultural Revolution, reaching a peak of covering 85% of the total population in 1976. However, as a result of agricultural sector reform and end of People's Commune in the 1980s, the RCMS lost its economic and organizational basis. Therefore, RCMS collapsed, with only 9.6% coverage in 1984.

== Healthcare Provider Reforms ==
=== Changes in hospitals (2010–present) ===
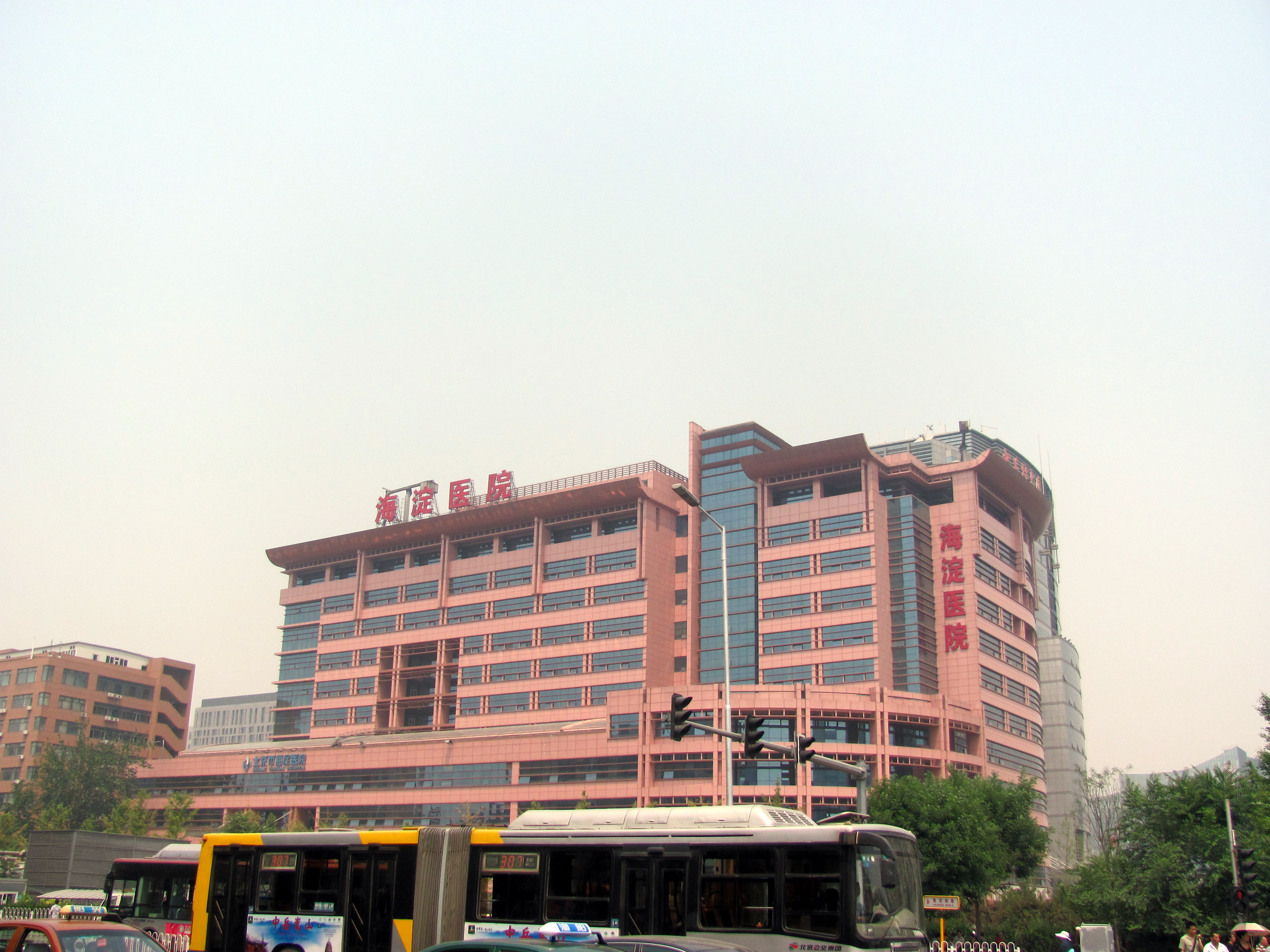
Haidian Hospital, Beijing

In China, public hospitals are considered the most important health facilities, providing both outpatient and inpatient care. They also bear major teaching, training and research responsibilities. Most hospitals are located in cities.

However, several problems posts challenges to accessible and affordable hospital healthcare. To begin with, prices of medicine are set unreasonably high to make up for low service price. Doctors are also dissatisfied about their income. Secondly, great tension in patient-doctor relationships sometimes causes conflicts or even violence against doctors (yinao). Furthermore, patients are not distributed by seriousness among hospitals and lower health facilities, which leads to over-consumption of high-level medical resources in hospitals.

The aim of hospital reforms is to maintain the social welfare nature of public hospitals and encourage them to perform public service functions, thereby providing accessible and affordable healthcare services for the people. Reforms started as pilot in 2010 in 16 cities. In 2015, a new version of guidelines came out and extra attention is given to county-level hospitals. In 2017, public hospital reforms expanded with focus on eliminating drug price difference between hospital pharmacies and wholesales.

Various studies have shown mixed results on the effectiveness of the results. Case survey found that reforms in compensation systems increased service quantity and quality, but caused drastic drop in management efficiency. Regional evidence showed that total out-of-pocket expenditure actually increased, despite the decrease in inpatient medications. Health staff's job satisfaction increased while exposed to higher pressure and overtime working.

=== Changes in other healthcare providers ===
Apart from public hospitals, numerous grass-root public health facilities and private healthcare providers also play their unique role in providing healthcare services. Reforms on grass-root facilities focus on their cooperation and responsibility distribution between hospitals, motivate and compensate grass-level health personnel. Private parties are encouraged to provide medical service and cooperate with public sectors. Doctors at state-owned hospitals are permitted to take part-time work at private hospitals under the reasoning that this will both raise the quality of care at private hospitals and provide doctors with the ability to earn extra income.

Since 2010, the State Council has encouraged investment in private clinics, nursing homes, and hospitals. The number of private hospitals has increased significantly since. Nonetheless, as of at least 2022, state-owned hospitals continue to be the primary health care providers and service 90% of patients in China.

== Pharmaceutical reforms ==
=== Essential Drug List (2009–present) ===
In 2009, State Council started the Essential Drug System (EDS) and published the first version of the Essential Drug List (EDL) listing 307 types of drugs. All grass-root healthcare facilities are required to prepare, use and sell listed drugs almost exclusively. Price of drugs are negotiated by regional government and drug producers while they are sold at zero profit at grass-root facilities. Reimbursement rate for ED is set notably higher. EDL is subject to change according to needs and drug development.

However, in 2015, State Council changed its regulations to deter local governments from expanding EDL. Analysis pointed out that local governments' power in adding new drugs to their EDL is prone to rent-seeking behaviors and protectionism for local medicine industry. Besides, the new guideline removed the restriction of using unlisted drugs, as this regulation caused in shortage of drugs in grass-root facilities.

Opinions on EDS varies. Mckinsey survey in 2013 found that over 2 thirds top executives from multinational drug companies expected EDS would have negative effect on their business. Studies suggested changes in drug selection process.

== Cooperation with outside ==
=== World Bank Health VIII project ===
An example of a reform model based on an international partnership approach was the Basic Health Services Project. The project was the 8th World Bank project in China, and was implemented between 1998 and 2007 by the Government of China in 97 poor rural counties in which 45 million people live. The project aimed to encourage local officials to test innovative strategies for strengthening their health service to improve access to competent care and reduce the impact of major illness. Instead of focusing on eradicating a specific disease, as previous World Bank projects had done, the Health Services Project was a general attempt to reform healthcare. Both the supply (medical facilities, pharmaceutical companies, professionals) and demand (patients, rural citizens) side of medicine were targeted. In particular, the project supported county implementers to translate national health policy into strategies and actions meaningful at a local level. The project saw mixed results. While there was an increase in subsidies from the government, which was able to reduce out-of-pocket spending for residents, there was no statistically significant improvement in health indicators (reduced illness, etc.).

== Policy implications ==
With China managing major health system reform against a background of rapid economic and institutional change, the Institute of Development Studies, an international research institute, outlines policy implications based on collaborative research around the Chinese approach to health system development. A comparison of China's healthcare to other nations shows that the organization of healthcare is crucial to its implementation. There is some disorganization and inequity in access to healthcare in urban and rural areas, but the overall quality of healthcare has not been drastically affected. Certain incentives, such as adjusting prices of medical equipment and medicine, have helped improve health care to an extent. The largest barrier to improvement in healthcare is a lack of unity in policies in each county. The Institute of Development Studies suggests testing innovations at the local level, encouraging learning from success, and gradually building institutions that support new ways of doing things. It suggests that analysts from other countries and officials in organizations supporting international health need to understand that approach if they are to strengthen mutual learning with their Chinese counterparts.

== Public opinion ==
Though life expectancy in China has increased and infant mortality decreased since initial healthcare reform efforts, there is dissonance in quality of healthcare. Studies on public reception of the quality of China's healthcare in more rural Chinese provinces shows continued gaps in understanding between what is available in terms of medical care and affordability of healthcare. There continues to be a disparity between the quality of healthcare in rural and urban areas. Quality of care between private and publicly funded facilities differs, and private clinics are more frequented in some rural areas due to better service and treatment. In fact, a study by Lim, et al. showed that in the rural Chinese provinces of Guangdong, Shanxi, and Sichuan, 33% of rural citizens in these provinces utilize private clinics as opposed to governmentally funded hospitals. The study showed that it was not so much the availability and access to health care for citizens, as it was the quality of the public health care people were receiving that drove them to opt for private clinics instead. The continued lack of health insurance, especially in the majority of rural provinces (where 90% of people in these rural provinces lack health insurance) demonstrates a continued gap in health equality.

== Challenges ==
Many minority groups are still facing challenges in gaining equality in healthcare access. Due to the 1980s health reform, there has been a general increase in government health subsidies, but even still, individual spending on health has also increased. A disparity in inequality between urban and rural areas persists, since much of recent government reform is focused on urban areas. Despite efforts by the NRCMS to combat this inequality, it is still difficult to provide universal healthcare to rural areas. To add to this rural inequality, much of the elderly population lives in rural areas and face even more difficulties in accessing healthcare, and remains uninsured.

Like minority groups, health policy makers are also faced with challenges. First, a system that keeps basic wages low, but allows doctors to make money from prescriptions and investigations, leads to perverse incentives and inefficiency at all levels. Second, as in many other countries, to develop systems of health insurance and community financing which will allow coverage for most people is a huge challenge when the population is aging and treatments are becoming more sophisticated and expensive. This is true especially in China, with the demographic transition model encouraging a larger aging population with the one-child policy. Several different models have been developed across the country to attempt to address the problems, such as more recent, local, community-based programs.

== See also ==
- Health care reform
- Health insurance
- Health Insurance Innovations
- Health care system
- Health in China
- Healthcare reform
- Journal of Health Care for the Poor and Underserved
- Medical savings account
- Migration in China
- Social structure of China
- Two-tier health care
- Universal health care
- Violence against doctors in China
