= Royal Australasian College of Surgeons =

Leading advocate for surgical standards in Australia and New Zealand

The Royal Australasian College of Surgeons
- College coat of arms, granted in 1931

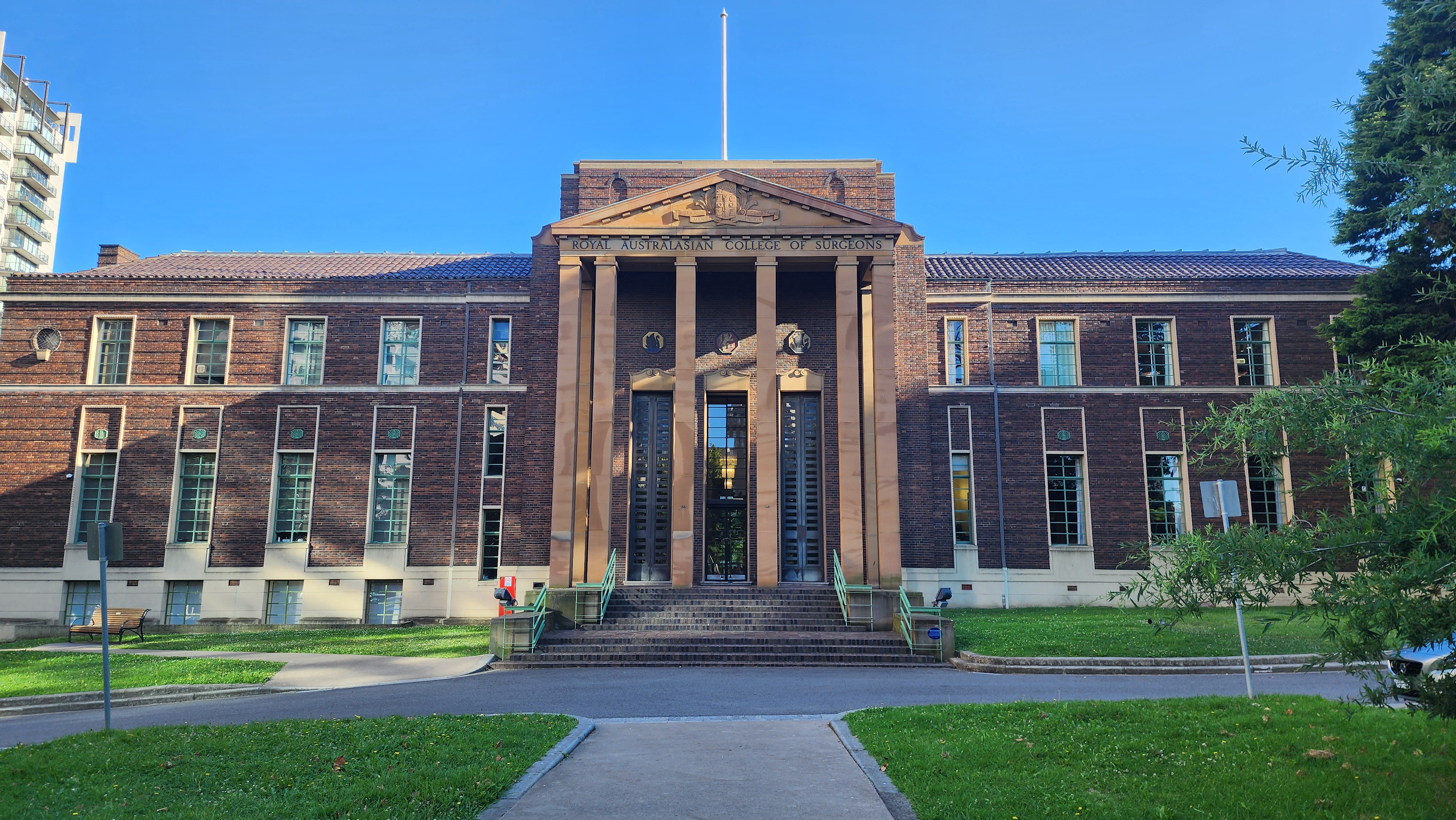
- Royal Australasian College of Surgeons building, south façade
- Abbreviation: RACS
- Formation: 1927; 99 years ago
- Headquarters: Melbourne, Australia
- Location: Australia
- Region served: Australia, New Zealand & Asia-Pacific region
- Official language: English
- President: Associate Professor Kerin Fielding
- Website: https://www.surgeons.org

The Royal Australasian College of Surgeons (RACS) is the leading advocate for surgical standards, professionalism and surgical education in Australia and New Zealand.

Known by its common acronym RACS, it is a not-for-profit organisation, supports the ongoing development and maintenance of expertise during the lifelong learning that accompanies surgical practice of more than 7,000 surgeons and 1,300 surgical trainees and International Medical Graduates. In conjunction with the Australian Government, RACS also provides global surgery outreach by supporting healthcare and surgical education in the Asia-Pacific region and is a substantial funder of surgical research.

== Description ==
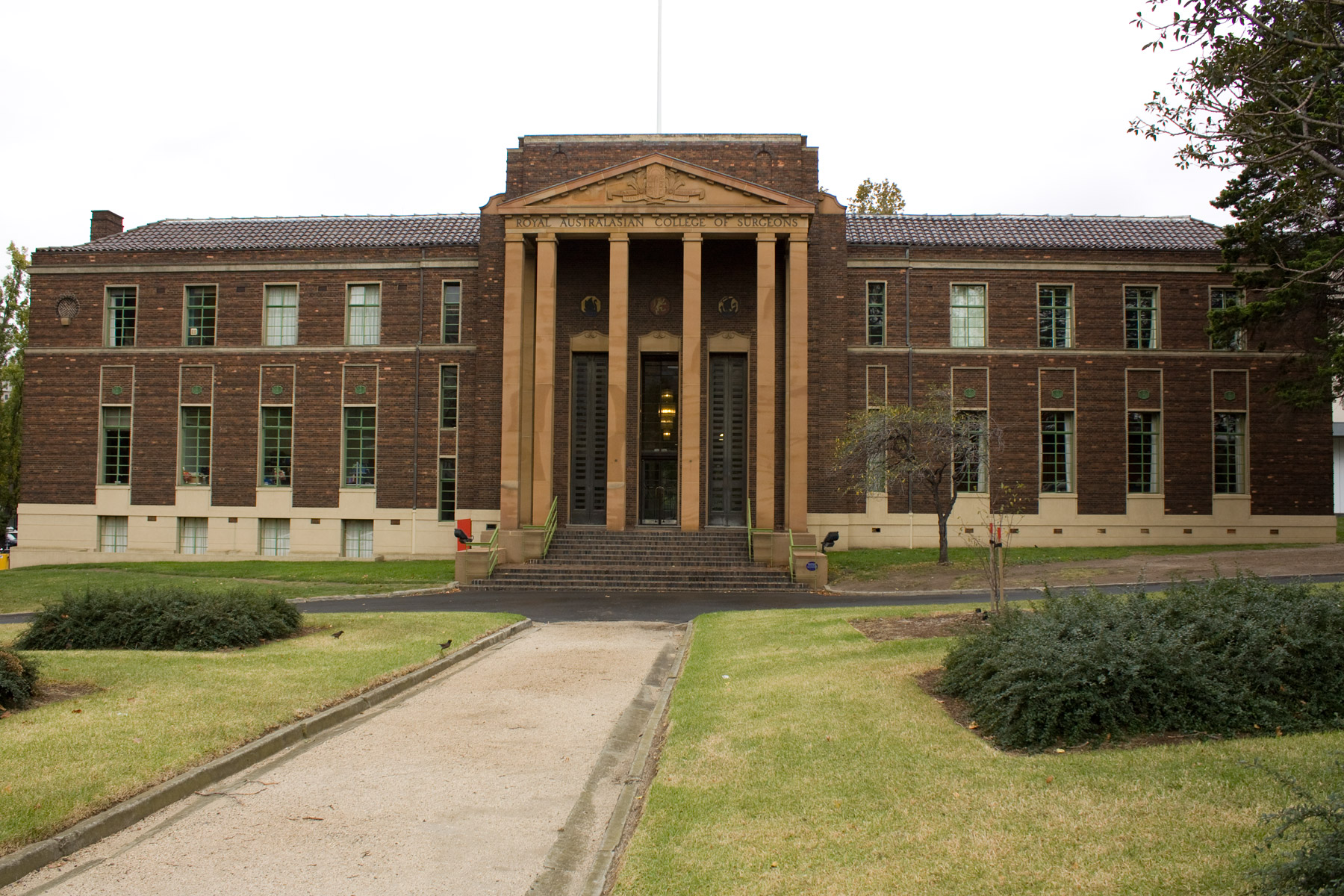

The RACS is authorised and accredited by the Australian Medical Council on behalf of the Medical Board of Australia, and the Medical Council of New Zealand to conduct training and education of surgeons across nine surgical specialties in Australia and New Zealand: cardiothoracic surgery, general surgery, neurosurgery, orthopaedic surgery, otorhinolaryngology (head and neck surgery), paediatric surgery, plastic and reconstructive surgery, urology and vascular surgery. Training is administered in conjunction with specialist societies in each of these areas. Successful completion of surgical training with RACS earns the award of Fellowship of the Royal Australasian College of Surgeons, denoted by the letters FRACS.

Being a Fellow of RACS (FRACS) requires ongoing learning and maintenance of knowledge and skills demonstrated through Continuing Professional Development (CPD) programs.

== Fellowship and specialist registration ==
In Australia, specialist registration with the Australian Health Practitioner Regulation Agency (AHPRA) and Medical Board of Australia as a surgeon is only possible via training with or recognition by the RACS, which has previously sparked controversy over the potential for anti-competitive behaviour.

Procedural medical practitioners with overlapping interests, such as cosmetic doctors, have claimed that the RACS has monopolised surgical training, whilst long-running concerns also exist that doctors without RACS surgical training are misleading and potentially harming the public by representing themselves as specialist surgeons. In Australia, the word "surgeon" alone is not a protected title under law, however misrepresentation as an AHPRA-registered surgical specialist is prohibited.

== Philanthropy ==
RACS has been an active supporter of community health initiatives for several decades. This support has been enabled through the contributions of governments, Fellows, Trainees, IMGs and friends of RACS through the Foundation for Surgery, the philanthropic arm of the organisation.

RACS also provides specialist medical education, training, capacity development and medical aid to 18 countries in the Asia-Pacific region. Visiting teams and in-country personnel provide clinical mentoring and education to the national medical workforces and deliver train-the-trainer programs.

== Museum and archive ==
The college maintains a museum and archive of historic items related to the history of surgery in Australia including instruments, artworks, rare and historic books, and memorabilia. It is open to the public.

== Equity and inclusion ==
The RACS was rocked by a scandal in 2015 when Sydney vascular surgeon Gabrielle McMullin claimed during a speech that for the sake of their careers it would be safer for female surgical trainees to "comply with requests for sex from their supervisors" than to refuse and report these requests. She later backed these claims with evidence that she had reported sexual harassment of trainees to the college and that the reports were ignored.

Her comments were highly provocative and controversial, but prompted a major bullying and harassment investigation by RACS that spanned several years. In 2016, the RACS published an official Diversity and Inclusion plan. Fewer than 15% of active Fellows in surgery in Australia are female with a variety of plans to improve representation.

== Arms ==
Coat of arms of the Royal Australasian College of Surgeons
| Notes The arms were designed by two surgeons of the college, Sir Alan Newton and Sir Hugh Devine, both of whom later served as college presidents. The latin motto was chosen for the college by antiquarian, E. Wilson Dobbs. Adopted Granted by the Kings of Arms, 30 January 1931. Crest On a Wreath Or and Azure, in front of the Sun's rays Or a Sphinx affrontee proper winged Gold. Helm A closed Helmet. Escutcheon Quarterly Or and Argent, on a Cross Gules between in the first and fourth quarters a Swan Sable naiant on water proper and in the second and third quarters a Lymphad also Sable, a Torch in pale of the first between two Serpents embowed respectant in fess proper, on a chief Azure, a Sun rising Gold. Supporters On the dexter side a representation of Chiron, and on the sinister side a representation of Apollo both proper. Compartment A field of Grass Vert. Other elements Mantling Azure doubled Or. Symbolism Supporters: The centaur Chiron from Greek mythology is representative of wisdom, and he holds a bow which represents the protection of education. Apollo, the Greek god of healing, holds the harp, symbolising the instilling of education by gentle means. Escutcheon: The Black swan is taken from the coat of arms of Australia, while the Lymphad, a symbol of discovery, is taken from the Coat of Arms of New Zealand. The red Cross of St George is symbolic of the English origins of the college. The two gold serpents are classical symbols of healing and medicine (such as their appearance in the Rod of Asclepius), and in circular Ouroboros form they represent regeneration and everlasting life. The gold torch is symbolic of enlightenment and learning. The rising sun alludes to the Royal status of the college and is an appropriate symbol for a college based in the Eastern Hemisphere. Crest: Unusually, the crest features a Sphinx affronté, rather than following the heraldic tradition of being in profile to match the helmet. The Sphinx itself is a combination of two ancient versions: the Greek (a woman's head and torso, and eagle's wings on a lion's body), and the Egyptian (a male head with headdress on a lion's body). |
