= Disruptive physician =

Physician whose behaviour upsets patients or other staff

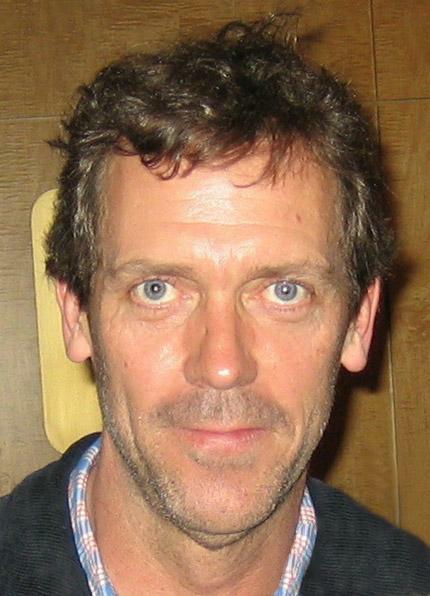
In the medical drama, House, actor Hugh Laurie played a brilliant but obnoxious prima donna who would today be characterised as a disruptive physician.

A disruptive physician is a physician whose obnoxious behaviour upsets patients or other staff. The American Medical Association defines this in their code of medical ethics as "personal conduct, whether verbal or physical, that negatively affects or that potentially may affect patient care". These behaviors are also noted as causing adverse effects such as morale, focus and concentration, team work, collaboration and communication. Starting in 2009, The Joint Commission which accredits hospitals in the United States requires them to have a written code of conduct addressing this issue. This code of conduct defines acceptable, disruptive, and unacceptable behavior in the workplace. Along with these definitions of behaviors the Joint Commission also wrote ways to manage these behaviors in order to fix them.

Simon Sebag Montefiore has reported a remarkable tendency for doctors to become tyrannical dictators. Historical examples include:

- Bashar al-Assad
- Hastings Banda
- François "Papa Doc" Duvalier
- Félix Houphouët-Boigny
- Radovan Karadžić
- William Walker

== See also ==
- Bullying in medicine
- Doc Martin
- Medical drama
- Medical malpractice
- The No Asshole Rule
