= Bullying in nursing =

Type of bullying

The nursing organization workplace has been identified as one in which workplace bullying occurs quite frequently. It is thought that relational aggression (psychological aspects of bullying such as gossiping and intimidation) are relevant. Relational aggression has been studied amongst girls but rarely amongst adult women. According to a finding, 74% of the nurses, 100% of the anesthetists, and 80% of surgical technologists have experienced or witnessed uncivil behaviors like bullying by nursing faculty. There have been many incidents that have occurred throughout the past couple of years. OSHA, which stands for "Occupational Safety and Health Administration" stated that from 2011 to 2013, the United States healthcare workers experienced 15,000 to 20,000 significant injuries while in the workplace (ECRI, 2017, para. 4).

Various bullying permutations are possible, such as:

- doctor or management bullying a nurse
- nurse bullying another nurse (ie, horizontal hostility)
- nurse bullying a patient
- patient bullying a nurse
- nurse bullying other healthcare providers

One study showed that 25% of registered nurses had reported physical abuse by a patient or their family members while more than 50% of nurses have reported exposure to verbal abuse. In 2019, there was also a study conducted on the presence of verbal abuse in nursing and this study concluded that 42.9% of nurses were exposed to this. This proves that this is an ongoing concern in the nursing field. As stated before, the statement goes into a more depth explanation of what nurses are dealing with in their everyday work lives. The main problem in the nursing world that is currently trying to be solved is the issue of nurse abuse. Taking care of patients during vulnerable times of their lives can lead to an increase in the risk of workplace violence. This gives us a reason as to why nurses are dealing with violence at work. Years ago this is not an issue that would have been brought up due to people not talking about it.

There was a lot of research done on healthcare workers and the abuse that they are dealing with at work. Across all of the studies in the different articles, studies were taken on how many nurses are dealing with abuse in their everyday lives. Some of the studies lead to the side effects that the nurses deal with due to workplace violence. All studies were done by professional researchers and the data found was based on nurses. Between the articles the researchers all agree that nurse abuse is an issue that needs to be dealt with, so there is no disagreement.

== Bullying acts ==
The following are identified as bullying acts in nursing:

- undermining of work
- disadvantaging the target
- physical abuse (rare)
- verbal abuse
- isolating individuals
- interfering in work practices
- continual criticism
- sarcasm
- demeaning
- destroying confidence
- fabricating complaints (false accusations)
- setting up to fail
- racial harassment
- psychological harassment
- threatening behavior or actions
- destroying self-esteem
- biased reporting
- indebting to superior
- exploitation
- sexual harassment

Such acts are frequently insidious, continuing over periods of time that may be years. Bullies are often serial bullies. The bullies are invariably aware of the damage they are doing. They undertake such actions basically to gain control and power.

According to Pariona (2020), between 60 and 90 percent of nurses have to deal with physical or verbal abuse at some point in their work-life (p. 1). This just shows people how much nurses deal with abuse daily at work. Whereas, Havaei (2020) mentions that since patients do not know how to express their emotions it might lead to violent and aggressive attacks on their nurses"(p. 2). Not that this is an excuse for patients to get violent towards their nurses, it does explain why it happens in some situations. The patient's emotions are not an excuse for how they treat their nurses. No nurse should have to go to work worried about being verbally or physically abused.

== Causes ==
According to various studies, possible causes of bullying may include the following:

- insufficient staff
- stressful situations
- unfavorable condition in a patient
- use of alcohol
- poor enforcement of policies

== Incivility ==
Workplace incivility can have a tremendous impact on the quality of nursing care. This can cause stress on nurses, and can cause them to have job dissatisfaction. Laschinger, Leiter, Day, and Gilin found that among 612 staff nurses, 67.5% had experienced incivility from their supervisors and 77.6% had experienced incivility from their coworkers. Rude remarks from a patient or family member can distract healthcare professionals and cause them to make mistakes and provide suboptimal healthcare. A study done by Kanitha and Naik found that 91% of nurses who experience workplace incivility are females, and that 77% of nurses have experienced incivility in their workplace.

== Bullying of nurses by managers ==
The bullying of nurses by their managers is called hierarchical violence, wherein a person of power bullies a less powerful person. An example of this would be a manager to a staff nurse. Often, this occurs with the main purpose of disempowering the person in lesser power. Hierarchical violence involves frequent, intentional humiliating and destructive actions toward a person. According to a study done by Ebrahimi, this can include:

- verbal abuse
- humiliation
- excessive criticism
- sarcasm
- intimidation
- denial of access to opportunities
- discouragement

In 2003, the Community Practitioners' and Health Visitors' Association in the UK carried out a survey showing that half of the health visitors, school nurses and community nurses working in the National Health Service (NHS) have been bullied by their managers. One in three of the 563 people questioned said the bullying was so bad they had to take time off work. Constant criticism and humiliation were the most common complaints. Others said they were shouted at or marginalised. During Ebrahimi's study done in 2017, it was found that a majority of nurses, typically new graduate nurses, experience some type of bullying by someone in a greater power of position to them.

Nurses deal with abuse from their leaders in the workplace as well as their patients. When bullying is allowed in the workplace, it can lead to workplace burnout and complications between coworkers.

== Dealing with abuse ==
Dealing with abuse can lead to professionals not wanting to come to work. Researchers have found out that 13% of missed workdays are because of workplace violence and how it could affect the quality of care that the patients are getting. Another major effect of the abuse is that the nurses are getting very burnt out. Burnout occurs by being mentally exhausted and detached with negative attitudes towards work. It has also been found that 1/3 of the nurses that endure some type of mistreatment end up suffering a physical health consequence.

== Consequences ==
Not only does incivility in nursing has a negative influence on the well-being of staff, the delivery of quality care, and the culture of safety, but also contributes to the nursing faculty shortage. There is an increase in nurses' dissatisfaction in their jobs, which is contributing to the ongoing struggle with nurses leaving faculty positions and taking early retirement. Therefore, it is necessary for all healthcare faculty members to have a clear understanding of the cause and effect of incivility and possible strategies to reduce incivility rate. The possible consequences of workplace violence for nurses includes:

- impacted health: mental, psychological, emotional, physical, and social
- anxiety and/or depression
- loss of appetite
- weight loss/gain
- nausea or vomiting
- insomnia and/or nightmares
- menstrual disturbances
- feelings of shame, helplessness, and/or isolation
- loss of self esteem
- feeling unsafe at work
- shorter employment duration
- reduced work performance
- feeling unsafe
- resentment of higher authority
- injuries

== Nurse bullying inventory ==
In order to further investigate and understand the impact of workplace bullying on the nursing work environment, an inventory was developed to address specific workplace bullying constructs within the nursing context.

== Remedial action ==
Some health organizations are seeking to educate staff and health care team members on how to improve social interactions, proper business etiquette, and foster positive people skills in the work environment. Nurses are entitled to monetary compensation for experiencing bullying.

== See also ==
- Aggression in healthcare
- Bullying in medicine
- Emotional labor
- Patient abuse
- Workplace bullying
- Workplace incivility
