= Nursing ethics =

Branch of applied ethics concerned with the field of nursing

Nursing ethics is a branch of applied ethics that concerns itself with activities in the field of nursing. Nursing ethics shares many principles with medical ethics, such as beneficence, non-maleficence, and respect for autonomy. It can be distinguished by its emphasis on relationships, human dignity and collaborative care.

== Development of subject ==
The nature of nursing means that nursing ethics tends to examine the ethics of caring rather than 'curing' by exploring the everyday interaction between the nurse and the person in care. Early work to define ethics in nursing focused more on the virtues that would make a good nurse, which historically included loyalty to the physician, rather than the focus being on nurse's conduct in relation to the person in the nurse's care. In recent times, the ethics of nursing has also shifted more towards the nurse's obligation to respect the human rights and dignity of the patient and this is reflected in a number of professional codes for nurses, such as in the latest code from the International Council of Nurses.

== Distinctive nature ==
Although much of nursing ethics can appear similar to medical ethics, there are some factors that differentiate it. Breier-Mackie suggests that nurses' focus on care and nurture, rather than cure of illness, results in a distinctive ethics. Furthermore, nursing ethics emphasizes the ethics of everyday practice rather than moral dilemmas. Nursing ethics is more concerned with developing the caring relationship than broader principles, such as beneficence and justice. For example, a concern to promote beneficence may be expressed in traditional medical ethics by the exercise of paternalism, where the health professional makes a decision based upon a perspective of acting in the patient's best interests. However, it is argued by some that this approach acts against person-centred values found in nursing ethics.

The distinction can be examined from different theoretical angles. Despite the move toward more deontological themes by some, there continues to be an interest in virtue ethics in nursing ethics and some support for an ethic of care. This is considered by its advocates to emphasise relationships over abstract principles and therefore to reflect the caring relationship in nursing more accurately than other ethical views. Themes that emphasize the dignity of the patient by promoting a respectful and caring attitude from nurses are also commonly seen.

== Some themes in nursing ethics ==
Nurses seek to defend the dignity of those in their care. Being able to respond to the vulnerability of patients in a way that provides dignifying care is a key concept in the field.

In terms of standard ethical theory, respecting dignity can also be aligned with having a respect for people and their autonomous choices. People are then enabled to make decisions about their own treatment. Amongst other things, the grounds of the practice of informed consent that should be respected by the nurse, although much of the debate lies in the discussion of cases where people are unable to make choices about their own treatment due to being incapacitated or having a mental illness that affects their judgement. A suggested way to maintain autonomy is for the person to write an advance directive, outlining how they wish to be treated in the event of their inability to make an informed choice, thus avoiding unwarranted paternalism.

Another theme is confidentiality and this is an important principle in many nursing ethical codes. This is where information about the person is only shared with others after permission of the person, unless it is felt that the information must be shared to comply with a higher duty such as preserving life. Related to information giving is the debate relating to truth telling in interactions with the person in care. There is a balance between people having the information required to make an autonomous decision and, on the other hand, not being unnecessarily distressed by the truth. Generally, the balance is in favour of truth telling due to respect for autonomy, but sometimes people will ask not to be told, or may lack the capacity to understand the implications. Finally, the role of empirical ethics has become prominent in recent years. Even more recently, the increased use of digital technologies - such as electronic health records, Telehealth, and AI-based clinical decision tools - has also introduced new ethical challenges that deal with data privacy and patient autonomy.

By giving consideration to the themes above, the nurse can endeavour to practice in an ethical way. This key outcome in nursing practice is sometimes challenged by resource, policy or environmental constraints in the practice area, which can lead to moral distress. Such moral distress that remains unresolved or occurs repeatedly, can build into a psychological load and may contribute to higher turnover rate among nurses. Moral distress may increase during large crises, such as pandemics, when rapidly changing clinical demands, staffing shortages, and limited resources further limit a nurses ability to provide ethnically consistent care.

== Awards for nursing ethics excellence ==
- The National Nursing Ethics Conference (NNEC) awards an annual Nursing Ethics Leadership Award
- Massachusetts Nursing Association (MNA) offers an Image of the Professional Nurse Award
- American Nursing Association Massachusetts offers an annual Living Legends in Massachusetts Nursing Award

== See also ==
- Bullying in nursing
- Clinical governance
- Patient advocacy
- Philosophy of healthcare
