= Code Gray: Ethical Dilemmas in Nursing =

1984 film

- Directed by: Joan Sawyer
- Produced by: Ben Achtenberg; Joan Sawyer
- Cinematography: Ben Achtenberg
- Edited by: Frank Galvin
- Production company: Fanlight Productions
- Distributed by: Fanlight Productions
- Release date: 1984
- Running time: 26 minutes
- Country: United States
- Language: English

Code Gray: Ethical Dilemmas in Nursing is a 1984 American short documentary film directed by Joan Sawyer. It was nominated for an Academy Award for Best Documentary Short.

This documentary shows four actual situations where nurses confront difficult ethical decisions, as they balance the often contradictory views of patients, family members, and other staff about what is best for their patients.

Case 1: A newborn with probably fatal birth defects that is a ward of the state is in the Neonatal ICU and nurses must decide what level of care represents beneficence, or "doing good."

Case 2: The staff in a nursing home must decide between respecting a patient's autonomy and the need to restrain her to prevent injury.

Case 3: The nurses in an ICU make daily decisions about allocation of nursing resources and bed according to the principles of justice.

Case 4: A nurse caring for a terminally ill patient faces a conflict between fidelity to her commitment to relieve suffering and the promise made to the patient's family.
