= Special Allocation Scheme =

The Special Allocation Scheme (SAS) is a process within the National Health Service in England, that allows general practitioners to deny their patients access to their general practice and others general practice if they think a patient's behaviour is aggressive or violent, limiting a patient's access to primary care to centres that have mitigations for risk of violence.

The scheme was previous referred to as the Violent Patient Scheme (VPS). There were 1686 referrals of patients to the scheme in 2018 in England.

== Legislation ==
The legal rights of a GP to remove a patient in response to violence or behaviour causing fear of violence that is reported to the police was created by secondary legislation applying to the National Health Service Act 1977.

The provision of services for patients barred from non-emergency medicine, was created by secondary legislation applying to the National Health Service Act 1977, by The National Health Service (Improved Access, Quality Information Preparation and Violent Patients Schemes) (England) Regulations 2003 to provide general medical services to patients immediately removed from a GP practice due to "act or threat of violence".

== Behaviours where the SAS does not apply ==
Primary care guidance states referral to the scheme should not be used lightly and should not be used for minor incidents or for behavior that could be ascribed to health conditions which could be alleviated through care management and treatment. The scheme does not normally cover swearing, invasion of personal space, shouting, banging on a desk or a previously non-aggressive patient who is clearly suffering mental or physical anguish. It also does not cover incidents in a hospital or community setting.

== Appeal and review ==
Primary care guidance state that there should be an appeal process and this appeal should occur within 28 days and if appropriate allow for a patient to be represented, but that removal occurs prior to an appeal.

In South West England, patients are entitled to appeal, but must appeal within a month of being referred to the special allocation scheme. A panel will then be held within 28 days involving healthcare staff. A review of patients is made each year, and if the panel deems the patient to not present a risk to health staff they are removed from the scheme.
