= Medical Errors and Medical Narcissism =

2005 book by John Banja

Medical Errors and Medical Narcissism is a 2005 book by John Banja.

Banja defines "medical narcissism" as the need of health professionals to preserve their self-esteem leading to the compromise of error disclosure to patients.

In the book he explores the psychological, ethical and legal effects of medical errors and the extent to which a need to constantly assert their competence can cause otherwise capable, and even exceptional, professionals to fall into narcissistic traps.

He claims that:

...most health professionals (in fact, most professionals of any ilk) work on cultivating a self that exudes authority, control, knowledge, competence and respectability. It's the narcissist in us all—we dread appearing stupid or incompetent.
