= Bullying in medicine =

Bullying in the medical profession is common, particularly of student or trainee physicians. It is thought that this is at least in part an outcome of conservative traditional hierarchical structures and teaching methods in the medical profession which may result in a bullying cycle.

People with Type A personality are attracted to highly educated professions such as medicine and law, both by the pride of overachievement and by the opportunities to exercise authority over others. Personal egotism, reinforced by successes in career development and increased social status, can lead to power harassment towards vulnerable clients, colleagues and students.

While the stereotype of a victim as a weak person who somehow deserves to be bullied is salient, there is growing evidence that bullies, who are often driven by jealousy and envy, pick on the highest performing students, whose mere presence is sufficient to make the bully feel insecure. The victims are usually academic high achievers and are likely to have been top of the class throughout their school years. As medical students have to compete against each other, this can make certain trainee doctors eager to stand out from the crowd, and some use underhanded techniques to gain more recognition.

The rampant problem of medical student mistreatment and bullying was systematically studied and reported in a 1990 JAMA study by pediatrician Henry K. Silver which found that 46.4 percent of students at one medical school had been abused at some point during medical school; by the time they were seniors, that number was 80.6 percent.

In a 2002 test, 594 BMA members were randomly selected to complete a bullying survey, and 220 of the 594 junior doctors reported having been bullied in the previous year. This survey reported no variance in job grade or age.

== Psychology ==
Threats (of exposure of inadequacy) must be ruthlessly controlled and subjugated. Psychological models such as transference and projection have been proposed to explain such behaviors, wherein the bully's sense of personal inadequacy is projected or transferred to a victim; through making others feel inadequate and subordinate, the bully thus vindicates their own sense of inferiority.

Displacement is another defense mechanism that can explain the propensity of many medical educators to bully students, and may operate subconsciously. Displacement entails the redirection of an impulse (usually aggression) onto a powerless substitute target. The target can be a person or an object that can serve as a symbolic substitute. Displacement can operate in chain-reactions, wherein people unwittingly become at once victims and perpetrators of displacement. For example, a resident physician may be undergoing stress with her patients or at home, but cannot express these feelings toward patients or toward her family members, so she channels these negative emotions toward vulnerable students in the form of intimidation, control or subjugation. The student then acts brashly toward a patient, channeling reactive emotions which cannot be directed back to the resident physician onto more vulnerable subjects.

A review found that there were 5 main drivers of bullying and unprofessional behaviours in healthcare: 1. disempowered staff who feel undervalued; 2. harmful workplace processes and cultures (high job demands because of understaffing, for instance); 3. a lack of team cohesion and support, which can be caused by shift working; 4. reduced ability to speak up; 5. managers who lack awareness or recognition of unprofessional behaviours, and take no action.

Beyond its ramifications for victims, disrespect and bullying in medicine is a threat to patient safety because it inhibits collegiality and cooperation essential to teamwork, cuts off communication, undermines morale, and inhibits compliance with and implementation of new practices.

=== Bullying cycle ===
Medical training usually takes place in institutions that have a highly structured hierarchical system, and has traditionally involved teaching by intimidation and humiliation. Such practices may foster a culture of bullying and the setting up of a cycle of bullying, analogous to other cycles of abuse in which those who experience it go on to abuse others when they become more senior. Medical doctors are increasingly reporting to the British Medical Association that they are being bullied, often by older and more senior colleagues, many of whom were badly treated themselves when more junior.

Physician Jonathan Belsey relates in an emblematic narrative published in AMA Virtual Mentor entitled Teaching By Humiliation that "however well you presented the case, somewhere along the line you would trip up and give the predatory professor his opportunity to expose your inadequacies. Sometimes it would be your lack of medical knowledge; sometimes the question that you failed to ask the patient that would have revealed the root of the problem, or sometimes your ineptitude at eliciting the required clinical signs. On one memorable occasion, when I had appeared to cover all the bases clinically, the professor turned to me and berated me for attending his ward round wearing a plaid shirt that was clearly inappropriate for an aspiring doctor."

== Impact ==
Bullying can significantly decrease job satisfaction and increase job-induced stress; it also leads to low self-confidence, depression, anxiety and a desire to leave employment. Bullying contributes to high rates of staff turnover, high rates of sickness absence, impaired performance, lower productivity, poor team spirit and loss of trained staff. This has implications for the recruitment and retention of medical staff.

Chronic and current bullying are associated with substantially worse health, according to research by Laura M. Bogart, associate professor of pediatrics at Harvard Medical School.

Studies have consistently shown that physicians have had the highest depression and suicide rates compared to people in many other lines of work—for suicide, 40% higher for male physicians and 130% higher for female physicians. Research has traced the beginning of this difference to the years spent in medical school. Students enter medical school with mental health profiles similar to those of their peers but end up experiencing depression, burnout, suicidal ideation and other mental illnesses at much higher rates. Despite better access to health care, they are more likely to cope by resorting to dysfunctional and self-injurious behaviors, and are less likely to receive the right care or even recognize that they need some kind of intervention.

Exposure to bullying and intimidation during formative years of medical training has been found to contribute to these consequences. Fear of stigmatisation among medical students was the subject of a study in JAMA by Thomas Schwenk and colleagues at the University of Michigan's Department of Family Medicine, USA. 53% of medical students who reported high levels of depressive symptoms were worried that revealing their illness would be risky for their careers and 62% said asking for help would mean their coping skills were inadequate, according to the study published in September 2010. "Medical students are under extraordinary demands. They feel they are making life and death decisions and that they can never be wrong. There is such tremendous pressure to be perfect that any sense of falling short makes them very anxious", says Schwenk.

== Types ==
=== Medical students ===
Medical students, perhaps being vulnerable because of their relatively low status in health care settings, may experience verbal abuse, humiliation and harassment (nonsexual or sexual). Discrimination based on gender and race are less common.

In one study, around 35% of medical students reported having been bullied. Around one in four of the 1,000 students questioned said they had been bullied by a medical doctor. Furthermore, bullying has been known to occur among medical students. Manifestations of bullying include:

- being humiliated by teachers in front of patients or peers
- been victimised for not having come from a "medical family" (often people who enter medicine have an older sibling pursuing the same degree or share ties with other individuals in the profession with whom familial relationship confers some degree of protection or special influence – especially within academic settings.) Such practices extend to admissions procedures, which are regularly influenced by factors far afield of candidates' intrinsic merits, such as being related to faculty members or well-known medical luminaries.
- being put under pressure to carry out a procedure without supervision.
- being ostracized by other medical students for asking questions (due to the medical content being confusing for some students) through social media networks (Facebook bullying), phone, or in person.

Ragging is an additional form of abuse faced by medical students in many countries, often resulting in physical or psychological harm. One study showed that the medical faculty was the faculty in which students were most commonly mistreated. Bullying extends to postgraduate students.

Medical students are increasingly involved in scientific research, but as early career researchers, they are particularly vulnerable to exploitation and mistreatment. Toxic research cultures are highly detrimental, manifesting in unethical practices and abuse of power by more senior researchers. These environments foster undue credit claims, coercive behavior, and a competitive atmosphere that prioritizes personal gain over collaborative and ethical conduct. Such cultures, driven by pressures to publish and secure funding, undermine the well-being and professional development of junior researchers, perpetuating a cycle of mistreatment and ethical compromise.

=== Junior (trainee) physicians ===
In a UK study, 37% of junior doctors reported being bullied in the previous year and 84% had experienced at least one bullying incident. Black and Asian physicians were more likely to be bullied than other physicians. Women were more likely to be bullied than men.

Trainee physicians who feel threatened in the clinical workplace usually develop more cautiously, slowly and are less likely to ask for advice or help when they need it. Persistent destructive criticism, sarcastic comments and humiliation in front of colleagues will cause most trainees to lose confidence and deny help where it is needed.

Consultants who feel burnt out and alienated may take their disaffection out on junior colleagues.

The farewell interview from Sir Ian Kennedy (Chair of the Healthcare Commission) caused significant media interest following his statement that bullying is a 'corrosive' problem that the NHS must address.

=== Psychiatry ===
Psychiatric trainees experience rates of bullying at least as high as other medical students. In a survey of psychiatric trainees in the West Midlands, 47% had experienced bullying within the last year with even higher percentages amongst ethnic minorities and females. Qualified psychiatrists are not themselves required to be psychiatrically assessed.

=== Nursing ===
Nurses experience bullying quite frequently. It is thought that relational aggression (psychological aspects of bullying such as gossiping and intimidation) are commonplace. Relational aggression has been studied among girls but not so much among adult women.

Speaking of many doctors' predilection for bullying nurses, Theresa Brown writes:

...the most damaging bullying is not flagrant and does not fit the stereotype of a surgeon having a tantrum in the operating room. It is passive, like not answering pages or phone calls, and tends toward the subtle: condescension rather than outright abuse, and aggressive or sarcastic remarks rather than straightforward insults.

== Popular culture ==
Sir Lancelot Spratt, a character played by actor James Robertson Justice in the film series Doctor in the House, is often referenced as the archetypal arrogant bullying doctor ruling by fear. The film series also demonstrates bullying of student doctors by other doctors and the nursing matron.

In the American sitcom Scrubs, Dr. Cox uses intimidation and sarcasm as methods of tormenting the interns and expressing his dislike towards them and their company.

== See also ==
- Aggression in healthcare
- Disruptive physician
- Doctor-patient relationship
- Burnout and depression of medical students
- Medical education
- Medical narcissism
- Medical school
- Sham peer review
- Stafford Hospital scandal
- Stress in medical students
- Whistleblowing
- Workplace safety in healthcare settings
