= Patient-initiated violence =

Occupational hazard

Patient-initiated violence is a specific form of workplace violence that affects healthcare workers that is the result of verbal, physical, or emotional abuse from a patient or family members of whom they have assumed care. Nurses represent the highest percentage of affected workers; however, other roles include physicians, therapists, technicians, home care workers, and social workers. Non clinical workers are also assaulted, for example, security guards, cleaners, clerks, technicians. The Occupational Safety and Health Administration used 2013 Bureau of Labor Statistics and reported that healthcare workplace violence requiring days absent from work from patients represented 80% of cases. In 2014, a survey by the American Nurses Association of 3,765 nurses and nursing students found that 21% reported physical abuse, and over 50% reported verbal abuse within a 12-month period. Causes for patient outbursts vary, including psychiatric diagnosis, under the influence of drugs or alcohol, or subject to a long wait time. Certain areas are more at risk for this kind of violence including healthcare workers in psychiatric settings, emergency or critical care, or long-term care and dementia units.

== Areas of high prevalence ==
=== Emergency departments ===
The American College of Emergency Physicians found that greater than 75% of emergency physicians were the victim of one or more violent incidents in the workplace, noting that the majority was by patients or their families. Causes for the increased presence of violence, especially in urban settings, are related to gang activity, lengthened waiting periods to see a doctor, a failure of community medical resources, and unavailable acute psychiatric treatment. In 2011 the Emergency Nurses Association studies, among emergency room nurses, 54.4% reported experiencing physical violence and 42.5% reported experiencing verbal violence. Within this study, 55.7% perpetrators of physical violence were under the influence of alcohol. 46.8% were under the influence of illegal or prescription drugs, and 45.2% were being treated for psychiatric reasons. A majority of the violent behavior that occurred was during the triage process at 40.2%. A 2026 study based on a 2024 survey of American Association for the Surgery of Trauma members found that 63.9% of respondents knew of a deliberate assault on a healthcare worker within their trauma center or health system, 42.5% reported having been assaulted themselves, and 7.5% reported being injured, although the survey response rate was 10.9%.

=== Intensive care and outpatient clinics ===
In Turkey, 233 nurses were surveyed, about 80% of these nurses reported they were verbally abused in the past year. The highest rates during this survey were intensive care units and outpatient clinics. The study reports there was no formal mechanism for reporting abuse. Following the fatal shootings of orthopedic surgeons Dr. Preston Phillips in Tulsa in 2022 and Dr. Benjamin Mauck in Tennessee in 2023, a survey of American Academy of Orthopaedic Surgeons members found that 77.1% of 1,125 respondents had experienced workplace violence, most commonly verbal abuse by patients, with higher rates among trauma and tumor surgeons, women, and surgeons in their first 15 years of practice.

=== Psychiatric and dementia units ===
Workers in departments that specialize in mental health are particularly at risk for patient abuse due to the psychiatric disease states, high rates of substance abuse, and previous violent patient behavior. A study of Canadian psychiatric nurses noted that social stigma of psychiatric disorders plays a significant role in how nurses perceive violence. Caregivers were uncomfortable with the notion that patient violence is part of the job but also that it is unfair to believe that those with mental illness should be seen as more violent in nature. OSHA reported that violent injuries in psychiatric aides was 10 times higher than any other healthcare worker at 590 injuries per 10,000 full-time employees.

== Factors ==
Emergency departments have been identified as a key factor by patients crowding the ER, which contributes to patients being violent towards nurses. High levels of stress, nurses are being burnt out, and the turnover rate is increasing which creates a hostile work/environment.

== Underreporting ==
Underreporting of patient-initiated violence is common with professionals claiming that assault is a part of the job. A report from the National Center for the Analysis of Violent Crime dedicates underreporting is likely due to a fear of retaliation, or belief that it will not lead to any change. There is also a commonly held belief that violence is a part of the job. The Massachusetts Nurses Association followed up on this common belief through a survey of three New England hospitals, finding that only 39% of participants reported all incidents of violence. The same report found that 70% of those who reported an incident found that management was supportive, however a majority noted that nothing was done to solve the problem. A study of Canadian psychiatric nurses reported that not only was violence a part of the job, but its occurrence no longer warranted reporting. The same report noted that underreporting drastically affects the ability of the Occupational Safety and Health Administration to track these occurrences. Many qualitative studies done on nurses suggest that there is frequent discouragement by hospital officials and legal officers to not press charges against abusive patients or their families related to an understanding that violence is a part of the job.

== Lasting effects of violence ==
The effects of patient-initiated violence has been found correlate to lasting symptoms of post traumatic stress disorder, acute stress disorder, and high rates of burnout. Nurses who experience a lack of support from public officials after the event reported feelings of anxiety and frustration. OSHA sampled one hospital who paid for medical treatment of 30 staff members subject to patient-initiated violence over a one-year period costing $94,146. It was also estimated that the costs of separation, recruitment, hiring, and training of new staff to be anywhere from 25,000 to 103,000.

A study in Orebro Reginal Hospital in Sweden suggested a link between patient-initiated violence, burnout, and decreased care outcomes. It was reported that the highest indicator of care quality outcomes is a positive or negative association with an individual's work environment.

== Prevention ==
Solutions to this issues range dependent on facility and location. A common suggestions from nursing staff is for additional trainings specifically on the de-escalation of high risk situations and health professional legal rights 55% of participants of workers in New England Hospitals stated they were aware of their legal rights relating to workplace violence. The national institute of occupational safety and health (NOSHA) created a free online training module that went live in 2013. The Veterans Health Administration has reduced occurrences of assaults by flagging high risk based on previous documentation of attacks on caregivers. The American Nurses Association has modeled a state bill for a "Violence Prevention in Health Care Facilities Act" that would call for the creation of violence prevention committees, annual violence prevention training, and sufficient record keeping of violence acts.

== See also ==
- Violence against healthcare professionals by country
- Workplace violence
- Workplace safety in healthcare settings
- Compassion fatigue
- Occupational burnout
