= Workplace safety in healthcare settings =

Workplace safety in healthcare settings is similar to the workplace safety concerns in most occupations, but there are some unique risk factors, such as chemical exposures, and the distribution of injuries is somewhat different from the average of all occupations. Injuries to workers in healthcare settings usually involve overexertion or falling, such as strained muscles from lifting a patient or slipping on a wet floor. There is a higher than average risk of violence from other people, and a lower than average risk of transportation-related injuries.

== Aggression in the healthcare ==
Aggression was, in 1968, described by Moyer as "a behaviour that causes or leads to harm, damage or destruction of another organism". Human aggression has more recently been defined as "any behaviour directed toward another individual that is carried out with the proximate intent to cause harm".

The definition can be extended to include the fact that aggression can be physical, verbal, active or passive and be directly or indirectly focused at the victim–with or without the use of a weapon, and possibly incorporating psychological or emotional tactics. It requires the perpetrator to have intent, and the victim to attempt evasion of the actions. Hence harm that is accidental cannot be considered aggressive as it does not incorporate intent, nor can harm implicated with intent to help (for example the pain experienced by a patient during dental treatment) be classed as aggression as there is no motivation to evade the action. A description of workplace violence by Wynne, Clarkin, Cox, & Griffiths (1997), define workplace violence to be incidents resulting in abuse, assault or threats directed towards staff with regard to work–including an explicit or implicit challenge to their safety, well-being or health.

The rate of aggression within the health care varies by country, globally 24% of healthcare workers experience physical violence each year and 42% experience verbal or sexual abuse. This rate has been decreasing in North America and increasing in Australasia. In Europe, rates of verbal abuse have decreased and physical violence have remained stable over the past decade.

Aggression and violence negatively impact both the workplace and its employees. For the organisation, greater financial costs can be incurred due increased absences, early retirement and reduced quality of care. For the healthcare worker however, psychological damage such as post-traumatic stress can result, in addition to a decrease in job motivation. Aggression also harms patient care. Rude remarks from patients or their family members can distract healthcare professionals and cause them to make mistakes during a medical procedure.

A survey from the British National Audit Office (2003) stated that aggression and violence accounted for 40% of reported health and safety incidents amongst healthcare workers. Another survey looking into the abuse and violence experienced in 3078 general dental practices over a period of three years found that 80% of practice personnel had experienced self-reported verbal abuse, abuse or violence. It was reported that, over 12 months in Australian hospitals, 95% of staff had experienced verbal aggression. In the UK over 50% of nurses had experienced aggression or violence over a 12-month period. In the United States, the annual rate of nonfatal, job-related violent crime against mental healthcare workers was 68.2 per 1,000 workers compared to 12.6 per 1,000 workers in all other occupations.

In the United States, the emergency department is one of the most high-risk places to work in a hospital, which makes sense because most individuals in the emergency room are people who have just been injured and need to be rushed to the hospital. That situation is very stressful and scary for most people, so it may lead to emotions that are not truly meant, including aggressive emotions. Nurses' reports of patient aggression is not always taken seriously, which can make nurses less likely to report, ultimately leading to mental health issues.

It was stated that nonfatal injuries because of aggression were three times more frequent against health care professionals than private industry workers.

== Causes ==
Many factors are correlated with an increased risk of violence. Regarding workplace design, poor delineation of staff only areas, overcrowding, poor access to amenities and unsecured furnishing increase the risks of violence. Regarding work practices, waiting times, poor customer service, working alone, lack of training, low level of staff empowerment, lack of deescalation training, lack of straff training in the cause of violence, the use of physical restraint and the presence of cash on-site is correlated with violence. Physicians who are unprepared, lacking in education about violence including deescalation, lacking in medical skills of social skills, less experienced, overworked are more likely to be involved in violence. The physicians interpersonal style, personality and emotional state are correlated with violence.

Patients who experience poverty or social exclusion, or lack the language of cultural competence to interact with physicians are more likely to be involved in violence. As well as those with certain injuries or disorders, such as head injuries, some psychiatric disorders, or thyroid disorders. Stressors, lack of respect and perceived respect, experience of poor healthcare historically, and intoxication are also risks for violence.

Regarding the interactions that preceded aggression, misunderstandings or disputes about medical issues, patients being or feeling dismissed, dissatisfaction with care, physical contact, frustration with the patients intention, and involuntary treatment are correlated with violence.

== Ways of classifying aggression and violence ==
Most studies on violence in nursing are empirical in nature with little theoretical analysis. A systematic review on theoretical framings suggested an indisciplinary approach to capture the nuances of violence in a healthcare setting.

Classification
Patient-on-professional aggression can be classified as Type II; where the perpetrator commits a violent act whilst being served by the organisation, with which they have a legitimate relationship. It is uncommon for such attacks to result in death, however they are evidently responsible for approximately 60% of non-fatal assaults at work. Within this classification that is based on the relationship between the perpetrator and victim, Type I aggression involves the perpetrator entering the workplace to commit a crime–having no relationship to the organisation or its employees. Type III deals with a current/former employee targeting a co-worker or supervisor for what they perceive to be wrong-doing. Type IV aggression involves the perpetrator having an ongoing/previous relationship with an employee within the organisation.
Internal Model
The internal model associates aggression with factors within the person, including mental illness or personality. This model is supported by the multiple studies correlating a link between aggression and illness. A person's traits can relate to their expression of aggression–narcissists for example, tend to become angry and aggressive if their image is threatened. Sex tends to affect aggression–with certain provocations affecting each sex differently. It was found that males tend to prefer direct aggression, and females indirect. A study by Hobbs and Keane, 1996 says that patient factors commonly related to or causative of patient violence include; male sex, relative youth or the effects of alcohol or drug consumption. A study conducted amongst General Medical Practitioners in the West Midlands found that men were involved in 66% of aggression cases; rising to 76% with regard to assault/injury–the main male perpetrator being aged under 40 years of age. Patient anxiety, a particular problem associated with dentistry, tended to be the most likely instigator for verbal abuse and the second most likely reason for threatening verbal abuse.
External Model
This model is based on the idea that social and physical environmental influences affect aggression. This includes the provisions for privacy, space and location. Motivation for aversion, possibly due to pain during dental treatment, can increase aggression–as can general discomfort, such as that resulting from sitting in a hot waiting room or in an uncomfortable position (for example in a reclined dental chair). Alcohol intoxication or excessive caffeine intake tends to indirectly exacerbate aggression. The Hobbs & Keane (1996) study states the involvement of drugs and alcohol; in 65% of cases at one Accident & Emergency Department and in 27% of all general practice cases. The study denotes intoxication to be the main reason for assaults and injury (along with mental illness). Frustration, defined by Anderson and Bushman as "the blockage of goal attainment", can also contribute to aggression–whether the frustrations are fully justified or not. Such frustration-related aggression tended to be against the perpetrator and persons not involved in failure to reach the goal. Prolonged waiting times in A&E departments and general practice led to aggression due to frustration; it generally being directed towards receptionists–with approximately 73% of doctors becoming involved.
Situational/Interactional Model
This deals with factors involved in the immediate situation, for example interactions between patients and staff. There are multiple studies that support the correlation between staff with a negative attitude and patient aggression. Provocation has been said to be the most important cause of human aggression –examples include verbal and physical aggression against the individual. It was found that perceived injustice, in the context of equality amongst staff for example, positively correlated to workplace aggression.
Expressions of Hostility
This is related to "behaviours that are primarily verbal or symbolic in nature". In terms of Staff-on-Staff hostility, this can involve he perpetrator talking behind the targets back. With Patient-on-Professional hostility however, this can deal with the patient assuming false knowledge over the professional–with the patient belittling their opinions.
Obstructionism
This involves the perpetrator conducting actions that aim to "obstruct or impede the target's performance". Failures to pass on information or respond to phone calls for example, are ways in which Staff-on-Staff obstructionism can be demonstrated. Patient-on-Professional obstructionism can be demonstrated by a failure on behalf of the patient to comply with the professional conducting a certain task. An unwillingness to allow the professional to diagnose the patient and a failure to turn up to appointments are examples of such obstructionism.
Overt Aggression
This normally relates to workplace aggression, and involves behaviours including; threatening abuse, physical assault and vandalism. This again can occur with regard to both, Staff-on-Staff and Patient-on-Professional aggression.
Buss' Three-Dimensional Model of Aggression
Buss differentiated aggression into a three-dimensional model; physical-verbal, active-passive and direct-indirect–active-passive being removed in 1995 when Buss refined the categories. Physical assault would come under the category physical-direct-active, whereas obstructionism relates to physical-passive–be it direct or indirect. Verbal abuse or insults relate to verbal-active-direct aggression, whereas the failure to answer a question when asked, for example with regard to lifestyle choices or habits, can come under the verbal-passive-direct category–providing the reasons for not answering are directed at the healthcare worker (e.g. hostility), as opposed to fear for example.
Struggle for recognition theory
A theory of violence based on struggle for recognition has been applied in healthcare settings. In this theory, nonrecognition and misrecognition of facts about the patient are causes of interpersonal conflict and violence. In a study of the interpersonal factors preceding violent incidents, healthcare workers identified unmet needs, involuntary assessment and unsolicited touch as correlated.

== Mental Health issues due to abuse ==
Nurses dealing with more mental health issues is something that has come from dealing with workplace violence. In a study, it was found that somewhere between sixty and ninety percent of nurses are exposed to physical or verbal violence at some point in their work. This shows how real it is within a nurse's daily work life. The violence can severely take a toll on someone's mental health. The article states, "A systematic review of 68 studies found workplace violence was most strongly associated with negative psychological outcomes, including post-traumatic stress disorder, depression, anxiety, sleep disturbances and fatigue". With this being stated, it gives the readers a good idea of why workplace violence is so dangerous for healthcare workers.

== Interventions ==
When dealing with aggression and violence in the workplace, training and education are the primary strategy for resolution. There are a number or personal factors that can help reduce aggression within the healthcare setting, which include improved interpersonal skills, with an awareness of patient aggression and knowledge regarding dealing with emotional patients. Although assertiveness is crucial when it comes to the interpersonal skills possessed by healthcare workers, it has been shown by multiple studies that nurses tend not to be very assertive. Training is therefore usually offered by organizations with regard to assertiveness, and deals mainly with improving self-esteem, self-confidence and interpersonal communication.

The Health Services Advisory Committee (HSAC) recommends a three-dimensional foundation by which to deal with violence in the workplace. It involves "researching the problem and assessing the risk, reducing the risk and checking what has been done".

In 1997, HSAC provided the following guidelines as to what good training involves:

- Theory: To understand the aggression within the workplace
- Prevention: To assess the danger and take precautions
- Interaction: With aggressive individuals
- Post-Incident Action: To report, investigate, counsel, and follow up the incident

=== Identifying whether patients are currently at risk of violence ===
The STAMP violence assessment framework lists elements of patient behaviour that are correlated with violence, and was developed in 2005 by Luck, Jackson and Usher. This model was later extended by the authors into an 18-point violence assessment tool. Looking at the predictors in the violence assessment tool, resisting nonconsensual healthcare was found to be the best predictory of violence, followed by aggressive language and yelling.

=== Assertiveness training ===
Although multiple studies looking at the effectiveness of training have provided inconclusive results, a study by Lin et al. positively correlated the improvement of assertiveness and self-esteem with an assertiveness training programme. The programme targets difficult interactions that we may face in day-to-day life and includes both, behavioural and cognitive techniques. The effectiveness of training is measured using the Assertive Scale, Esteem Scale, and Interpersonal Communication Satisfaction Inventory.

=== Evaluating the effectiveness of training ===
It remains that training is not universally or consistently offered to healthcare workers. Beale et al. found that the levels of training offered ranged from nothing to high-level restraint/self-defense training. A report by the National Audit Office (NAO) in 2003 found that, within mental health trusts, a reactionary approach tends to prioritise over prevention. Although criticised by some; restraint, seclusion and medication are used (Wright 1999, Gudjonsson et al. 2004). Breakaway techniques, restraint, rapid tranquilisation or isolation tend to be recommended when violence is instigated with a failure to prevent aggression. This correlates to the level of training offered, which dominates in these areas, however lacks in situation risk assessment and customer care–methods that are vital in a preventative approach to prevent escalation of the situation, causing for reactionary measures to be brought into play.

The study by Beale et al. therefore provides the following advice as to good practice:

- Training should emphasise prevention, calming and negotiation skills as opposed to confrontation
- Training should be offered in modules, ranging initially from basic customer care and handling difficult patients to full control and restraint of patients.
- Material relating to the causes of aggression, how to reduce risks, anticipation of violence, resolving conflict and dealing with post-incident circumstances should be provided to staff.
- Physical breakaway skills should be taught–however an understanding as to situations in which such skills should be practiced must be appreciated.
- Staff should be taught to control their own feelings
- An understanding of normal/abnormal post-trauma reactions should be reached
- Staff should be familiar with local arrangements and policies

== See also ==
- Bullying in medicine
- Bullying in nursing
- Doctor-patient relationship
- Millfields Charter, an electronic charter which promotes an end to teaching any prone (face down) restraint holds to frontline healthcare staff
- Patient abuse
- Patient-initiated violence
