= Elmcrest Hospital =

- Private, Saint Francis Hospital

Geography
- Location: Marlborough Road, Portland, Connecticut, United States
- Coordinates: 41°34′18″N 72°38′22″W

Organization
- Type: Psychiatric

Services
- Beds: 24

History
- Founded: Circa 1942
- Closed: Circa 2006

Links
- Lists: Hospitals in Connecticut

Elmcrest Hospital, later St. Francis Care Behavioral Health, was a small psychiatric facility in Portland, Connecticut. Opened in 1942, the campus incorporated three historic mansions, including a childhood home of 1800s businesswoman Elizabeth Jarvis Colt.

The facility was purchased by Saint Francis Hospital in 1997, and in 1998, the hospital underwent increased scrutiny when an 11-year-old patient died while being restrained by an employee. In 2003, inpatient services at the campus were discontinued, and patients were relocated to the Saint Francis Mount Sinai campus. Hartford Hospital purchased the campus in 2003 and continued operating the outpatient and partial hospitalization services for children and teens at the site through its affiliate the Rushford Center. Rushford discontinued operations at the site c. 2006. A redevelopment plan that would have demolished two of the three historic homes was proposed in 2006, however the original effort had stalled by 2009.

On February 1, 2018, the Portland Planning and Zoning Commission voted unanimously to approve the Brainerd Place development for the site. As of 2022, the project is expected to include a mix of apartments and retail, while adaptively redeveloping the three historic homes in place.

== Historic assets ==
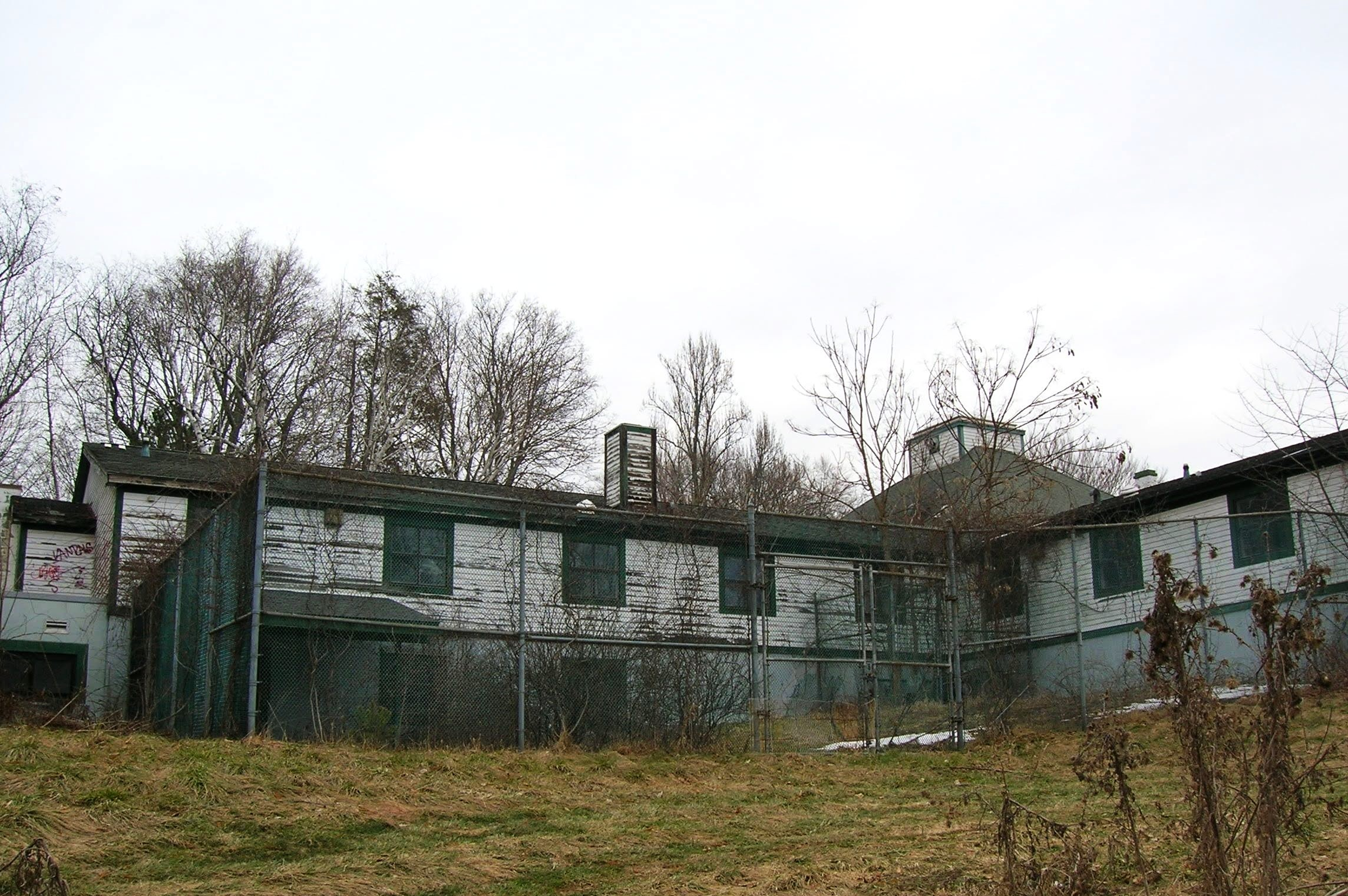
Abandoned building at former Elmcrest Hospital

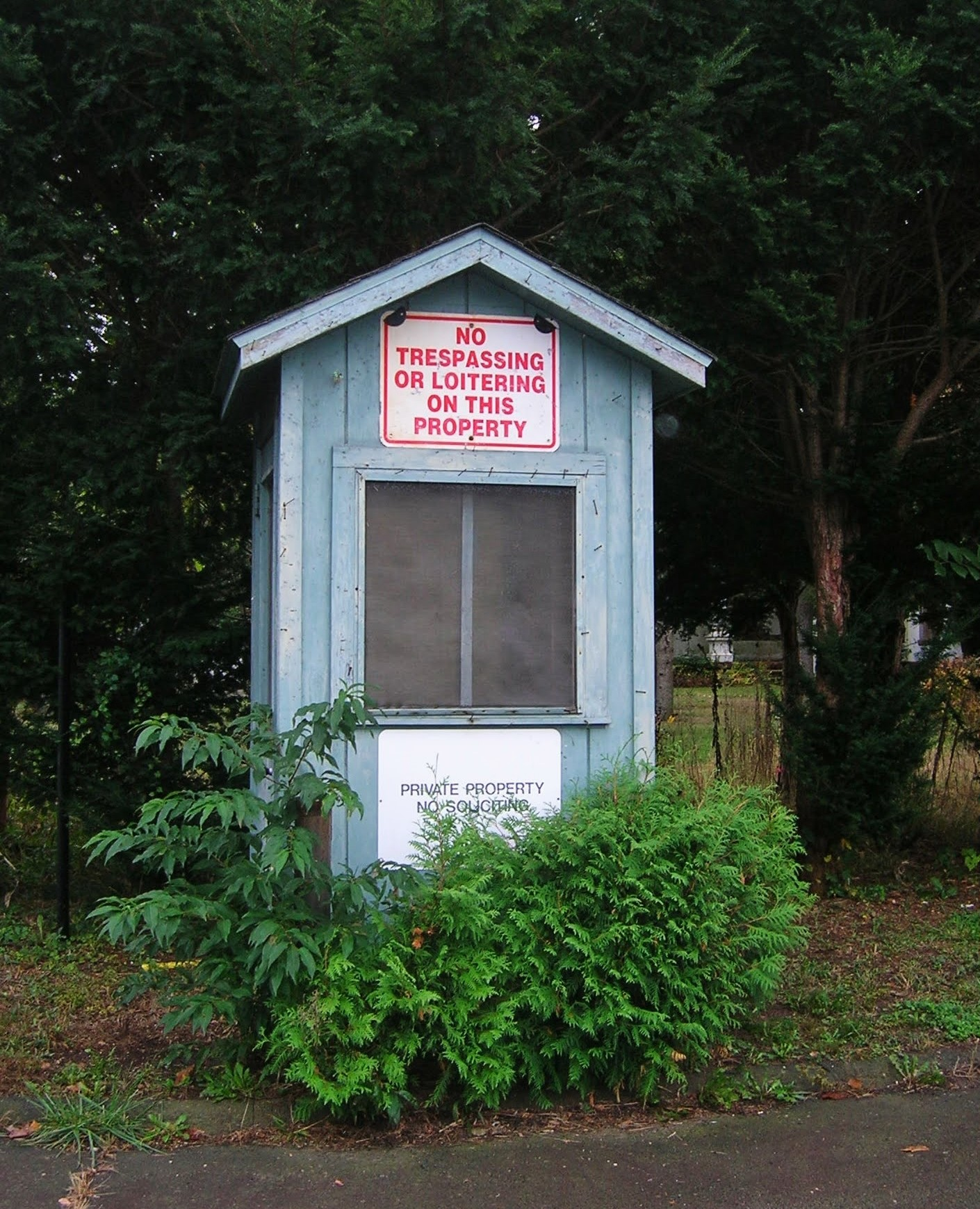
Abandoned guard shack at former Elmcrest Hospital

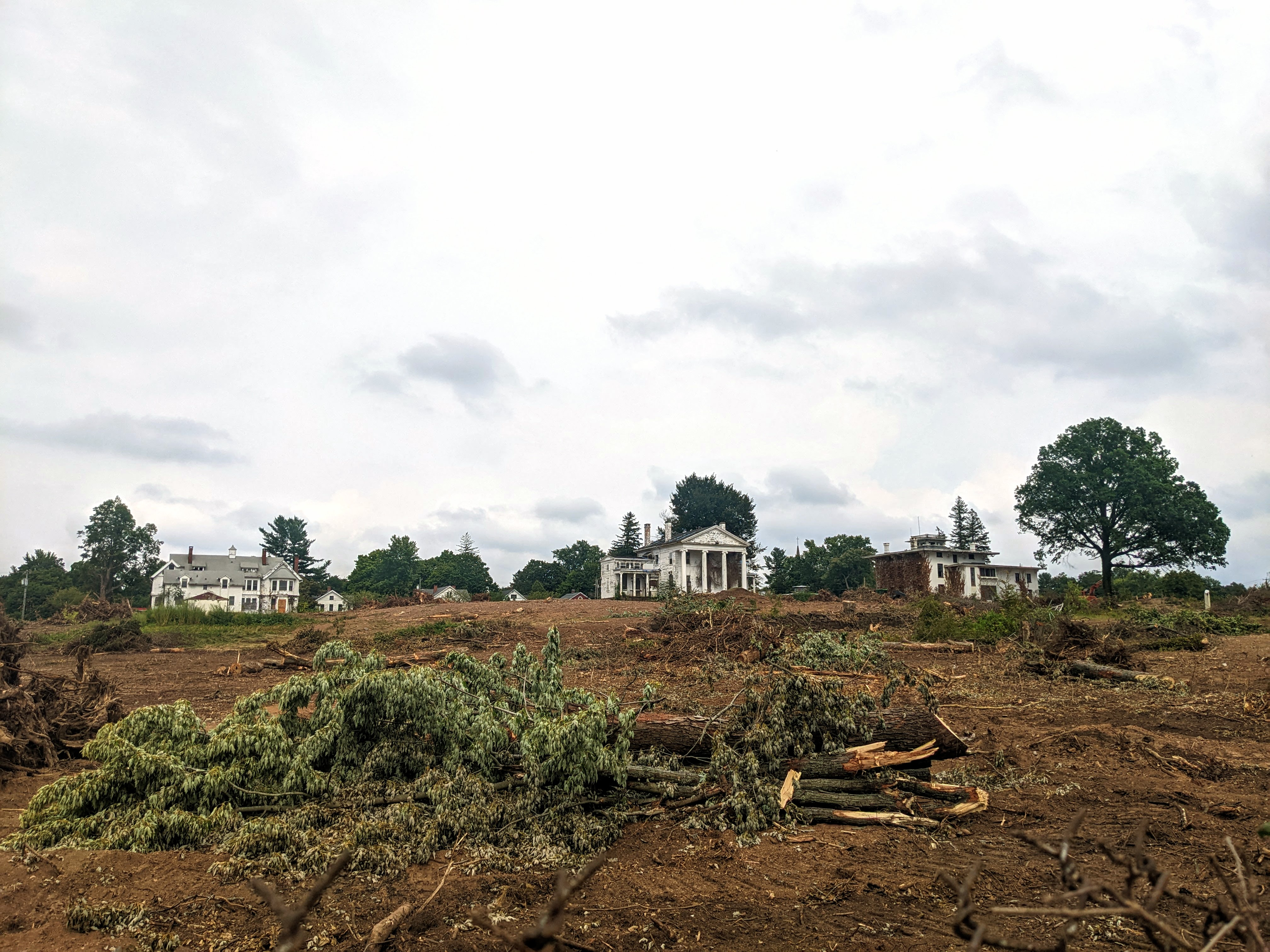
A photo of the three historic homes in September 2022, after hospital structures demolished. View of south facades facing Connecticut River.

The following structures are contributing structures of the Marlborough Street Historic District, listed on the National Register of Historic Places.

- Brainerd House and carriage house (1851) - carriage house demolished circa 2019
- Hart-Jarvis House (1829–30)
- Sage House (1884)

== Redevelopment efforts ==
In 2006, developers proposed building condos and a shopping center anchored by a supermarket. The plan drew criticism, as two of the three historic homes located on the campus would be demolished. The plan was active through at least 2009, however, the campus remained vacant, and no demolition occurred prior to approval of the current Brainerd Place development. The only historic asset to be demolished as of 2021 was the 1851 Carriage house, which was to the far left of the main hospital site entrance.

In August 2014, the town of Portland received a $50,000 grant from the Connecticut Trust for Historic Preservation, under its Vibrant Cities Initiative. In early 2015, the town used the grant to hire a consultant to help guide development with a hopeful goal of rehabilitating the historical structures as part of an economically viable redevelopment. Community groups such as the Elmcrest Campus Advisory Committee and the Portland Historical Society have also been working to encourage redevelopment that preserves the structures.

== Brainerd Place ==
In 2015, developer Daniel Bertram introduced a conceptual plan for the property, known as Brainerd Place, that would preserve two of the historic homes in place and relocate the Hart-Jarvis to the rear of the property facing the Arrigoni Bridge. The proposed site plan would include 238 residential apartments on the east side of the property in two multistory buildings, and up to 75,000 square feet of commercial space visible from CT Route 66 and Main Street. Bertram, a participant in the study sponsored by Vibrant Communities grant, applied for a text amendment to the Portland zoning regulations that would allow a higher number of residential units within mixed-use developments.

The proposed regulations, passed in July 2016, would allowed the increased number of units under the condition that the site plan would preserve significant historical assets, a priority of the Portland Plan of Conservation and Development. The regulations would also prohibit occupancy of the residential units until a substantial portion of the commercial structures were constructed. A property tax abatement plan was approved by the Portland Board of Selectmen in March 2017. On February 1, 2018, the five member Portland Planning and Zoning Commission voted unanimously to approve the project. Review of the building plans and application for a traffic permit from the state is expected to take between three and six months.

The initially approved site plan from 2018 mirrored the conceptual plan for renovating two of the existing historic homes in their current locations and relocating the Hart-Jarvis house to a site on the property overlooking the Connecticut River and Arrigoni Bridge. In September 2022, a modified site plan was approved that would keep the Hart-Jarvis house in its current location on Main Street, citing the potential $200,000 cost to relocate the building. The house would instead be renovated for office space.

On October 20, 2021, a fire broke out at the site, damaging two buildings. The buildings were already slated for demolition prior to the incident, while no historical buildings on site were damaged. As of 2022, all hospital buildings except the three historic homes were demolished.
