= University of Connecticut School of Medicine =

Public medical school in Farmington, Connecticut, US

Coordinates: 41.7308°N 72.7903°W

- Type: Public
- Established: 1968
- Dean: Bruce T. Liang
- Academic staff: 420
- Students: 756
- Location: Farmington, Connecticut, US
- Campus: Suburban
- Website: medicine.uchc.edu

The University of Connecticut School of Medicine is a medical school located in Farmington, Connecticut. It was founded in 1961, enrolled students in 1968, and graduated its first class in 1972.

The school is part of UConn Health, along with the University of Connecticut School of Dental Medicine, Graduate School of Biomedical Sciences, and John Dempsey Hospital. UConn Health is also a renowned biomedical research center, specializing in genetics, aging, orthopaedics and neurology/neurosurgery. In 2012, Dr. Cato Laurencin’s research on ACL tissue regeneration was named one of National Geographic’s 100 Scientific Discoveries That Changed the World.

== History ==
The School of Medicine was established in 1961 following legislation by the Connecticut General Assembly. The vote set aside $2 million to plan and develop medical and dental schools for the residents of Connecticut. In 1962, the 106-acre campus in Farmington, seven miles west of Hartford, was selected from forty different options. Dr. Lyman Maynard Stowe was appointed to be the first dean of the medical school; however, Stowe died unexpectedly in 1965 and John Patterson was named dean. The medical school opened its doors in 1968 in a temporary building while construction of the building continued. Construction was completed in 1972, the same year the school graduated its first class of twenty-nine physicians. Along with the medical and dental schools, John Dempsey Hospital, named after the governor who signed the initial legislation, was established as a 137-bed university hospital and admitted its first patient in 1975.

== Admissions ==
In 2014, the School of Medicine enrolled 98 students from 52 different colleges, with an average undergraduate GPA of 3.7, and an average MCAT score of 31.9. The school is considered highly selective, matriculating only 3.3% of applicants. While 76% of students are Connecticut residents, eleven countries of origin are represented in the most recent class. The school offers multiple tuition options in which in-state students pay $34,405, students from the other New England states pay $53,960, and out-of-New England students pay $63,259. After one year, all students are eligible for in-state tuition.

Aside from the M.D. degree program, students can earn a number of dual degrees. These include M.D./Ph.D., M.D./J.D., M.D./M.B.A., and M.D./M.P.H. Students are also able to participate in a scholarly year, during which they can supplement their education in a manner other than an additional degree. These opportunities include experiences abroad, an educational project, translational research, or epidemiological research, among many others. The school also admits highly-qualified high school students through the Combined Program in Medicine. This 8-year program allows high-school students with an interest in medicine direct admission to the medical school, provided that certain academic standards and contingencies are met. Finally, the school offers a highly-selective post-baccalaureate program for students who were not pre-medical majors in college and need to complete basic science coursework in order to apply to medical school. A significant percentage of the program’s graduates go on to attend the UConn School of Medicine.

== Curriculum ==
The curriculum at UConn consists of three phases taking place over a four-year period. The goal of the curriculum is for students to fulfill competencies aligned with the ACGME competencies, including patient-care, medical knowledge, practice-based learning and improvement, interpersonal and communication skills, professionalism, and systems-based practice. During their first and second years, students are enrolled in Phase 1, which covers core basic science instruction and the foundations of clinical medicine. In a unique fashion, medical students and dental students study the core basic sciences together for two years. Phase 2 takes place during the third year and provides core clinical experiences consisting of both inpatient and outpatient experiences. During this year, students return to the main UConn Health campus for a Home Week experience integrating concepts related to patient safety, clinical reasoning, and career development. Fourth-year students’ education culminates with phase 3, a highly customizable phase of advanced clinical experiences, electives, and a selective (which allows students to complete a capstone project). More recently a boot camp experience has been added to prepare the graduating students for residency.

First, second, and third year students participate in student continuity practice (SCP), a primary care continuity curriculum that provides students with a longitudinal immersion and mentoring experience in a community based generalist practice. The 250 community based faculty who participate in SCP include internists, family medicine practitioners, and pediatricians. Many students also elect to participate in the Urban Service Track, an interdisciplinary program for students committed to serving Connecticut’s underserved and urban populations.

In 2016, a new curriculum, currently under development named M-DELTA (Making a Difference in Education, Learning and Teaching Across the Curriculum) was instituted. As part of BioScience Connecticut (see below), a new academic addition was built to support the pedagogy of team-based learning.

== Affiliate hospitals and clinical sites ==
The school has five major affiliate institutions: Hartford Hospital, Saint Francis Hospital & Medical Center, The Hospital of Central Connecticut, John Dempsey Hospital at UConn Health, and Connecticut Children's Medical Center. Students spend time at these sites and also at many community partner sites including other hospitals, clinics and private offices. This provides UConn students with a well-rounded view of a variety of pathology, communities and patient demographics.

== Deans ==
- Lyman Maynard Stowe: 1963-1965
- John W. Patterson: 1965-1971
- Robert U. Massey: 1971-1984
- Eugene M. Sigman: 1985-1992
- Ward E. Bullock: 1994-1995
- Peter J. Deckers: 1995-2008
- Cato T. Laurencin: 2008-2011
- Frank M. Torti: 2011-2014
- Bruce T. Liang: 2015-present

== Bioscience Connecticut ==
In May 2011, Governor Dannel P. Malloy announced Bioscience Connecticut The $864 million project will create a new hospital tower, new outpatient center, and renovate existing facilities as well as renovate and expand the medical and dental schools. The project will increase enrollment at the schools, each by 30% and establish a loan forgiveness program for those who commit to a career as primary care physicians in Connecticut. Renovations to the academic building are ongoing and expected to be completed by early 2017. The Bioscience Connecticut project will be completed in 2018.

As part of the Bioscience Connecticut initiative, the renowned biomedical research institution, The Jackson Laboratory has expanded and built the Jackson Laboratory for Genomic Medicine on the UConn Health campus. Over the last decade, the State of Connecticut has been a pioneer in stem-cell research.
