= Connecticut Children's Medical Center =

Geography
- Location: 282 Washington Street, Hartford, Connecticut, United States
- Coordinates: 41.753679°N 72.681676°W

Organization
- Type: Children's hospital
- Affiliated university: University of Connecticut School of Medicine; Frank H. Netter MD School of Medicine at Quinnipiac University

Services
- Emergency department: Level 1 Pediatric Trauma Center
- Beds: 185

History
- Constructed: October 1993
- Opened: Newington Children's Hospital: 1898; Connecticut Children's Medical Center: 1996

Links
- Website: Connecticut Children's
- Lists: Hospitals in Connecticut

Connecticut Children's Medical Center is a nationally ranked, independent, non-profit, pediatric acute care hospital located in Hartford, Connecticut. The hospital has 230 beds and is the primary pediatric teaching affiliate of the University of Connecticut School of Medicine and the Frank H. Netter MD School of Medicine at Quinnipiac University. The hospital provides comprehensive pediatric specialties and subspecialties to pediatric patients aged 0–21 throughout Connecticut and the New England region, but also treats some adults that would be better treated under pediatricians. Connecticut Children's Medical Center also features the only ACS verified level 1 pediatric trauma center in the region, and 1 of 2 in the state. The hospital is also 1 of 2 children's hospital in the state of Connecticut.

== History ==
Connecticut Children's Medical Center was founded as the Newington Home for Incurables in Newington, CT in 1898 by the Connecticut Children's Aid Society.

It eventually was expanded and renamed the Newington Children's Hospital in 1968, and in 1986 signed an agreement with Hartford Hospital to open a new children's hospital in Hartford. The University of Connecticut also agreed to move its pediatric medicine and residency program to the new hospital.

On March 30, 1996, pediatric patients from the Newington Children's Hospital, Hartford Hospital, the University of Connecticut Health Center in Farmington, CT were relocated to the newly opened Connecticut Children's Medical Center.

The grand opening ceremonies were held on April 2, 1996. The new eight-story hospital contained 315,000 square feet and was built on a foundation that will allow the hospital to double its space by building straight up, allowing for potential future expansion.

In 2016 officials from Yale New Haven Children's Hospital announced that they were in preliminary talks with Connecticut Children's Medical Center to merge and form an independent children's hospital system. The plan called for a formation of a board that managed both hospitals with the alliance named Kidco. In 2017 talks of merger ended when a disagreement over what system the new hospital would be in, with Yale New Haven Children's Hospital wanting the system to be a part of Yale, and Connecticut Children's wanting the system to be completely independent.

In January 2020 a small team of pediatric surgeons from CCMC travelled to caribbean country, Haiti to perform surgery on children in need of operations that were not routinely available in Haiti. Staff from CCMC were complemented by doctors from Children's National Hospital who were also there to perform complex pediatric surgeries.

In early March 2020, Connecticut Children's teamed up with Teen Cancer America to open up an adolescent and young adult cancer unit for teens and young adults aged 15–30 throughout the region.

In March 2020, CCMC announced that they would furlough 400 employees to help cut costs amidst the 2020 COVID-19 pandemic. In addition to the furloughs, the system would eliminate 31 jobs. The estimated savings amounted to $20 million for the hospital.

On October 12, 2020, Connecticut Children's and Hartford HealthCare announced a pediatric alliance to better coordinate medical care between hospitals.

In 2026, Connecticut Children's reached a settlement with the Trump Department of Justice in which they agreed to halt transgender healthcare under the age of 19 for a ten-year period, in exchange for the records of their transgender patients remaining protected from seizure.

== About ==
The hospital serves more than 15,000 children in primary care services, 60,000 in emergency care services, and 6000 in surgical services annually. The hospital also provides intensive care for children suffering traumatic injury or illness and neonatal care for children born premature or critically ill. The main campus is located on Washington Street in Hartford, directly adjacent to the main campus of Hartford Hospital. In addition to their main hospital, CCMC contracts out to other hospitals in the region to provide pediatric services. Other locations include Waterbury, Farmington, Glastonbury, and Shelton, all in Connecticut.

The main hospital has 230 beds.

== Awards ==
The Connecticut Children's Medical Center has been recognized as one of the leading pediatric hospitals in the United States by the 2019 Women's Choice Award for Best Children's Hospitals.

In 2020 Connecticut Children's was named a "center of excellence" by the National Society of Pediatric Sedation, one of only 10 children's hospitals nationally to receive the award.

In addition, the hospital was ranked as the second best children's hospital in Connecticut (after Yale New Haven Children's Hospital).

In 2024, Connecticut Children's was ranked #28 in the Endocrinology specialty on Newsweek's list of America's Best Children's Hospitals.

== See also ==
- List of hospitals in Connecticut
- Yale New Haven Children's Hospital
- University of Connecticut Health Center
