= Alexandra Freeman =

Alexandra Freeman may refer to:

- Alexandra Freeman, Baroness Freeman of Steventon, British science communicator and former television producer
- Alexandra F. Freeman, American physician-scientist

== See also ==
- Alex Freeman (Alexander Michael Freeman), American soccer player
