= List of hospitals in Connecticut =

This is a list of hospitals in Connecticut, sorted by hospital name. The American Hospital Directory listed 51 hospitals in Connecticut in 2020.

== List ==
Connecticut Hospitals
Name	Network	City, town, or neighborhood	County	Emergency Department? (Trauma Level)	EMS Region	Opened-Closed	Status / Type / Notes
Backus Hospital	Hartford HealthCare	Norwich	New London	Yes (Level III)	IV	1893–present	Active
Bridgeport Hospital	Yale New Haven Health	Bridgeport	Fairfield	Yes (Level II)	I	1878–present	Active
Bristol Hospital	Bristol Health	Bristol	Hartford	Yes	III		Active
Cedarcrest Hospital	Department of Mental Health	Newington	Hartford	No	III	1910–2010	Closed - Originally named Hartford County Home for the Care and Treatment of Persons Suffering from Tuberculosis. Renamed in 1912 as Hartford State Sanatorium. Renamed in 1976 to Cedarcrest Regional Hospital.
Charlotte Hungerford Hospital	Hartford HealthCare	Torrington	Litchfield	Yes	V	1916–present	Active
Connecticut Children's Medical Center		Hartford	Hartford	Yes (Level I Pedi)	III	1898–present	Active - Pediatric hospital. Originally named Newington Home for Incurables. Renamed in 1968 to Newington Children's Hospital. Relocated and named Connecticut Children's Medical Center in 1996.
Connecticut Colony for Epileptics		Mansfield	Tolland		IV	1910–1917	Succeeded - Merged with the Connecticut Training School for the Feebleminded at Lakeville in 1917, forming the Mansfield Training School and Hospital.
Connecticut Hospice		Branford	New Haven	No	II		Active - Hospice and palliative care hospital
Connecticut Training School for the Feebleminded at Lakeville		Lakeville	Litchfield		V	1860–1917	Succeeded - Originally named the Merged with the Connecticut Colony for Epileptics in 1917, forming the Mansfield Training School and Hospital.
Connecticut Valley Hospital	Department of Mental Health and Addiction Services	Middletown	Middlesex	No	III	1868–present	Active - State-run behavioral health hospital
Danbury Hospital	Northwell Health	Danbury	Fairfield	Yes (Level II)	V	1885–present	Active
Day Kimball Hospital	Day Kimball Healthcare	Putnam	Windham	Yes	IV	1894–present	Active
Elmcrest Hospital	Hartford Hospital	Portland	Middlesex		III	1942–c. 2006	Closed - Behavioral health hospital
Gaylord Hospital	Gaylord Specialty Healthcare	Wallingford	New Haven	Yes	II		Active
Greenwich Hospital	Yale New Haven Health	Greenwich	Fairfield	Yes (Level III)	I	1903–present	Active
Griffin Hospital	Griffin Health	Derby	New Haven	Yes	II	1909–present	Active
Hartford Hospital	Hartford HealthCare	Hartford	Hartford	Yes (Level I)	III	1854–present	Active
Hospital for Special Care	Independent	New Britain	Hartford	No	III		Active
The Hospital of Central Connecticut – Bradley Memorial Campus	Hartford HealthCare	Southington	Hartford	Yes (Level III)	III		Active
The Hospital of Central Connecticut – New Britain General Campus	Hartford HealthCare	New Britain	Hartford	Yes	III		Active
The Institute of Living	Hartford HealthCare	Hartford	Hartford	No	III	1824–present	Active - Behavioral health hospital. Originally named Connecticut Retreat for the Insane, later named Hartford Retreat.
Johnson Memorial Hospital	Trinity Health of New England	Stafford Springs	Tolland	Yes	III		Active
Lawrence+Memorial Hospital	Yale New Haven Health	New London	New London	Yes	IV	1912–present	Active
Manchester Memorial Hospital	Hartford Healthcare	Manchester	Hartford	Yes	III	1920–present	Active
Mansfield Training School and Hospital		Mansfield	Tolland		IV	1917–1993	Closed - Formed in 1917 from merger of Connecticut Training School for the Feebleminded at Lakeville and Connecticut Colony for Epileptics.
Meriden–Wallingford Hospital		Meriden	New Haven		II	XXXX–1991	Succeeded - Merged with the World War II Veterans Memorial Hospital in 1991, forming the Veterans Memorial Medical Center.
Middlesex Hospital	Independent	Middletown	Middlesex	Yes	III	1904–present	Active
MidState Medical Center	Hartford HealthCare	Meriden	New Haven	Yes	II	1991–present	Active - Formed in 1991 from the merger of the Meriden–Wallingford Hospital and the World War II Veterans Memorial Hospital. Originally named the Veterans Memorial Medical Center.
Milford Hospital	Yale New Haven Health	Milford	New Haven	Yes	II	1920–present	Active
Mount Sinai Rehabilitation Hospital	Trinity Health of New England	Hartford	Hartford	No	III	1923–present	Active - Rehabilitation hospital
Natchaug Hospital	Hartford HealthCare	Mansfield Center	Tolland	No	IV		Active - Behavioral health hospital
New Milford Hospital	Northwell Health	New Milford	Litchfield	Yes	V	1921–present	Active
Norwalk Hospital	Northwell Health	Norwalk	Fairfield	Yes (Level II)	I	1893–present	Active
Norwich State Hospital	Department of Mental Health	Preston, Norwich	New London		IV	1904–1996	Closed
Park City Hospital		Bridgeport	Fairfield		I		Closed
Rockville General Hospital	Hartford HealthCare	Vernon	Tolland	Yes	III		Active
Saint Francis Hospital & Medical Center	Trinity Health of New England	Hartford	Hartford	Yes (Level I)	III	1897–present	Active
Saint Joseph's Medical Center		Stamford	Fairfield		I		Closed
Saint Mary's Hospital	Trinity Health of New England	Waterbury	New Haven	Yes (Level II)	V	1907–present	Active
Saint Vincent's Medical Center	Hartford HealthCare	Bridgeport	Fairfield	Yes (Level II)	I	1903–present	Active
The Seaside		Waterford	New London		IV		Closed
Sharon Hospital	Northwell Health	Sharon	Litchfield	Yes	V		Active
Silver Hill Hospital		New Canaan	Fairfield	No	I	1931–present	Active - Behavioral health hospital
Stamford Hospital	Stamford Health	Stamford	Fairfield	Yes (Level II)	I	1896–present	Active
UConn John Dempsey Hospital	UConn Health	Farmington	Hartford	Yes	III	1961–present	Active
Uncas-on-Thames Hospital		Norwich	New London		IV		Closed
Waterbury Hospital	UConn Health	Waterbury	New Haven	Yes (Level II)	V		Active
West Haven VA Medical Center	VA Connecticut Healthcare System	West Haven	New Haven	Yes	II		Active
Windham Hospital	Hartford HealthCare	Willimantic	Windham	Yes	IV	1933–present	Active
Winsted Memorial Hospital	Hartford HealthCare	Winsted	Litchfield	Yes	V		Active - Formerly inpatient, now only provides emergency services.
World War II Veterans Memorial Hospital		Meriden	New Haven		II	XXXX–1991	Succeeded - Merged with the Meriden–Wallingford Hospital in 1991, forming the Veterans Memorial Medical Center.
Yale New Haven Children's Hospital	Yale New Haven Health	New Haven	New Haven	Yes (Level I Pedi)	II	1993–present	Active - Pediatric hospital
Yale New Haven Hospital	Yale New Haven Health	New Haven	New Haven	Yes (Level I)	II	1826–present	Active
Yale New Haven Hospital – Saint Raphael Campus	Yale New Haven Health	New Haven	New Haven	Yes	II	1907–present	Active - Originally named the Hospital of Saint Raphael. Acquired by Yale New Haven Hospital in 2012, becoming a campus of that hospital.
Yale New Haven Psychiatric Hospital	Yale New Haven Health	New Haven	New Haven	No	II		Active - Behavioral health hospital
