= Backus Hospital =

Hospital in Connecticut, US

Coordinates: 41.5435°N 72.0868°W

- Hartford HealthCare

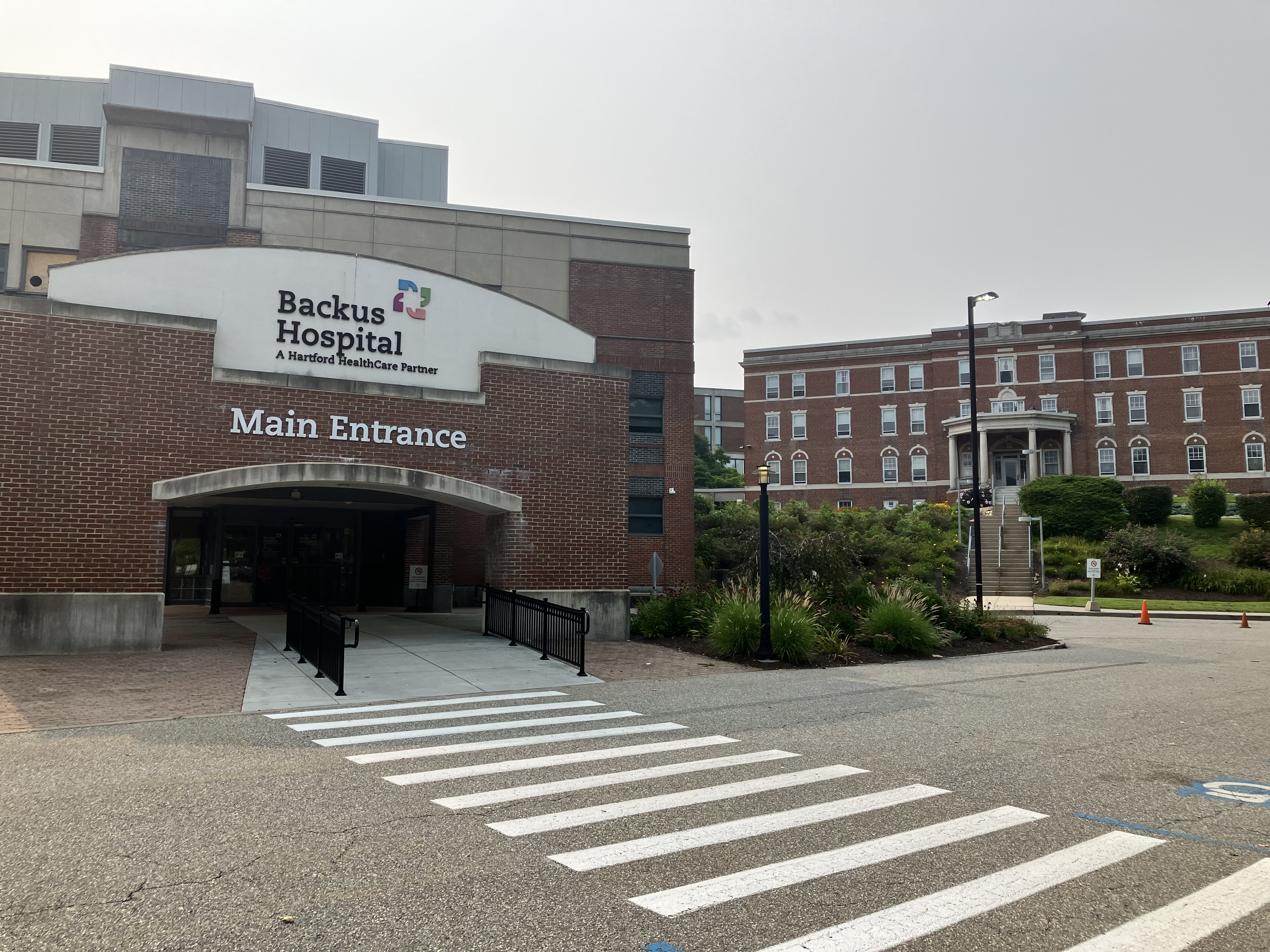
- Entrance to Backus Hospital in 2024

Geography
- Location: Norwich, Connecticut, United States

Services
- Emergency department: Level III trauma center
- Beds: 213

Helipads
- Helipad: FAA LID: CT93
Number	Length		Surface
Number	ft	m	Surface
H1	42	13	Concrete

History
- Opened: 1893

Links
- Website: www.backushospital.org
- Lists: Hospitals in Connecticut

The William W. Backus Hospital is a 213-bed, not-for-profit, acute care community hospital in Norwich, Connecticut. Backus Hospital provides inpatient care for approximately 11,000 patients each year, and has more than 400,000 outpatient visits. The hospital operates outpatient centers in Colchester, Montville, Ledyard, and Plainfield; and the Backus Outpatient Care Center in Norwich.

== History ==
The hospital was founded in 1893 by William Wolcott Backus and William A. Slater, in response to the region's growing healthcare needs.

In 2008, Backus Hospital's Cancer Center received the American College of Surgeons Commission on Cancer's Outstanding Achievement Award, placing it among an elite group of cancer centers nationwide. In 2008, the hospital also earned the John D. Thompson Award for eliminating central line infections in its Critical Care Unit.

In Dec 2015, the Board of Trustees named Bimal Patel President and Chief Executive Officer, effective January 2016.

Backus Hospital operates the state's only trauma center east of the Connecticut River, and it is the only regional facility that has a helipad and support facility for LIFE STAR, Hartford Hospital's air ambulance helicopter. LIFE STAR patients are taken to Level I or Level II trauma centers across the state, according to state regulations. It is the most profitable hospital in the Hartford Healthcare System.

On October 13, 2020, about 400 nurses at the hospital went on strike over contract negotiations and issues related to the COVID-19 pandemic.

== See also ==
- List of hospitals in Connecticut
