= Manchester Memorial Hospital =

Hospital in Connecticut, US

Coordinates: 41.7821°N 72.5255°W

- Hartford Healthcare

Geography
- Location: Manchester, Connecticut, United States

Organization
- Care system: Private, Non-profit

Services
- Beds: 249

History
- Founded: 1920

Links
- Website: www.echn.org/hospitals/manchester/default.aspx
- Lists: Hospitals in Connecticut

Manchester Memorial Hospital is a 249-bed community hospital located in central Manchester, Connecticut, an eastern Connecticut community about 10 minutes east of Hartford. The hospital opened in 1920, and was dedicated as a memorial to all Manchester residents who died during the First World War. In 1970, the hospital was rededicated as a memorial to veterans of all wars. The hospital operates a family medicine residency training program for newly graduated osteopathic physicians.

On January 12, 2025, Prospect Medical filed for Chapter 11 bankruptcy protection, listing assets and liabilities between $1 billion and $10 billion. The company struggled with rising interest costs and high debt. In January 2026, Hartford Healthcare completed their purchase of Manchester Memorial from Prospect.

== See also ==
- List of hospitals in Connecticut
