= Mount Sinai Hospital (Hartford) =

Coordinates: 41.7733°N 72.6997°W

Geography
- Location: 490 Blue Hills Avenue, Hartford, Connecticut, United States

History
- Founded: 1923

Links
- Lists: Hospitals in Connecticut

Mount Sinai Hospital in Hartford, Connecticut was a hospital founded in 1923, to provide a facility for Jewish doctors who, due to their religion, were unable to obtain staff privileges in other hospitals in the area.

== History ==
In 1995 it merged with Saint Francis Hospital & Medical Center, which had been affiliated with Mount Sinai Hospital since 1990, the first recorded instance of collaboration between a Catholic hospital and a Jewish hospital in United States. The facilities that once housed the hospital are now designated as the Mount Sinai Campus of Saint Francis Care.
