= Middlesex Hospital (Connecticut) =

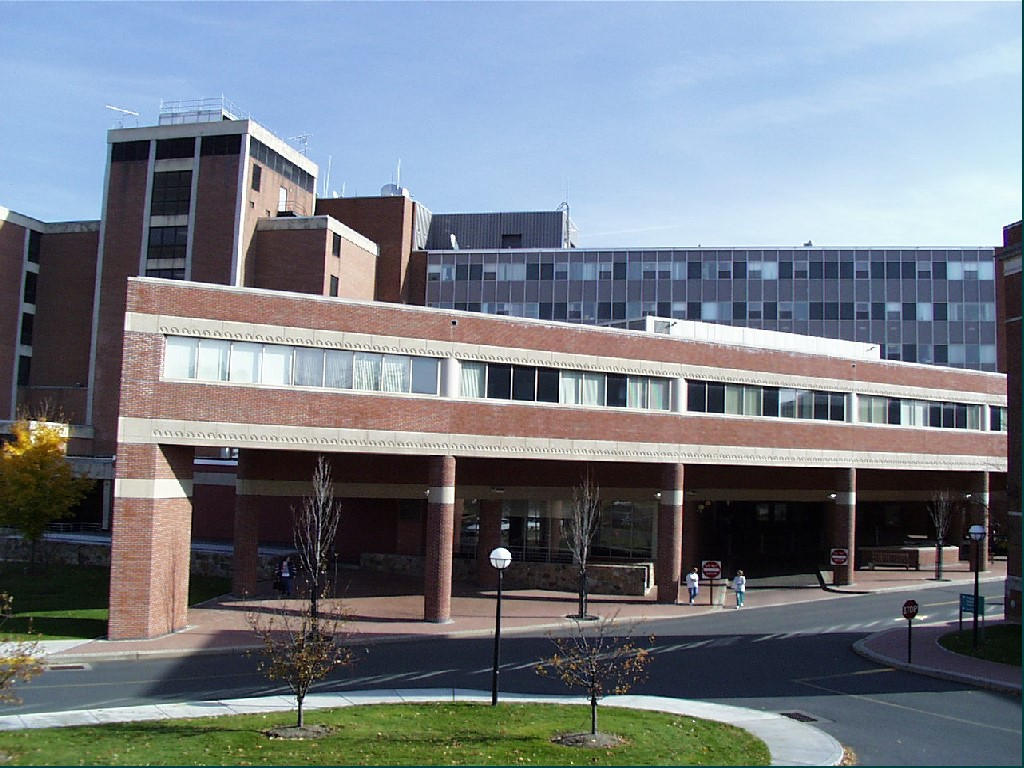
- Main entrance of Middlesex Hospital

Geography
- Location: 28 Crescent Street, Middletown, Connecticut, United States
- Coordinates: 41°33′16.097″N 72°38′49.430″W

Organization
- Type: General

Services
- Beds: 297

Helipads
- Helipad: FAA LID: CT98
Number	Length		Surface
Number	ft	m	Surface
H1	45	14	Mats

History
- Founded: 1904

Links
- Website: middlesexhospital.org
- Lists: Hospitals in Connecticut

Middlesex Hospital is a non-profit, acute care community hospital in Middletown, Connecticut. It is a subsidiary of Middlesex Health System, Inc.

Its service area includes Middlesex County, Connecticut, and the lower Connecticut River Valley region. In 2015 Middlesex became the first hospital in Connecticut to join the Mayo Clinic Care Network.

== History ==
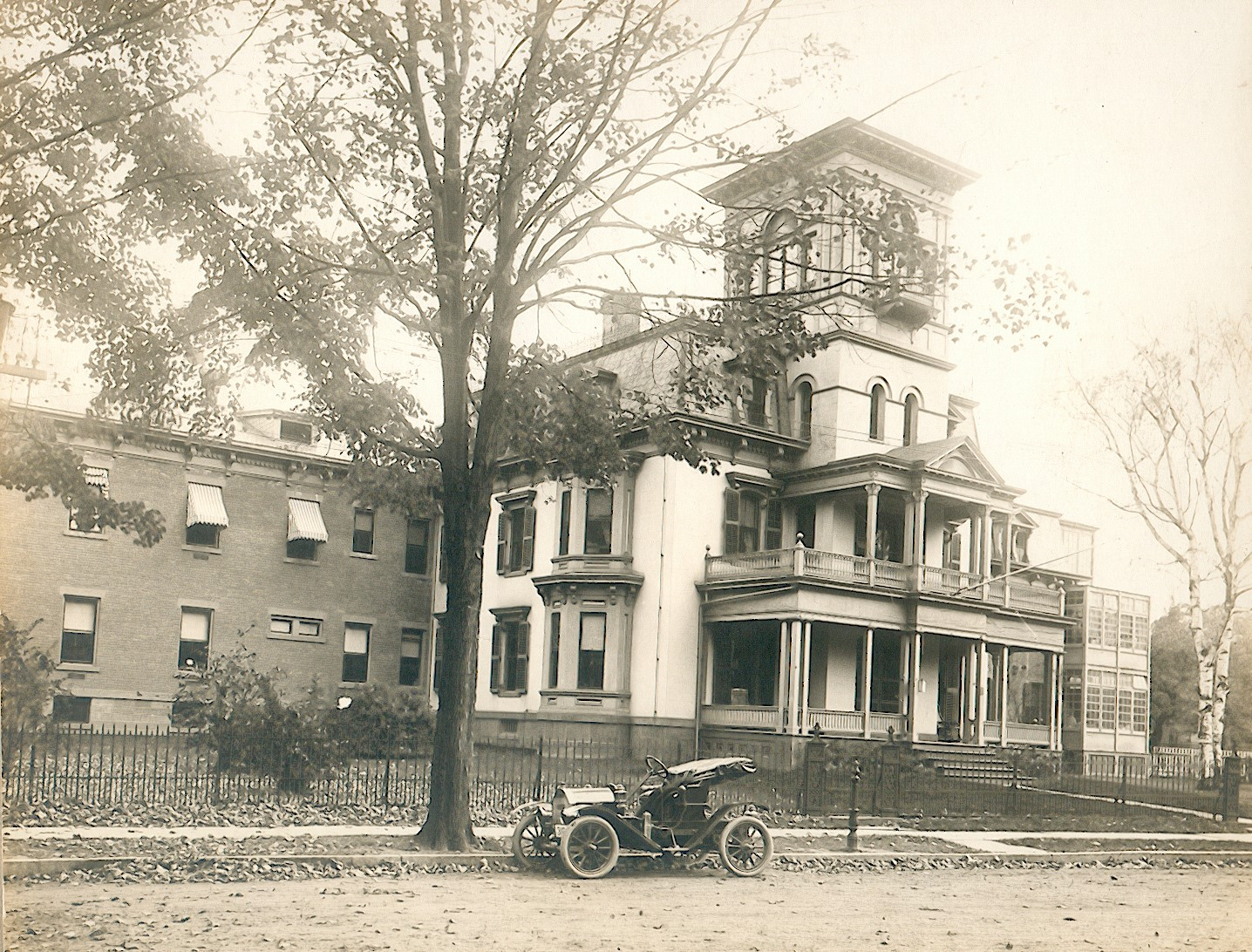
The original Middlesex Hospital building as seen in 1908, this is the old Camp homestead

In 1895 the Connecticut General Assembly issued a charter incorporating Middlesex Hospital. With a $20,000 grant from the state, and the gift of the Camp Homestead on Crescent Street, the hospital opened in the spring of 1904.

The hospital's nursing school graduated nurses from 1910 until the Ona M. Wilcox School of Nursing closed in 1997.

In July 2025, the estate of Gay Sherman Weintz filed a lawsuit in Middletown Superior Court citing negligent care leading to her death on April 22, 2024. That same month, Middlesex Hospital submitted a corrective action plan following Connecticut State Department of Public Health reports cited failures, including with regard to the patient death on the previous April 22.

== Operations ==
Middlesex Hospital provides inpatient medical, surgical and emergency services, as well as outpatient care, including diagnostic, rehabilitation, behavioral health, disease management, radiology, laboratory, cancer care, homecare, wound and ostomy care, surgical services, urgent care, and a network of primary care offices. Middlesex is licensed for 297 beds, 33 bassinets and serves a total population of over 250,000 persons. The hospital employs over 3,500 people and has 381 active medical staff, 77 courtesy medical staff, and 142 allied health professionals.

The hospital has a family medicine residency program and a radiologic technology school. In addition to its emergency department in Middletown, the health system operates two satellite medical centers in Westbrook, Connecticut, and Marlborough, Connecticut, with fully accredited, stand-alone emergency departments. Combined, the three locations serve the 4th highest emergency patient volume of all Connecticut hospitals. In 2022 the hospital had 11,902 discharges and 77,805 emergency department visits.

=== New ambulance facility ===
In October 2025, the Middletown Planning and Zoning commission approved the demolition of 4 and 8 Crescent St. and 80 South Main St. A new ambulance facility will be constructed to house Middlesex's ambulance fleet in a climate controlled environment.

== Services ==
=== Walk-In Urgent Care ===
Middlesex Hospital Urgent Care handles non-emergency medical care in Madison, Connecticut, Middletown and Old Saybrook, Connecticut.

=== Cancer Center ===
The Cancer Center offers radiation oncology, medical oncology and supportive services with diagnostic radiology including PET scan, CT scan and MRI close by. The cancer program is an ACoS-approved Comprehensive Community Cancer Center.

=== Comprehensive Breast Center ===
Middlesex Hospital is accredited by the American College of Surgeons National Accreditation Program for Breast Centers as a Comprehensive Breast Center. The Breast Center is located at 540 Saybrook Road.

=== Home Care / Hospice Program ===
The hospital provides Homecare, hospice and palliative care home visits. The hospice program is Medicare-certified and includes homecare as well as in-patient care within the hospital. It was established in 1985.

=== Pregnancy and Birth Center ===
The Pregnancy & Birth Center at Middlesex Hospital is designated as “Baby-Friendly” by Baby-Friendly USA. The Baby-Friendly Hospital initiative recognizes hospitals that provide an optimal level of care and information for breastfeeding moms.

=== Centers of Excellence ===
The hospital has Joint Commission approved Centers of Excellence in stroke, joint replacement for hips and knees, and bariatrics. The Middlesex Hospital Center for Joint Replacement has earned The Joint Commission Gold Seal of Approval® for hip and knee replacements.

== Awards and recognition ==
=== Leader in LGBTQ Healthcare Equality ===
In 2018, Middlesex Hospital earned a "Leader in LGBTQ Healthcare Equality" designation from the Human Rights Campaign Foundation.

=== Leapfrog Group report card ===
In 2024, Middlesex Hospital received an A grade for safety from the Leapfrog Group.

=== Magnet Hospital ===
On June 1, 2001, Middlesex Hospital became Connecticut's first Magnet hospital by the American Nurses Credentialing Center (ANCC), an arm of the American Nurses Association. The hospital has retained its designation since 2001.

=== Top 100 Hospitals ===
Middlesex Hospital has been designated four times as one of the Thomson Reuters 100 Top Hospitals.

=== Best Health Care Rankings ===
Middlesex Hospital achieved the highest rating possible from U.S. News & World Report's hospital rankings in chronic obstructive pulmonary disease (COPD), heart failure, colon cancer surgery, and hip replacement.

=== Joint Commission Top Performers ===
The Hospital was recognized as part of The Joint Commission’s 2015 annual report “America’s Hospitals: Improving Quality and Safety,” for attaining and sustaining excellence in accountability for key quality measures for:

- heart attack
- heart failure
- Pneumonia
- surgical care
- venous thromboembolism
- perinatal care

=== Healthgrades Quality Awards ===
Middlesex Hospital was recognized by Healthgrades for the following five clinical and hospital quality awards:

- America's 100 Best Hospitals for Pulmonary Care Award 2015, 2016, 2017
- America's 100 Best Hospitals for Stroke Care Award 2016, 2017
- Critical Care Excellence Award 2017
- Distinguished Hospital Award for Clinical Excellence 2016
- Outstanding Patient Experience Award 2014, 2016

Middlesex was the only hospital in Connecticut to receive the Patient Experience Award in 2014, and one of only two in 2016.

Middlesex Hospital received an award for Clinical Excellence in 2017 for rating in the top 5% of hospitals in the nation with the lowest risk-adjusted mortality and complication rates across at least 21 of 32 common conditions and procedures.
