= Day Kimball Hospital =

Coordinates: 41.9066°N 71.9140°W

- Day Kimball Healthcare

Geography
- Location: 320 Pomfret Street, Putnam, Connecticut, United States

Organization
- Type: Teaching
- Affiliated university: Day Kimball Healthcare
- Network: Day Kimball Healthcare

Services
- Emergency department: Yes

Helipads
- Helipad: Yes

History
- Founded: 1894

Links
- Website: www.daykimball.org
- Lists: Hospitals in Connecticut

Day Kimball Hospital is an acute care facility located in the West End of Putnam, Connecticut. Day Kimball Hospital was established in 1894. The hospital campus is located on Pomfret St in Putnam, and is directly adjacent to the main office of the Day Kimball Healthcare building.

== Background ==
The hospital opened in 1894 after Mrs. M. Day Kimball donated $5,000 for the construction of the infirmary building in memory of her recently deceased son, Day Kimball, with the condition that the hospital be named after him. Other family members made donations which came to a total of $9,000.

The hospital is now a 104-bed acute care community hospital that specializes in hip and knee replacement, specialty care maternity, and primary stroke. They have been awarded 4 stars for their standards of care on medicare.gov.

== See also ==
- List of hospitals in Connecticut
