= Windham Hospital =

- Hartford HealthCare
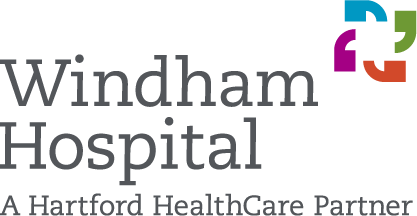

Geography
- Location: 112 Mansfield Avenue, Willimantic, Connecticut, United States
- Coordinates: 41.7173432°N 72.2259329°W

Organization
- Type: Community

Helipads
- Helipad: FAA LID: 0CT2
Number	Length		Surface
Number	ft	m	Surface
H1	65	20	Asphalt

History
- Founded: April 5, 1933

Links
- Website: windhamhospital.org
- Lists: Hospitals in Connecticut

Windham Hospital is a private, nonprofit community care hospital in Willimantic, Connecticut. It first opened in 1933. The 130-bed hospital is part of the Hartford HealthCare system.
