= Alexandra F. Freeman =

American pediatric infectious diseases physician

Alexandria F. Freeman
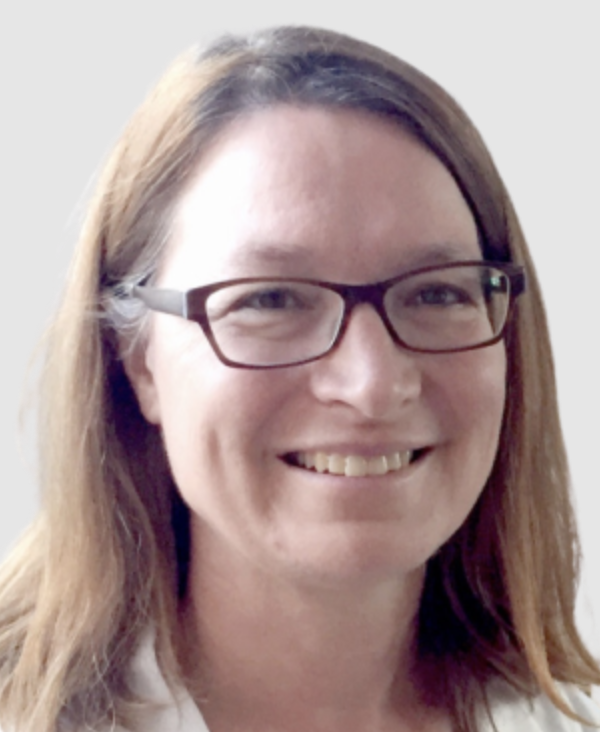
- Education: Carleton College; Georgetown University
- Scientific career
- Fields: Pediatric infectious diseases, primary immunodeficiencies
- Workplaces: Georgetown University; National Institutes of Health

Alexandra F. Freeman is an American physician-scientist specializing in pediatric infectious diseases and primary immunodeficiencies. She is a senior clinician at the National Institute of Allergy and Infectious Diseases (NIAID), where her research focuses on hyperimmunoglobulin E syndromes and immune disorders.

== Education ==
Freeman earned a B.A. in biology from Carleton College in 1992. She received a M.D. degree from Georgetown University School of Medicine in 1997. Following medical school, she completed a pediatrics residency at Yale New Haven Children's Hospital from 1997 to 2000. She then pursued a pediatric infectious disease fellowship at Children's Memorial Hospital from 2000 to 2004.

== Career ==
Freeman began her career as a medical officer in the HIV/AIDS malignancy branch at the National Cancer Institute (NCI) from 2004 to 2005. She then joined the laboratory of clinical infectious diseases at the National Institute of Allergy and Infectious Diseases (NIAID) as a staff clinician from 2005 to 2008.

From 2006 to 2008, she held an assistant professor position in the department of pediatrics at Georgetown University Hospital, where she was affiliated with the pediatric infectious diseases program. In 2008, she transitioned to a role as Physician II at SAIC-Frederick, working in the clinical monitoring research branch in support of the NIAID laboratory of clinical infectious diseases at the Frederick National Laboratory for Cancer Research. She held this position until 2009, when she returned to NIAID at first as a staff clinician and later senior clinician.

Freeman's early research focused on pediatric HIV. In 2005, she shifted her focus to primary immunodeficiencies, including hyperimmunoglobulin E syndromes. At NIAID, Freeman works in the primary immune deficiency clinic, where she is involved in the diagnosis, evaluation, and management of patients with primary immunodeficiencies, particularly hyper-IgE syndromes. She has studied patients with STAT3-mutated Hyper-IgE syndrome (STAT3 DN; Job's syndrome), which involves eczema, recurrent infections, and connective tissue abnormalities.

Her research has examined the role of STAT3 in immunity, infection susceptibility, and tissue remodeling. She has also investigated treatment options, including hematopoietic stem cell transplantation and gene editing. Freeman is the director of the primary immunodeficiency clinic at NIAID, where she trains allergy and immunology fellows in diagnosing and managing primary immunodeficiencies.
