= Charlotte Hungerford Hospital =

- Hartford HealthCare

Geography
- Location: 540 Litchfield Street, Torrington, Connecticut, United States
- Coordinates: 41.7922°N 73.1339°W

Services
- Emergency department: Yes
- Beds: 109

History
- Founded: 1916

Links
- Website: http://www.charlottehungerford.org/
- Lists: Hospitals in Connecticut

The Charlotte Hungerford Hospital is a 109-bed community hospital located in Torrington, Connecticut.

It also provides emergency department and other services at the Winsted Health Center, owned by a private foundation in the historic building that housed the Litchfield County Hospital, later known as Winsted Memorial Hospital.

== Hospital rating data ==
The HealthGrades website contains the latest quality data for Charlotte Hungerford Hospital, as of 2015. For this rating section three different types of data from HealthGrades are presented: quality ratings for twenty inpatient conditions and procedures, twelve patient safety indicators and percentage of patients giving the hospital a 9 or 10 (the two highest possible ratings).

For inpatient conditions and procedures, there are three possible ratings: worse than expected, as expected and better than expected. For this hospital the data for this category is:

- Worse than expected – 2
- As expected – 15
- Better than expected – 3

For patient safety indicators, there are the same three possible ratings. For this hospital safety indicators were rated as:

- Worse than expected – 1
- As expected – 10
- Better than expected – 1

Data for patients giving this hospital a 9 or 10 are:

- Patients rating this hospital as a 9 or 10 – 59%
- Patients rating hospitals as a 9 or 10 nationally – 69%
