= Silver Hill Hospital =

Geography
- Location: Silvermine River Valley of Fairfield County, New Canaan, Connecticut, United States
- Coordinates: 41.165°N 73.469°W

Organization
- Type: Specialist

Services
- Beds: 129
- Speciality: Psychiatric hospital

History
- Founded: 1931

Links
- Website: silverhillhospital.org
- Lists: Hospitals in Connecticut

Silver Hill Hospital is a non-profit psychiatric hospital in New Canaan, Connecticut established in 1931. The hospital is accredited by the Joint Commission and provides behavioral health care treatment. This includes psychiatric and addiction services.

== History ==
The Silver Hill Foundation was established by William B. Terhune in 1934 as a "medical and psychotherapeutic unit to diagnose and treat functional nervous disorders". Terhune was the founder of the psychiatric department at Yale University and had promoted the idea that psychiatric patients not be treated differently than other patients with a medical condition. The original facility was established as a non-profit, voluntary psychiatric hospital and was a member of the American Hospital Association. It could treat up to 60 patients at a time.

In 1958, the Silver Hill Foundation dedicated a community clinic building located on the site of the former Silver Hill Inn. The setting was designed to help patients who presented as "nervous, depressed, anxious, or malingering". Located in the Silvermine River Valley of Fairfield County, the property straddles the borders of Wilton and New Canaan, Connecticut.

Starting in 1971, focus was placed on building the hospital's substance abuse program. By 1984, that program included a psychiatrist, an associate psychiatrist, a psychologist, substance abuse counselors, nursing staff, and a recreational and occupational therapist.

The inpatient acute care unit was built in 1985 to provide treatment to patients whose mental illness call for constant supervision.

In 2012, The Chronic Pain and Recovery Center program launched. In 2015, both an eating disorder program for adults and an outpatient opioid addiction program launched.

== Facilities ==
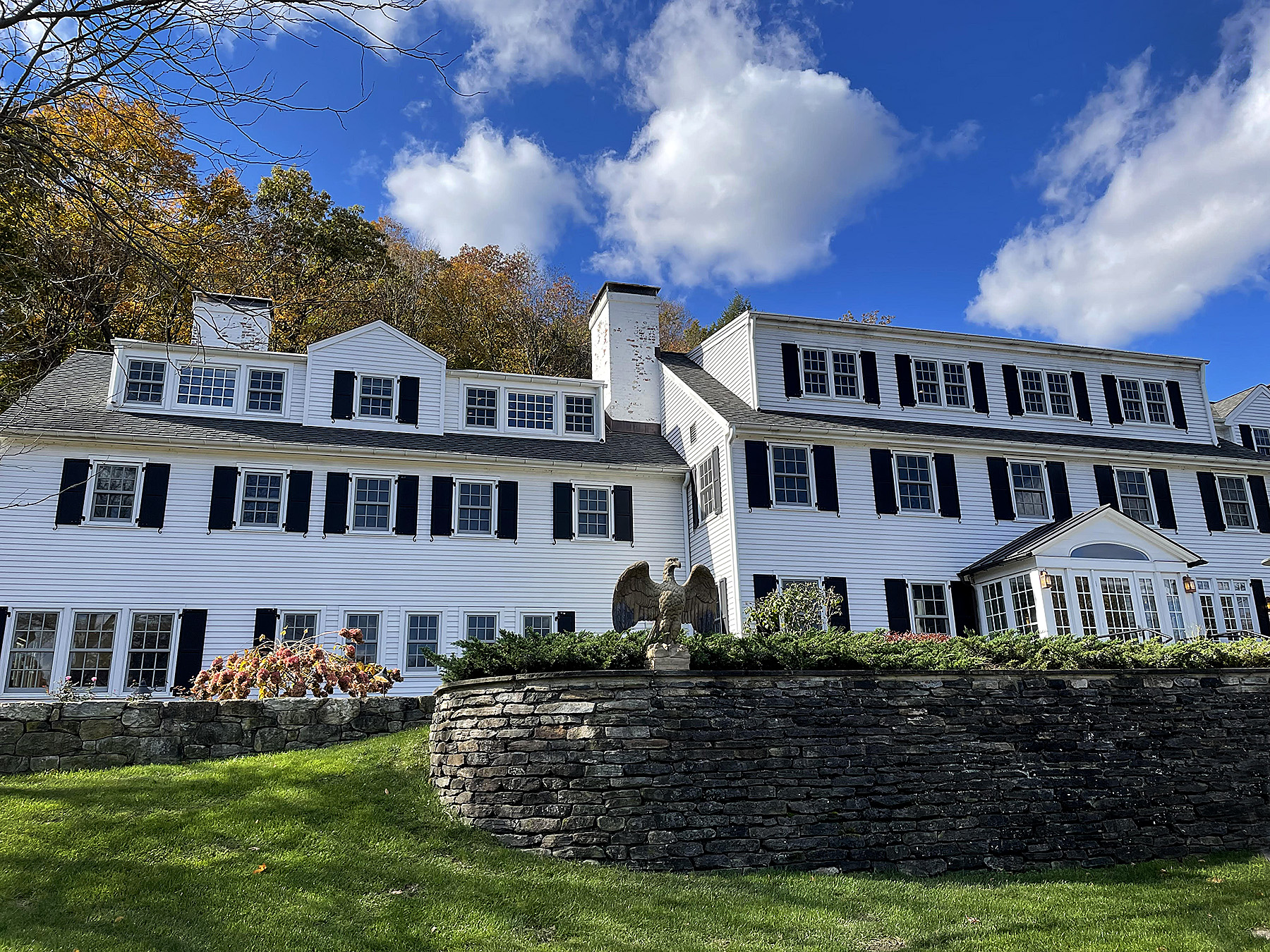
Main House

The hospital's 42-acre campus includes former family homes acquired by the hospital's board over time. These include:

- Scavetta House, which serves as an all-gender dual diagnosis (substance abuse, and something else) residential facility.
- Patricia Regnemer Main House, a three story building containing separate floors for adolescent and adult inpatient programs, as well as kitchen facilities.
- River House, a 1913 English Tudor style home that has served as a patient residence since the 1980s and now houses the Dialectical Behavior Therapy residential program, which helps patients diagnosed with Borderline Personality Disorder regulate feelings by charting emotions.
- Klingenstein House, a 1920s guesthouse that now houses the Adolescent Residential Program.
- Terhune built a chapel on the property, which was later named in his honor.

In 2006 Forbes named Silver Hill Hospital among its "Most Luxurious Places to Dry Out" and referenced its "idyllic New England boarding school campus".

== Notable patients ==
- John Vernou "Black Jack" Bouvier, the father of Jacqueline Kennedy Onassis, spent six weeks at Silver Hill in the 1950s for treatment of alcoholism. During his stay, Terhune encouraged Bouvier to drink large amounts of water and take walks on the property to curb any urges to drink. Bouvier was told to avoid discussing his drinking with anyone, including close family members. Upon his discharge, Bouvier quickly returned to drinking.
- CC Sabathia, a pitcher for the New York Yankees, spent a month at Silver Hill in 2015 for treatment of alcoholism.
- Billy Joel was admitted to Silver Hill for 10 days in 2002.
- Edie Sedgwick, 1960s model, actress and socialite, entered Silver Hill in the autumn of 1962 at age 19 to receive treatment for bulimia and anorexia.
- Gregg Allman spent time at the hospital in 1977.
- Truman Capote was treated for alcohol dependency at the hospital in 1976 following an arrest for drunk driving on Long Island. At the time he had also been addicted to pills.
- Nick Nolte was admitted in 2002 following an incident where he was arrested in California for driving under the influence of alcohol.
- Rita Hayworth was admitted to the facility in 1977 for alcohol and drug rehabilitation. At the time she was paying $2,000 per week for treatment.
- Oksana Baiul, an Olympic figure skater, was treated at the hospital in 1994 for three months.
- Nile Rogers was a patient of the hospital and been a supporter.
