= Greenwich Hospital (Connecticut) =

- Yale New Haven Health

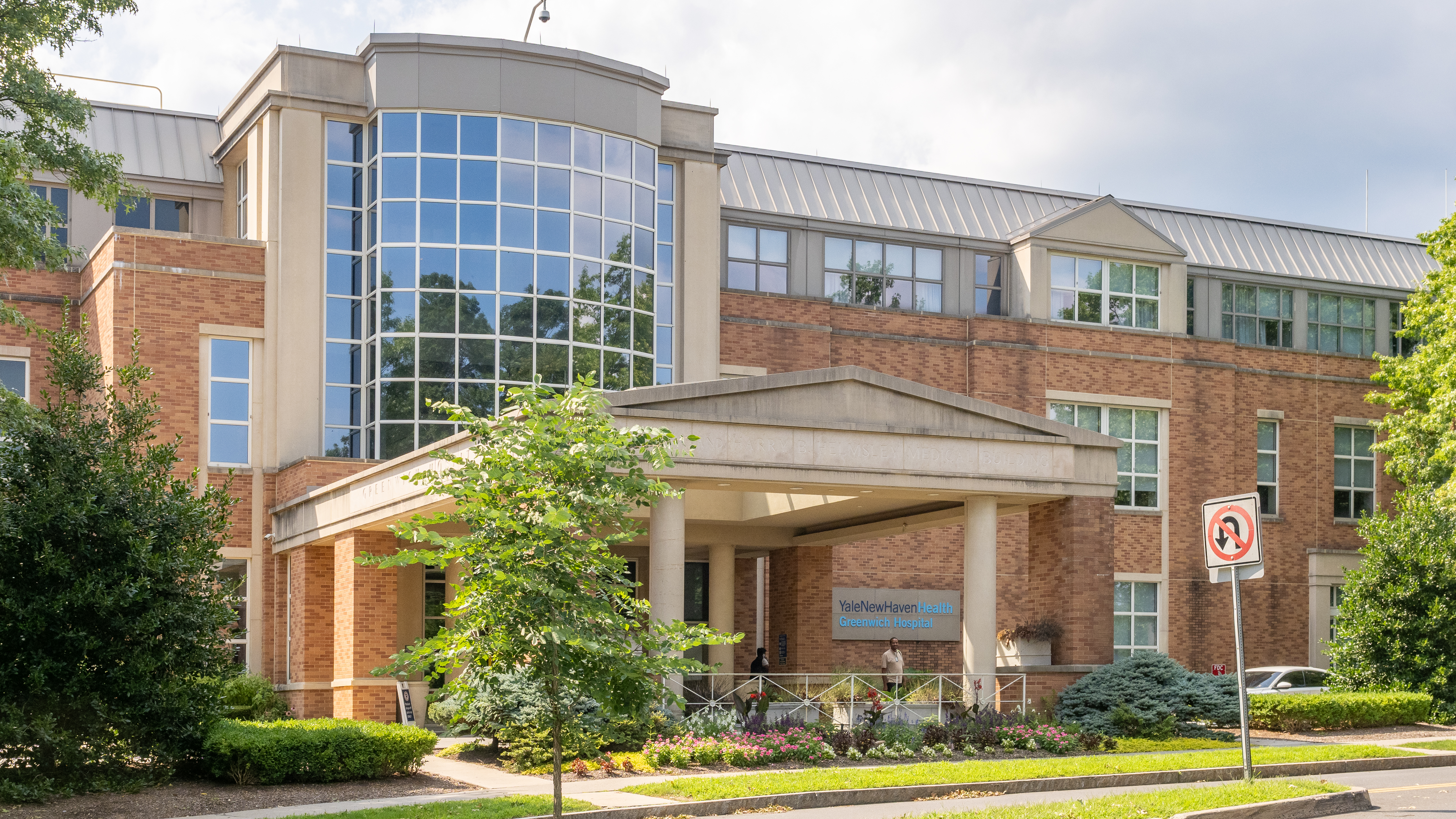

Geography
- Location: Greenwich, Connecticut, United States
- Coordinates: 41°02′06″N 73°37′51″W

Organization
- Affiliated university: Yale University School of Medicine

Services
- Emergency department: Level III trauma center
- Beds: 206

History
- Founded: 1903

Links
- Website: www.greenwichhospital.org
- Lists: Hospitals in Connecticut

Greenwich Hospital is a teaching hospital in Greenwich, Connecticut, serving people in lower Fairfield County and lower Westchester County, New York.

A member of Yale New Haven Health System, Greenwich Hospital is a teaching institution. It has an internal medicine residency program and is a major academic affiliate of Yale School of Medicine. The hospital is also affiliated with New York Medical College School of Medicine, Columbia University School of Social Work, Fairfield University School of Nursing and Graduate School of Education, Norwalk Community College, Pace University, and Westchester Community College Respiratory Therapy, among others.

In its 2020 fiscal year, the hospital reported 12,737 inpatient and 253,779 outpatient discharges. During the same period, the hospital emergency department had 32,534 visits.

Greenwich Hospital has sub-specialties that include geriatrics, oncology, orthopedics, obstetrics, pediatrics, ophthalmology and home care.

The hospital is located on a campus on Perryridge Road, northwest of downtown Greenwich.

The main campus encompasses the Helmsley Medical Building and the Thomas and Olive C. Watson Pavilion. Located across the street from the hospital at 77 Lafayette Place, the Sherman and Gloria H. Cohen Pavilion houses the Smilow Cancer Hospital Greenwich Hospital Campus, home to the Bendheim Cancer Center and the Breast Center. Greenwich Hospital also has an Endoscopy Center at 500 W. Putnam Avenue, the Greenwich Fertility Center, Helmsley Ambulatory Surgery Center, and the Weight Loss & Diabetes Center at 55 Holly Hill Lane, a facility for diagnostic imaging and physical therapy at 2015 W. Main Street in Stamford, Conn., as well as multiple satellite blood draw stations.

Greenwich Hospital is licensed as an acute care facility by the Connecticut Department of Public Health & Addiction Services. In 2017, it opened the Steven and Betsy Coman Palliative Care Center.

The hospital has 777 medical staff and 1,790 employees overall. Robert Blenderman is president of Greenwich Hospital.

== History ==
After being chartered in 1903, the hospital began service on September 12, 1906, in the Octagon House on Milbank Avenue, with four attending physicians, ten consulting doctors, two registered nurses, and seven student nurses. At that time the hospital had 24 beds.

In 1914 Commodore Elias C. Benedict, a town resident, offered partial financing to erect a new hospital building on Perryridge Road. The first building was regarded by many as inadequate. One of the people influential in suggesting the gift to Benedict was Luke Vincent Lockwood, Benedict's lawyer and a close friend of hospital founder Dr. Fritz Carleton Hyde. Initially, there was public resistance to the proposed building, with some saying it was too large for the community. World War I delayed construction, although in October 1917, the new facility opened in time to be used in the serious influenza epidemic that occurred the following year.

Because of growing demand for hospital services a new building on 5 Perryridge Road was opened on May 5, 1951. Over the years new wings were added to that building, with the last addition being the South Wing in 1965.

Again the hospital outgrew its building, and a campaign was started to finance a new building. Groundbreaking took place in 1997, and in 1999 the new hospital building opened.

In 1998, Greenwich Hospital affiliated itself with Yale New Haven Health System.

In 2013, the Greenwich Hospital Campus of Yale New Haven's Smilow Cancer Hospital opened, a collaboration between oncologists and specialists from Greenwich Hospital and Yale Cancer Center specialists in the Bendheim Cancer Center's facilities. As of July 2025, Greenwich Hospital is slated to spend $94 million constructing a new cancer treatment center within the main hospital building.

== Pictures ==
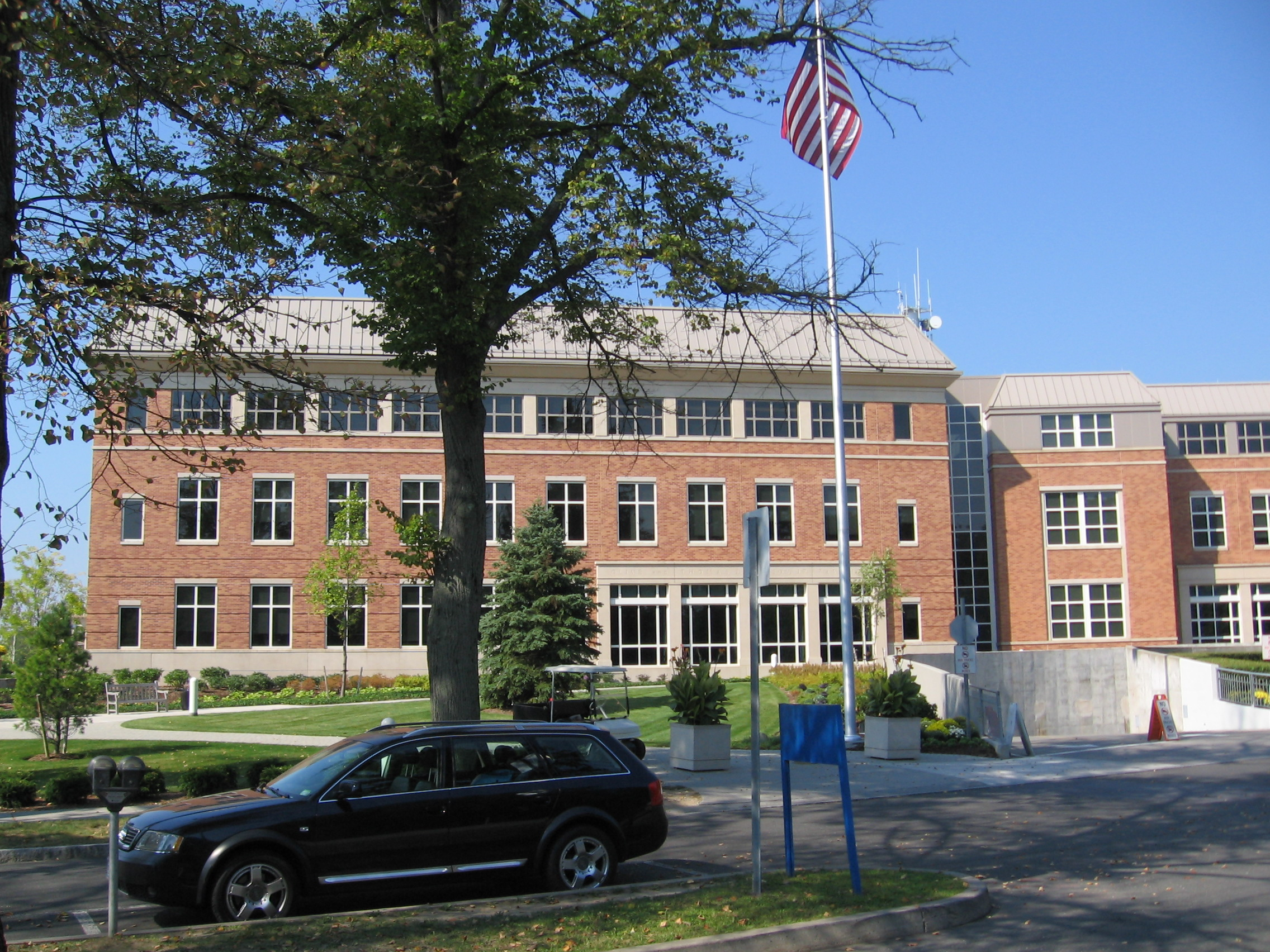
Olive and Thomas J. Watson Jr. Pavilion

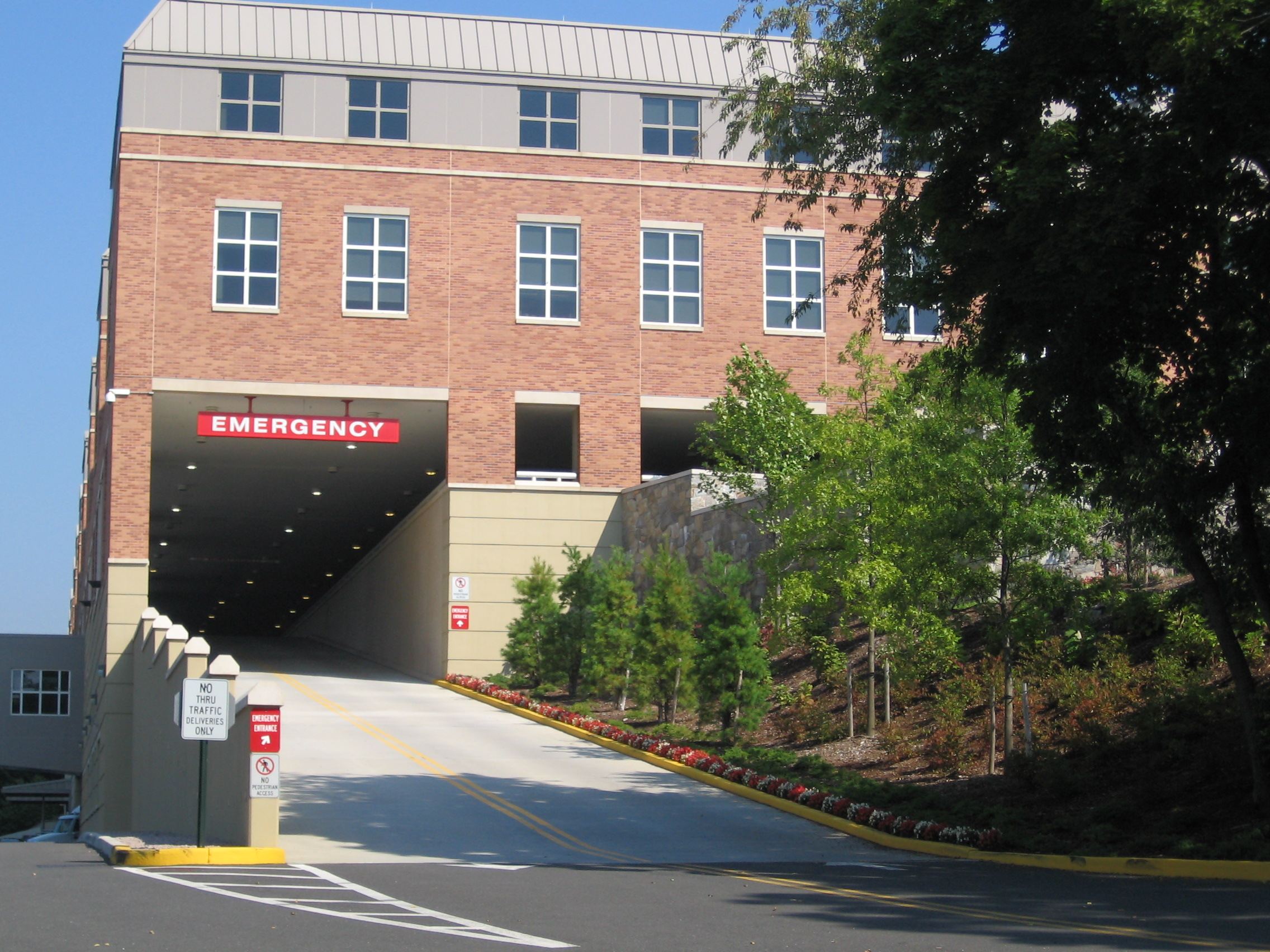
Flower-lined emergency entrance on Lake Avenue

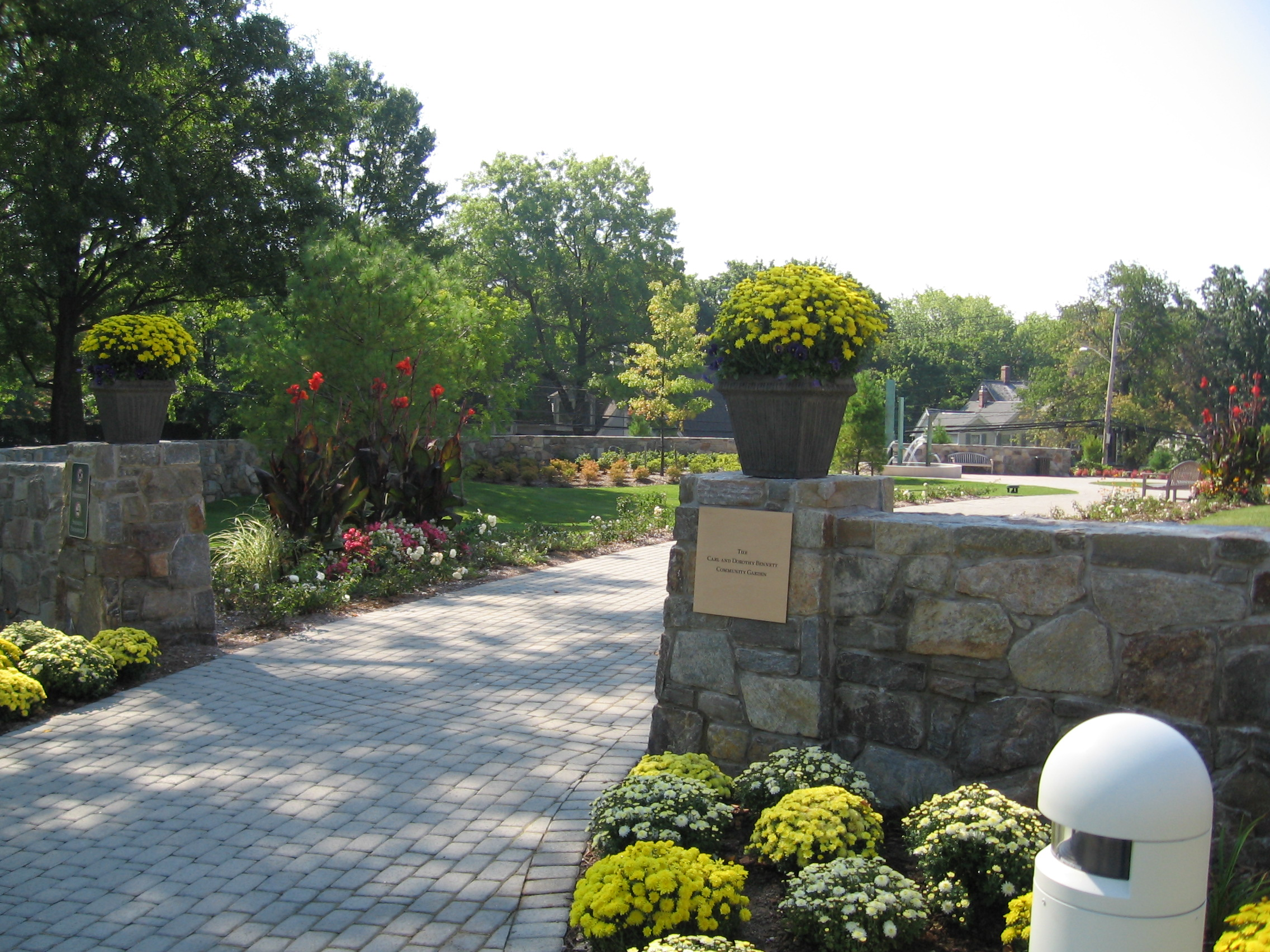
Carl and Dorothy Bennett Community Garden entrance

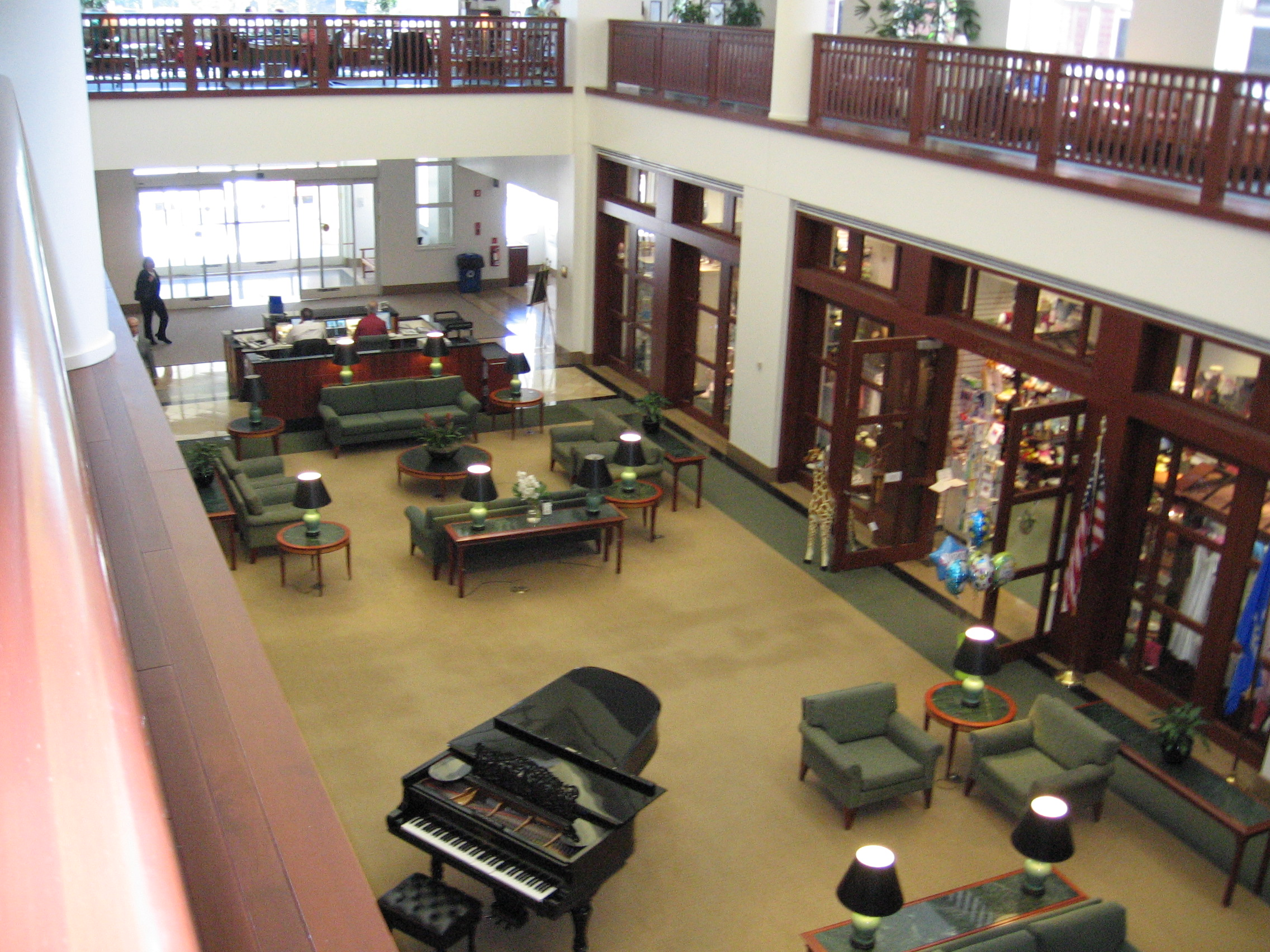
Front of the entrance lobby

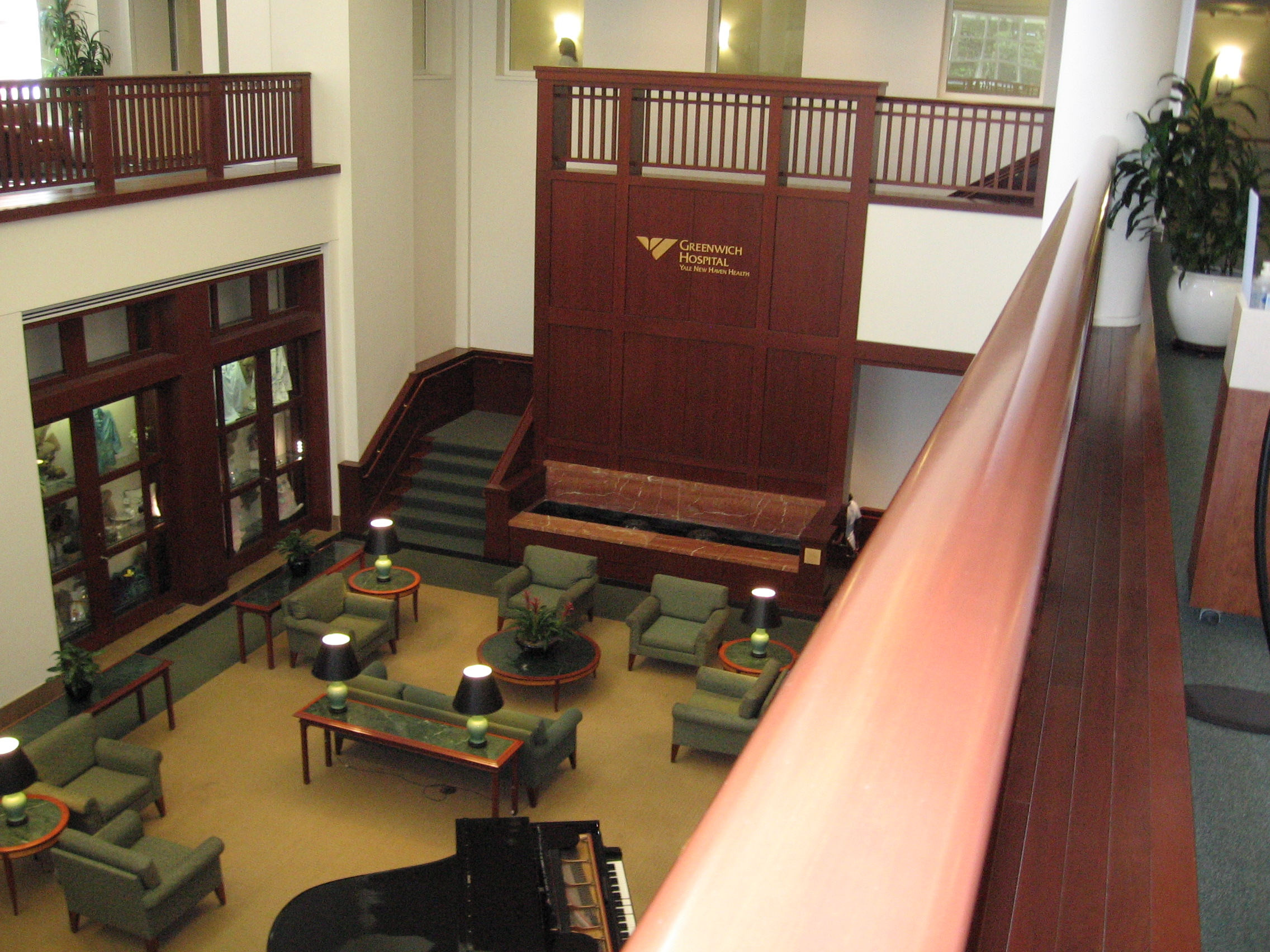
Back of the entrance lobby

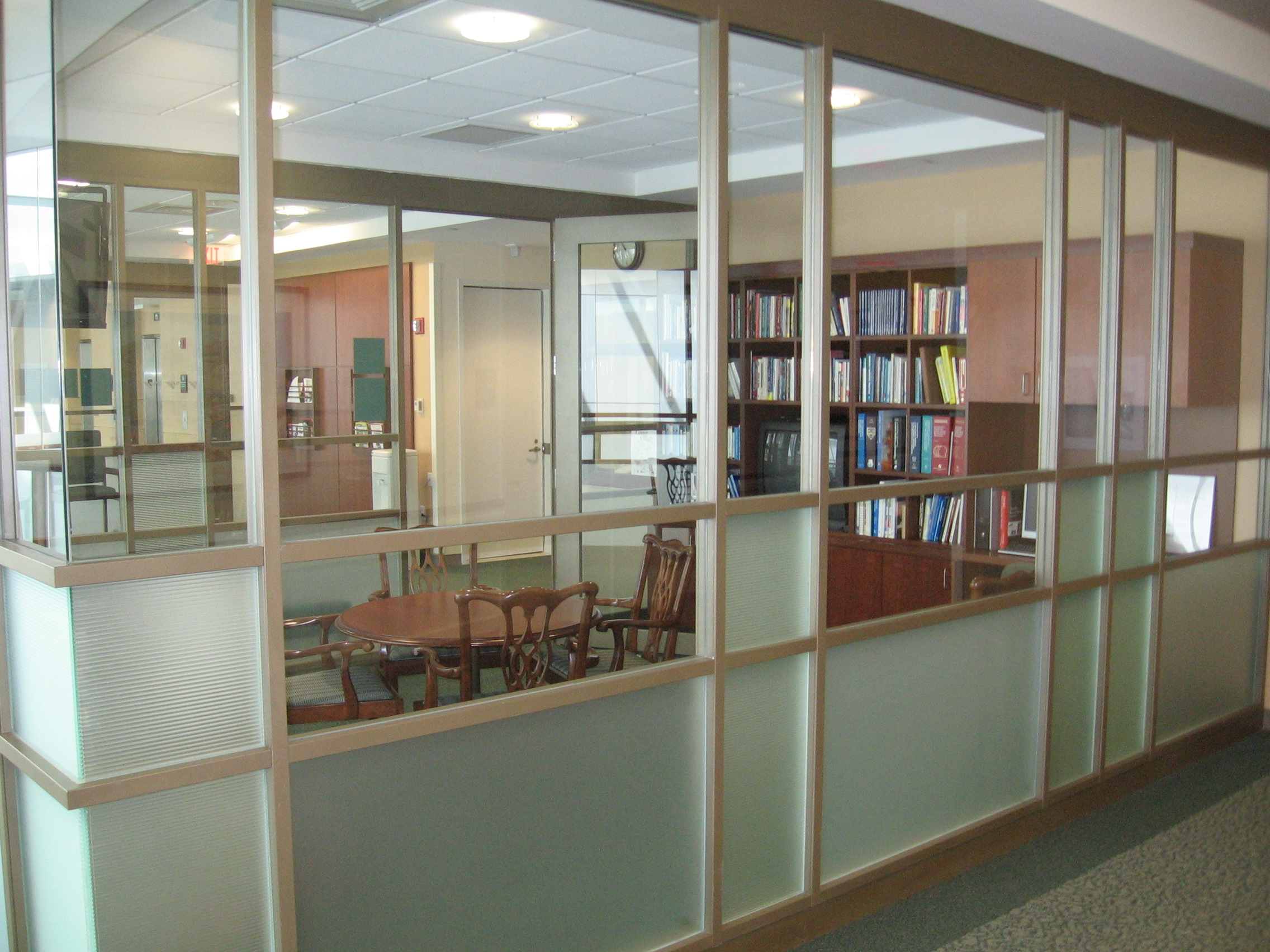
Center for Healthy Aging reading room

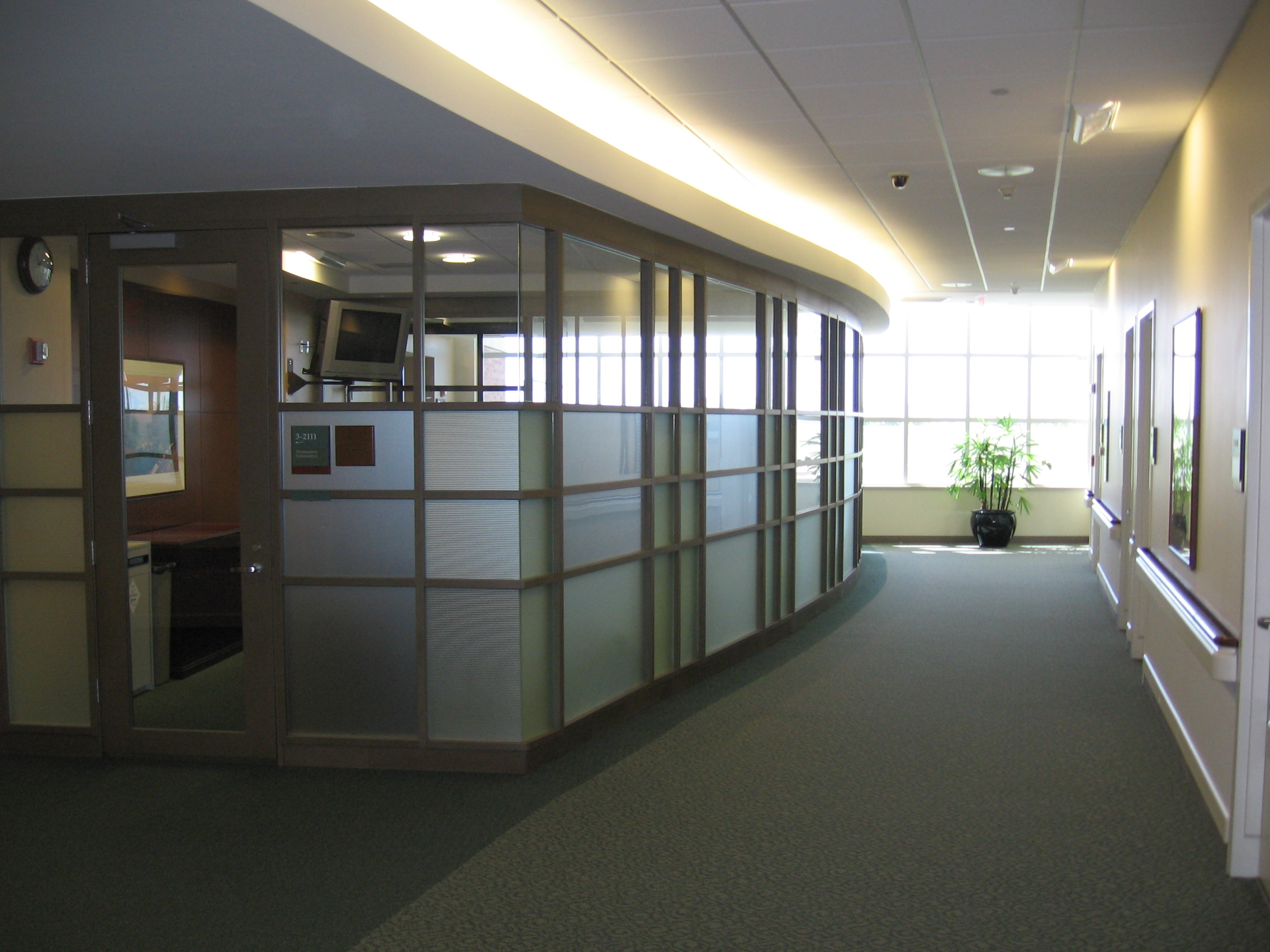
Third-floor corridor and conference room

== See also ==
- Another, older and larger Greenwich Hospital is in London, England.
- Lists of hospitals in the United States
- List of hospitals in Connecticut
- A 1906 postcard view of nearby Lafayette Place
