= Yale New Haven Children's Hospital =

- Yale New Haven Health System

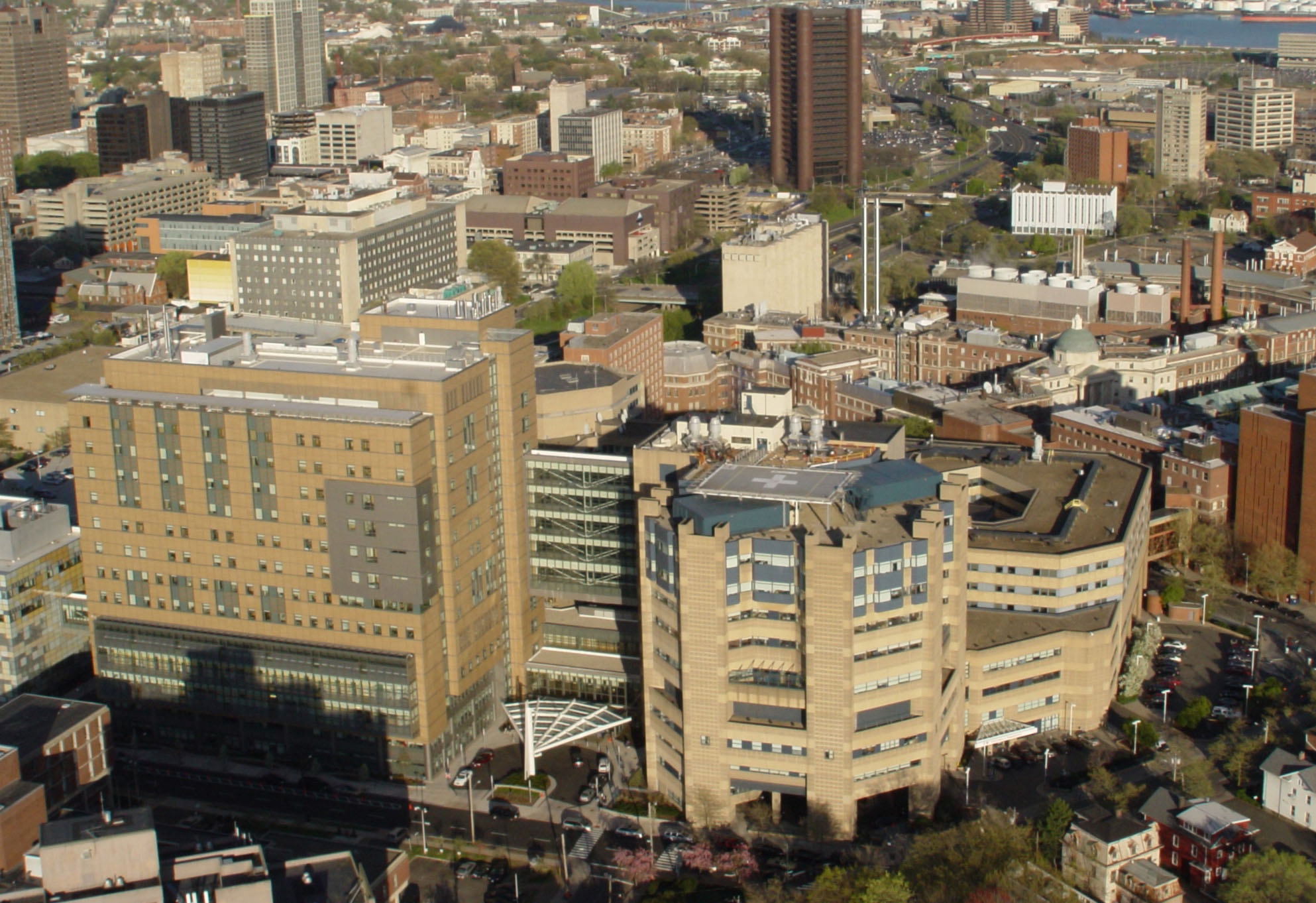
- YNH Children's Hospital is located in the lower right corner.

Geography
- Location: 1 Park Street, New Haven, CT, CT, United States
- Coordinates: 41.304354°N 72.936647°W

Organization
- Type: Teaching hospital
- Affiliated university: Yale School of Medicine

Services
- Emergency department: Level I Pediatric Trauma Center
- Beds: 202

Helipads
- Helipad: FAA LID: 1CT2
Number	Length		Surface
Number	ft	m	Surface
H1	48 x 72	15 × 22	asphalt

History
- Constructed: 1991
- Opened: 1993

Links
- Website: https://www.ynhh.org/childrens-hospital
- Lists: Hospitals in the United States

Yale New Haven Children's Hospital (YNHCH) is a 202-bed pediatric acute care children's hospital located in New Haven, Connecticut. The hospital is affiliated with the Yale School of Medicine. The hospital provides comprehensive pediatric care to infants, children, teens, and young adults aged 0 to 21 in Connecticut and throughout New England. Yale New Haven Children's Hospital also features a Level I Pediatric Trauma Center, one of two in the state.

As of 2026, U.S. News & World Report ranks YNHCH in seven pediatric specialties: diabetes and endocrinology (#19); neonatology (#37); nephrology (#46); gastroenterology and GI surgery (#26); pulmonology and lung surgery (#50); orthopedics (#34); pediatric & adolescent behavioral health (top 50). The hospital is also the top-ranked children's hospital in Connecticut and the second-ranked children's hospital in New England.

== History ==
Before the current building, care of pediatric patients took place on a pediatric unit in the main hospital, which had opened one of the first neonatal intensive care units in the country. Initial plans for the new building were drawn up in 1987. Hospital officials cited the lack of space for ambulatory programs as the main reason for the new freestanding children's hospital. The hospital opened up six years later in 1993.

In 2016 officials from Yale New Haven Health announced that they were in preliminary talks with Connecticut Children's Medical Center to merge and form an independent children's hospital system. The plan called for a formation of a board that managed both hospitals with the alliance named Kidco.

In September 2017, talks of merger ended when a disagreement over what system the new hospital would be in, with YNHCH wanting the system to be a part of Yale, and Connecticut Children's wanting the system to be completely independent.

In October 2017, YNHCH agreed to have its physicians provide pediatric emergency coverage at Greenwich Hospital in a dedicated pediatric emergency department.

In 2018, the hospital opened up a new two-floor neonatal intensive care unit that covers the entire tenth and eleventh floors. The new NICU debuted couplet rooms for mother and baby patients, a feature that is only in one other hospital nationwide. The new NICU has been seen as a model for other hospitals in the country. Later that year, in 2018, the unit was rated as a Level IV NICU (highest possible) by the American Academy of Pediatrics.

In 2018, as a part of the NICU renovation, the hospital also renovated four other floors of the hospital. Patient rooms and nurse stations were redesigned to better fit the needs of staff and patients.

In November 2019, YNHCH opened a 8,700-square-foot specialty center at Greenwich Hospital, expanding their pediatric offerings at the hospital adding child-friendly decor.

In October 2020, Yale New Haven Health opened a new $37 million pediatric and adult primary care clinic in the Fair Haven neighborhood of New Haven. Pediatric patients are managed by YNHCH.

In November 2020, the hospital took delivery of a neonatal MRI scanner, becoming only the second hospital in the country to own a neonatal MRI (after Brigham and Women's Hospital).

== About ==
=== Patient care units ===
In 1985, the hospital opened up the first inpatient child and adolescent psychiatric unit in the region. The hospital also has a 19-bed pediatric intensive care unit to treat critically ill infants, children, teens, and young adults.

=== Services ===
The hospital hosts a wide range of pediatric specialties and subspecialties and also hosts the labor and delivery unit for the entire hospital.

- Adolescent Psychiatric Care
- Ear, Nose, and Throat
- Pediatric Gynecology
- Toxicology
- Anesthesiology
- Emergency Services
- Pediatric Ophthalmology
- Transplantation
- Children's Psychiatric Care
- Fetal Care Center
- Radiology
- Trauma and Burn
- Craniofacial Center
- Genetics
- Rehabilitation Services
- Urology
- Critical Care
- Infectious Diseases
- Rheumatology

- Dentistry
- Kidney Disease
- Sleep Medicine

- Developmental and Behavioral Medicine
- Pediatric Cardiac Surgery
- Surgery

=== Awards ===
In 2017 the hospital was named the "overall winner" of the Children's Hospital Association's Pediatric Quality Award. Also in 2017, the hospital was ranked as #4 in the country for pediatric endocrinology by the U.S. News & World Report.

In 2018, YNHCH was named to the Parents Magazine list of the "20 most innovative children’s hospitals in the United States."

In September, 2020 the hospital's allergy and immunology department was recognized as a "Food Allergy Research & Education: clinical care center of distinction."

2025-2026 U.S. News & World Report Rankings for Yale New Haven Children's Hospital
Specialty	Rank (In the U.S.)
Neonatology	#37
Pediatric Diabetes & Endocrinology	#19
Pediatric Gastroenterology & GI Surgery	#26
Pediatric & Adolescent Behavioral Heatlh	Top 50
Pediatric Nephrology	#46
Pediatric Orthopedics	#34
Pediatric Pulmonology & Lung Surgery	Top 50

== See also ==
- List of children's hospitals in the United States
- Yale New Haven Hospital
- Yale School of Medicine
- Neonatal intensive care unit
