= UConn Health =

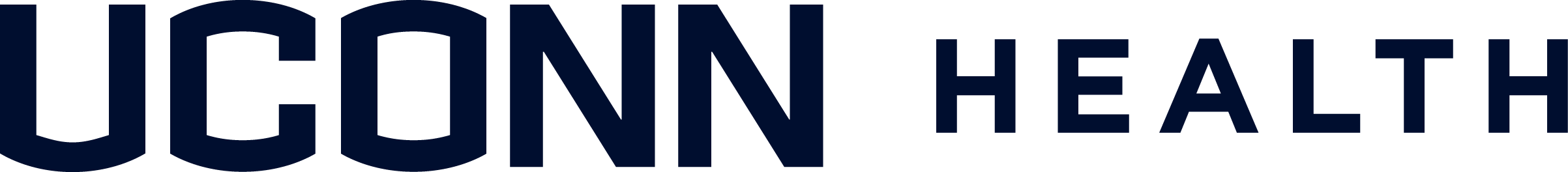

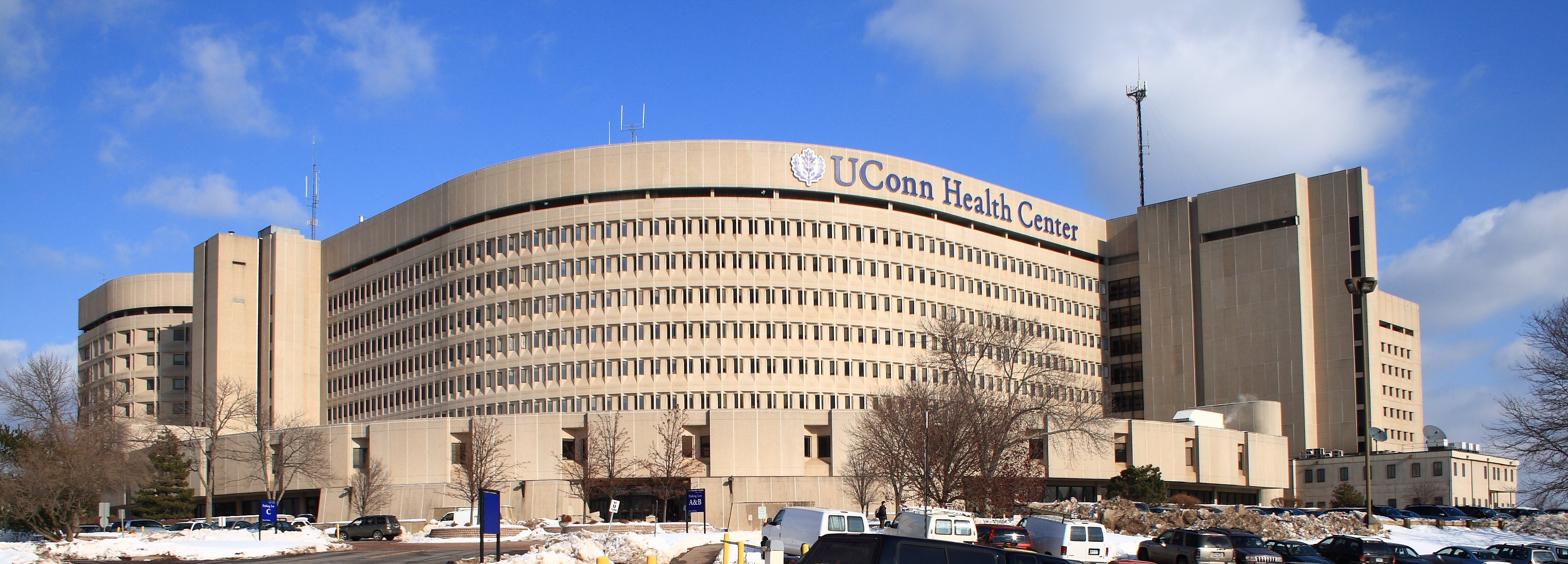
- UConn Health Center in Farmington

Geography
- Location: 263 Farmington Avenue, Farmington, Connecticut, United States
- Coordinates: 41.7315°N 72.7908°W

Organization
- Type: Teaching
- Affiliated university: University of Connecticut

Services
- Beds: 224

Helipads
- Helipad: FAA LID: CT75
Number	Length		Surface
Number	ft	m	Surface
H1	55	17	Concrete

History
- Former name: University of Connecticut Health Center
- Founded: 1961

Links
- Website: health.uconn.edu uconnhealth.org
- Lists: Hospitals in Connecticut

UConn Health is a healthcare system and hospital, and branch of the University of Connecticut that oversees clinical care, advanced biomedical research, and academic education in medicine. The system is funded directly by the State of Connecticut and the University’s financial endowment. Its primary location, UConn John Dempsey Hospital, is a teaching hospital located in Farmington, Connecticut, in the US. In total, UConn Health comprises the hospital, the UConn School of Medicine, School of Dental Medicine, and Graduate School. Additional community satellite locations are located in Avon, Canton, East Hartford, Putnam, Simsbury, Southington, Storrs, Torrington, West Hartford, and Willimantic, including two urgent cares in both Storrs and Canton. UConn Health also owns and operates many smaller clinics around the state that contain UConn Medical Group, UConn Health Partners, University Dentists and research facilities. Andrew Agwunobi stepped down as the CEO of UConn Health in February 2022 after serving since 2014 for a private-sector job. Bruce Liang was UConn Heath's interim CEO for 2022–2024 and remains dean of the UConn School of Medicine. Andrew Agwunobi returned to UConn Health as Executive Vice President of Health Affairs and CEO beginning May 31, 2024.

UConn Health has about 5,000 employees, and is closely linked with the University of Connecticut's main campus in Storrs through several cross-campus academic projects. Personnel are at the same time both University and Connecticut state employees. UConn Health is part of a plan introduced by Connecticut Governor Dannel P. Malloy, called "Bioscience Connecticut," and approved by the Connecticut General Assembly in 2011, to stimulate the economy in the state of Connecticut.

== Health Care Services ==
=== UConn John Dempsey Hospital ===
UConn John Dempsey Hospital is a 257 licensed bed university hospital and leading tertiary care facility that provides comprehensive clinical and surgical services including for emergency care, cardiac health, stroke recovery, geriatics, maternal fetal medicine, cardiology, cancer care, orthopaedics, dermatology and neurosurgery. The hospital is an acute care facility that operates the only full service emergency department in the Farmington Valley. UConn Health has an estimated annual impact of $3.3 billion on the local economy. The hospital was named after former Connecticut State Governor John N. Dempsey, after he successfully helped acquire funding for the academic hospital.

In the last year with available data, UConn Health had 8,653 admissions, 29,727 patients emergency room visits, and its surgeons performed 2,379 inpatient and 7,550 outpatient surgeries. UConn Health operates 68 medical residency training programs for physicians, as well as eight advanced dental training programs.

Bioscience Connecticut construction began in 2013. It included a new patient care tower on the UConn Health campus, as well as renovations to the existing UConn John Dempsey Hospital. The project was completed in 2016. The building is certified in Leadership in Energy and Environmental Design (LEED).

=== Outpatient care ===
With more than 450 physicians in more than 50 specialties, the physicians of the UConn Health form one of the region's largest multi-specialty practice. Outpatient services include primary care, OB/GYN, dermatology, neurosurgery and orthopedic surgery. UConn Health also partners with the UConn Department of Kinesiology to offer the Institute for Sports Medicine, whose doctors serve as both health care for the general public and as team physicians and athletic trainers for both UConn and Woodstock Academy, a local high school. The UConn Center on Aging offers specialized services to aging populations. Clinic sites are located on the Farmington campus, and at satellite offices in West Hartford, East Hartford, Avon, Simsbury and Southington.

Through Bioscience Connecticut, a new ambulatory care center began construction in 2012 on the UConn Health campus, part of a $840 million state initiative. The 300,000-square-foot outpatient ambulatory care center was supported with $203 million in private financing, and will house existing services and support the work of new faculty that will be joining the UConn Health.

=== Dental care ===
University Dentists, the group practice based on the Health Center's Farmington campus, provides preventive, corrective and restorative care for patients of all ages. In addition, the student and resident run dental services provide an affordable safety net for patients with little or no insurance.

UConn Health is home to a modern Center for Implant and Reconstructive Dentistry that offers dental implant therapies and is engaged in research into bone growth and augmentation.

=== Correctional Managed Health Care (CMHC) ===
UConn Heath's former Correctional Managed Health Care (CMHC) program, a prior longtime partnership with the Department of Correction, transitioned back to the DOC in 2018. The DOC now delivers comprehensive managed health care to State of Connecticut inmates. Medical, mental health, dental and ancillary services are provided by the DOC in all 14 facilities across the state.

== Education ==
UConn Health, comprising the Graduate School, School of Medicine, and School of Dental Medicine, is situated on 150 acres of wooded hilltop.

The UConn School of Medicine offers programs including M.D. Program, M.D./Ph.D. Program, M.D./M.P.H. Program, M.D./ M.S.C.T.R. Program, and Special Program in Medicine. The MD program is accredited by the Liaison Committee on Medical Education. Through various residency and fellowship programs, the School of Medicine provides postgraduate training to over 700 MD and DO physicians each year. Training occurs at UConn Health's main campus, as well as community hospitals, such as Hartford Hospital and St. Francis Hospital and The Hospital of Central Connecticut. Through 2024, the UConn School of Medicine has graduated 53 classes and 4,184 medical school students. The current dean of the UConn School of Medicine is Bruce T. Liang.

The UConn School of Dental Medicine offers degree in dentistry (DMD). They also offer other clinical certificate and graduate degree programs such as joint D.M.D. and Ph.D. degrees and Master of dental science. The current dean of the UConn School of Dental Medicine is Steven Lepowsky, who was appointed in 2020. The dental school is accredited by the American Dental Association.

The Graduate School student body consists of students from diverse backgrounds and cultures. The Graduate School at UConn Health offers programs in four fields of study – Biomedical Science, Public Health, Clinical and Translational Research, and Dental Science. The Graduate School at Uconn Health offers degree programs such as Ph.D. in Biomedical Science, Ph.D. in Public Health, Master of Public Health, Master of Dental Science, Master of Science Program in Clinical and Translational Research. On average there are approximately 150 Ph.D. students, 35 Master of Dental Science students and 120 Master of Public Health students.

UConn Health also sponsors residency and fellowship programs that provide specialty training for newly graduated physicians, and continuing education programs for practicing health care professionals. The institution is home to about 450 students working toward their medical doctor's degree (MD), 160 toward their doctor of medical dentistry degree (DMD), and 340 towards their doctoral degree (PhD).

As the dental and medical schools took shape during the 1960s, their planners took advantage of their simultaneous evolution to forge links between them. Most notably, medical and dental students share an essentially common curriculum during the first two years of their four-year degree programs. During this period they study the basic medical sciences together. This experience provides UConn's dental students with a foundation in the biomedical sciences that undergird the dental profession. UConn Health graduated its first students in 1972.

=== Urban Service Track ===
Urban Service Track is a program that is based at University of Connecticut Health Center. It is designed to produce a cadre of well qualified health care professionals committed to serving Connecticut's urban underserved populations. As Urban Health Scholars, participants come from a select group of students enrolled in the University of Connecticut School of Dental Medicine, Pharmacy, Nursing, Medicine, Social Work, and Quinnipiac University's Physician Assistant Program. A total of 50 to 52 Urban Health Scholars, eight to ten students per school, are selected each year from among qualified applicants who have a demonstrated commitment to service. Urban Health Scholars gain valuable exposure to the complex and challenging issues of health care in the inner city.

In UST's 2007 pilot program, 24 students enrolled from the four health professions, attending three Learning Retreats and providing service at four community health centers. As of 2013, about 191 students have enrolled in the program.

This program has an 11 competency curriculum. These are: culture and linguistic appreciation; population health; health policy; advocacy; health care financing and management; leadership and interprofessional teamwork; utilization of community resources; and quality improvement and patient safety. It has a formal 2 year curriculum which is delivered through quarterly Learning Retreats hosted in communities that UST serves. These four hour retreats bring Urban Health Scholars from the five disciplines together for focused training sessions that examine the competencies through the lenses of vulnerable populations. These include: urban children and youth; the incarcerated and ex-offender; the homeless; individuals living with HIV/AIDS; the developmentally disabled; refugee and immigrant populations; the elderly and children; substance abusers; and veterans.

== Research ==
UConn Health publishes research in neuroscience, molecular biology, molecular pharmacology, biochemistry, cell physiology, toxicology, and endocrinology, among other fields. The Alcohol Research Center at UConn Health is one of fourteen such federally supported centers in the nation; the Connecticut Clinical Chemosensory Research Center is one of five.

In 2010, the university established the Cell and Genome Sciences building, which includes its new Stem Cell Institute as well as cell biology and genetics research in its Center for Cell Analysis and Modeling and Department of Genetics and Developmental Biology.

UConn Health shares an academic partnership with the Jackson Laboratory, known as JAX Genomic Medicine since 2014.

== See also ==
- American Student Dental Association
