= Hartford Hospital =

Coordinates: 41.7547°N 72.6811°W

- Hartford Hospital (2026)

Geography
- Location: 80 Seymour Street Hartford, CT 06102, Hartford, Connecticut, United States

Organization
- Type: Teaching
- Affiliated university: UConn Health Center
- Network: Hartford HealthCare

Services
- Emergency department: Level I trauma center
- Beds: 867

Helipads
- Helipad: FAA LID: 0CT9
Number	Length		Surface
Number	ft	m	Surface
H1	60x75	18x23	Concrete

History
- Founded: 1854

Links
- Website: hartfordhospital.org
- Lists: Hospitals in Connecticut

Hartford Hospital is an 867-bed acute care teaching hospital located in the South End of Hartford, Connecticut. Hartford Hospital was established in 1854. The hospital campus is located on Seymour Street in Hartford and is directly adjacent to the main campus of the Connecticut Children's Medical Center. Hartford Hospital was ranked #2 in Connecticut by U.S. News Best Hospitals and ranked #1 in the Hartford, Connecticut metro region by the same source. The hospital is a major tertiary care facility for the statewide region and is state designated as a Level I Trauma Center, able to care for the most critically injured of patients. It has 45 operating rooms. The emergency room receives over 100,000 visits per year.

== History ==
The hospital was formed in 1854 after the State of Connecticut granted a charter for the Formation of Hartford Hospital following a boiler explosion and resulting fire at the Fales and Grey Car Works resulting in 19 deaths and 23 people seriously injured.

16 people were killed in a fire in 1961 that started as a result of a cigarette butt being dropped down a rubbish chute.

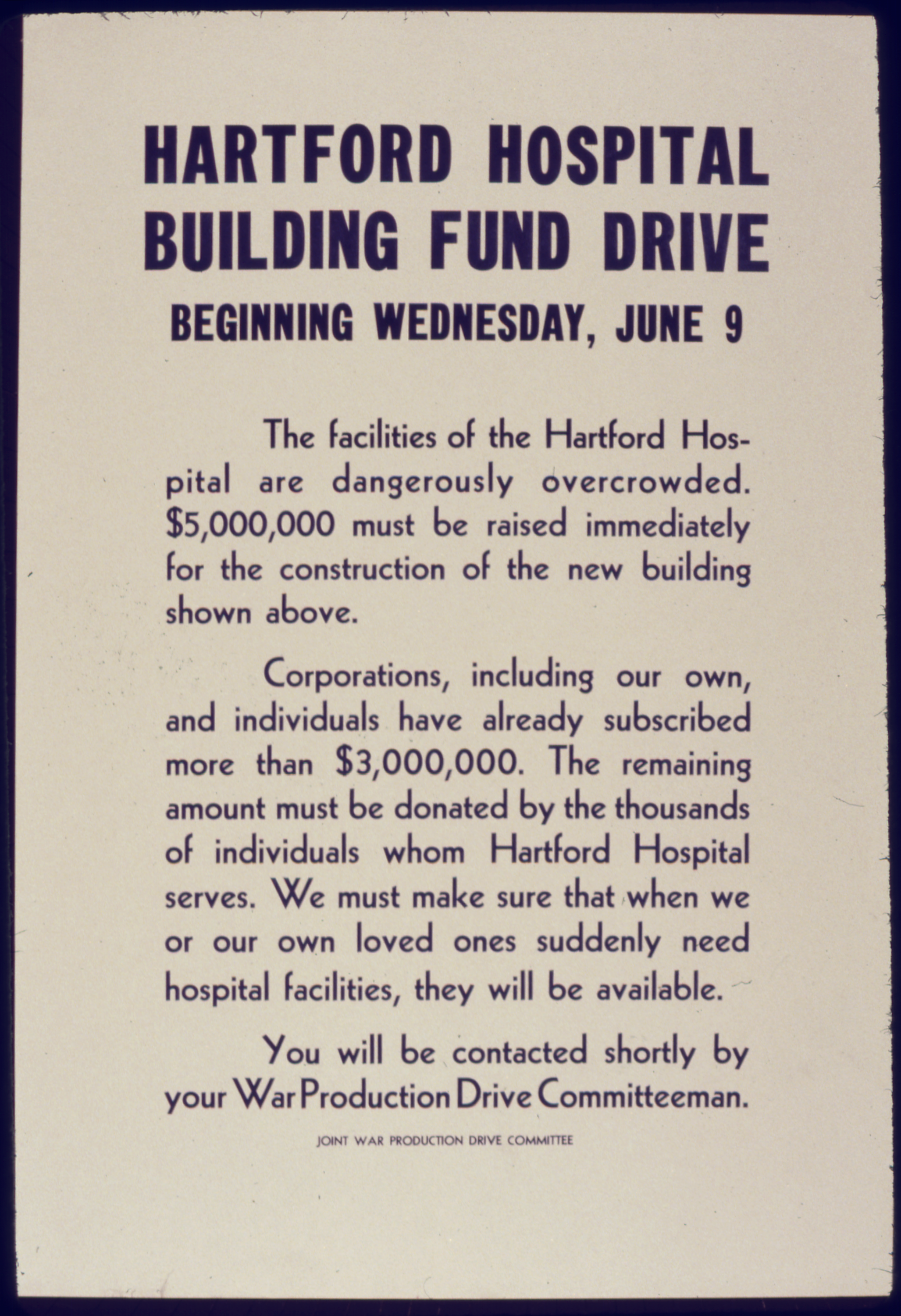
Fundraising drive for Hartford Hospital in WWII

=== Jefferson House history ===
Originally located at 36 Jefferson Street in Hartford, the Old People's Home of Hartford offered the "elderly an alternative to the county poorhouse." The Connecticut Legislature authorized the facility by a Special Act in 1873 and opened its doors in December 1, 1884.

Connecticut public documents described the home:

PRIVATE PROVISION FOR THE AGED
THE OLD PEOPLE'S HOME HARTFORD
LA Sexton MD Superintendent

The Old People's Home is under the same management as the Hartford Hospital and was organized by an act of the General Assembly in 1873. An attractive three storied building of brick and stone was erected for the use of the Home on Jefferson Street opposite the Hospital grounds, and has accommodations for seventy persons. The rooms are large and well furnished and everything is provided which will insure to the occupants the comforts of a well-appointed home. Religious services are held every Sunday afternoon from October to July in an attractive and convenient chapel at the west end of the building.

Residents in the Home must be citizens of Connecticut persons of good character not under sixty five years of age and in reduced circumstances. For several years applicants for admission have exceeded so greatly the means of the Home to support them that it has been necssary [sic] to make the entrance fee $1,000 for permanent inmates. A few boarders are received at $7.00 per week and the Home is well filled at all times.

The name was changed to Jefferson House in 1953. The home cared for and honored its commitment under the old life-care concept until 1979 when the last original resident died. It cared for 662 patients from 1884 to 1979.

A new facility was constructed and opened in Newington, Connecticut in 1980, as a short-term rehabilitation facility.

== Services ==
=== Helicopter ambulance ===
Hartford Hospital operates Connecticut's first (and for nearly 30 years it was the state's only) air ambulance service, LIFE STAR, which began operation in 1985 and operates one American Eurocopter BK-117 helicopter and one American Eurocopter EC-145. One helicopter is based at MidState Medical Center in Meriden, CT, and another is based at affiliated Backus Hospital in Norwich, Connecticut. LIFE STAR operates a third helicopter, an American Eurocopter EC-135, also 24 hours a day, seven days per week and is based out of Westfield Barnes Airport in Westfield MA. LIFE STAR provides patient care and inter-facility transport between hospitals in New England and New York. In addition, LIFE STAR provides advanced life support scene response and transport for the most critically injured and medically unstable patients in Connecticut. These patients are taken to a Level I or Level II trauma center across the state according to state regulations. The program averages 1,400 patient transports per year and plays a vital role in providing speedy access to trauma care for patients in outlying, rural areas.

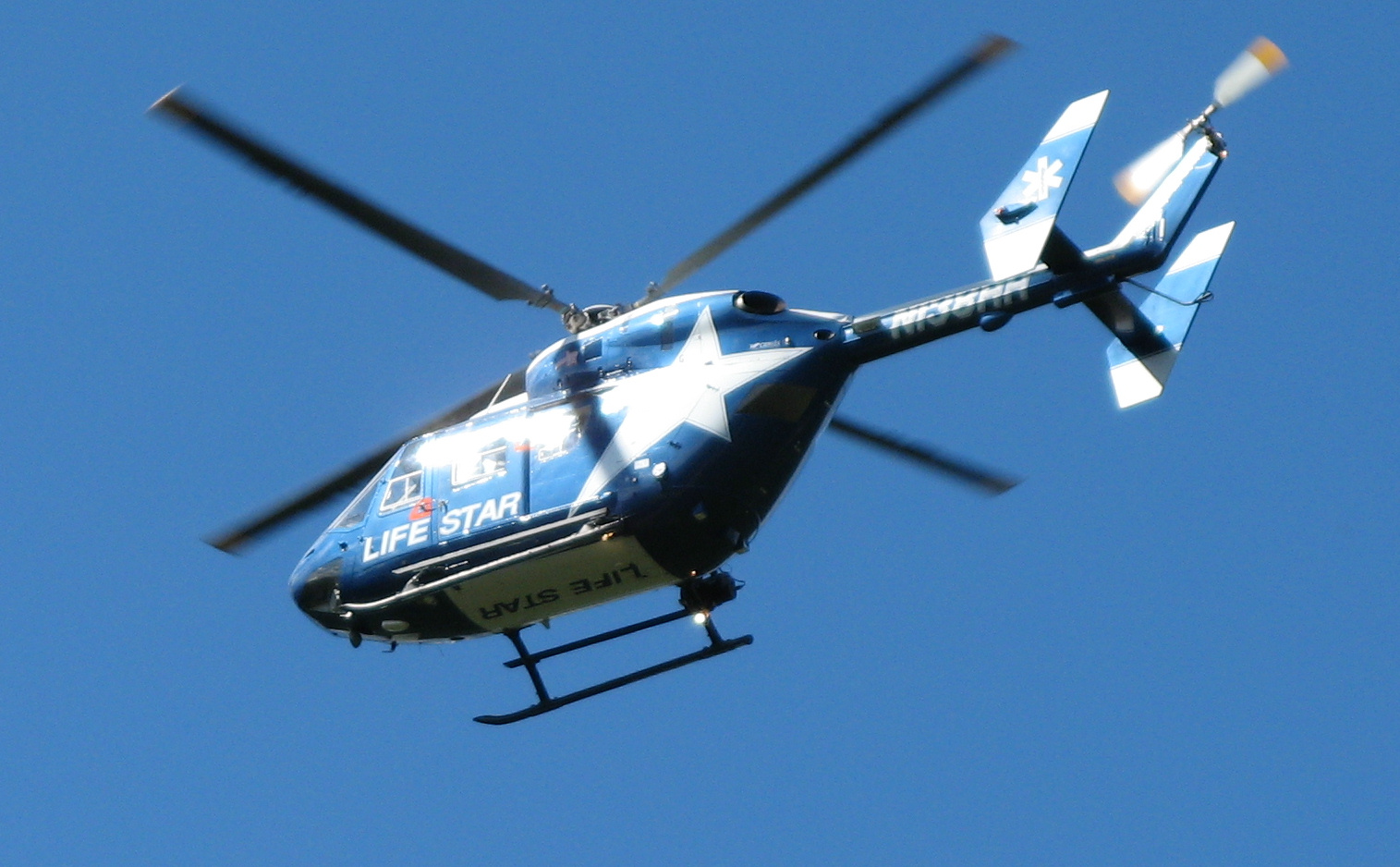
LifeStar taking off from the scene of a car accident in Glastonbury, Connecticut

=== Hyperbaric chamber ===
Hartford Hospital operates the second largest multi-place hyperbaric chamber in the Northeastern United States, second only to Phelps Memorial Hospital Center, in Sleepy Hollow, NY. Capable of treating up to ten patients at one time, this chamber treats both chronic wounds and emergencies, such as carbon monoxide poisoning and Necrotizing Fasciitis.

=== Jefferson House ===
Jefferson House is a department of Hartford Hospital that has provided long-term care and rehabilitation services to seniors in the greater Hartford area for more than 120 years. Jefferson House is 104-bed long-term care facility, and serves approximately 92 residents.

== Medical education ==
Hartford Hospital has trained physicians for over 160 years, through its residency and fellowship programs. A number of training programs are offered to newly graduated physicians (MD and DO), each of which is accredited by the Accreditation Council for Graduate Medical Education.

== Hospital rating data ==
The HealthGrades website contains the clinical quality data for Heart of the Hartford Hospital, as of 2021. For this rating section three different types of data from HealthGrades are presented: clinical quality ratings for thirty-one inpatient conditions and procedures, twelve patient safety indicators and the percentage of patients giving the hospital as a 9 or 10 (the two highest possible ratings).

For patient safety indicators, there are the same three possible ratings. For this hospital safety indicators were rated as:

- Worse than expected - 1
- As expected - 9
- Better than expected - 3

Percentage of patients who would definitely recommend this hospital - 76% Percentage of patients who on average rank are 70%

Percentage of patients rating this hospital as a 9 or 10 - 72% Percentage of patients who on average rank hospitals as a 9 or 10 - 69%

== See also ==
- Austin Cornelius Dunham
- List of hospitals in Connecticut
