= Saint Francis Hospital & Medical Center =

Hospital in Hartford, Connecticut, United States

- Trinity Health of New England

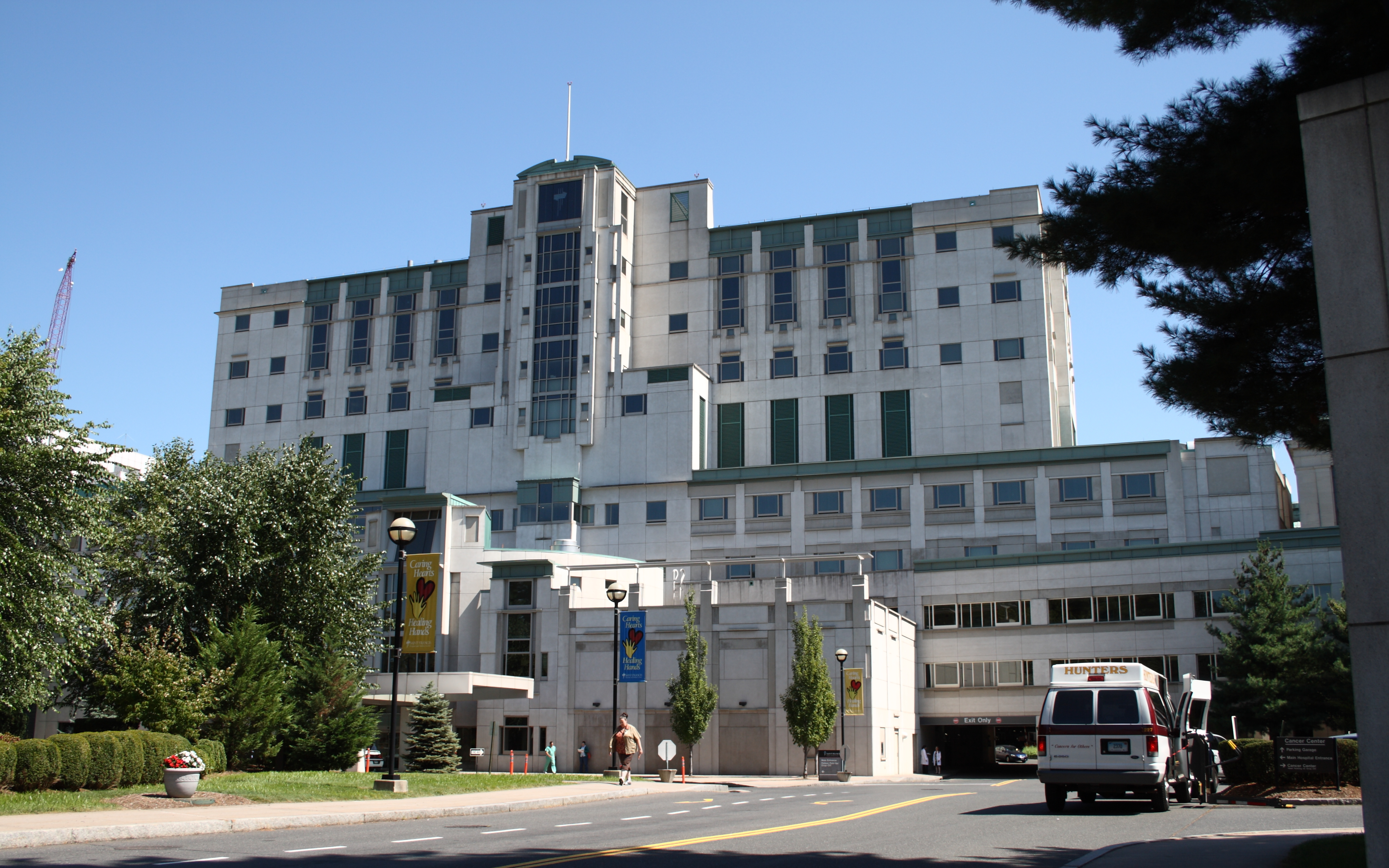

Geography
- Location: 114 Woodland Street, Hartford, Connecticut, United States
- Coordinates: 41.7764°N 72.6983°W

Organization
- Type: Teaching
- Affiliated university: Frank H. Netter MD School of Medicine at Quinnipiac University; University of Connecticut

Services
- Emergency department: Level 1 Trauma Center
- Beds: 617

Helipads
- Helipad: FAA LID: 0CT5
Number	Length		Surface
Number	ft	m	Surface
H1	46	14	Mats

History
- Founded: 1897

Links
- Website: www.trinityhealthofne.org/location/saint-francis-hospital
- Lists: Hospitals in Connecticut

Saint Francis Hospital & Medical Center is a 617-bed acute care hospital located on Woodland Street in Hartford, Connecticut. The hospital was established in 1897 by the Sisters of Saint Joseph of Chambéry. With 617 beds and 65 bassinets, it is the largest Catholic hospital in New England.

== History ==
Saint Francis has been affiliated with Mount Sinai Hospital since 1990. This was the first recorded instance of collaboration between a Catholic hospital and a Jewish hospital in the United States. The two institutions formalized the corporate merger in 1995. In addition, the hospital maintains affiliations with Saint Mary's Hospital, Waterbury, which is independently licensed. Saint Francis, a regional referral center, has major clinical concentrations in cardiology, oncology, orthopedics, women's services and rehabilitation.

In 2008, ground was broken on a ten-story addition, the John T. O'Connell Tower. Opened in March 2011, this addition included 19 replacement operating rooms, 72 replacement medical/surgical patient beds, and a Helipad on the roof of the building. It includes six orthopedic operating rooms and sixty-three replacement inpatient orthopedic beds for the Connecticut Joint Replacement Institute. Also featuring an enlarged emergency department, expanding the treatment area from forty-nine to sixty-eight treatment bays and increasing space for ambulances from six to ten parking spots.

In January 2012, Saint Francis Hospital and Medical Center received its second PureCell System's Model 400 phosphoric acid fuel cell, which will provide power to the Mount Sinai Rehabilitation Hospital campus. The 400 kW PureCell System will provide nearly half of the building's electrical needs as well as providing thermal energy; the installation prevents the release of more than 383 metric tons of carbon dioxide annually – the equivalent of planting more than 88 acres of trees, the hospital claims.

Trinity Health acquired St. Francis Care in 2014. Trinity merged St. Francis Care with Sisters of Providence Health System (parent of Mercy Medical Center in Springfield, Massachusetts) to form Trinity Health of New England in 2015.

In 2018, Saint Francis Hospital and Medical Center was verified by the American College of Surgeons as a Level I Trauma Center, the highest-level status for trauma care.

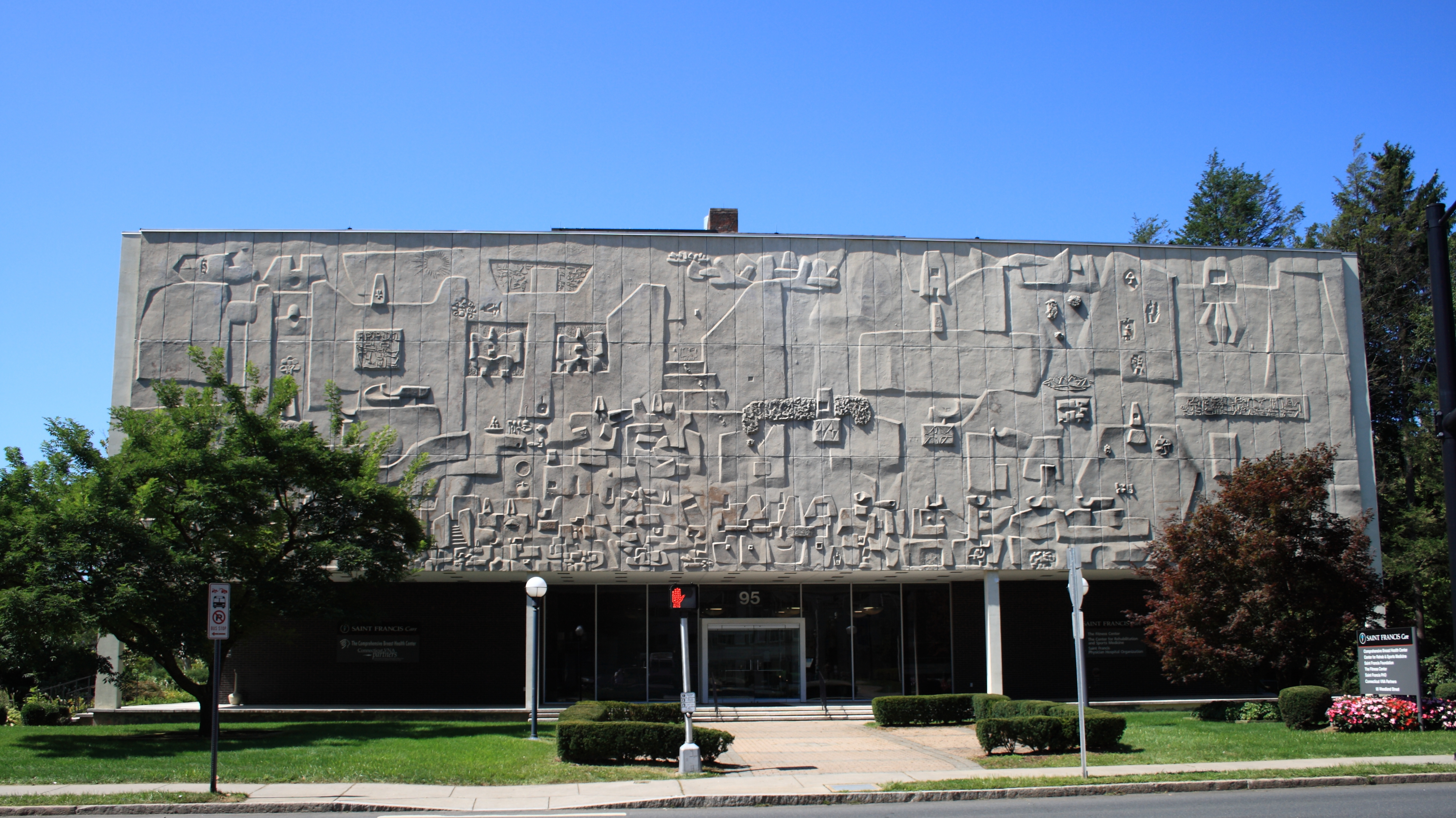
St. Francis Hospital, 95 Woodland Street

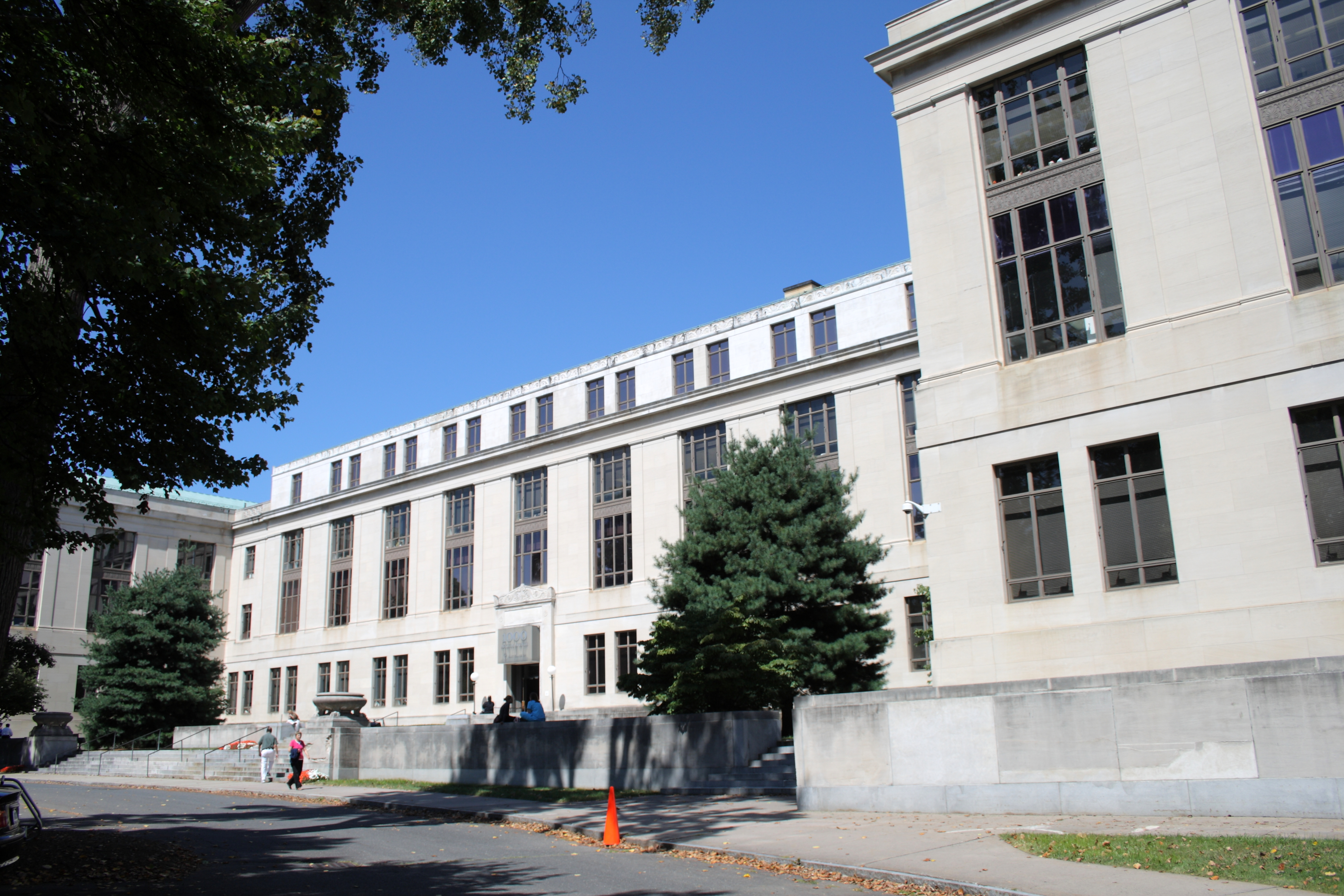
St. Francis Hospital, 1000 Asylum Avenue

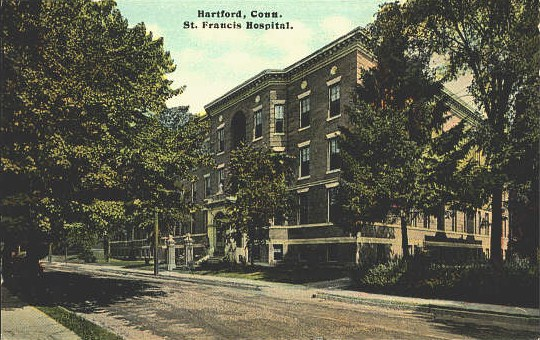
The hospital shown in a postcard from about 1915
