= Yale School of Medicine =

Private medical school in New Haven Connecticut, US

Coordinates: 41.3027°N 72.936°W

- Coat of arms of the school
- Type: Private medical school
- Established: 1810; 216 years ago
- Parent institution: Yale University
- Affiliations: Yale New Haven Hospital
- Dean: Nancy J. Brown
- Faculty: 5,485
- Students: 1,727
- Location: New Haven, Connecticut, US
- Website: medicine.yale.edu

The Yale School of Medicine is the medical school of Yale University, a private Ivy League research university in New Haven, Connecticut. It was founded in 1810 as the Medical Institution of Yale College and formally opened in 1813. It is the sixth-oldest medical school in the United States.

The school’s faculty clinical practice is Yale Medicine. Yale School of Medicine has a strong affiliation with its primary teaching hospital, Yale New Haven Hospital and the Yale New Haven Health System. The school is home to the Harvey Cushing/John Hay Whitney Medical Library, which is one of the country’s largest modern medical libraries and is known for its historical collections.

For the class of 2029, the school received 6,206 applications to fill 104 seats in the MD Program. The acceptance rate is about 4.4%. The median GPA for the class was 3.94, and the median MCAT score was 523.

== Education ==
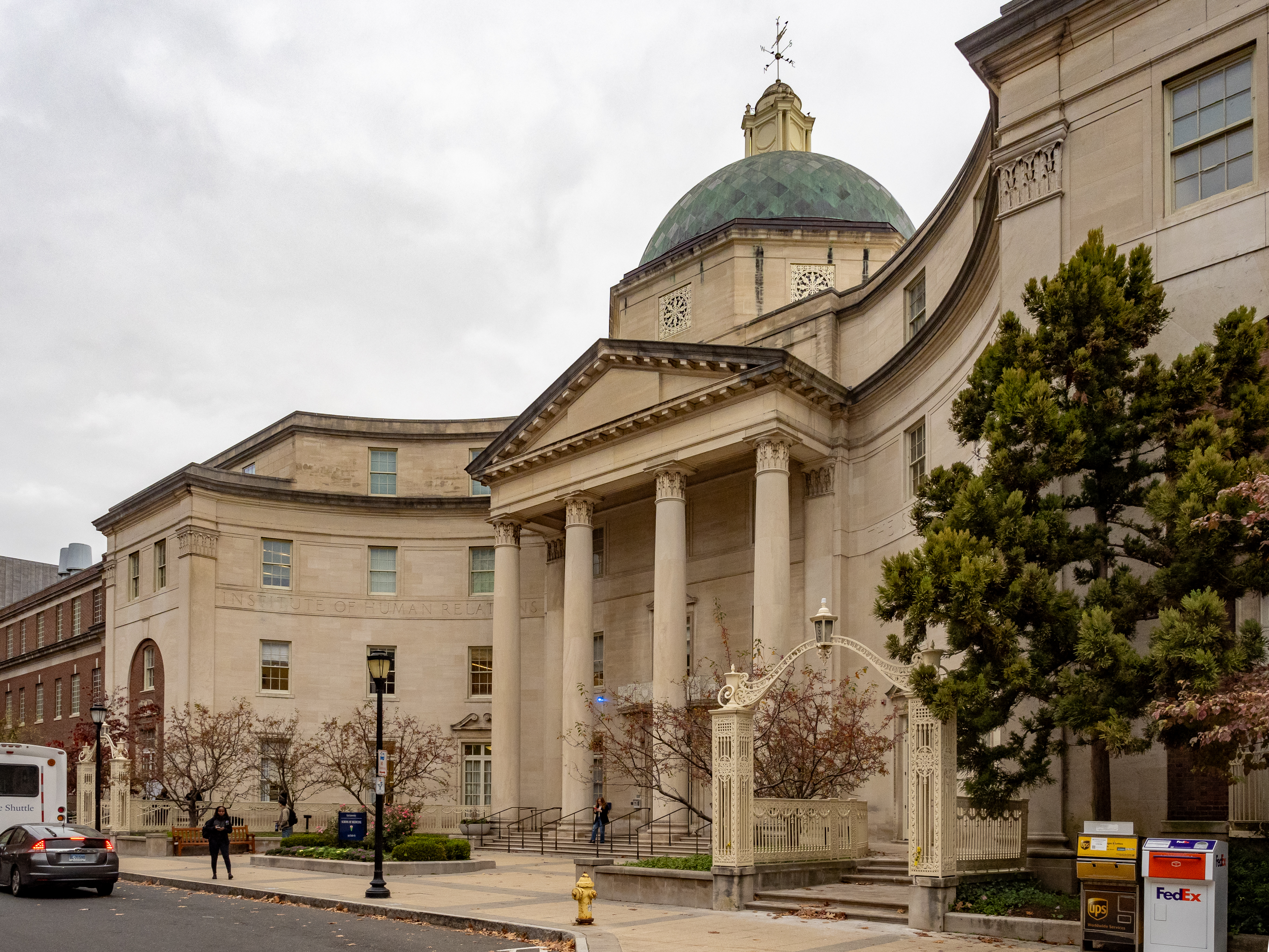
Sterling Hall of Medicine (2024)

Yale School of Medicine educates future leaders in medicine and biomedical science. Since 1839, medical students have written a thesis based on original research, reflecting that the scientific process of investigation, observation, interpretation of data, and critical evaluation of literature are fundamental to the practice of medicine.

Many medical students take a tuition-free fifth year to pursue additional study, conducting in-depth research or exploring clinical electives and sub-internships. A significant number are awarded fifth-year research fellowships and earn the Master of Health Science degree.

Each year, approximately 20 students enroll in the school’s MD-PhD Program, one of the original Medical Scientist Training Programs established and funded by the National Institutes of Health (NIH). Graduate students in the combined program in the Biomedical and Biological Sciences earn a PhD degree through the Faculty of Arts and Sciences. YSM residents, fellows, and faculty, as well as individuals from other institutions, can earn a two-year Master of Health Science degree. The Yale School of Medicine also offers joint degree programs with other professional schools, including Public Health, Law, Management, Engineering & Applied Science, and Divinity.

YSM’s campus-based Physician Associate (PA) Program, trains students to become patient-centered PAs.

=== Yale System ===
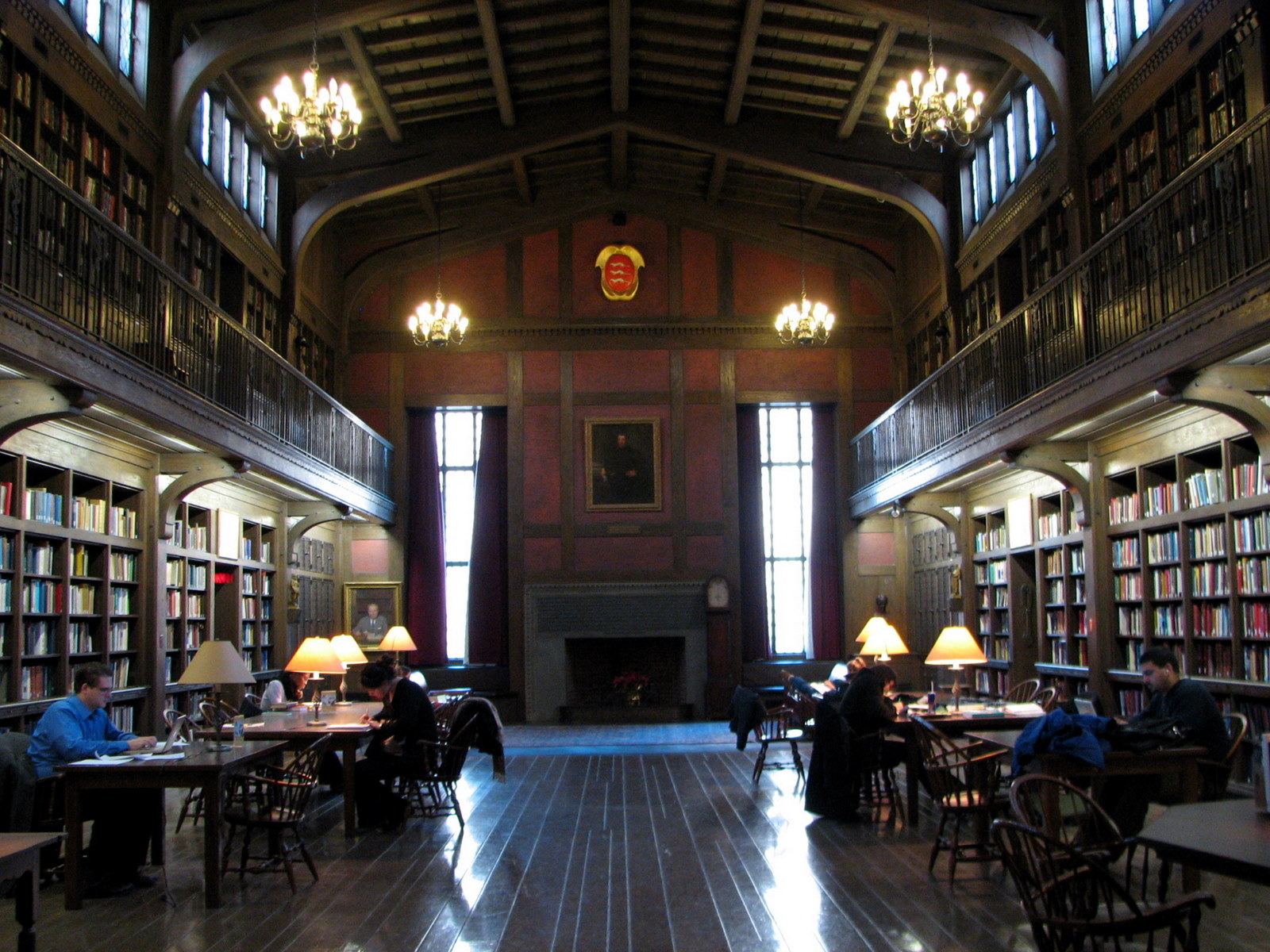
Yale Medical Historical Library

The school employs the "Yale System" established by YSM Dean Milton Winternitz in the 1920s, wherein first- and second-year students are not graded or ranked among their classmates. In addition, course examinations are anonymous and are intended only for students' self-evaluation. Student performance is thus based on seminar participation, qualifying examinations (if a student fails, it is his/her responsibility to meet with a professor and arrange for an alternative assessment—passing grades are not released), clinical clerkship evaluations, and the United States Medical Licensing Examination (USMLE). Prior to graduation, students are required to submit a thesis based on original research.

=== Rankings ===
For 2026, U.S. News & World Report ranked Yale School of Medicine as a Tier 1 medical school in Best Medical Schools: Research, as a Tier 3 school in Best Medical Schools: Primary Care, No.115 in Most Graduates Practicing in Health Professional Shortage Areas, and tied for No.167 in Most Graduates Practicing in Primary Care. The school ranked fourth for NIH research funding in 2025 as reported by the Blue Ridge Institute for Medical Research.

== History ==
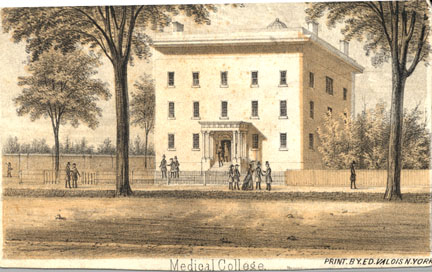
Original building of Yale School of Medicine, formerly a hotel built by James Hillhouse at the corner of Grove and Prospect Streets. Originally leased by Yale, the building was later purchased with funds from the Connecticut State Legislature.

In 18th-century United States, credentials were not needed to practice medicine. Prior to the founding of the medical school, Yale graduates would train through an apprenticeship to become physicians. Yale President Ezra Stiles conceived the idea of training physicians at Yale and ultimately, his successor Timothy Dwight IV helped found the medical school. The school was chartered in 1810 and opened in New Haven in 1813. Nathan Smith (medicine and surgery) and Benjamin Silliman (pharmacology) were the first faculty members. Silliman was a professor of chemistry and taught at both Yale College and the medical school. The other two founding faculty were Jonathan Knight, anatomy, physiology and surgery, and Eli Ives, pediatrics.

One of Yale's earliest medical graduates was Dr. Asaph Leavitt Bissell of Hanover, New Hampshire, who graduated in 1815, a member of the school's second graduating class. Following his graduation, Dr. Bissell moved to Suffield, Connecticut, a tobacco-farming community where his parents had lived and where he practiced as a country physician for the rest of his life. The saddlebags that Dr. Bissell carried in his practice, packed with paper packets and glass bottles, are today in the school's Medical Historical Library.

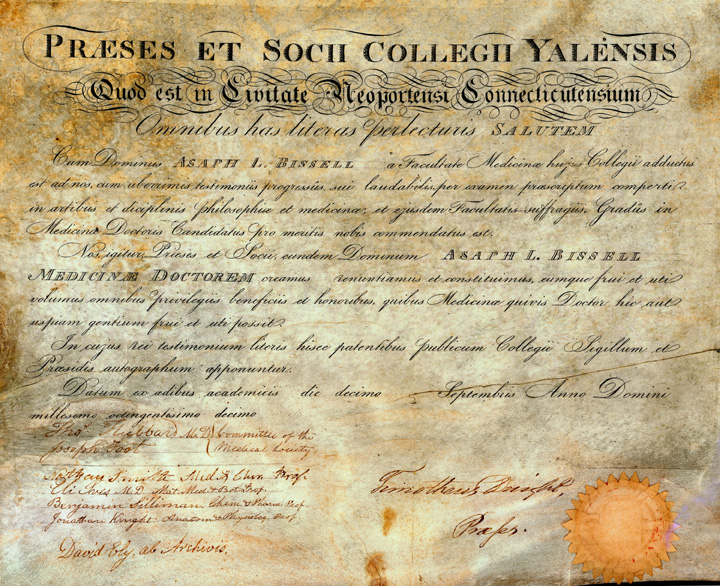
Yale medical diploma awarded Asaph Leavitt Bissell, Class of 1815, signed by school's four professors and Timothy Dwight IV

In 1857, Cortlandt Creed became the first African American to graduate from the school of medicine. After graduation, he stayed in New Haven and developed his practice. During the Civil War, he served as assistant surgeon of the Thirteenth Connecticut Volunteers.

In 1916, a little more than a century after its founding, Yale School of Medicine admitted its first female students. At the time, this stood in marked contrast to the ethos of other institutions such as Harvard, which considered it “unladylike” for women to attend medical school at the time. The three women admitted to the Class of 1916 were exceptional—unlike their male counterparts, who needed only two years of college education, they were required to hold a college degree, and a quota further restricted the number of women who were admitted.

Throughout its history, Yale School of Medicine faculty have been credited with seminal scientific discoveries. Pediatrician Martha May Eliot, MD, who was recruited to Yale by Edwards A. Park, MD, chair of the medical school’s first Department of Pediatrics, are together credited with developing a cure for rickets in 1925.

Early in 1942, Louis S. Goodman, MD, and Alfred Gilman, PhD, assistant professors in Yale’s new Department of Pharmacology, began to study nitrogen mustard, an agent that was derived from a lethal gas used in the trenches of World War I. Building on research that had languished for years, the two young scientists found in a derivative of mustard gas the first effective chemotherapy for cancer.

In 1998, Charles Janeway, MD, Yale Cancer Center immunologist, established and proved his theory of innate immunity.

In the 1960s, Louis Gluck, MD, a member of the Department of Pediatrics faculty, created the first neonatal intensive care unit (NICU). In the late 1970s, William Tamborlane, MD, and the late Robert Sherwin, MD, transformed the treatment of type 1 diabetes by developing the insulin pump.

Research led by Yale School of Medicine endocrinologist Kevan Herold, MD, resulted in the Food and Drug Administration's approval in 2022 of teplizumab (Tzield®), a medication that can delay the onset of type 1 diabetes—marking the first treatment to change the course of this autoimmune disease since the discovery of insulin in 1922.

In the field of psychiatry, following pioneering research led by Yale School of Medicine psychiatrist John Krystal, MD, and his colleagues Dennis Charney, MD, and Ronald Duman, PhD, the Food and Drug Administration approved in 2019 a nasal spray called esketamine, derived from ketamine (an anesthetic with rapid-acting effect), for treatment-resistant depression.

The original building (at Grove and Prospect) later became Sheffield Hall, part of the Sheffield Scientific School (razed in 1931). In 1860, the school moved to Medical Hall on York Street, near Chapel (this building was razed in 1957). In 1925, the school moved to its current campus, neighboring the hospital. This campus includes the Sterling Hall of Medicine (erected in 1925), Boyer Center for Molecular Medicine (1991, designed by Cesar Pelli), Anlyan Center (2003, designed by Payette Associates and Venturi Scott Brown) and the Amistad Building (2007, designed by Herbert Newman)).

On March 28, 2022, Jamie Petrone-Codrington, a former administrator pled guilty to fraud and tax charges for the theft of over $40 million of computer and electronic software. Jamie Petrone-Codrington illegally bought and sold hardware purchased for the School of Medicine, starting in 2013. According to the court records, Petrone-Codrington was turned in by an anonymous tip after being seen loading computer equipment into her private vehicle, and after ordering high volumes of equipment.

== Clinical Affiliations ==
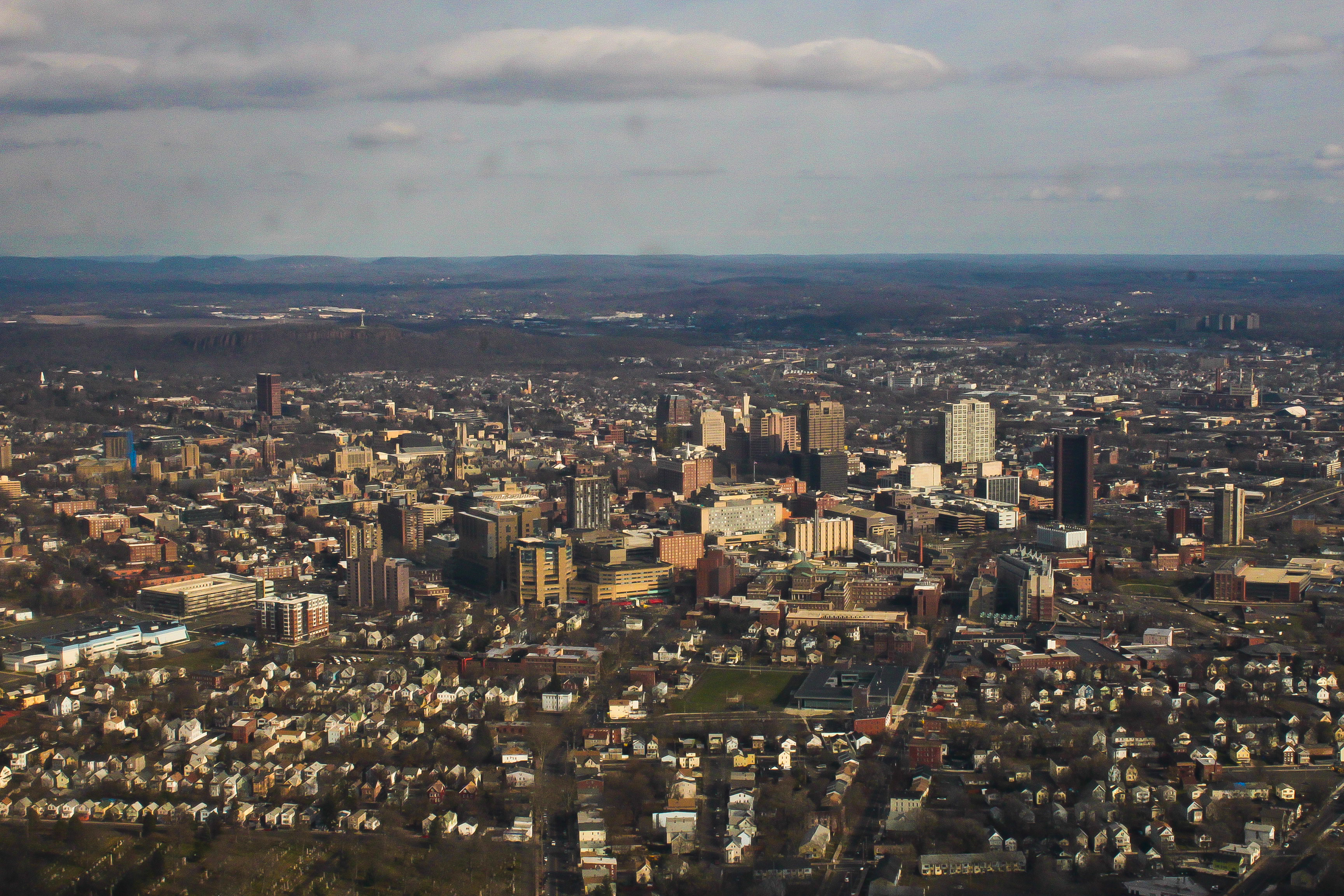
Yale's medical campus and The Hill neighborhood from the south

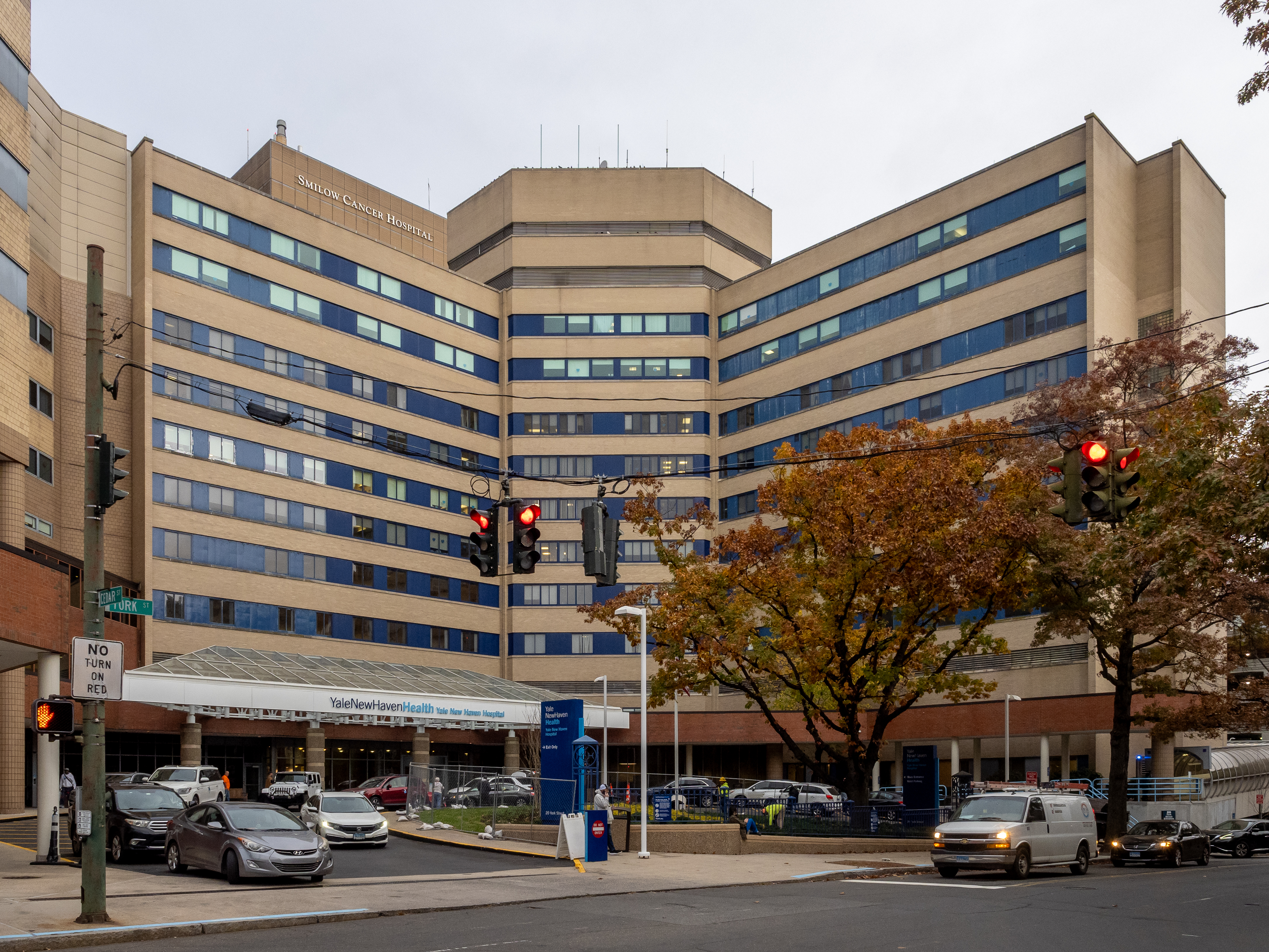
Yale New Haven Hospital, York Street entrance, New Haven, CT.

An affiliation agreement between the medical school and Grace-New Haven Community Hospital in 1965 created Yale New Haven Hospital (YNHH), which expanded in 1993 with the opening of the Children’s Hospital, and again in 2000 with the acquisition of the Psychiatric Hospital.

In 1999, an affiliation agreement was established between the medical school and Yale New Haven Health System, which includes multiple non-profit healthcare enterprises, to collaboratively grow in the areas of clinical programs, clinical research, and medical education.

In 2009, the 14-story Smilow Cancer Hospital opened, and in 2012 YNHH acquired the Hospital of Saint Raphael, adding 533 beds and making it one of the largest hospitals in the United States. Today, larger medical collaborations have grown to include the educational, research, clinical, and healthcare facilities associated with Yale School of Medicine and Yale New Haven Health System, including those listed below.

- Connecticut Mental Health Center
- Yale Health
- Yale Medicine
- Yale School of Medicine
- VA Connecticut Health System
- Yale New Haven Health, including:
  - Bridgeport Hospital
  - Greenwich Hospital
  - Lawrence + Memorial Hospital
  - Northeast Medical Group
  - Westerly Hospital
  - Yale New Haven Hospital
  - Yale New Haven Children's Hospital
  - Yale New Haven Psychiatric Hospital
  - Smilow Cancer Hospital at Yale New Haven

The affiliated VA Connecticut Healthcare System, located in West Haven, maintains clinical, research, and education programs in conjunction with many medical school departments. The Department of Psychiatry collaborates with the Connecticut Mental Health Center to provide recovery-oriented mental health services for thousands of people in the Greater New Haven area each year.

== Deans ==
Before 1845, there was no dean. Nathan Smith, followed by Jonathan Knight, provided leadership in the early years. Thereafter, physicians of various specialities have served as dean of the medical school:

- Charles Hooker (1845–1863): professor of anatomy and physiology
- Charles Augustus Lindsley (1863–1885): physician and professor of materia, medica, and therapeutics; later professor of the theory and practice of medicine
- Herbert Eugene Smith (1885–1910): physician and chemist
- George Blumer (1910–1920): pathologist, internist, and scientist
- Milton Winternitz (1920–1935): pathologist
- Stanhope Bayne-Jones, MD (1935–1940): bacteriologist
- Francis Gilman Blake, MD (1940–1947): immunologist
- Cyril Norman Hugh Long, MD (1947–1952): physician and biochemist
- Vernon W. Lippard (1952–1967): pediatrician
- Frederick Carl Redlich, MD (1967–1972): psychiatrist
- Lewis Thomas, MD (1972–1973): immunologist and author
- Robert Berliner (1973–1984): renal physiologist
- Leon Rosenberg, MD (1984–1991): geneticist
- Robert M. Donaldson, MD (acting) (1991–1992): gastroenterologist
- Gerard N. Burrow, MD (1992–1997): endocrinologist
- David Aaron Kessler, MD (1997–2003): pediatrician, lawyer, and former commissioner of the Food and Drug Administration
- Dennis Spencer (acting) (2003–2004): neurosurgeon
- Robert Alpern (2004–2020): nephrologist
- Nancy J. Brown, MD (2020–present): internist and clinical pharmacologist

== Notable faculty ==
The faculty includes 31 National Academy of Sciences members, 50 National Academy of Medicine members, and nine Howard Hughes Medical Institute (HHMI) investigators/professors. Yale School of Medicine faculty have also received various international awards for their scientific discoveries, impactful research, and professional achievements. The Nobel Prize in Physiology or Medicine has been awarded to seven current or former faculty members, and the Nobel Prize in Chemistry to two faculty members.

=== Current ===
- Amy Arnsten, PhD, Albert E. Kent Professor of Neuroscience and professor of psychology (National Academy of Medicine, 2017)
- Macrene Alexiades (fellow of the American Academy of Dermatology)
- Pietro De Camilli, MD, John Klingenstein Professor of Neuroscience and professor of cell biology (E.B. Wilson Medal 2021; Julius Axelrod Prize, 2015; American Association for the Advancement of Science, 2012; Institute of Medicine, 2005; American Academy of Arts & Sciences, 2001; National Academy of Sciences, 2001; HHMI Investigator, 1992)
- Vincent DeVita Jr., MD, Amy and Joseph Perella Professor of Medicine (Medical Oncology) and professor of epidemiology (Lasker Award, 1972)
- Richard Flavell, PhD, Sterling Professor of Immunobiology (William B. Coley Award, 2012; Vilcek Prize in Biomedical Science, 2013)
- Jorge Galàn, DVM, PhD, Lucille P. Markey Professor of Microbial Pathogenesis and professor of cell biology (National Academy of Sciences, 2015; NIH MERIT Award, 2000 and 2015; National Academy of Sciences, 2013)
- Valentina Greco, PhD, Carolyn Slayman Professor of Geneitcs (HHMI Investigator, 2024; International Society for Stem Cell Research Momentum Award, 2021; NIH Director’s Pioneer Award, 2019)
- Arthur L Horwich, MD, professor emeritus of genetics (Lasker Award, 2011; American Academy of Arts and Sciences, 2021; Breakthrough Prize in Life Sciences, 2020; Paul Ehrlich and Ludwig Darmstaedter Prize, 2019; Dr. Paul Janssen Award for Biomedical Research, 2019; E.B. Wilson Medal, 2017; Institute of Medicine, 2008; National Academy of Sciences, 2003)
- Akiko Iwasaki, PhD, Sterling Professor of Immunobiology and professor of dermatology and of molecular, cellular & developmental biology, and of epidemiology (Nakaaki Tsukahara Memorial Award, 2024; president of American Association of Immunologists, 2024; Else Kröner Fresenius Prize for Medical Research, 2023; National Academy of Medicine, 2019; National Academy of Sciences, 2018; HHMI Investigator, 2014)
- Haifan Lin, PhD, Eugene Higgins Professor of Cell Biology and professor of genetics, of obstetrics, gynecology & reproductive sciences, and of dermatology, director of Yale Stem Cell Center (Francis Amory Prize, 2024; National Academy of Medicine, 2024; National Academy of Sciences, 2018; American Academy of Arts and Sciences, 2018; American Association for the Advancement of Science, 2010)
- Ruslan Medzhitov, PhD, Sterling Professor of Immunobiology (Jessie Stevenson Kovalenko Medal, 2024; Dickson Prize in Medicine, 2019; William B. Coley Award, 2013; Else Kröner Fresenius Prize for Medical Research, 2013; National Academy of Sciences, 2010; HHMI Investigator, 2000)
- Marcella Nunez-Smith, MD, MHS, CNH Long Professor of Internal Medicine (General Medicine) and professor of epidemiology (chronic disease) and of public health, associate dean for health equity research (National Academy of Medicine, 2021)
- Lucila Ohno-Machado, MD, MBA, PhD, Waldemar von Zedtwitz Professor of Medicine and of Biomedical Informatics & Data Science, deputy dean for biomedical informatics, chair of biomedical informatics & data science (inaugural Helen M. Ranney Award, 2024; American College of Medical Informatics Distinguished Fellow, 2023; National Academy of Medicine, 2018)
- Marina Picciotto, PhD, Charles B.G. Murphy Professor of Psychiatry and professor in the Yale Child Study Center, of neuroscience, and of pharmacology (President of the Society for Neuroscience, 2023–24; American Academy of Arts & Sciences, 2024; Carnegie Prize in Mind & Brain Sciences, 2020; Langley Award, 2020)
- Pasko Rakic, MD, PhD, Dorys McConnell Duberg Professor of Neuroscience and professor of neurology (Connecticut Medal of Science, 2019; Kavli Prize in neuroscience, 2008; Bristol Myers Squibb Neuroscience Award, 2003)
- James Rothman, PhD, Sterling Professor of Cell Biology and professor of chemistry (Lasker Award, 2002; Nobel Prize in Physiology or Medicine, 2013)
- David G. Schatz, PhD, Waldemar Von Zedtwitz Professor of Immunobiology and Professor of Molecular Biophysics and Biochemistry, chair, Immunobiology (Pail Ehrlich and Ludwig Darmstaedter Prize, 2022; National Academy of Medicine, 2019; National Academy of Sciences, 2018; American Association for the Advancement of Science, 2016; American Academy of Arts and Sciences, 2014)
- Joseph Schlessinger, PhD, Willian H. Prusoff Professor of Pharmacology (BBVA Frontiers of Knowledge Award, 2015; Institute of Medicine, 2005; American Academy of Arts and Sciences, 2001)
- Nenad Sestan, MD, PhD, Harvey and Kate Cushing Professor of Neuroscience and professor of comparative medicine, of genetics, and of psychiatry (Kavli Instituteof Medicine Innovative Research Award, 2022; National Academy of Medicine, 2019)
- Joan A. Steitz, PhD, Sterling Professor of Molecular Biophysics & Biochemistry (Wolf Prize, 2021; Lasker-Koshland Award, 2018; E.B. Wilson Medal, 2005; National Medal of Science, 1986; National Academy of Sciences, 1983; American Academy of Arts and Sciences, 1983)
- Stephen Strittmatter, MD, PhD, Vincent Coates Professor of Neurology and professor of neuroscience (Association of American Physicians, 2024; King Faisal Prize for Medicine, 2021)
- Mary Tinetti, MD; Gladys Philips Crofoot Professor of Medicine (Geriatrics) (MacArthur Foundation Fellow, 2009; National Academy of Medicine, 2007)
- Emily Wang, MD, professor of medicine and of public health (National Academy of Medicine, 2023; MacArthur Foundation Fellow, 2022; American Society of Clinical Investigation, 2021)

=== Past ===
- Sidney Altman, PhD (1939-2022): Sterling Professor of Molecular, Cellular & Developmental Biology, discovered the catalytic properties of RNA, Nobel Prize in Chemistry, 1989
- Paul B Beeson, MD (1908-2006): chair and professor of internal medicine and expert in infection
- C. Lee Buxton, MD (1904-1969): obstetrician, birth control advocate, and appellant in Griswold v. Connecticut
- Russell Henry Chittenden, PhD, (1856-1943): physiological chemist, pioneer of digestion and nutrition
- James William Colbert, Jr., MD (1920-1974): immunologist, assistant dean of postgraduate education
- Harvey Cushing, MD (1869-1939): neurosurgeon, pioneer of brain surgery, identified Cushing's syndrome
- Jennifer Doudna, PhD (1964-); former Henry Ford II Professor of Molecular Biophysics and Biochemistry, Nobel Prize in Chemistry, 2020
- John F. Enders, PhD (1897-1985): vaccine pioneer, including development of the measles vaccine
- Marilyn Farquhar, PhD (1928-2019): cell biologist, first female Sterling Professor at Yale
- Alvan R. Feinstein, PhD (1925-2001): clinician, health informatician, epidemiologist (the father of modern clinical epidemiology), Sterling Professor of Medicine and Epidemiology, author of Clinical Judgment (1967) and Clinical Epidemiology: The Architecture of Clinical Research (1985)
- Stephen Fleck, MD (1912–2002): psychiatrist, coauthor of Schizophrenia and the Family
- John Farquhar Fulton, MD, DSc (1899–1960): Sterling Professor of Physiology, neurophysiology of primates
- Arnold Gesell, MD (1880-1961): psychologist and pediatrician, developed the Yale Child Study Center
- Alfred Gilman Sr., PhD (1908-1984): pharmacologist, chemotherapy pioneer and co-author of The Pharmacological Basis of Therapeutics
- Patricia Goldman-Rakic, PhD (1937–2003): neurobiologist, pioneer of studies on the frontal lobe and the cellular basis of working memory
- Paul Greengard, PhD (1925-2019); former professor of pharmacology and psychiatry, Nobel Prize in Physiology or Medicine, 2000
- Harry S.N. Greene, MD (1904–1969): professor of pathology
- Beatrix Hamburg, MD (1923-2018): adolescent psychiatrist and the first African-American female to attend Yale School of Medicine
- Orvan Hess, MD (1906-2002): developed the fetal heart monitor and early use of penicillin
- Dorothy Horstmann, MD (1911-2001): epidemiologist, virologist, pioneer in the study of polio, first female to receive an endowed chair at Yale
- James D. Jamieson, MD, PhD (1934–2018): cell biologist, established the function of the Golgi apparatus alongside George Palade, MD
- Brian Kobilka, MD (1955- ): physiologist, YSM alumnus, recipient of the Nobel Prize in Chemistry, 2012
- Theodore Lidz, MD (1910-2001): Sterling Professor of Psychiatry, researcher of schizophrenia
- Lafayette Mendel, PhD (1872–1935): biochemist, discoverer of vitamin A, vitamin B, and essential amino acids
- Sherwin B. Nuland, MD (1930-2014): clinical professor of surgery, winner of the National Book Award for How We Die: Reflections on Life's Final Chapter
- George Emil Palade, MD (1912-2008): a founding father of modern cell biology, Sterling Professor of Cell Biology, Nobel Prize in Physiology or Medicine, 1974
- William Prusoff, PhD (1920-2011): discovered idoxuridine, the first antiviral agent approved by the Food and Drug Administration, and discovered the anti-HIV effect of stavudine(D4T)
- Juan Rosai, MD (1940-2020): professor of pathology and director of the Department of Anatomic Pathology, author of surgical pathology textbook, discovered Rosai-Dorfman disease and desmoplastic small round cell tumor
- Leon E. Rosenberg, MD (1933-2022): dean and inaugural chair of the Department of Genetics
- Richard Selzer, MD (1928-2016): surgeon and author
- Nathan Smith, MD (1762-1829): professor of physics, surgery and obstetrics, founder of Dartmouth Medical School and co-founder of the University of Vermont College of Medicine
- Albert J. Solnit, MD (1919-2002): psychoanalyst, child rights advocate, and Sterling Professor of Psychiatry
- Thomas A. Steitz, PhD (1940–2018): Sterling Professor of Biophysics and Biochemistry, 2009 Nobel Prize in Chemistry, discovered the atomic structure of the ribosome
- Edward Tatum, PhD (1909-1975): former professor of microbiology, Nobel Prize in Physiology or Medicine, 1958
- Max Theiler, MD (1899-1972): former professor of epidemiology and microbiology, Nobel Prize in Physiology or Medicine, 1951
- Richard W. Tsien, PhD (1945–): former assistant professor in the Department of Physiology, characterized calcium channel types
- John Vane, DPhil (1927-2004): former assistant professor the Department of Pharmacology, Nobel Prize in Physiology or Medicine, 1982
- Frans Wackers, MD, PhD (1939-): nuclear cardiologist, former director of the Cardiovascular Nuclear Imaging and Stress Laboratories
- Ruth Whittemore, MD (1918-2001): pediatric cardiologist who provided pre- and post-operative care for the infant who received the first “blue baby” operation in 1944
- Milton Winternitz, MD (1885-1959): dean, established the Yale System of Medical Education

== See also ==
- List of Yale University people
- List of Ivy League medical schools
- Brain Function Laboratory
