= Giebisch =

Giebisch is a German surname. Notable people with the surname include:

- Gerhard Giebisch (1927–2020), American physiologist
- Leopold Giebisch (1901–1945), Austrian footballer
- Susi Giebisch (born 1930), Austrian pair skater
