= Bridgeport Hospital =

Hospital in Connecticut, US

- Yale New Haven Health System

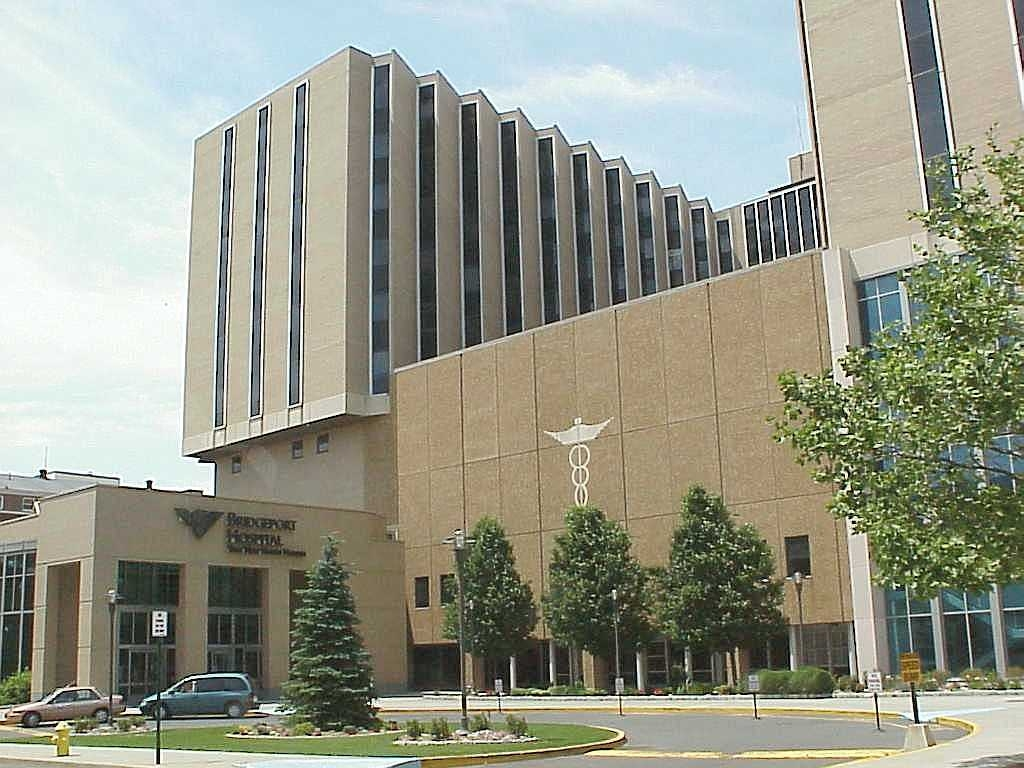
- The front entrance of the Bridgeport Hospital

Geography
- Location: Bridgeport, Connecticut, United States
- Coordinates: 41.1888°N 73.1664°W

Organization
- Care system: Private
- Affiliated university: Yale University School of Medicine

Services
- Standards: American College of Surgeons; Joint Commission
- Emergency department: Level II trauma center
- Beds: 501

Helipads
- Helipad: FAA LID: 0CT7
Number	Length		Surface
Number	ft	m	Surface
H1	48	15	Concrete, rooftop

History
- Founded: 1878

Links
- Website: www.bridgeporthospital.org
- Lists: Hospitals in Connecticut

Bridgeport Hospital is a not-for-profit general medical and surgical hospital in Bridgeport, Connecticut. It is a member of Yale New Haven Health System and affiliated with Yale School of Medicine.

== History ==
In the 1870s, Dr. George Lewis, a physician practicing in the city, persuaded his aunt, Susan Hubbell, to bequeath $13,500 and an acre at the summit of Mill Hill for the construction of a hospital, the first in Fairfield County, and only the third in the state. Before Bridgeport Hospital, "the closest thing to a hospital in the city was a facility in the basement of the future police headquarters, where infection and mortality rates were high among the emergency patients and poor residents who received care there," according to the hospital's web site.

The hospital was founded in 1878 when Bridgeport Mayor P.T. Barnum and other community leaders received approval from the state legislature to incorporate the institution. When a board of directors was named soon afterward, Barnum was elected its first president. Construction on the present site began in 1883 to designs by local architects Lambert & Bunnell. On November 12, 1884, the new hospital began treating patients.

== Description ==
Bridgeport Hospital has 501 beds on two campuses, plus 42 beds licensed to Yale New Haven Children's Hospital. It has more than 2,900 employees and more than 1,110 physicians representing more than 60 sub-specialties and 230 medical/surgical residents and fellows in programs affiliated with Yale School of Medicine.

The hospital operates a second campus on the site of the former Milford Hospital in Milford, Connecticut, which was integrated with Bridgeport Hospital by Yale New Haven Health in June 2019.

Bridgeport Hospital is an American College of Surgeons-certified Level II trauma center. and is equipped with a helipad. During 2018, Bridgeport Hospital received professional recognition for diabetes treatment, and local economic partnership.

In its 2020 fiscal year, the hospital had 21,686 inpatient discharges and 75,634 emergency department visits. The hospital is accredited by the Joint Commission.

== Tele ICU ==
Bridgeport is one of a growing number of hospitals in the US running an Intensive Care Unit via a teledoctor. In April 2026, the hospital was sued by the parents of a young man who died in 2025 while in that Tele ICU; the parents say their son died after being brought in for stomach distress, and that there were not told that their son was in the ICU but was never seen by a real on-site doctor qualified to provide him the care he needed. He died that night without his parents being informed of his condition.
