= Nancy J. Brown =

American physician-scientist

- Spouse: Andrew L. May (m. 1983)

Academic background
- Education: Yale University (BA); Harvard University (MD)

Academic work
- Institutions: Yale University School of Medicine; Vanderbilt University School of Medicine

Nancy J. Brown is an American physician-scientist. She is the Jean and David W. Wallace Dean and C.N.H. Long Professor of Internal Medicine at Yale University School of Medicine, having formerly served as the Hugh Jackson Morgan Professor of Medicine and Pharmacology, and Chair and Physician-in-Chief of the Department of Medicine at Vanderbilt University School of Medicine.

== Early life and education ==
Brown is the youngest of three children of United States Air Force General Donald D. Brown and Joan (McAndrews) Brown. Brown attended seven schools, including the Cathedral School in Agana, Guam, and three high schools before enrolling at Yale University and then Harvard Medical School. She graduated from Yale College in 1981 and earned her medical degree at Harvard before completing her residency in internal medicine and a fellowship in clinical pharmacology at Vanderbilt University School of Medicine. In her first year of medical school, Brown married Yale College classmate and United States Marine Corps Lieutenant Andrew L. May.

== Career ==
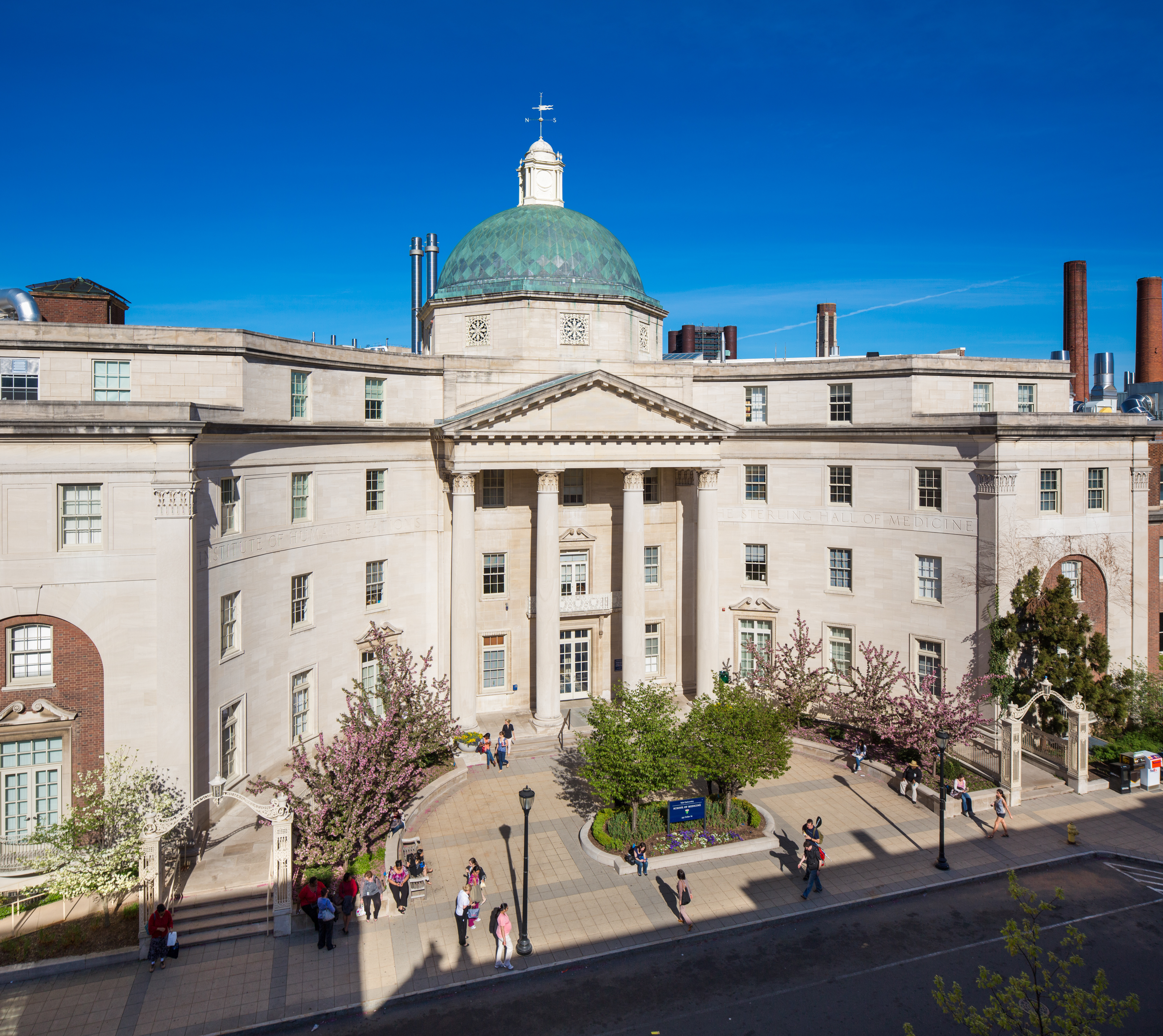
Sterling Hall of Medicine, the central building of Yale School of Medicine, where Brown has been dean since February 1, 2020.

After completing medical training, a fellowship in clinical pharmacology, and the Hugh J. Morgan chief residency, Brown joined the faculty at Vanderbilt University School of Medicine in 1992. She developed a research program studying vascular biology in humans, focusing on how hormone cascades involved in blood pressure regulation affect clotting and inflammation, and the risk of stroke or heart attack. In 2000, she co-founded Vanderbilt's MSCI (Master of Science in Clinical Investigation) program with Thomas A. Hazinski, and by 2006, a partner program was created at Japan's Tokai University.

In 2006, Brown was appointed as associate dean for Clinical and Translational Scientist Development, and developed infrastructure for physician-scientist development. In 2009, Brown was named chief of Clinical Pharmacology at Vanderbilt. In 2010, Brown was appointed the Hugh J. Morgan Professor and the first female Chair of Vanderbilt's Department of Medicine. She also served on various academic boards including the National Institutes of Health, the American Society of Hypertension, the American Heart Association, and the Association of American Medical Colleges. She also was an associate editor for the journal Hypertension.

Brown was recognized by numerous medical organizations for her work in internal medicine. She was elected a member of the American Society for Clinical Investigation, the Association of American Physicians, the Institute of Medicine (now the National Academy of Medicine), the Connecticut Academy of Science and Engineering, and the American Academy of Arts and Sciences. She is a Fellow of the American Association for the Advancement of Science, the Royal College of Physicians, and a Master of the American College of Physicians.

Awards and honors Brown has received during her career include the Young Scholar Award from the American Society of Hypertension, the American Federation for Medical Research Outstanding Investigator Award, the American Heart Association's Harriet Dustan Award, and the August M. Watanabe Prize in Translation Research from the Indiana Clinical and Translational Sciences Institute.

In 2020, Brown left Vanderbilt to become the 17th dean of the Yale University School of Medicine. She is the first woman to serve in this role.

== Personal life ==
Brown and her husband, currently president and chief financial officer of Truxton Trust, have three sons and four grandchildren.
