= Carolyn Slayman =

American geneticist (1937–2016)

Carolyn Walch Slayman (1937–2016) was an American geneticist. She was on the faculty of the Yale School of Medicine, where she was appointed Sterling Professor in 1991.

On March 11, 1937, she was born in Portland, Maine. In 1958, she graduated from Swarthmore College with highest honors in biology and chemistry and was elected to Phi Beta Kappa. She began graduate school at Johns Hopkins University to study biochemistry but transferred to Rockefeller University in 1959 where she was the only woman in her class. In 1963, she earned her doctorate in biochemical genetics. She was a postdoctoral fellow in membrane biochemistry at Cambridge University. After a short time stint as an assistant professor at Case Western Reserve, she joined the Yale departments of microbiology and physiology in 1967.

At Yale, she became a pioneer in genetics and a leader on campus. She helped to establish the graduate program in the Department of Human Genetics in 1972 and served as director of graduate studies in genetics from 1972 to 1984. In 1984, she was made Chair of the Department of Genetics, becoming the first woman to head a department in the medical school. Seven years later, she became only the second woman to be named a Sterling Professor. Her appointment was in the Department of Genetics. In 1995, she was appointed deputy dean for academic and scientific affairs of the Yale School of Medicine. As deputy dean, she oversaw academic and scientific affairs at the school with special attention to faculty recruitment and development in addition to the creation and advancement of research programs and core facilities. She served as deputy dean until she died in 2016, and had been affiliated with the School of Medicine for nearly 50 years.
