= Harvey Cushing/John Hay Whitney Medical Library =

Library at Yale University

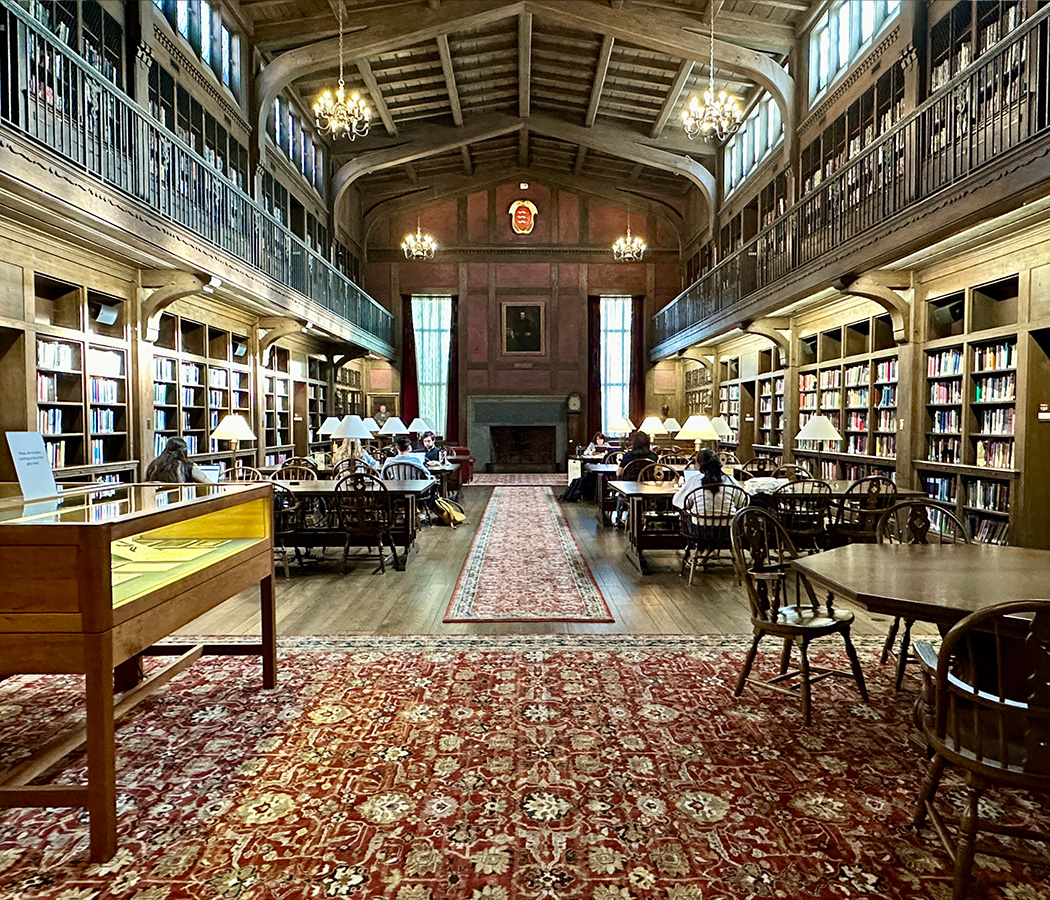
- Medical Historical Reading Room

- Location within Connecticut

General information
- Type: Library
- Location: 333 Cedar Street, New Haven, Connecticut, United States
- Coordinates: 41.30300°N 72.93325°W
- Completed: 1940
- Opened: June 15, 1941
- Cost: $600,000
- Owner: Yale University

Website
- library.medicine.yale.edu

The Harvey Cushing/John Hay Whitney Medical Library (abbreviated as Cushing/Whitney Medical Library) is the medical library of Yale University in New Haven, Connecticut. It primarily serves the Yale School of Medicine, the Yale School of Nursing, and Yale New Haven Hospital.

== History ==
The Library was built in 1941 as a Y-shaped addition to the Sterling Hall of Medicine designed by Grosvenor Atterbury with funds from the estate of John William Sterling.

The library was renovated and expanded in 1990 with funds from Betsey Cushing Whitney. The architects for the project were Alexander Purves and Allan Dehar. After the renovation, the Library was named in honor of Betsey Cushing Whitney's father, Dr. Harvey Cushing (the pioneering neurosurgeon, Yale graduate, and Sterling Professor) and Betsey Cushing Whitney's husband, John Hay Whitney (a businessman, Yale graduate, and philanthropist).

The library underwent another renovation in 2019.

== Medical Historical Library ==
The Medical Historical Library was founded by Harvey Cushing, John F. Fulton, and Arnold C. Klebs in 1941 and possesses an internationally important collection of early and rare books, manuscripts, and other materials related to the history of medicine. Much of the early organization was carried out by Madeline Stanton, who was a librarian there from 1949 to 1968. Among its treasures are numerous rare medieval and Renaissance manuscripts, including works of Islamic and Persian provenance. Its holdings of printed books are spectacular and include over 300 medical incunabula as well as significant gatherings of Hippocrates, Galen, Vesalius, Robert Boyle, William Harvey, and S. Weir Mitchell in historical editions. The Clements C. Fry Print Collection possesses rare prints and drawings from the last four hundred years with outstanding examples by James Gillray, George Cruikshank, William Hogarth, Honoré Daumier and others.

The Edward C. Streeter Collection of Weights and Measures features one of the most geographically and historically comprehensive collections of weights and measures in the world. The Library also houses hundreds of important manuscript and papers collections from the last four centuries. Some of its important individual collections include: Harvey Cushing Papers, John Farquhar Fulton Papers, Charles Goff Collection on Christopher Columbus, Grace Goldin Historic Hospital Image Collection, Arnold C. Klebs Papers, Laetrile Collection, Averill W. Liebow Papers, Meyer & Macia Friedman DNA Collection, S. Weir Mitchell Papers, Peter Parker Papers and Lam Qua Portraits, Ivan P. Pavlov Papers, Herbert Thoms Papers, G. D. Hsiung Papers, and the Tobacco Advertisement Collection.

== Collections and services ==
The Library's collections cover clinical medicine and its specialties, the pre-clinical sciences, public health, nursing, and related fields. They also include the Historical Library's distinguished holdings. The library now holds over 416,000 volumes. As of 2016, the Library provided Yale users with access to over 23,000 online journals in the health sciences, as well as licensing bioinformatics tools, clinical point-of-care reference tools, and systematic review software. Library staff provide a range of information services for Yale users, including interlibrary loan and document delivery; classroom training on literature searching, citation management, and other research skills; one-on-one consultations; expert searching for projects including systematic review and meta-analyses; and video production services for the Yale curriculum. The Library hosts an extensive collection of free online instructional videos on topics including database searching, citation management, evidence-based practice, and research impact. In addition to its collections and information services, the Library hosts wellness programming including weekly drop-in mindfulness practice and visits from a therapy dog.

== The Cushing Center ==
The Cushing Center, located within the Library, serves as a museum dedicated to the life and work of Dr. Cushing. It contains a collection of brain tumor specimens from Dr. Cushing's patients, photos of the patients, a range of personal documents and memorabilia related to Cushing, and some of the highlights of the Medical Historical Library's special collections. It is open to the public for visit, with weekly guided tours and group tours available upon request.
