= Averill A. Liebow =

American pathologist (1911–1978)

Averill Abraham Liebow (March 31, 1911 – May 31, 1978) was an international leader on the pathology of the lung. He is credited with the development of a classification system for lung disease. His observations resulted in the discovery of new diseases. Liebow was among the first scientists to enter Hiroshima, Japan, after the atomic bomb was dropped in 1945. Accounts of that experience were published in "Encounter With Disaster: A Medical Diary of Hiroshima" and "Medical Effects of the Atomic Bomb in Japan."

== Life and career ==
Averill Abraham Liebow was born in 1911 in Stryj (Galicia, Hapsburg Empire). Poverty, famine, and instability led the Liebows to emigrate to the United States in 1920. Averill Liebow became a U.S. citizen in 1926.

Liebow graduated magnum cum laude from City College of New York, and received his medical degree from Yale School of Medicine in 1935. Appointed an assistant in pathology at Yale in 1935, he rose through the ranks to full professor in 1951. In 1968 he accepted the chairmanship of the department of pathology at the University of California, San Diego, which he held until his retirement in 1975.

During World War II, Liebow served as a pathologist with the 39th General Hospital, the Yale Unit in the South Pacific. During this time, he compiled studies of cutaneous diphtheria that made specific treatment possible for a form of "jungle rot," which was a major problem in the South Pacific theater of the war.

In 1975, he suffered a fatal stroke while conducting a course in pulmonary pathology.

== Contributions to pulmonary pathology ==
Liebow was one of the leading world experts in pulmonary pathology. He described many new pulmonary entities.

The basis of many of his early observations was the plastic cast of the human or canine tracheobronchial tree and its vascular supply. This methodology provided a permanent specimen which could be measured, photographed, or even colorfully painted to delineate the bronchopulmonary segments. Bronchial artery casting techniques, modified and refined by Liebow and his colleagues, demonstrated the importance of dual circulation in the lung, particularly in inflammatory diseases of the airways.

Liebow's interest pulmonary circulation continued throughout his career. The physiology of hypervolemic and neurogenic pulmonary edema was studied in his laboratory. He described important aspects of vascular pathology in pulmonary emphysema, notably the expansion of the bronchial venous collateral circulation. Experimental pulmonary arterial hypertension (aorta to pulmonary artery shunt) and effects of hyperkinesis (total pulmonary flow diverted to one lung) were shown to be reliable models for human pulmonary hypertension.

With publication in 1952 of the Armed Forces Institute of Pathology (AFIP) fascicle Tumors of the Lower Respiratory Tract, Liebow became widely recognized as an authority on surgical lesions of the lung. In 1969, Liebow and Charles B. Carrington published the first histological classification of idiopathic interstitial lung diseases (IIPs). Their landmark histopathologic classification schema for IIPs consisted of five patterns: usual interstitial pneumonia (UIP), bronchiolitis obliterans interstitial pneumonia and diffuse alveolar damage, desquamative interstitial pneumonia, lymphocytic interstitial pneumonia (LIP), and giant cell interstitial pneumonia.

Liebow became the foremost consultant in lung pathology in the United States. Several of his descriptive analyses represent the original definition of previously unrecognized conditions.

== Joint Commission for the Investigation of the Effects of the Atomic Bomb in Japan ==
Immediately after World War II concluded, Liebow was recruited as a member of the Joint Commission for the Investigation of the Effects of the Atomic Bomb in Japan organized by Col. Ashley W. Oughterson and Prof. Masao Tsuzuki of Japan. The team was sent to survey the biological and medical consequences of the atomic explosions. Liebow and the members of the Commission reached Hiroshima on October 12, 1945.

Liebow chronicled the experience in a diary in shorthand. His knowledge of shorthand enabled him to keep accurate records, from which he later published a memoir. In 1965, the Yale Journal of Biology and Medicine published Liebow's diary under the title "Encounter with Disaster: a Medical Diary of Hiroshima, 1945." Portions of Liebow's original shorthand diary and other records of his time in Japan are archived at the Harvey Cushing/John Hay Whitney Medical Library.

The joint commission was charged with collecting a large amount of data, including the location of all casualties, living or dead, evidence of how casualties occurred (whether caused by the explosion or from secondary effects like building fires or flying debris), and evidence of residual radiation. Liebow's commander, Col. Ashley Oughterson, a professor of surgery at Yale, set a goal of examining and interviewing 10,000 patients. Liebow effectively collaborated with Japanese physicians and pathologists and developed a friendly relationship to many of them. Japanese doctors had arrived in the city shortly after the bombing and had already been investigating its effects on human health. (Liebow's archive includes a translated testimonial by a Japanese pathologist who on Aug. 10, 1945 performed the first autopsy of a bomb victim: a 13-year-old boy.)

While in Tokyo, Liebow was asked to translate a detailed eyewitness account of the bombing of Hiroshima written in German by Johannes Siemes, a Jesuit priest who had been leading a mission just outside the city. Liebow describes collecting clothing damaged during the explosion and noted that the darker portions of a patterned dress were burned out while lighter portions were spared. He describes seeing the shadows of people burned into the roadway of a bridge near the blast. He describes visiting a village three months after the bombing where the residents' faces were still burned a dark-brown color called "the mask of Hiroshima."

Liebow returned to the United States in January 1946 and helped draft the joint commission's 1,300-page report, which was completed on Sept. 6, 1946. Written in collaboration with Shields Warren, the report is considered a milestone in atomic and radiation pathology. As one of his last official acts, Liebow composed a letter under Oughterson's signature recommending the continued study of the medical effects of the atomic bomb. In response, the Truman administration ordered the establishment of the Atomic Bomb Casualty Commission to study the effects of radiation among the atomic bomb survivors. The commission operated until 1975.

Liebow concludes his account of his experiences in Hiroshima with philosophical reflection on the atomic bomb. "The use of the weapon as we contemplated it, and then more when we saw its effects, and then even as we wrote of it, filled us with revulsion," he writes. He considers the thousands of American soldiers who might have perished in a full-scale invasion of Japan. He questions the use of the second bomb on Nagasaki. "We could only hope that reasons based on morality as well as strategy dictated the decision," he writes.

== Awards ==
While at Yale, he received the Francis Gilman Blake award for teaching excellence from the graduating class. At the University of California he received the teaching award for excellence from the graduating class in 2 of his 7 active years.

== Select publications ==
Liebow authored many of the seminal books on pulmonary diseases. He also published papers on sclerosing pneumocytoma, pulmonary alveolar proteinosis, meningothelial-like nodules, pulmonary hypertension, pulmonary veno-occlusive disease, lymphomatoid granulomatosis, pulmonary Langerhans cell histiocytosis, pulmonary epithelioid hemangioendothelioma and pulmonary hyalinizing granuloma. Among his published works are:

- Liebow, A. A. (1949). Pathology of atomic bomb casualties. Ann Arbor.
- Liebow, A. A. (1952). Tumors of the lower respiratory tract. Washington: Armed Forces Institute of Pathology.
- Lindskog, G. E., & Liebow, A. A. (1953). Thoracic surgery and related pathology. New York: Appleton-Century-Crofts.
- Liebow, A. A., & Hubbell, D. S. (1956). Sclerosing hemangioma (histiocytoma, xanthoma) of the lung. Cancer, 9(1), 53–75.
- Rosen, S. H., Castleman, B., Liebow, A. A., Enzinger, F. M., & Hunt, R. T. (1958). Pulmonary alveolar proteinosis. New England Journal of Medicine, 258(23), 1123–1142.
- Carrington, C. B., & Liebow, A. A. (1966). Limited forms of angiitis and granulomatosis of Wegener's type. The American journal of medicine, 41(4), 497–527.
- Liebow, A. A., & In Smith, D. E. (1968). The Lung. Baltimore, Md: Williams & Wilkins.
- Spencer, H., & Liebow, A. A. (1968). Pathology of the lung <excluding pulmonary tuberculosis>. Oxford, Braunschweig: Pergamon Pr.
- Liebow A. A., & Carrington D. B. The interstitial pneumonias. In: Simon M, Potchen EJ, LeMay M, editors. Frontiers of pulmonary radiology. New York: Grune & Stratteon. (1969) pp. 102–141.
- Liebow, A. A. (1970). Encounter with disaster: A medical diary of Hiroshima, 1945. New York: Norton.
- Liebow, A. A. (1972). Lymphomatoid granulomatosis. California medicine, 116(5), 48.
- Bahadori, M., & Liebow, A. A. (1973). Plasma cell granulomas of the lung. Cancer, 31(1), 191–208.
- Liebow, A. A. (1973). The J. Burns Amberson lecture—pulmonary angiitis and granulomatosis. American Review of Respiratory Disease, 108(1), 1–18.
- Glenn, W. W. L., Liebow, A. A., & Lindskog, G. E. (1975). Thoracic and cardiovascular surgery with related pathology. New York: Appleton-Century-Crofts.
- Corrin, B., Liebow, A. A., & Friedman, P. J. (1975). Pulmonary lymphangiomyomatosis. A review. The American journal of pathology, 79(2), 348.
- Katzenstein, A. L. A., Carrington, C. B., & Liebow, A. A. (1979). Lymphomatoid granulomatosis. A clinicopathologic study of 152 cases. Cancer, 43(1), 360–373.
- Bloor, C. M., & Liebow, A. A. (1980). The pulmonary and bronchial circulations in congenital heart disease. New York: Plenum Medical Book Co.
