= Martin Price =

Martin Price may refer to:

- Martin Price (numismatist) (1939–1995), British numismatist
- Martin Price (critic), scholar of Augustan literature and Sterling Professor of English at Yale University
- Martin Price, musician in 808 State
- Martin Price, a character in The Muppets Take Manhattan
- Martin Price, a character in the 2011 film Abduction
