= William Thompson Bacon =

American poet

- Born: August 24, 1812; Woodbury, Connecticut, U.S.
- Died: May 18, 1881 (age 68); Derby, Connecticut, U.S.
- Occupations: Congregational minister, writer, editor, educator
- Relatives: Jonathan Knight (father-in-law)

William Thompson Bacon (August 24, 1812 – May 18, 1881) was an American minister, editor, educator, and writer, based in Connecticut.

== Early life and education ==
Bacon, son of Daniel and Rebecca (Thompson) Bacon, was born in Woodbury, Connecticut. He entered Yale College at the age of 21, after having spent several years in mercantile life, and graduated in 1837. After graduation, he studied theology in the Yale Divinity School for three years, and was ordained the pastor of the Congregational Church in Trumbull, Connecticut, on December 28, 1842, which he resigned from on account of ill health in 1844.

== Career ==
From 1845 to 1846 Bacon edited the New Englander, a quarterly magazine published in New Haven, and he helped to establish the New Haven Morning Journal and Courier, which he edited until 1849. For the next year or two he supplied the pulpit of the Congregational Church in South Britain, a parish of Southbury, Connecticut. From 1853 to 1854, supplied his old church in Trumbull, while residing in the family homestead in Woodbury. He also conducted a boarding and day school in Woodbury for some years. In 1866 he removed to Derby, Connecticut, and became proprietor and editor of the Derby Transcript, a weekly newspaper.

His literary tastes were already marked while in college. He was, if not the earliest to suggest, one of the most earnest supporters of the Yale Literary Magazine, and served on the magazine's the first board of editors. He published three volumes of poems, the first in 1838. "To delight and elevate the mind, and thus to refine it," he wrote in 1840, "is the office and end of true poetry."

== Publications ==
- Poems (1838, 1840)
- Poems (1848)

== Personal life ==
On August 7, 1839, Bacon married Elizabeth A. Knight, eldest daughter of Jonathan Knight, professor of Anatomy and Surgery in Yale College, who survived him with five sons and two daughters. One daughter and one son died before him. Bacon dealt with dyspepsia and erysipelas for much of his life; he died after a week's illness, in Derby, May 18, 1881, aged nearly 69 years.
