= Madeline Stanton =

American secretary and librarian (1898–1980)

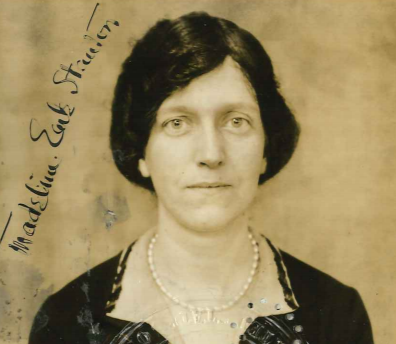
Stanton's passport photograph

Madeline Earle Stanton (June 9, 1898 – October 25, 1980) was a personal secretary to American neurosurgeon Harvey Cushing. She served as librarian of the Medical Historical Library at Yale University from 1949 to 1968.

A native of Canton, Massachusetts, Stanton was a cum laude graduate of Smith College. Before entering Cushing's service, she worked as a secretary to Agide Jacchia, the conductor of the Boston Pops Orchestra.

Stanton began working for Cushing in 1920, during his time at Harvard and the Peter Bent Brigham Hospital in Boston. In 1933, Stanton accompanied Cushing to New Haven, where he had accepted an appointment as Sterling Professor of Neurology at Yale. Stanton also accompanied Cushing abroad. On a trip to Britain and mainland Europe, Stanton helped Cushing complete his unfinished speeches and acted as a travel companion for his daughter Betsey.

When Cushing's rare books, along with the collections of John F. Fulton and Arnold C. Klebs, were brought together to form Yale's Medical Historical Library, Stanton played a major role in organizing the collections of the new library. In 1939, Stanton was appointed Secretary of the Historical Library. In 1949, her title was changed to Librarian of the Historical Collections, and on her retirement in 1968 she was appointed historical consultant. From 1951 to 1961 she was also research assistant in bibliography in the Yale Department of the History of Medicine. She was an assistant editor of the Journal of the History of Medicine and Allied Sciences from 1948 to 1960 and from 1961 to 1972 associate editor.

== Publications ==
- Fulton, John F. and Madeleine E. Stanton. The centennial of surgical anesthesia: an annotated catalogue of books and pamphlets bearing on the early history of surgical anesthesia, exhibited at the Yale Medical Library, October 1946. New York: Henry Schuman, 1946.
- Fulton, John F., and Madeline E. Stanton. Michael Servetus, humanist and martyr. New York, 1953.
- Fulton, John F. and Madeleine E. Stanton. "Bibliography of Galvani's writings on animal electricity," in Luigi Galvani, Commentary on the effects of electricity on muscular motion...together with a facsimile of Galvani's De viribus electricitatis in motu musculari commentarius (1791), and a bibliography of the editions and translations of Galvani's book... Norwalk, CT: Burndy Library, 1954, pp. 159–171.
- Fulton, John F., Frederick G. Kilgour, and Madeline E. Stanton, "Die Medizinische Bibliothek der Universität Yale,” Zeitschrift der Schweizerischen Bibliophilen Gesellschaft 2 (2) (1959): 87–102.
- Fulton, John F., Frederick G. Kilgour and Madeline E. Stanton. Yale Medical Library: the formation and growth of its Historical Library. New Haven, 1962.

== Bibliography ==
- "A gathering of friends in memory of Madeline Earle Stanton, (1898-1980), held in the Historical Library, Yale University School of Medicine, Saturday, 22 November 1980," Journal of the History of Medicine and Allied Sciences, 36 (1981): 129–150.
- Blankfort, Joelle Ruth. “Madeline Earle Stanton and the Historical Library of the Yale Medical Library,” M.S. Thesis in Library Science, Southern Connecticut State College, 1976.
- Wilson, L. G. "Madeline Earle Stanton 1898-1980." Bulletin of the Medical Library Association 69.3 (1981): 357.

== See also ==
- Harvey Cushing
