= John Farquhar Fulton =

American neurophysiologist and historian of science (1899–1960)

- Fulton in 1946
- Born: November 1, 1899; Saint Paul, Minnesota, U.S.
- Died: May 29, 1960 (aged 60); Hamden, Connecticut, U.S.
- Education: Magdalen College, Oxford
- Scientific career
- Fields: Neurophysiology, History of Science, aviation medicine
- Workplaces: Yale University
- Doctoral students: Hsiang-Tung Chang

John Farquhar Fulton (November 1, 1899 – May 29, 1960) was an American neurophysiologist and historian of science. He received numerous degrees from Oxford University and Harvard University. He taught at Magdalen College School of Medicine at Oxford and later became the youngest Sterling Professor of Physiology at Yale University. His main contributions were in primate neurophysiology and history of science.

== Early life and education ==
John Farquhar Fulton was born in Saint Paul, Minnesota, as the youngest of six children to Edith Stanley Wheaton and John Farquhar Fulton, an ophthalmologist who helped found the University of Minnesota. He studied at the University of Minnesota from 1917 to 1918 and then transferred to Harvard University, receiving a B.S. in 1921. Starting in 1921, he studied neurophysiology at Magdalen College, Oxford, as a Rhodes Scholar, earning a B.A. with first class honors in 1923. Then, as a Christopher Welch Scholar at Magdalen College, he received an M.A. and a D.Phil. in 1925. He then received an M.D. from Harvard in 1927. After his time at Harvard, he focused his studies on neurosurgery at the Peter Bent Brigham Hospital in Boston under Harvey Cushing. He later returned to Oxford to receive a D.Sc. in 1941 and D.Litt. in 1957. He was hospitalized for diabetes mellitus in 1950 and for cardiac difficulties in 1957. He died at the age of 60 due to heart failure.

== Leadership ==
Fulton taught as a demonstrator in physiology for two years at Oxford University starting in 1923. He taught briefly at the Magdalen College School of Medicine from 1928 to 1929, then transferred to Yale University, becoming the youngest Sterling Professor of Physiology.

His leadership extended outside the classroom. His positions included editor for the Journal of Neurophysiology; creator of the Yale Aeromedical Research Unit in 1940; chairman of the Subcommittee on Historical Records of the National Research Council, member of the Committee on Aviation Medicine; trustee for the Institute for Advanced Study in Princeton, New Jersey in 1942; president of the History of Science Society from 1947 to 1950; first chairman of the Yale Department of History and Medicine in 1951, along with Harvey Williams Cushing and Arnold Klebs, and head of the Journal of the History of Medicine and Allied Sciences from 1951 to 1960.

== Contributions ==
=== History of science ===
Fulton strongly encouraged the addition of humanities into the scientific fields by placing the history of sciences into general education. His passion for this topic landed him the role of president of the History of Science Society from 1947 to 1950. He aided in the founding of institutions such as the Medical Historical Library at Yale (1941), the Logan Clendening Lectures in the History of Medicine at the University of Kansas in 1950, the Yale Department of History of Medicine (with Harvey Williams Cushing and Arnold Klebs in 1951), and the Yale Department of the History of Science and Medicine in 1959. Madeline Stanton, who was Librarian of the Historical Collections at the Medical Historical Library at Yale, was also a frequent co-author with Fulton on works regarding history of science and organization of sources on the same topic.

During his time as president of the History of Science Society, he was a member of the editorial board of its historical journal Isis and helped stabilize it so it could grow in popularity. He also organized meetings in 1947 for the Committee on the History of Science in General Education, which created a project to collect materials to use in the teaching of history of science.

He argued for the English translation of historical texts that traced the history of the sciences. He had a hobby as an avid book collector, and he donated much of his collection to the Yale Medical Historical Library. He also added his own work to these collections. He wrote biographies for Harvey Cushing, Benjamin Silliman, Robert Boyle, Girolamo Fracastoro, Richard Lower, John Mayow, Kenelm Digby, and Joseph Priestley. Fulton also discovered early publications of Ambroise Paré, a surgeon who lived in the 16th century.

=== Primate physiology ===
Fulton created the first primate research laboratory in the United States. Through the 1930s, he and other scientists did comparative studies on functional localization in the cerebral cortex. They found that lesioning the prefrontal cortex created calming effects in the monkeys. Fulton proposed, but did not implement, the idea of using this technique on humans to relieve mental diseases. Fulton's team's findings influenced Portuguese neurologist Egas Moniz, who developed the medical practice of the frontal lobotomy in humans and who won the Nobel Prize for his work in 1949.

Fulton's work in the field of neurophysiology brought about the creation of the Journal of Neurophysiology in 1938.

=== World War II ===
The impact of Fulton's studies in neurophysiology extended to the military during World War II. Fulton created the Yale Aero-Medical Research Unit, which lasted from 1940 to 1951. It made great progress in the fields of aviation medicine as well as high-altitude flying, which caused Fulton to be awarded various honors (below).

== Awards and honors ==
- Honorary officer of the Order of the British Empire, Civil Division
- Officier of the French Legion of Honour
- Commander of the Order of Leopold of Belgium
- 1934 elected to the American Academy of Arts and Sciences
- 1949 elected to the American Philosophical Society
- 1955 John Fulton Medal from the Society for the History of Medical Science
- 1958 George Sarton Medal from the History of Science Society for "outstanding contributions in the history of science"
- 1997 elected to the United States National Academy of Sciences

== Publications ==
Books

- Fulton, J. F. (1926) Muscular Contraction and the Reflex Control of Movement. Williams & Wilkins, Baltimore.
- Fulton, J. F. (1930) Selected Readings in the History of Physiology. Charles C. Thomas, Baltimore.
- Fulton, J. F. (1938) Physiology of the Nervous System. Oxford University Press, London.
- Fulton, J. F. (1944) A Visit to Le Puy-en-Velay by Harvey Cushing. The Rowfant Club, Cleveland.
- Fulton, J. F. (1946) Harvey Cushing: A Biography. Charles Thomas, Springfield.
- Fulton, John F. and Madeleine E. Stanton (1946)The centennial of surgical anesthesia: an annotated catalogue of books and pamphlets bearing on the early history of surgical anesthesia, exhibited at the Yale Medical Library, October 1946. New York: Henry Schuman,
- Fulton, J. F. & Thomson, E. H. (1947) Benjamin Silliman, 1779-1864, Pathfinder in American Science. Schuman, New York.
- Fulton, J. F. (1949) Functional Localization in the Frontal Lobes and Cerebellum. Clarendon Press, Oxford.
- Fulton, J. F. (1951) Frontal Lobotomy and Affective Behavior: A Neurological Analysis. W. W. Norton, New York.
- Fulton, J. F. (Ed) (1951) Decompression Sickness, Caisson Sickness, Divers and Fliers Bends and Related Syndromes. Saunders, Philadelphia.
- Fulton, J. F. (1951) The Great Medical Bibliographers. A Study in Humanism. University of Pennsylvania Press, Philadelphia.
- Fulton, John F., and Madeline E. Stanton (1953) Michael Servetus, humanist and martyr. New York.
- Fulton, John F. and Madeleine E. Stanton (1954) "Bibliography of Galvani's writings on animal electricity," in Luigi Galvani, Commentary on the effects of electricity on muscular motion...together with a facsimile of Galvani's De viribus electricitatis in motu musculari commentarius (1791), and a bibliography of the editions and translations of Galvani's book... Norwalk, CT: Burndy Library, pp. 159–171.
- Fulton, John F., Frederick G. Kilgour and Madeline E. Stanton (1962) Yale Medical Library: the formation and growth of its Historical Library. New Haven.

Articles

- Fulton, J. F. "Robert Boyle and His Influence on Thought in the Seventeenth Century," Isis, 1932, 18:77-102.
- Fulton, J. F. "A Bibliography of the Honourable Robert Boyle," Proceedings of the Oxford Bibliographical Society, 1932, 3:1-172.
- Fulton, J. F. & Kennard, M. "A study of flaccid and spastic paralysis produced by lesions of the cerebral cortex in primates," Proc Ass Res Nerv Ment Dis, 1932, 13:158-210.
- Fulton, J. F. "The Centenary of the Sheffield Scientific School," Isis, 1947, 38:100-101.
- Fulton, J. F. "The History of Science at Cornell University," Isis, 1947, 38:99.
- Fulton, J. F. "Physiological Basis Frontal Lobotomy," Acta Medica Scandinavica, suppl., 1947, 196:617-625.
- Fulton, J. F. "The Surgical Approach to Mental Disorder," McGill Medical Journal, 1948, 17:133-145.
- Fulton, J. F., Frederick G. Kilgour, and Madeline E. Stanton, "Die Medizinische Bibliothek der Universität Yale,” Zeitschrift der Schweizerischen Bibliophilen Gesellschaft 2 (2) (1959): 87–102.

Other

- Fulton, J. F. (1926) Muscular contraction and the reflex control of movement. Doctorate thesis. Baltimore, Williams & Wilkins.
- Fulton, J. F. "The Needs of Historians of Science" (read at the Conference on the Place of Science in General Education, Harvard University, Cambridge, Massachusetts, on 9 July 1949), p. 1, "Conant – Conference on Science in General Education," BSh86, Richard Harrison Shryock Papers, American Philosophical Society.
