= Gerhard Giebisch =

American physician (1927–2020)

Gerhard Giebisch (1927 – April 6, 2020) was a cellular and molecular physiologist and a Sterling Professor emeritus at Yale School of Medicine. He held an M.D. degree from the University of Vienna which he got in 1951. He died on April 6, 2020, aged 93.
