= Charles Hooker (physician) =

American academic and physician

- Born: March 22, 1799; Berlin, Connecticut
- Died: March 19, 1863 (aged 63); New Haven, Connecticut
- Education: Yale College
- Occupations: Professor of Anatomy and Physiology at Yale College

Charles Hooker (March 22, 1799 – March 19, 1863) was a medical doctor and a professor at the Yale School of Medicine.

He was son of William and Hannah Hooker, was a native of Berlin, Connecticut, and a descendant of Thomas Hooker, the first minister of Hartford, Connecticut.

He graduated from Yale College in 1820. He pursued his medical studies at Yale, where he graduated in 1823. He immediately began the practice of his profession in this city, which he followed with constancy and success, during a period of forty years.

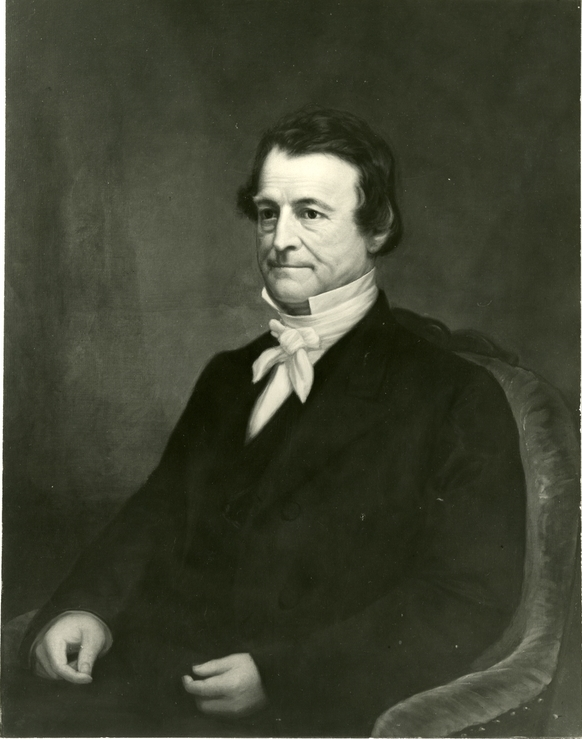
Charles Hooker, posthumous portrait by Ulysses Dow Tenney in 1873

In 1838, he was appointed Professor of Anatomy and Physiology in Yale College, and he discharged the duties of this post until his death, acting also as Dean of the medical faculty. He took an active part in public affairs related to his profession and was interested especially in the management of the Connecticut State Hospital, in which he was a Director and one of the attending physicians from the time of its foundation. He was the author of various medical essays, which were printed.

He was married in 1823 to Miss Eliza Beers.

He died in New Haven, March 19, 1863, aged 63 years.

== Publications ==
- Two Cases of Abscess in the Lungs from Foreign Substances in the Trachea (1833)
- Cases of Cholera (1833)
- On the Properties and Proximate Principles of the Ergot: (Acinula Clavus, of Fries) (1834)
- Cases of Uterine Hydatids (1837)
- Case of Poisoning with Datura Stramonium: Showing the Uncertainty of Circumstantial Evidence in Medico-Legal Investigations (1836)
- An Essay On Intestinal Auscultation (1847)

Charles Hooker's work was mainly published and printed in The Boston Medical & Surgical Journal.
