= Cyril Norman Hugh Long =

British-American chemist

- Born: June 19, 1901
- Died: July 6, 1970 (aged 69)
- Scientific career
- Fields: biochemistry
- Institutions: Yale University

Cyril Norman Hugh Long (June 19, 1901 – July 6, 1970) was an English-American biochemist and academic administrator. He was Sterling Professor of physiological chemistry at Yale University for 31 years during the middle part of the 20th century.

== Background ==
Cyril Long was born in Burton, Nettleton, Wiltshire, the first of two sons of John Edward Long and Rose Fanny Long, née Langward. As a young man, he did not plan to study to become a scientist. He instead experimented with diverse areas such as perfume making and working with wood. Long devoted much of his time to literature and history. As a child he enjoyed playing soccer and cricket and many times his father needed to remind him to come back home to study. He always performed well during his school years and was ranked among the best of his graduating class. He appeared to have a natural talent for chemistry and once said, "I was attracted from an early age to chemistry, largely by my own fortunate contact in an English school with a science master ... whose ways of teaching it was so effective that a large number of his students have become scientists".

Long studied organic chemistry under Robert Robinson and Arthur Lapworth at the University of Manchester, where he received his BSc. Shortly after his graduation in 1921, he began assisting Nobel laureate A. V. Hill in his work on the biophysics of muscle contraction. After working for two years at University College London, Long sailed on 4 September 1925 on the RMS Aurania from Liverpool to Quebec, to work in Montreal with Jonathan Meakins at McGill University; he received his M.D. there in 1928. He served as director of the George S. Cox Medical Research Institute, a diabetes research center at the University of Pennsylvania. In 1936, Long moved to the School of Medicine. At Yale, he was Director of the Division of Biological Sciences (1939–42), Dean of the School of Medicine (1947–52), and Chair of Physiology (1951–64).

In the 1930s and 1940s Long and Abraham White worked together in the Yale Medical Center. As a result of their and Hubert R Catchpole's work in 1937 they isolated bovine prolactin, the first of the protein pituitary hormones to be obtained in pure crystalline form. Later, they isolated different hormones, and later characterized and sequenced many of them, greatly contributing to modern biochemistry. Long mainly worked with the hormones of the pituitary gland and adrenal extracts of the metabolism; his major research goal was to find a cure for diabetes.

Long was elected to the United States National Academy of Sciences in 1948 and a member of both the American Philosophical Society and the American Academy of Arts and Sciences in 1949.

Long married Hilda Gertrude Jarman in Kerrisdale, Vancouver on 28 July 1928., and they had two daughters: Diana Elizabeth Long (Diana Long Hall), a historian of science and medicine, and Barbara Rosemary Long.

Long was naturalised on 1 July 1942, and Hilda on 19 November 1948, while they were living at 100 Old Farm Road, Hamden, Connecticut.

Cyril Norman Hugh Long died on 6 July 1970, aged 69. Hilda died on 16 October 1988, aged 76. They are both buried at Grove Street Cemetery, New Haven, Connecticut.
