= Jonathan Knight (physician) =

American physician

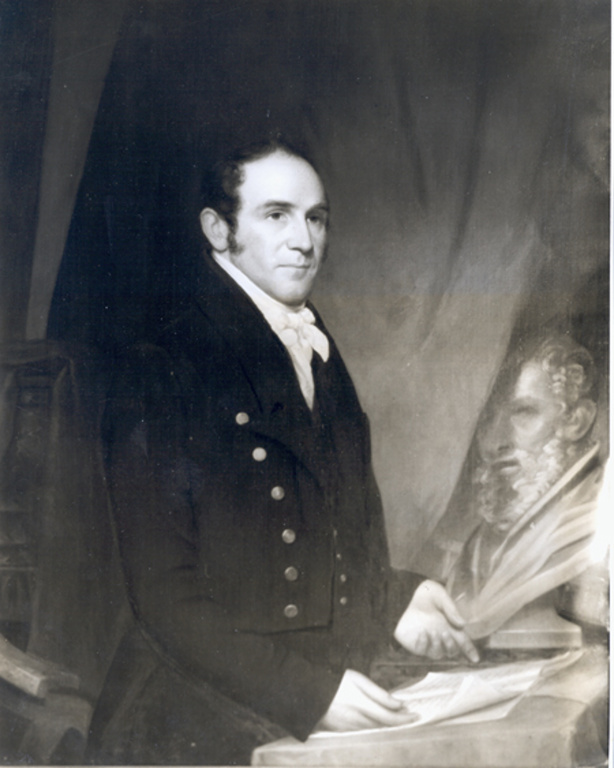
Jonathan Knight painted by Nathaniel Jocelyn, 1827

Coat of Arms of Jonathan Knight

Jonathan Knight (September 4, 1789 – August 25, 1864) was an American medical doctor and founding professor of the Yale Medical School.

== Early life and education ==
He was a son of Dr. Jonathan Knight, a Surgeon's mate in the Continental Army, and was born in Norwalk, Connecticut. His mother was a daughter of Dr. Asahel Fitch, of Reading, Connecticut.

He graduated from Yale College in 1808. For two years after graduation he taught school in Norwich and New London, Connecticut and was next a Tutor in Yale College for one year. He then attended two annual courses of medical lectures in the University of Pennsylvania, having already been licensed to practice, by the Connecticut Medical Society, in August, 1811. He received the honorary degree of M.D. from Yale College in 1818.

== Career ==
The Medical Institution of Yale College was organized in 1813, and he was appointed its first Professor of Anatomy and Physiology. He continued in this post for twenty-five years, when he was transferred to the Chair of Surgery. After having lectured for more than fifty years to successive classes of students, he resigned all connection with the college, in May, 1864. For many years, in addition to his duties in the medical school, he lectured on Anatomy and Physiology to the Senior class in the Academical Department. During all his residence in New Haven, Connecticut he was engaged in extensive practice. He was President in 1846 and 1847 of the Convention which formed the American Medical Association, and was also President of the Association itself in 1853.

== Death and legacy ==
He died in New Haven, aged 74 years. A funeral discourse by Rev. Dr. Bacon, and a commemorative sketch by Prof. F Bacon, M. D., were printed.

At the time of his death he was President of the American Mutual Life Insurance Company. The Knight Hospital of the U.S. Government in New Haven, now the Yale–New Haven Hospital, was named in his honor.
