= Ruth Yeazell =

American literary critic (born 1947)

Ruth Bernard Yeazell (born April 4, 1947) is an American literary critic.

Ruth Bernard Yeazell was born on April 4, 1947, in New York City. She graduated from Swarthmore College in 1967, then attended Yale University. Yeazell taught at the University of California, Los Angeles, and Boston University before returning to Yale in 1991, where she was named the Chace Family Professor of English. Yeazell was awarded a Guggenheim Fellowship in 1979, and granted membership into the American Academy of Arts and Sciences in 2009. As of 2018, she is the Sterling Professor of English at Yale, the highest honor bestowed on Yale faculty.

She contributes to The Conversation, The New York Review of Books, and the London Review of Books.
