= G. D. Hsiung =

Virologist

Gueh-Djen (Edith) Hsiung
- Born: September 16, 1918; Hubei, China
- Died: August 20, 2006 (aged 87); Branford, Connecticut
- Education: Ginling College; Michigan State University
- Occupation: Virologist
- Known for: Diagnostic virology

Gueh-Djen (Edith) Hsiung was a virologist and professor emeritus of laboratory medicine. She was one of the first women to achieve the rank of professor at the Yale School of Medicine.

== Early life ==
Hsiung was born on September 16, 1918, in Hubei, China. She graduated with a degree in biology from Ginling College in Chengdu, where she majored in pre-medical studies and biology from 1938 to 1942. She planned to go to medical school, but her opportunity was lost when Peking Union Medical College closed during World War II. Instead, Hsiung secured a job testing bacterial and viral vaccines for use in animals at the Epizootic Prevention Bureau of the Ministry of Public Health in Lanzhou.

== Career ==
In 1947, Hsiung came to the United States and entered study at Michigan State University. She obtained her master's degree in bacteriology and then underwent day-long surgery to fuse a congenitally dislocated hip, spending the next nine months in a total body cast. She returned to school in 1949 and obtained her Ph.D. in microbiology in 1951, distinguished with honors.

In order to pay her medical expenses, Hsiung worked for the next two years at the Wene Poultry Laboratory in New Jersey, where she developed the first vaccine for infectious bronchitis virus in chickens.

In 1953, she came to work in the Department of Microbiology with the hope of developing an improved vaccine for tuberculosis. Still pursuing her goal of attending medical school in the United States, she was turned down by Yale because she, at age 35, was considered too old. Like many women in science at that time, she took a position as a postdoctoral fellow, which paid a much-needed stipend. During her fellowship she worked under Joseph L. Melnick on poliovirus and related enteroviruses. In Melnick’s lab, she met and collaborated with Dorothy M. Horstmann, a leader in polio research and the first woman to become a full professor at the School of Medicine in 1961.

In 1960, she was appointed the first director of the Virology Laboratory at Grace-New Haven Hospital, Yale New Haven Hospital’s predecessor. In 1967, she became chief of the Virology Research Laboratory at the Veterans Administration Medical Center in West Haven and a professor in the Department of Laboratory Medicine at Yale.

In 1984, she established the National Virology Reference Laboratory at the Veterans Administration Medical Center (VAMC) in West Haven, Connecticut, to serve VA hospitals nationwide, and became its first director This laboratory was created to provide viral diagnostic services to VAMCs in the Northeast and beyond, and to research new methods of rapid viral diagnosis. VA hospitals nationwide were able to send frozen virus specimens overnight to Hsiung in West Haven, and receive a diagnosis within 24 hours. In 1987, the reference laboratory was enlarged to include a Retrovirus Diagnostic Section.

From 1992 to 1998, Hsiung traveled annually to the National Cheng Kung University in Taiwan to help establish a model virology laboratory in its Department of Pathology. This laboratory has since played an important role in diagnosing serious viral infections in the region, such as severe acute respiratory syndrome and avian influenza.

== Contributions ==
Hsiung developed new laboratory methods of cell culture in order to find, identify, and study the behavior of viruses. She developed animal models, especially the guinea pig, to study viral pathogenesis and test treatments by antivirals. Her demonstration of transplacental transmission of cytomegalovirus (CMV) in the guinea pig correlated with congenital CMV in humans and provided an important model for this infection. In the late 1980s and early 1990s, she worked on antivirals for human immunodeficiency virus (HIV).

Hsiung was the first to describe the use of plaque morphology and a spectrum of cell cultures for recognition and characterization of the poliovirus, coxsackievirus and echoviruses. This work also revealed that echovirus-10 had distinct characteristics and should be removed from the enterovirus group; it was later reclassified as a reovirus. Hsiung was the first to isolate SV40 in cell culture and to recognize the intranuclear inclusions produced by it. She found that X-irradiation of monkey cells accelerated the appearance of latent viruses and recognized the importance of endogenous viruses in cell cultures derived from a variety of animal species. The isolation by Hsiung of a parainfluenza virus serologically related to SV5, the DA myxovirus, from human blood and the demonstration of its etiologic and biologic similarity to related paramyxoviruses, was of particular significance, as was her finding that these viruses can persist in various tissues other than the respiratory tract. Hsiung was the first to demonstrate guinea pig retrovirus in cell cultures derived from normal guinea pigs by using BUDR induction, as well as to demonstrate the presence of retrovirus in the placenta and fetal tissues of normal guinea pigs. Her studies of latent herpesviruses in the guinea pig led to the discovery of a lymphotropic herpesvirus and to the finding of long-term persistence of this virus in leukocytes as well as in various other tissues of infected animals without apparent disease. She worked extensively on the pathogenesis and treatment of herpesvirus infections, including genital herpes latency, in both normal and immunocompromised guinea pigs, and her long-standing interest in the morphogenesis of viral infections included the human immunodeficiency virus.

Hsiung was a dedicated mentor to generations of trainees, both at Yale and in China and Taiwan.

As a spokesperson for accurate viral diagnosis, she had a dramatic influence on the recognition of viruses as etiologic agents of human disease.

She continued her virology work even into her early 80s and died at 87 of cancer on August 20, 2006, at Connecticut Hospice in Branford, Connecticut.

== Select publications ==
Hsiung wrote the textbook Diagnostic Virology (1964) that became a standard in the field. She also published a scientific autobiography, Mysteries and Miracles, in 1995. During her career, Hsiung also published more than 240 papers on diagnostic virology.

Among her publications are:

- Hsiung, G. D., & Fong, C. K. Y. (1982). Diagnostic virology: Illustrated by light and electron microscopy. New Haven: Yale University Press.
- Hsiung, G. D., Fong, C. K. Y., & Landry, M. L. (1994). Hsiung's diagnostic virology: As illustrated by light and electron microscopy. New Haven: Yale University Press.
- Hsiung, G. D., & Henderson, J. R. (1964). Diagnostic virology: By G.D. Hsiung, in collaboration with J.R. Henderson. New Haven: Yale Univ. Press.
- Seligson, D., Hsiung, G. D., & Green, R. H. (1978). Virology and rickettsiology. West Palm Beach, Fla: CRC Press.

== Awards ==
Hsiung received many awards and honors, including the Becton-Dickinson Award in Clinical Microbiology from the American Society for Microbiology, the Wellcome Diagnostic Award from the Pan American Group for Rapid Viral Diagnosis. In 1989, friends and colleagues established the G.D. Hsiung, Ph.D., Student Research Fellowship Fund. The Pan American Society for Clinical Virology gives an award each year in her honor.

In 1989, she received an Honorary Doctor of Science degree from Michigan State University.

She received her honorary professorship in virology first from Hubei Medical University in 1982 and several others later from Chinese Academy of Medical Science, Tianjin Medical University, etc.

She was a fellow of the American Academy of Microbiology and the Infectious Diseases Society of America, and a member of the American Society for Microbiology, the New York Academy of Sciences, the American Association of Immunologists, the Society for Experimental Biology and Medicine, the Tissue Culture Association, the Pan American Group for Rapid Viral Diagnosis, and is a charter member of the American Society of Virology.
