= Roberta Romano =

Yale Law Professor

Roberta Romano is Sterling Professor of Law at the Yale Law School. She is the first woman at Yale Law School to be named a Sterling Professor. Roberta Romano joined the Yale Law School faculty as a professor of law in 1985. She was named the Allen Duffy/Class of 1960 Professor of Law in 1991 and the Oscar M. Ruebhausen Professor of Law in 2005. She is Director of the Yale Law School Center for the Study of Corporate Law and Professor (by courtesy) at the Yale School of Management.

== Life ==
She holds a B.A. from the University of Rochester, an M.A. from the University of Chicago, and a J.D. from Yale Law School.

== Research ==
Her research has focused on state competition for corporate charters, the political economy of takeover regulation, shareholder litigation, institutional investor activism in corporate governance, and the regulation of financial instruments and securities markets.

In addition to numerous articles and papers, Professor Romano is the author of The Advantage of Competitive Federalism for Securities Regulation and The Genius of American Corporate Law and editor of Foundations of Corporate Law (2d ed.). She is a fellow of the American Academy of Arts and Sciences and the European Corporate Governance Institute; a research associate of the National Bureau for Economic Research; a past president of the American Law and Economics Association and the Society for Empirical Legal Studies; and a past co-editor of the Journal of Law, Economics, and Organization.
