= Yale Physician Associate Program =

Physician assistant program in the United States

The Yale Physician Associate program accepted its first class in 1971. The mission of the program is to educate individuals to become outstanding clinicians and to foster leaders who will serve their communities and advance the physician assistant (PA) profession. The program's founder, Dr. Alfred M. Sadler Jr., served as its first director in 1970. Yale School of Medicine maintains the only PA program named "Physician Associate" program instead of a "Physician Assistant" program in the United States, as it pre-dates the formation of the accreditation body and has elected to retain its original name. Note that despite the difference in name, graduates of the program will take the Physician Assistant National Certifying Exam and will be called a physician assistant when practicing.

== Academics ==
Completion of the 28 month curriculum results in award of a master's degree. The education is divided into two portions (a didactic and clinical phase). The faculty of the Yale School of Medicine provides the education, which is coordinated by the Physician Associate program core faculty. The didactic year includes clinical and basic sciences as well as courses in research methods, ethics and physical examination. The clinical phase is fifteen months in duration with thirteen one month rotations and two months for research. Yale University requires all graduates to complete an original thesis under the mentorship of the School of Medicine faculty. Many graduates have pursued this research topic through a Yale Downs fellowship. This fellowship provides the student with an opportunity to act out his/her ideas in an international underserved setting. The PA program offers a joint degree (MMSc/MPH) with the Yale School of Public Health.

In 2015 rankings by US News of the Best Physicians Assistant Program, Yale was ranked #20 with Midwestern University, Northeastern University, Rosalind Franklin University, and University of Southern California.

In 2013 James (Jim) Van Rhee began as program director after previously having that position at Northwestern University. This leadership change has ushered in an innovative era at the PA program with enhanced use of technology and problem based learning. In 2015 the program received national headline as they began development of a distance learning format for medical education. This program development has not been without controversy as alumni have expressed concern over increased enrollment and the merits of distance education. The development of this program is potentially delayed as the PA accreditation body identified class expansion occurred too recently for the Yale PA program.

== International ==
The PA program keeps with the Yale University global focus and encourages students to study internationally. The program currently has clinical sites in Uganda, Peru, Central America, and the UK. In recent years students have studied in five continents, and faculty are frequently consulted in the global development of PA and medical education.

== Admissions ==
Acceptance is extremely selective. The common application for PA schools is used by Yale. The PA program receives over 1000 applicants for approximately 40 seats.

== Alumni ==
Alumni have found their way into influential positions within the healthcare system. Many graduates are in leadership positions within medicine and beyond. Several past presidents of the AAPA are Yale PA Alumni.
