= Boris Bittker =

American lawyer and legal writer

- Born: Boris Irving Bittker; November 28, 1916; Rochester, New York, U.S.
- Died: September 8, 2005 (aged 88); New Haven, Connecticut, U.S.
- Education: Cornell University (BA); Yale University (LLB)

Academic work
- Discipline: Tax law
- Institutions: Yale Law School

Boris Irving Bittker (November 28, 1916 – September 8, 2005) was an American legal scholar. A professor at Yale Law School, he wrote textbooks and over one hundred articles on tax law.

Bittker was known as "the nation's preeminent authority on tax law".

== Early life and career ==
Born in Rochester, New York, Bittker attended Cornell University (class of 1938) and Yale Law School (class of 1941). After law school, Bittker clerked for Judge Jerome Frank of the United States Court of Appeals for the Second Circuit. From 1942 to 1943 Bittker worked as an attorney for the Lend-Lease Administration in Washington, D.C.

On May 24, 1943, he joined the United States Army. During the next two years Bittker fought and was wounded in World War II, receiving a Purple Heart. He served with the 42nd Infantry Division in France.

Returning from Europe, Bittker returned to government service, working for the Office of the Alien Property Custodian. Bittker reluctantly returned to his alma mater as an assistant professor in 1946. Eventually he gained tenure in 1951, became a Southmayd Professor in 1958, and Sterling Professor of Law in 1970. He retired in 1983.

In 1973, Bittker wrote The Case for Black Reparations, inspired by SNCC leader James Forman, who in 1969 interrupted a church service to demand reparations for slavery. Bittker defended the spirit of Forman's appeal, but argued that a reparations lawsuit for school segregation had a stronger legal basis.

Bittker was also a dedicated environmentalist, serving as a trustee of the Natural Resources Defense Council.

== Personal life ==
Bittker was married to Anne (died on February 2, 1997) and had two children, Susan and Daniel.

Boris Bittker died on September 8, 2005.

== Publications (selection) ==
- The Case for Black Reparations. Boston: Beacon Press. 1973. ISBN 9780394480947.
- Lokken, Lawrence (1981). Federal Taxation of Income, Estates and Gifts. Boston: Warren, Gorham & Lamont. ISBN 0-88262-460-1.
- Eustice, James (1987) [1959]. Federal Income Taxation of Corporations and Shareholders (5th ed.). Boston: Warren, Gorham & Lamont. ISBN 0-88712-991-9.
- "Constitutional Limits on the Taxing Power of the Federal Government". The Tax Lawyer. 41 (1): 3. 1987.
