= Brain Function Laboratory =

Laboratory at Yale University

The Brain Function Laboratory at Yale University School of Medicine "aims to understand the neural circuitry and fundamental mechanisms of the brain that enable human cognition, language, emotion, decision making, and perception in both healthy/typical individuals and patients with neurological, developmental, and psychiatric disorders."

The Brain Function Laboratory was established in 2013 at Yale University in 2013 under the direction of Joy Hirsch. This followed a transition from the fMRI Research Center within the Program for Imaging & Cognitive Sciences (PICS), which was directed by Lawrence Hirsch at Columbia University. In 2023, the lab published a paper in Imaging Neuroscience that found that neural activity was different when people were processing in-person versus online faces. In 2025, its director remained Joy Hirsch.
