= Bridgeport Hospital Milford Campus =

Coordinates: 41.217°N 73.0647°W

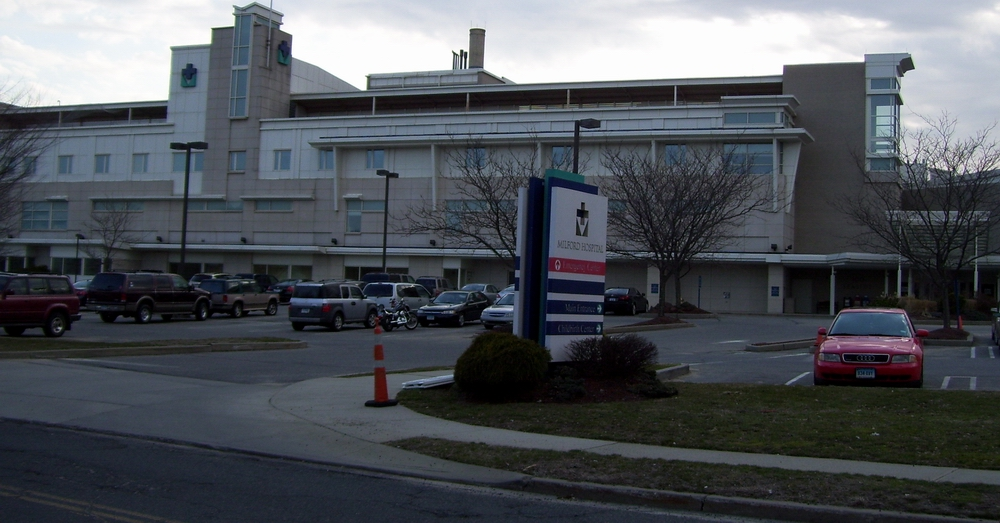

Geography
- Location: Milford, Connecticut, United States

Organization
- Care system: Private
- Funding: Non-profit hospital
- Type: Community, District, General, Specialist
- Affiliated university: Quinnipiac University
- Network: Yale New Haven Health System

Services
- Standards: Joint Commission
- Emergency department: Level III trauma center
- Beds: 106

Helipads
- Helipad: No

History
- Opened: 1920

Links
- Website: https://www.bridgeporthospital.org/locations/milford-300-seaside-avenue-campus.aspx
- Lists: Hospitals in Connecticut

Bridgeport Hospital Milford Campus is a not-for-profit hospital offering acute-care services, including ED, urgent care, joint replacement and wound care. It is located at 300 Seaside Avenue in Milford, Connecticut.

== Facilities ==
The Bridgeport Hospital Milford Campus is one of two campuses for Bridgeport Hospital, a non-profit 501-bed acute care hospital that is part of Yale New Haven Health. It specializes in emergency and walk-in services, joint replacement surgery, wound care, health education, and home care services.

In 2019, Milford Hospital became a part of the Yale New Haven Health System, and it is now referred to as Bridgeport Hospital Milford Campus. The hospital's main entrance is located at 300 Seaside Avenue, Milford, Connecticut.

Since then, there have been changes to the services provided and renovations. The Milford Campus is the only hospital in Greater New Haven to offer Mako^{®} Robotic Arm Assisted joint-replacement surgery. This cutting-edge technology allows surgeons to provide each patient with a personalized surgical experience based on their specific diagnosis and personal anatomy. The Center for Wound Healing and Hyperbaric Medicine is also a part of the Milford Campus and provides a comprehensive range of wound care services.
