= Arnold Klebs =

Swiss biologist (1870–1943)

Arnold C. Klebs
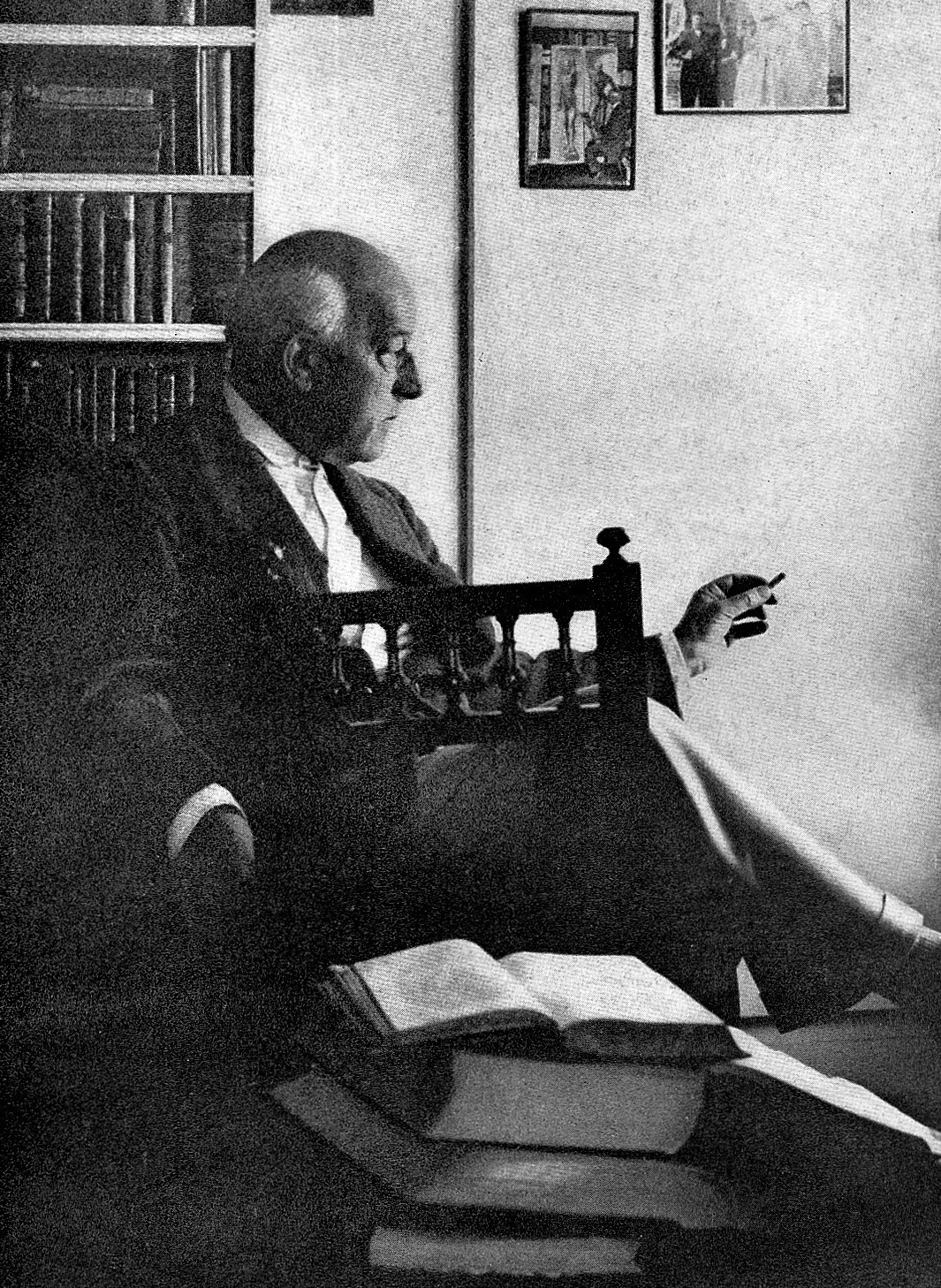
- Born: March 17, 1870; Bern, Switzerland
- Died: March 6, 1943 (aged 72); Nyon, Switzerland
- Education: University of Basel
- Known for: Work with Mycobacterium tuberculosis
- Scientific career
- Fields: Microbiology
- Workplaces: Johns Hopkins University; National Tuberculosis Institute

Arnold C. Klebs (March 17, 1870 – March 6, 1943) was a Swiss physician who specialized in the study of tuberculosis. Born in Bern, Switzerland, Arnold Klebs, the son of renowned bacteriologist Edwin Klebs, was raised in the presence of an extensive array of scientists, artists, and historians. In his teenage years, Klebs was one of Switzerland's pioneer bicycle racers.

Klebs received a medical degree from the University of Basel in 1896, then moved to the United States to practice medicine. Klebs worked with William Osler at Johns Hopkins University for a year after arriving in the U.S. and was a contemporary of William H. Welch. Following his work with Osler, he worked as a sanatorium director and tuberculosis specialist in Citronelle, Alabama and Chicago, Illinois. Given his long experience with the ailment, Klebs was named one of the first directors of the National Tuberculosis Institute.

In 1910, he returned to his native Switzerland and settled in a villa on Lake Geneva. In 1939, Klebs donated his collection of books to Harvey Cushing for its inclusion in what would become the Yale University's Harvey Cushing/John Hay Whitney Medical Library, where they were organized and curated by Madeline Stanton. These included incunabula, plague tracts, herbals, books and pamphlets on tuberculosis, and books on inoculation and vaccination. Klebs' library included 3000 texts related to tuberculosis alone.
