= Lawrence + Memorial Hospital =

- Yale New Haven Health System

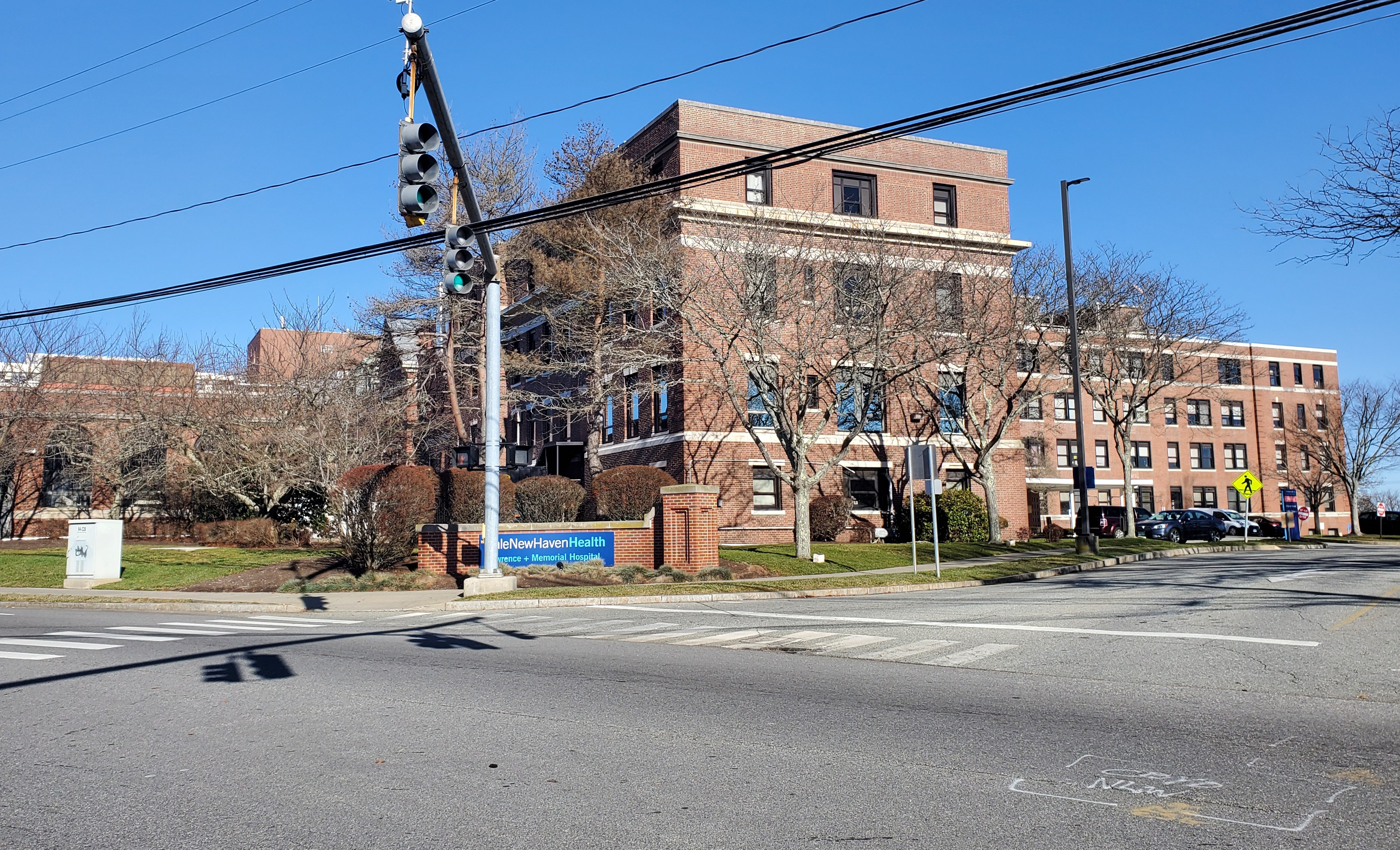
- Lawrence + Memorial Hospital in 2023

Geography
- Location: New London, Connecticut, United States
- Coordinates: 41.3369°N 72.1054°W

Organization
- Care system: Yale New Haven Health
- Type: General

Services
- Beds: 308 (250 staffed)

History
- Founded: 1912

Links
- Website: Official website
- Lists: Hospitals in Connecticut

Lawrence + Memorial Hospital is a private, not-for-profit hospital located in New London, Connecticut. It is affiliated with Yale New Haven Health System. The hospital has been serving its region since 1912, and joined the Yale New Haven Health System on September 8, 2016. Its primary regions include 10 towns along the Connecticut shoreline between Rhode Island and the Connecticut River and as far inland as Montville. The hospital is also a health care provider for Fishers Island, New York, Rhode Island, and other parts of eastern Connecticut.

Affiliates include the John Diabetes Center affiliate at Lawrence + Memorial – New London and Mystic, Center for Hospice Care, Community Partnerships for a healthy community, Visiting Nurses Association of Southeastern Connecticut, Lawrence + Memorial Medical Group and Occupational Rehabilitation.

During a fiscal year ending September 30, 2020, the hospital reported 12,609 inpatient discharges and 284,718 outpatient encounters. It employed 709 medical staff and 2,307 overall. During the fiscal year 2024, inpatient discharges went up to 13,175. Medical staff increased to 889, and total staff increased to 2,382.

== Services ==
The Lawrence + Memorial Hospital provides comprehensive diagnostic and therapeutic services to inpatients and outpatients, with particular expertise in Laboratory services, Diagnostic imaging, surgery, emergency care, cardiac care, physical therapy & rehabilitation. The Smilow Cancer Hospital Care Center in Waterford provides medical oncology services, gynecologic oncology and radiation oncology to area residents.

== See also ==
- Westerly Hospital
