= Truxton Trust =

- Type: Public
- Traded as: OTCID: TRUX
- Industry: Financial services
- Founder: Donald Thurmond, Thomas Stumb, Charles W. Cook Jr., Tom Snyder
- Headquarters: 20 Burton Hills Blvd, Nashville, Tennessee, United States
- Key people: Thomas Stumb (Chairman and CEO) Derrick Jones (President)
- Services: Wealth management, Private banking, Investment management, Asset management, Financial analysis, Commercial banking
- Revenue: ▲US$47.3 million (2024)
- Net income: ▲US$18.4 million (2024)
- AUM: ▲US$2 billion (2024)
- Total assets: ▲US$1 billion (2024)
- Number of employees: ▲82 (2025)
- Website: truxtontrust.com

Truxton Trust is a financial services firm headquartered in Nashville, Tennessee. Founded in 2004, it provides wealth management, private banking, investment management, financial analysis, and commercial banking to high-net-worth individuals, families, institutions, and organizations. It operates as a subsidiary of Truxton Corporation, which trades publicly under the ticker symbol OTCPK: TRUX. Truxton also maintains a wealth management office in Athens, Georgia.

== Truxton Capital Advisors ==
Launched in 2022, Truxton Capital Advisors services include succession planning, M&A advisory, debt refinancing, family governance, and integration into long-term family office strategy.

== History ==
Truxton Trust was organized in 2003 and opened for business in August 2004 under the name Nashville Bank and Trust, after raising $20 million in capital. The company was co-founded by Donald Thurmond, Thomas Stumb, Charles W. Cook Jr., and Tom Snyder. Mr. Thurmond, a Nashville banker, served as the founding Chairman and CEO until his death on December 8, 2009.

Charles W. Cook Jr. served as Vice Chairman and later Chairman before retiring on January 1, 2016. He was named Chairman Emeritus.

Andrew L. May joined the firm in 2010 as Chief Financial Officer, having previously served on the Board of Directors. He was promoted to President in 2016 and served in that role until 2023. In 2023, he transitioned to Vice Chairman.

Derrick A. Jones joined Truxton in 2004 and led the wealth management division. In 2022, he was appointed head of corporate development, and in 2023, he was named President and joined the Board of Directors.

== Headquarters and Offices ==
In 2024, Truxton Trust relocated its headquarters from the Belle Meade neighborhood to 20 Burton Hills Boulevard in Green Hills, Nashville, Tennessee.

The firm also maintains a regional wealth management office in Athens, Georgia.
