= Martin Price (critic) =

American literary critic and scholar

- Born: January 29, 1920; New York City, New York, U.S.
- Died: April 10, 2010 (aged 90); New Haven, Connecticut, U.S.
- Occupation: Literary critic
- Education: City College of New York (B.A.); University of Iowa (M.A.); Yale University (Ph.D.)

Martin Maximilian Price (January 29, 1920 – April 10, 2010) was an American literary critic and scholar who specialized in 18th-century English literature and thought.

Born in New York City, Price earned his bachelor's degree from City College of New York in 1938, at the young age of 18. He went on to do graduate work in creative writing and, later, literary criticism at the University of Iowa, where he received his master's degree in 1940. This was followed by series of teaching stints at the University of Iowa (1939–41) and Drake University (1941–42), which was interrupted by military service during the Second World War. After the war, Price went to Yale, where he did doctoral work on Jonathan Swift under Maynard Mack, earning a Ph.D. in 1950.

Afterward, Price remained at Yale, where he was named assistant professor of English in 1952, associated professor in 1958, and full professor in 1964. From 1968 to 1971 he served as chairman of the English department. Price was named the Thomas E. Donnelly Professor in 1971 and appointed Sterling Professor of English in 1978, a post he held until 1990, when he became Sterling Professor emeritus.

== Works ==
- Swift's Rhetorical Art: A Study in Structure and Meaning (1953)
- To the palace of wisdom: Studies in order and energy from Dryden to Blake (1964)
- The Oxford Anthology of English Literature (1973, co-editor)
- Forms of Life: Character and Moral Imagination in the Novel (1983)
