= Sterling Professor =

Highest academic rank at Yale University

Sterling Professor, the highest academic rank at Yale University, is awarded to a tenured faculty member considered the best in their field. It is akin to the rank of distinguished professor at other universities.

The appointment can be granted to any Yale faculty member, and is made by the president of Yale University and confirmed by the Yale Corporation. Up to forty professors can hold the title at the same time. The position was established through a 1918 bequest from John William Sterling, and the first Sterling Professor was appointed in 1920.

== History ==
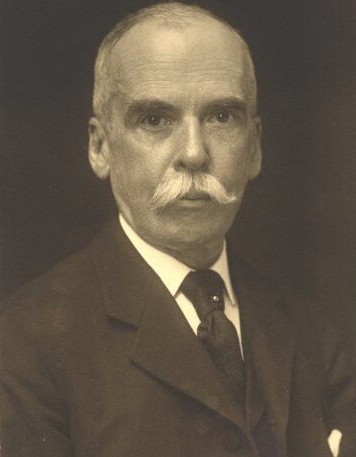
John W. Sterling, namesake of the title

The professorships are named for and funded by a $15-million bequest left by John W. Sterling, partner in the New York law firm Shearman & Sterling and an 1864 graduate of Yale College. In addition to funding many campus buildings, including the Sterling Memorial Library, the bequest required "to some extent, the foundation of Scholarships, Fellowships or Lectureships, the endowment of new professorships and the establishment of special funds for prizes." Sterling's trustees eventually left the university more than $5 million for this purpose—about $225,000 per chair.

The first Sterling Professor was chemist John Johnston, who was awarded the rank in 1920. He was joined later that year by school administrator Frank E. Spaulding, biochemist Lafayette Mendel, and astronomer Ernest William Brown. By the mid-1920s, the endowment allowed eighteen Sterling Professors to be appointed. In 1958, the Yale Corporation capped the number of simultaneous appointments at 27, but further endowment growth allowed this to expand to 40 by 2011. In addition to currently appointed faculty, a number of former Sterling Professors retain emeritus appointments at the university and continue to teach.

The first woman to be named Sterling Professor was cell biologist Marilyn Farquhar, in 1987. After she left Yale in 1989, Middle English scholar Marie Borroff and geneticist Carolyn Slayman were the next women appointed, in 1991. Among the youngest appointees were John Farquhar Fulton, made Sterling Professor of Physiology in 1929 at age 30, and later-U.S Supreme Court Justice William O. Douglas, appointed in 1932 at the age of 33. Joan Steitz and Thomas Steitz, biochemists appointed in 1999 and 2001 respectively, were the first married couple to have both held the appointment. In 2021, Michael Della Rocca and Christine Hayes, professors of philosophy and religious studies, respectively, became the second married couple to be named Sterling Professors.

== List of Sterling Professors ==
=== Current ===
Name	Field	Appointed	Notability	Ref
Bruce Ackerman	Law and Political Science	1987	Political philosophy; constitutional law	
Rolena Adorno	Spanish	2012	Colonial Latin American literature	
Akhil Amar	Law and Political Science	2008	Constitutional law	
Elijah Anderson	Sociology	2018	Urban ethnography, cultural theory	
Harold Attridge	Divinity	2012	New Testament scholarship; dean of Yale Divinity School (2002–2012)	
Steven T. Berry	Economics	2025	Industrial organization; applied microeconomics	
David W. Blight	History	2019	Historian of the American Civil War and the Reconstruction era	
R. Howard Bloch	French	2005		
Ronald Breaker	Molecular, Cellular and Developmental Biology	2017	Discovery of riboswitches	
David Bromwich	English	2006	Literary criticism; writings on politics, philosophy, education	
Francesco Casetti	Film and Media Studies, Humanities Program	2021	Film's cultural impact; spectatorship; visual media; semiotics	
Nicholas A. Christakis	Sociology, Medicine, Network Science	2018	Contributions in network science; biosocial science; and public health	
Ronald Coifman	Mathematics	2021	Contributions to pure mathematics, leading the field in adapting to the capabilities of the digital computer	
Michael Della Rocca	Philosophy	2021	Early modern philosophy, rationalism, contemporary metaphysics	
Michael Donoghue	Ecology and Evolutionary Biology	2011	Plant evolution; TreeBASE; director of the Peabody Museum of Natural History (2003–2008)	
Richard A. Flavell	Immunology	2002		
Alan Gerber	Political Science	2022	Political behavior, application of experimental methods to politics	
Steven Girvin	Physics	2024	Condensed matter physics	
Roberto González Echevarría	Hispanic and Comparative Literature	1995	National Humanities Medal	
Arthur Horwich	Genetics and Pediatrics	2007	Chaperonin action	
Akiko Iwasaki	Molecular, Cellular and Developmental Biology; Immunology	2022	COVID-19, human immune defense against viruses, vaccine methodology	
William L. Jorgensen	Chemistry	2009	Computational chemistry	
Alice Kaplan	French	2020	Guggenheim Fellow; director of Whitney Humanities Center; Scholar of Albert Camus	
Harold Koh	International Law	2003	Dean of Yale Law School; legal adviser to Department of State	
Anthony Kronman	Law	2003	Dean of Yale Law School	
Giuseppe Mazzotta	Italian Language and Literature	2003		
Ruslan Medzhitov	Immunobiology	2017	Innate immunity	
Mary Miller	History of Art	2008	Mesoamerican art; Mayan history; dean of Yale College (2008–2014)	
Scott Miller	Chemistry	2024	Organic chemistry	
William Nordhaus	Economics	2001	Economics of climate change; 2018 Nobel Prize in Economics	
Thomas D. Pollard	Molecular, Cellular and Developmental Biology	2006	Dean of the Yale Graduate School of Arts & Sciences	
Robert Post	Law	2017	Constitutional law, First Amendment, dean of Yale Law School (2009–2017)	
Anna Marie Pyle	Molecular Biology	2018	RNA folding	
David Quint	Comparative Literature	2006		
Roberta Romano	Law	2011	Corporate law	
James Rothman	Cell Biology	2017	Research on vesicles; winner of 2013 Nobel Prize in Physiology or Medicine	
Peter Salovey	Psychology	2024	President emeritus of Yale University; emotional intelligence; health psychology	
Robert J. Schoelkopf	Physics and Applied Physics	2013	Inventor of the single-electron transistor, the transmon, and circuit quantum electrodynamics	
Alan Schwartz	Law	2001	Legal scholar of corporate finance and governance	
Ian Shapiro	Political Science	2005	Democratic theorist and methodological realist	
Robert Shiller	Economics	2013	Real estate and financial markets; market bubbles; 2013 Nobel Prize in Economics	
Dieter Söll	Molecular Biophysics and Biochemistry	2006		
Daniel Spielman	Computer Science	2018	Error-correcting codes; Kadison–Singer conjecture	
Joan Steitz	Molecular Biophysics and Biochemistry	1999		
Ruth Yeazell	English	2018	Gender studies	
Sherman Weissman	Genetics			

=== Emeritus ===
Name	Field	Appointed	Notability	Ref
Robert Adair	Physics	1988		
Sidney Altman	Biology	1989	Nobel Prize in Chemistry; dean of Yale College	
Marie Borroff	English	1991	Middle English translation and criticism	
Peter Brooks	Comparative Literature and French	2001		
Guido Calabresi	Law	1978	Dean of Yale Law School (1985–1994)	
Mirjan Damaška	Law	1996	Scholar of comparative criminal law	
Owen M. Fiss	Law		Legal theorist	
Gerhard Giebisch	Cellular and Molecular Physiology	1970	Renal transport physiology	
Christine Hayes	Religious Studies	2021	Talmudic-midrashic Studies and Jewish Law	
Marcia Johnson	Psychology	2011	Memory research; source-monitoring error and reality monitoring	
Alan E. Kazdin	Psychology	2015	Director of the Yale Parenting Center and Child Conduct Clinic	
Howard Lamar	History	1994	Historian of the American frontier	
John H. Langbein	Law and Legal History	2001	Anglo-American and European legal history	
Jerry L. Mashaw	Law	1995	Administrative law	
David R. Mayhew	Political Science	1998	American electoral politics; divided government	
Peter Moore	Chemistry	2002	Discovery of ribosome large subunit's atomic structure with Thomas Steitz	
Annabel Patterson	English	2001		
Peter C. B. Phillips	Economics	1989	Econometrician; finite-sample theory; time series regression	
Joseph Roach	Theater	2008	History of theater and dramatic literature	
Robert G. Shulman	Molecular Biophysics and Biochemistry	1994	Nuclear magnetic resonance techniques in biochemistry	
John C. Tully	Chemistry	2006		

=== Left ===
Name	Field	Appointed	Notability	Ref
Nancy Cott	History and American Studies	2001	Historian of marriage, gender, and sexuality	
Samuel J. Danishefsky	Chemistry	1989		
Menachem Elimelech	Chemical and Environmental Engineering	2021	Water science and technology; water-energy nexus	
Marilyn Farquhar	Medicine	1987		
Sharon Hammes-Schiffer	Chemistry	2021	Theoretical chemistry	
Richard P. Lifton	Genetics	2002	Genetics of hypertension	
Ira Mellman	Cell Biology	2002	Discovery of endosomes	
Alanna Schepartz	Chemistry	2017	Chemical and synthetic biology	
Samuel O. Thier	Medicine	1975	Effects of health policy on academic institutions	

=== Deceased ===
Name	Field	Appointed	Notability	Ref
Erich Auerbach	Romance Philology	1956	Literary critic; Mimesis: The Representation of Reality in Western Literature	
E. Wight Bakke	Economics	1940	Economic sociologist of labor and unemployment	
Frank A. Beach	Psychology	1952	Ethologist; Patterns of Sexual Behavior	
Samuel Flagg Bemis	Diplomatic History and International Relations	1945	Historian of United States diplomacy; 1927 Pulitzer Prize for History; 1950 Pulitzer Prize for Biography	
Thomas G. Bergin	Romance Languages and Literature	1957	Scholar of Italian literature and Dante Alighieri	
Jerome A. Berson	Chemistry	1992		
Alexander Bickel	Law	1974	US Supreme Court historian and scholar of judicial restraint	
Boris Bittker	Law	1970	Scholar of tax law; proponent of reparations	
Charles Black	Law	1975		
Francis Gilman Blake	Medicine	1927	Dean of the Yale School of Medicine	
Brand Blanshard	Philosophy	1945		
Harold Bloom	Humanities	1983	Literary criticism; The Anxiety of Influence; The Western Canon	
Leonard Bloomfield	Linguistics	1940	Bloomfieldean linguistics	
Edwin Borchard	International Law	1929	Scholar of wrongful conviction	
David Allan Bromley	Sciences	1994	Nuclear physicist; science adviser to George H. W. Bush; dean of Engineering (1994–2000)	
C. F. Tucker Brooke	English	1949	Scholar of Elizabethan dramatic literature and Shakespeare Apocrypha; founder of The Yale Shakespeare	
Ernest William Brown	Mathematics	1921	Lunar theory	
Robert L. Calhoun	Historical Theology	1963		
Brevard Childs	Divinity	1992	Canonical criticism	
Charles Edward Clark	Law	1929	Dean of Yale Law School (1929–1939); judge for the U.S. Second Circuit Court of Appeals (1939–1963)	
Donald J. Cohen	Child Psychiatry	2000	Tourette's syndrome, autism	
Wilbur Lucius Cross	English	1922	Dean of the Graduate School (1916–1930); governor of Connecticut (1931–1939)	
Donald Crothers	Chemistry	1997	Physical chemistry of nucleic acids	
Harvey Cushing	Neurology	1933	Neurosurgery pioneer; Cushing's disease	
Robert A. Dahl	Political Science	1964	Democratic theorist; polyarchy; pluralism; Johan Skytte Prize (1995)	
David Brion Davis	American History	1978	Historian of American slavery; 1967 Pulitzer Prize for History	
Peter Demetz	Germanic Language and Literature		President of the Modern Language Association	
Leonard W. Doob	Psychiatry	1997	1960 Guggenheim Fellow	
William O. Douglas	Law	1931	Associate justice of the United States Supreme Court	
J. G. Dusser de Barenne	Physiology	1930		
Alvan Feinstein	Medicine and Epidemiology	1991		
William Fellner	Economics	1959		
Albert Feuillerat	French	1929		
Frederic Brenton Fitch	Philosophy	1974	Logician; symbolic and combinatory logic; Fitch-style calculus	
John Farquhar Fulton	Physiology and History of Medicine	1930	Primate neurophysiology	
Raymond Fuoss	Chemistry	1945		
Ralph Henry Gabriel	History	1948		
John Gassner	Playwriting	1956	Drama critic	
Peter Gay	History	1984	Western cultural history; life of Sigmund Freud	
Grant Gilmore	Law	1973		
Albrecht Goetze	Assyriology and Babylonian Literature	1956		
Abraham S. Goldstein	Law	1978	Criminal law scholar; historian of insanity defense; dean of Yale Law School (1970–1975)	
Henry S. Graves	Forestry	1922	Founder of Yale School of Forestry; chief of the United States Forest Service	
Ross Granville Harrison	Biology	1927	Embryologist; inventor of artificial tissue culture	
Geoffrey Hartman	English and Comparative Literature		Literary criticism; deconstructionism	
Eric A. Havelock	Classics	1963		
Heinrich E. K. Henel	German	1963		
Hajo Holborn	History	1959	Historian of modern Germany	
John Hollander	English	1995	Poet; translator; scholar of prosody	
Carl Hovland	Psychology	1947		
Vernon Hughes	Physics	1978		
Clark L. Hull	Psychology	1947	Learning theorist; drive reduction theory	
G. Evelyn Hutchinson	Zoology	1952	Limnologist; "father of modern ecology"	
Treat Baldwin Johnson	Chemistry	1928		
John Johnston	Chemistry	1920		
Donald Kagan	Classics and History	2002	Historian of the Peloponnesian War, dean of Yale College	
Eugen Kahn	Psychiatry and Mental Hygiene	1930		
Andrew Keogh	Bibliography	1924	Yale University librarian (1916–1938)	
Friedrich Kessler	Law	1964		
John Gamble Kirkwood	Chemistry	1956	Kirkwood approximation	
Adolph Knopf	Physical Geology	1938		
George Kubler	History of Art	1975	Art historian of Pre-Columbian and Ibero-American Art	
Kenneth Scott Latourette	Missions and Oriental History	1949	Historian of Christianity and Christian missions	
Theodore Lidz	Psychiatry		Schizophrenia researcher	
Charles E. Lindblom	Political Science and Economics		Critique of polyarchy; incrementalism; The Science of "Muddling Through"	
Ralph Linton	Anthropology	1946		
Juan Linz	Political and Social Science	1989	Regime types; democratic transitions; Johan Skytte Prize (1996)	
Cyril Long	Chemistry	1938	Dean of the Yale School of Medicine; diabetes researcher	
Robert Lopez	History	1970	Director of Peabody Museum of Natural History (1922–1938); proponent of orthogenetic evolutionary theory	
Charles T. Loram	Education	1930		
Floyd Lounsbury	Anthropology		American Indian linguist	
Richard Swann Lull	Paleontology	1927	Director of Peabody Museum of Natural History (1922–1938); proponent of orthogenetic evolutionary theory	
Maynard Mack	English	1965	Shakespeare scholar; biographer of Alexander Pope	
Paul de Man	Comparative Literature and French	1979	Major figure in literary deconstruction and Yale school	
Benoit Mandelbrot	Mathematical Sciences	1999	Fractal geometry; Mandelbrot set	
Louis L. Martz	English	1971		
Georges C. May	French	1971	Scholar of the French Enlightenment; dean of Yale College (1963–1971); Yale provost (1979–1981)	
Edwin McClellan	Japanese Literature	1999	Translator of Japanese literature	
Myres McDougal	International Law	1958	Founder of New Haven School of Jurisprudence	
Lafayette Mendel	Physiological Chemistry	1921		
Clarence W. Mendell	Latin Language and Literature	1947	Dean of Yale College (1926–1937)	
María Rosa Menocal	Humanities	2006		
James W. Moore	Law	1943	Legal realist	
Underhill Moore	Law	1929		
Edmund Morgan	History	1965	Biographer of Ben Franklin; historian of Puritanism; Pulitzer Special Citation (2006); National Humanities Medal	
John Spangler Nicholas	Biology	1939		
H. Richard Niebuhr	Theology and Christian Ethics	1954	Historian of American religion and theology	
F. S. C. Northrop	Philosophy and Law	1947		
Wallace Notestein	English History	1928	Historian of witchcraft	
Julian J. Obermann	Semitic Languages	1951		
Øystein Ore	Mathematics	1931		
George E. Palade	Cell Biology	1975	Discovery of ribosome; protein transport; 1974 Nobel Prize in Physiology and Medicine	
Edwards A. Park	Pediatrics	1922		
Jaroslav Pelikan	History	1972	Historian of Christianity and Christian theology; Kluge Prize awardee (2004)	
Henri Peyre	French	1938	1930 Guggenheim Fellow; president of the Modern Language Association	
Jerome J. Pollitt	Classical Archeology and History	1995	Hellenistic architecture and sculpture	
Frederick A. Pottle	English	1944	Editor of James Boswell's papers	
Martin Price	English	1978	1957 Guggenheim Fellow	
Eduard Prokosch	Germanic Languages	1930		
Lloyd George Reynolds	Economics	1952	1954 Guggenheim Fellow	
Frederic M. Richards	Molecular Biophysics and Biochemistry	1989		
Abraham Robinson	Mathematics	1967	Non-standard analysis	
James Harvey Rogers	Political Economy	1931	Economic policy advisor to Franklin Roosevelt administration; monetary policy theorist	
Franz Rosenthal	Near Eastern Languages and Literatures	1964	Scholar of Islamic and Arabic literature	
Michael Rostovtzeff	Ancient History and Classical Archeology	1925	Social and economic historian of Ancient Greece and the Roman Empire	
Eugene V. Rostow	Law and Public Affairs	1964	Dean of Yale Law School (1955–1965)	
Frank Ruddle	Biology	1988	Founder of Human Genome Project	
Edward Sapir	Anthropology and Linguistics	1931	Founder of descriptive linguistics; Sapir–Whorf hypothesis	
Herbert Scarf	Economics	1979		
James C. Scott	Political Science	2001	Peasant resistance; non-state spaces; infrapolitics; Seeing Like a State	
Vincent Scully	History of Art	1983		
Milton Senn	Pediatrics and Psychiatry	1964		
Charles Seymour	History	1922	Biographer of Woodrow Wilson; Yale president (1937–1950); Yale provost (1928–1937)	
Harry Shulman	Law	1940	Dean of Yale Law School (1954–1955); labor arbitration scholar	
Edmund Ware Sinnott	Botany	1940	Dean of the Yale Graduate School; plant morphogenesis	
Carolyn Slayman	Genetics	1991		
Albert J. Solnit	Pediatrics and Psychiatry	1970		
Frank E. Spaulding	School Administration	1921		
Jonathan Spence	History	1993	Historian of China; president of the American Historical Association	
Nicholas J. Spykman	International Relations	1934		
Thomas Steitz	Molecular Biophysics and Biochemistry	2001	2009 Nobel Prize in Chemistry; discovery of ribosome large subunit's atomic structure with Peter Moore	
Thomas W. Swan	Law	1922	Dean of the Yale Law School (1916–1927); judge for the U.S. Second Circuit Court of Appeals	
Chauncey Brewster Tinker	English Literature	1923	Rare books collector	
James Tobin	Economics	1957	Nobel laureate in Economics	
Karl Turekian	Geology and Geophysics	2003	Geochemistry; radiogenic isotope; environmental history and global environmental change	
Charles Hyde Warren	Geology	1922	Dean of the Sheffield Scientific School (1922–1945)	
Hermann J. Weigand	Germanic Literature		1954 Guggenheim Fellow	
Luther Allan Weigle	Religious Education	1924	Dean of the Yale Divinity School	
Paul Weiss	Philosophy	1962	Philosopher of metaphysics; 1937 Guggenheim Fellow	
René Wellek	Comparative Literature	1952		
Harry H. Wellington	Law	1983	Dean of Yale Law School (1975–1985)	
Stanley Williams	American Literature	1944	Literary scholar of Washington Irving and Herman Melville	
William Kurtz Wimsatt Jr.	English	1974	Early theorist of New Criticism; progenitor of intentional fallacy	
Walter Jacob Wohlenberg	Mechanical Engineering	1949	Dean of the School of Engineering (1948–1955)	
Arnold O. Wolfers	International Relations	1949	Realist international relations theory	
C. Vann Woodward	History	1961	Historian of the American South; Pulitzer Prize for History (1982)	
Karl Young	English	1938		
Edward Zigler	Psychology	1976	Child psychologist; architect of Head Start Program	
