= Westerly Hospital =

Coordinates: 41.362316°N 71.824887°W

Geography
- Location: Westerly, Rhode Island, United States

Services
- Beds: 125

History
- Opened: 1925

Links
- Website: Official website
- Lists: Hospitals in Rhode Island

Westerly Hospital is a non-profit hospital in Westerly, Rhode Island.

== History ==
According to the 2017 PBS documentary "Our Town - Westerly", a longtime resident of Westerly named Louise Hoxie died in 1917 and left $10,000 "to establish a foundation fund" for a hospital in Westerly. The intent of this money was to use it as seed money for investments to accrue capital for a hospital, with the fund eventually growing to a reported $200,000.

Westerly Hospital was founded in 1925 to continually improve the health and well-being of the people in the region.

The hospital was acquired by Lawrence and Memorial Hospital in 2013. In 2015 the hospital became part of the Yale New Haven Health System.

One of Florence Nightingale's nursing caps was on display in the lobby of the hospital, starting in 1965. As of 2019, the cap is no longer on display.

== Services ==
The hospital employs 742 employees and 307 medical staff.

During its 2020 fiscal year, it reported 12,609 inpatient discharges and 284,718 outpatient visits.

The Westerly Hospital provides comprehensive diagnostic and therapeutic services to inpatients and outpatients, with particular expertise in laboratory services, diagnostic imaging, surgery, emergency care, cardiac care, physical therapy & rehabilitation. Smilow Cancer Hospital Care Center provides cancer care and treatment to western Rhode Island.

In late 2019, Westerly Hospital opened a Geriatric-Psychiatric unit, providing 18 beds to 55-years of age and older patients.

== See also ==
- Lawrence+Memorial Hospital
- Yale-New Haven Hospital
