= Yale New Haven Health System =

Healthcare provider in Connecticut, United States

Yale New Haven Health System (YNHHS) is a nonprofit healthcare system with headquarters in New Haven, Connecticut. It is Connecticut's largest healthcare system with 2,681 beds and includes hospitals, physicians and related health services throughout Connecticut as well as New York and Rhode Island. Institutions affiliated with the system include Bridgeport Hospital, Greenwich Hospital, Lawrence + Memorial Hospital, Westerly Hospital, Smilow Cancer Hospital, Yale New Haven Hospital, Yale New Haven Children's Hospital, Bridgeport Hospital Milford Campus, Yale New Haven Psychiatric Hospital and Northeast Medical Group.

== History ==
Yale New Haven Health System was formed in 1996 through a partnership between Bridgeport and Yale New Haven hospitals. The system expanded in 1998 with the addition of Greenwich Hospital. In 2016, an affiliation between Yale New Haven Health and Lawrence + Memorial Healthcare, which includes Lawrence + Memorial Hospital and Westerly Hospital in Rhode Island, was approved. The system is affiliated with Yale University in support of patient care, medical education and clinical research. It also has clinical and business relationships with several hospitals in Connecticut and numerous outpatient locations throughout the state. The system operates more than 360 locations in Connecticut, southeastern New York and Rhode Island. As of 2024, YNHHS managed 2,681 beds and more than 28,589 employees.

In August 2018, YNHHS was awarded the AHIMA Grace Award. The award "recognizes achievements in health information management that measurably impact quality and performance, highlighting organizations that leverage data analytics to make better decisions around clinical, financial, and operational challenges."

== Leadership ==
- Christopher O’Connor: CEO, Yale New Haven Health System
- Katherine Heilpern, MD: President of Yale New Haven Hospital
- Anne Diamond, JD: President of Bridgeport Hospital

== Community ==
In fiscal year 2016, YNHHS provided $178.1 million in community benefits, including uncompensated, undercompensated and charity care.

== SkyHealth ==
For information about the air ambulance service, see: SkyHealth
