= List of Loomis Chaffee School alumni =

The following is a list of notable alumni of Loomis Chaffee School. Also called LC or Loomis, the Loomis Chaffee School is a college preparatory school located in Windsor, Connecticut.

== A ==
- John Ashmead 1934 – writer, educator, author of The Mountain and the Feather, writer for The Atlantic, book reviewer for The Philadelphia Bulletin

== B ==
- Deborah Baker 1977 – biographer and essayist known for A Blue Hand: The Beats in India, a biography of Allen Ginsberg that focuses on his time in India
- Stephen R. Barnett – legal scholar
- Peter Barton 1969 – British military historian, author and filmmaker specialising in trench warfare during World War I
- Jerome Beatty Jr. 1935 – twentieth-century author of children's literature; feature writer for magazines
- Andrew Berenzweig 1995 – professional ice hockey player, Nashville Predators
- Gerald Warner Brace 1918 – writer, educator, sailor, and boat builder
- Peter C. Brinckerhoff 1970 – writer, educator of nonprofits
- Harry G. Broadman 1973 – foreign trade and investment negotiator, global business growth strategist, corporate director, private equity investor, economist, litigation dispute expert, author and journalist
- Mark Brown 1977 – Major League Baseball pitcher for the Baltimore Orioles (1984) and Minnesota Twins (1985)
- Frank Bruni 1982 – reporter, food critic, and columnist, The New York Times; author of Ambling into History: The Unlikely Odyssey of George W. Bush
- Jacob Bryson 2016 – professional ice hockey player, Buffalo Sabres
- Miriam Butterworth 1936 – educator, activist, and politician who fought for equal representation in the Connecticut General Assembly

== C ==
- Jesse Camp 1997 – video jockey, media personality
- David E. Cane 1962 – biological chemist serving as the Vernon K. Krieble Professor of Chemistry Emeritus and professor of Molecular Biology, Cell Biology, and Biochemistry emeritus at Brown University
- Richard Adams Carey 1969 – writer best known for Against the Tide: The Fate of the New England Fisherman
- Jonathan Carroll 1967 – author of The Land of Laughs, Voice of Our Shadow, Bones of the Moon, A Child Across the Sky, Black Cocktail, Sleeping in Flame, Outside the Dog Museum, After Silence, From the Teeth of Angels
- John Chamberlain 1920 – journalist, business and economic historian, syndicated columnist and literary critic
- Benjamin Cheever 1967 – author of The Plagiarist, The Partisan, Famous After Death
- Pauline Chen 1982 – surgeon, author, and The New York Times columnist
- Chris Cillizza 1994 – political journalist at CNN and author
- Aaron Civale 2013 – professional baseball pitcher for the Milwaukee Brewers of the MLB
- Larry Collins 1947 – author of Is Paris Burning?
- Nancy W. Collins 1991 – Columbia University professor
- Neal Conan – radio journalist, producer, editor, and correspondent who worked for National Public Radio and hosted Talk of the Nation
- Alfred V. Covello 1950 – senior United States district judge of the United States District Court for the District of Connecticut, former Connecticut Supreme Court justice
- Alexander M. Cutler 1969 – former chairman and CEO of multinational power management company Eaton Corporation

== D ==
- Bianca D'Agostino 2007 – soccer player for the Boston Breakers
- Damon Daunno 2003 – Tony and Grammy-nominated actor, musician, and composer known for playing Curly McLain in the Broadway revival of Oklahoma!
- Adam Davies 1990 – author known for The Frog King
- Bob Davis – Major League Baseball pitcher
- Ruthie Davis 1980 – founder, designer, and president of luxury shoe brand Ruthie Davis
- Myron "Moe" W. Drabowsky 1953 – Major League Baseball player with the Baltimore Orioles and other teams
- Guilford Dudley Jr. 1925 – U.S. ambassador to Denmark

== E ==
- David Edelstein 1977 – film critic for New York Magazine, NPR's Fresh Air, CBS Sunday Morning, Slate, the New York Post, the Village Voice, and the Boston Phoenix
- Warren William Eginton 1941 – senior United States district judge of the United States District Court for the District of Connecticut
- Alexander Eliot 1936 – writer who served as art editor for Time magazine; known for his works on spirituality and myth
- James F. English Jr. 1944 – former bank executive and president of Trinity College
- Lord David Ennals (one-year student) – British Labour Party politician and campaigner for human rights who served as secretary of state for Social Services 1976–1979

== F ==
- Scott Fankhouser 1994 – former ice hockey goaltender; former assistant coach for the Cincinnati Cyclones; current assistant manager of Swonder Ice Arena in Evansville, Indiana
- Diana Farrell 1983 – founding president and CEO of the JPMorgan Chase Institute, member of the Council on Foreign Relations, and deputy assistant on Economic Policy to President Barack Obama

== G ==
- Betty Gilpin 2004 – Emmy-winning actress known for her performances in the Netflix comedy series GLOW and Nurse Jackie
- Jack Gould (1914–1993) – influential television and radio critic and reporter for The New York Times 1944–1972
- Pete Grannis 1960 – former commissioner of the New York State Department of Environmental Conservation and member of the New York State Assembly
- Ella T. Grasso 1936 – first woman elected governor of Connecticut and the first woman elected governor of any US state without following her husband

== H ==
- John A. Hall 1964 – professor of Comparative Historical Sociology at McGill University
- Benjamin Hedges 1926 – Olympic track and field athlete (1928)
- Chris Hedges 1975 – fellow at Nation Institute; professor at Princeton University; author of War Is a Force That Gives Us Meaning; former Middle East bureau chief for The New York Times; former correspondent, National Public Radio; member of team winning 2002 Pulitzer Prize for explanatory journalism; 2002 Amnesty International Global Award for Human Rights Journalism
- Liana Hinds 2011 – American-born Trinidadian footballer who plays as a defender for Swedish club Sundsvalls DFF and the Trinidad and Tobago women's national team
- Allan Hobson 1951 – psychiatrist, dream researcher, and professor of Psychiatry, emeritus, at Harvard Medical School; known for research on rapid eye movement sleep
- Henry R. Horsey 1943 – Delaware Supreme Court justice
- Sirena Huang 2012 – Taiwanese-American concert violinist
- Morris N. Hughes, Jr. 1963 – career foreign service officer who served as the United States ambassador to Burundi

== I ==
- Robert Grant Irving 1958 – author of Indian Summer

== K ==
- Charles Kaiser 1968 – author, journalist, and acting director of the LGBTQ Public Policy Center at Hunter College
- David E. Kaiser 1965 – professor of history, Naval War College, Newport, Rhode Island; author of American Tragedy, Politics and War: European Conflict from Philip II to Hitler, and Epic Season: The 1948 American League Pennant Race
- Robert G. Kaiser 1960 – managing editor of and associate editor and senior correspondent for The Washington Post; author of Russia from the Inside and Act of Congress: How America's Essential Institution Works, and How It Doesn't
- Jamie Kennedy 1974 – Canadian chef and recipient of the Order of Canada
- Ray Kidder 1941 – physicist and nuclear weapons designer
- Henry R. Kravis 1963 – billionaire, founding partner of Kohlberg Kravis Roberts & Co.
- Corby Kummer 1974 – restaurant critic for Boston magazine and editor of The Atlantic magazine
- Alexander Kuo 1957 – teacher, poet, fiction writer, and essayist who served as professor of English at Washington State University
- Joshua Kurlantzick 1994 – journalist and fellow for Southeast Asia at the Council on Foreign Relations

== L ==
- Pete Larson 1962 – former American football running back for the Washington Redskins
- Neil Lebhar 1968 – Anglican bishop who served as the first bishop of the Gulf Atlantic Diocese
- Tom Lehrer 1943 – musical satirist, entertainer, and mathematician
- Nicholas M. Loeb – businessman and son of John Langeloth Loeb, Jr.
- Tony Lupien 1935 – first baseman in Major League Baseball; left-handed batter who played for the Boston Red Sox, Philadelphia Phillies, and Chicago White Sox; grandfather of John Cena

== M ==
- David Margolick 1970 – contributing editor, Vanity Fair; national legal affairs correspondent, The New York Times; author of At the Bar, Undue Influence: The Epic Battle for the Johnson & Johnson Fortune, Strange Fruit: The Biography of a Song, Beyond Glory: Joe Louis vs. Max Schmeling and a World on the Brink
- Andrea McCarren 1981 – television journalist and educator
- Taylor Mead 1942 – writer, actor, and performer known for his appearances in Andy Warhol's underground films
- Terry Melcher – musician, songwriter ("Kokomo") and producer, The Beach Boys and The Byrds; son of Doris Day
- Christopher Mellon 1975 - Member of the Mellon family and former Deputy Assistant Secretary of Defense for Intelligence under the Bush and Clinton administrations. Advocate for government transparency into UFO investigations.
- Nana Mensah 2001 – actress, writer, and director
- Geoff Muldaur 1961 – singer, songwriter, solo guitarist and a founding member of the Jim Kweskin Jug Band
- Matthew M. Murray 1989 – Major League Baseball pitcher, Boston Red Sox (1995)
- John Garvan Murtha 1959 – senior United States district judge of the United States District Court for the District of Vermont

== N ==
- John Nichols 1958 – novelist known for the New Mexico Trilogy
- Charles Hollister Noble – historical novelist and screenwriter

== O ==
- John Peter Oleson 1964 – Canadian classical archaeologist and historian of ancient technology
- Richard Ottinger 1946 – legal educator and politician from New York who served in the United States House of Representatives for eight terms

== P ==
- David Park – painter and a pioneer of the Bay Area Figurative Movement in painting during the 1950s
- J.J. Philbin 1992 – producer and screenwriter known for her work on The O.C.
- Richard Plepler 1977 – former chairman and CEO of HBO

== R ==
- David M. Raup 1950 – University of Chicago paleontologist
- Betsy Reed 1986 – journalist and editor-in-chief of The Intercept; editor of The Nation
- Howie Richmond 1935 – music publisher and music industry executive
- Richard Rifkind 1948 – cancer researcher who served as chairman and chief scientific officer of the Sloan Kettering Institute
- Thomas D. Ritter 1970 – lawyer, lobbyist, and retired politician from Connecticut; speaker of the Connecticut House of Representatives
- John D. Rockefeller III 1925 – philanthropist
- Winthrop Rockefeller 1931 – first Republican governor of Arkansas
- Selden Rodman 1927 – prolific writer of poetry, plays and prose, political commentary, art criticism, Latin American and Caribbean history, biography and travel writing
- Adam Rome 1976 – environmental historian; teaches environmental history and environmental non-fiction at the University at Buffalo

== S ==
- Amir Satvat 2000 – video game executive known for efforts helping jobseekers
- Keith Scribner 1980 – novelist, short-story writer, screenwriter, essayist, and educator
- Richard Scudder 1931 – newspaper pioneer, newspaper publisher, journalist, and co-founder of the MediaNews Group
- George Selden 1947 – author of The Cricket in Times Square and other children's classics
- Edward H. Shortliffe 1965 – biomedical informatician, physician, and computer scientist who pioneered the use of artificial intelligence in medicine
- George P. Shultz 1938 – former United States secretary of state
- Joyce Sidman 1974 – children's writer
- John Chabot Smith 1932 – journalist with the Washington Post, White House correspondent, and author of Alger Hiss: The True Story, an account sympathetic to Hiss
- Lyman Maynard Stowe 1930 – physician, first dean of the University of Connecticut School of Medicine
- R. Peter Straus 1940 – media proprietor who served as president of WMCA and chairman of Strauss News, member of the Sulzberger family
- Steven Strogatz 1976 – professor of Applied Mathematics, Cornell University, recipient of Presidential Young Investigator Award, author of SYNC: The Emerging Science of Spontaneous Order, math blogger for The New York Times (2010)
- Hazel Thrall Sullivan – state representative from Connecticut
- Arthur Ochs Sulzberger 1945 – chairman and publisher of The New York Times

== T ==
- John Terry 1968 – film and television actor, Against the Grain, A Dangerous Woman, Iron Will, Lost
- Jeremiah Tower 1961 – celebrity chef credited with pioneering the culinary style known as California cuisine
- James B. Twitchell 1962 – author and former professor of English at University of Florida

== U ==
- Gretchen Ulion 1990 – Olympic gold medalist, U.S. women's Olympic hockey team, Nagano, Japan 1998

== W ==
- Katherine Waterston 1998 – actor, Fantastic Beasts and Where to Find Them
- Geoffrey Wawro 1978 – professor of Military History at the University of North Texas
- Nancy Weber 1959 – writer known primarily for The Life Swap
- Benjamin C. Wedeman 1979 – journalist and war correspondent
- William Wemple 1930 – lawyer who served in the United States Navy Reserve as a lieutenant commander and as general counsel of the Navy
- Mike Whalen 1979 – athlete and coach for Williams College and Wesleyan University
- A.B.C. Whipple 1936 – journalist for Life magazine, author, and historian
- James Widdoes 1972 – film and television actor, director, and producer: Animal House (actor), Charles in Charge (actor), Night Court (actor), Dave's World (director/actor), My Wife and Kids (director/actor), 8 Simple Rules... For Dating My Teenage Daughter (director/producer), Two and a Half Men (director)
- David Wild 1980 – senior editor, Rolling Stone; host of Musicians (Bravo)
- Robert Winters 1949 – president and CEO of Prudential Financial
- Jason Wu 2001 – fashion designer; designed First Lady Michelle Obama's inaugural ball gown and other pieces

== Z ==
- Drew Zingg 1973 – rock, blues, soul and jazz guitarist, best known for his performing with Steely Dan and Boz Scaggs

== Faculty ==
- Eric Wollencott Barnes – educator, diplomat, actor, and author
- Kalena Bovell – conductor who currently serves as assistant conductor of the Memphis Symphony Orchestra
- John Horne Burns – writer best known for his novel The Gallery (1947)
- Miriam Butterworth 1936 – educator, activist, and politician who taught at Loomis Chaffee
- Germaine Cheruy – French costume designer, artist, and intellectual; taught art programs at Loomis Chaffee
- René Cheruy – French soldier, educator, and artist; French professor and French department head at Loomis Chaffee; received the Legion of Honor
- William V. D'Antonio – Italian-American sociologist and educator
- John W. Howe – bishop of the Episcopal Diocese of Central Florida; served as the Loomis School's chaplain
- Evelyn Beatrice Longman – sculptor who married Headmaster Nathaniel Horton Batchelder and taught sculpting classes at the Loomis School
- Vincent Schaefer – chemist and meteorologist who developed cloud seeding; director of the Atmospheric Science Center at the Loomis School
