= Underground Voices =

American independent book publisher

- Categories: Novels, novellas, memoirs, poetry chapbooks, short story chapbooks, e-shorts
- Publisher: Cetywa Powell
- Country: United States
- Language: American English
- Website: undergroundvoices.com

Underground Voices is an independent American book publisher. Originally started as an online literary magazine in 2004, it expanded into a small press in 2009. In 2013, it became an independent book publisher.

== Awards and recognitions ==
Work published has been awarded or received honorable mention in the following:

- 2026 The BookFest Awards
- 2016 Finalist, 19th Library of Virginia Literary Award
- 2015 Finalist, Beverly Hills Literary Award
- 2014 Notable Indie Book, Shelf Unbound
- 2014 Finalist, International Book Awards
- Dzanc Books 2008 Best of the Web
- 2007 Pushcart Prize XXXI Best of the Small Presses Anthology - Special Mention
- storySouth Million Writer's Award 2004, 2005, 2007, 2008, 2009, 2010

== Select books by Underground Voices ==
- Church of the Last Lamb by Joseph Hirsch (2025; paperback 978-0998892382)
- Petroleum Transfer Engineer by Richard Klin (2018; paperback 978-0998892337)
- The Good Dead by Al Sim (2017; paperback 978-0998892313)
- Super Sport by Ralph Bland (2017; paperback 978-0998892306)
- The Pull of It by Wendy J. Fox (2016; paperback 978-0990433170)
- Miraculous Fauna by Timmy Reed (2016; paperback 978-0990433156)
- The Beginning Things by Bunny Goodjohn (2015; paperback 978-0990433163)
- West by Whitney Poole (2015; paperback 978-0990433132)
- The Demon who Peddled Longing by Khanh Ha (2014; paperback 978-0990433118)
- Faulkner & Friends by Vicki Salloum (2014; paperback 978-0990433101)
- The Collector of Tears by Michael C. Keith (2014; paperback 978-0983045670)
- Red Moon District (2013; paperback 978–0983045663)
- From the UV Files (2012; paperback 978-0983045632)
- Hotel Oblivion (2011; paperback 978-0983045625)
- Last Train To Noir City (2010; paperback 978-0-9830456-0-1)
- Chewing The Fat (2009; paperback 978-0615314754)

== Select shorts from Underground Voices e-book series ==
- Inferno by Jim Meirose (2017)
- Five Words That Can Cripple a Man by Max Mundan (2016)
- The Top Floor by Vince Reighard (2015)
- Hard to Learn. A novella by J.S. Kierland (2015)
- The Lightning Tree by Erin Pringle-Toungate (2015)

== Past contributors ==
Authors

- Zdravka Evtimova
- Margarita Engle
- Joe Clifford
- Wendy J. Fox
- James Brown (Los Angeles Diaries)
- Jack Micheline
- Andrew Coburn (Edgar Award nominee for the novel Goldlilocks)
- Michael C. Keith
- Ned Vizzini (It's Kind of a Funny Story, Be More Chill, Teen Angst? Naaah...)
- Cami Delavigne
- Nancy Weber (The Life Swap)

Poets

- Cortney Davis
- Patricia Fargnoli
- S.A. Griffin
- Lyn Lifshin
- Tony O'Neill (Down and Out on Murder Mile, Digging the Vein)
- Charles Plymell
- Linda Ravenswood

Artists

- Chris Anthony
- Alessandro Bavari
- Jeremy Caniglia
- Ben Goossens
- Misha Gordin
- Michal Macku
- Mark Parisi (Off the Mark comic panel)

== See also ==
- List of literary magazines
