= SFWP =

SFWP may refer to:

- Workers' Party (Ireland), previously Sinn Féin – The Workers' Party, a Marxist–Leninist political party active in both the Republic of Ireland and Northern Ireland
- Santa Fe Writers Project, a literary publisher
