= Rockville Town Center =

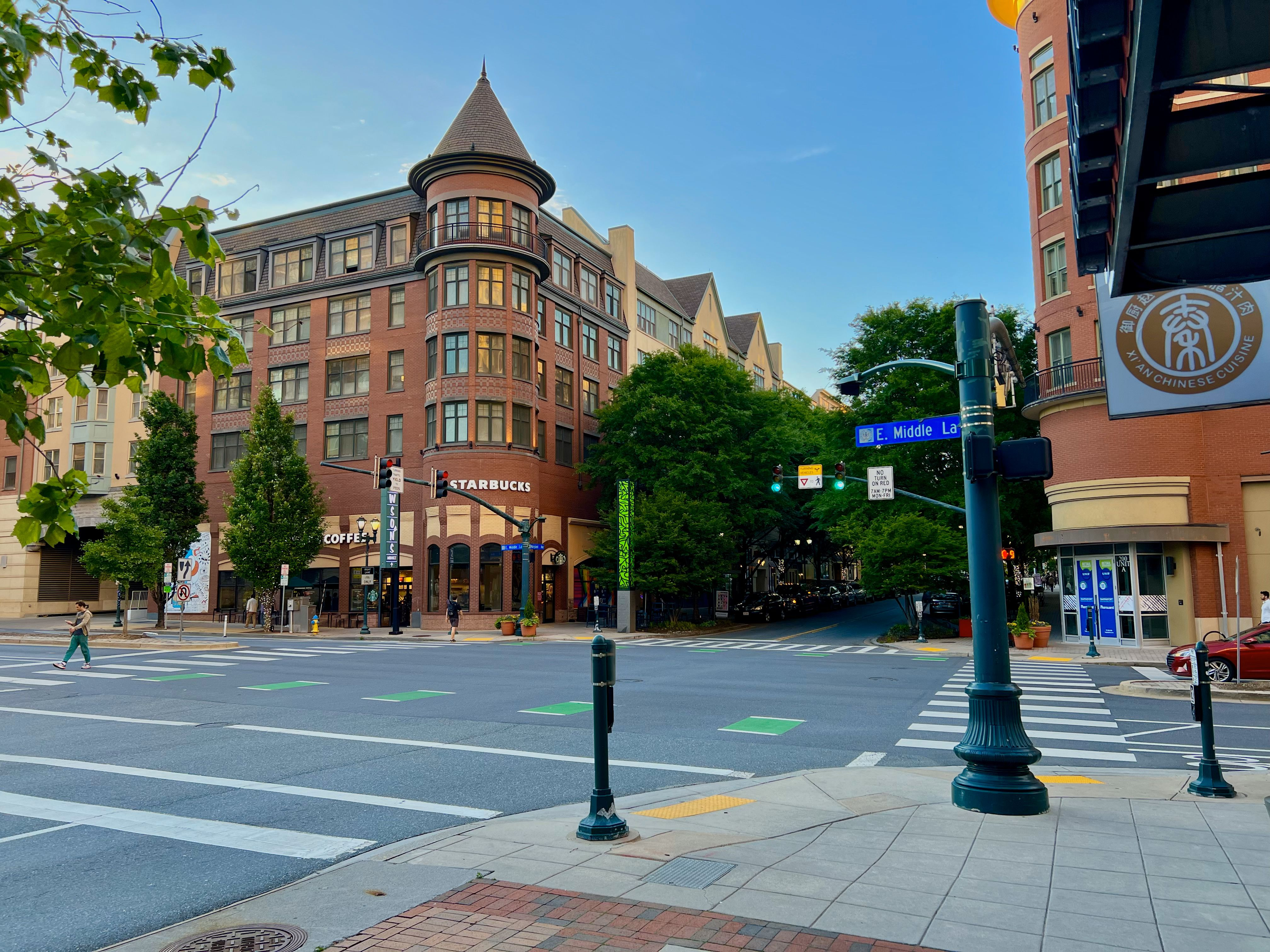
- Location: Rockville, Maryland, United States
- Coordinates: 39°5′7″N 77°9′3″W
- Opened: 1995
- Website: www.thesquarerockville.com

Rockville Town Center is a mixed-use area in downtown Rockville, Maryland. Opened in 1995, it replaced the demolished Rockville Mall.

== History ==
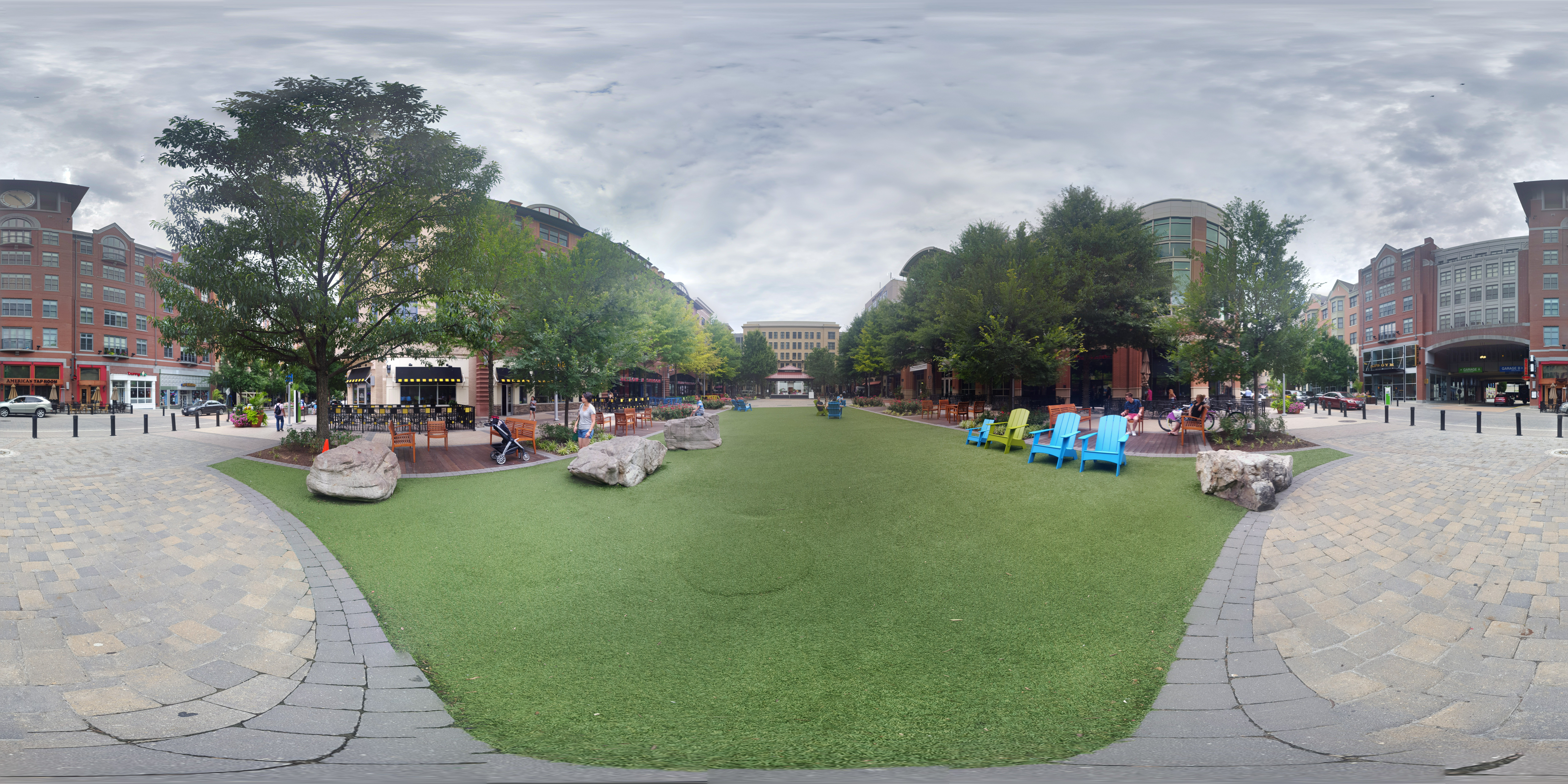
360 panorama of Rockville Town Center

In 1962, Rockville became the first small city in Maryland to undertake a federal urban renewal program. Forty-six acres in the town center were bought; old and new buildings were demolished, and street patterns were changed. In their place rose the residential Americana Centre, more county buildings, high-rise offices, and a large shopping mall with 1,560 spaces of underground parking. A decade after the project began, the 500,000-square-foot (46,000 m^{2}), 40 shop Rockville Mall opened in 1972, on 13 acres (53,000 m^{2}).

Although designed originally to have Sears and JCPenney as the two anchors, no second lease was ever signed. The sole anchor at opening was a branch of the Washington, D.C.–based Lansburgh's department store chain. Within a year, Lansburgh's closed and was replaced briefly with a branch of Lit Brothers, followed by a W. & J. Sloane furniture clearance center and Franklin Simon & Co. store. Those stores closed with the bankruptcy of City Stores in 1979.

The mall was renamed in 1978 as the Commons at Courthouse Square and by 1981, 35 of the 55 store fronts were vacant. That year, despite the opening of the adjacent Montgomery County Executive Office Building, tenancy eventually dwindled to a handful, the property's New York–based owner, Rockville Development Associates, went bankrupt, and the mall was closed.

In 1983, Eisinger-Kilbane of Gaithersburg, Maryland, spent $50 million attempting to redevelop it as a more entertainment-oriented facility. It was reopened as Rockville Metro Center, reflecting the connection at its east end to the newly opened Rockville Metro station across Maryland Route 355. This renovation brought in the late 1980s a large United Artists theater complex and "Breakers," a billiards parlor. Though these businesses, at the east end of the mall closest to the Metro station, attracted some traffic, the remainder of the mall lacked attractive tenants and therefore remained largely vacant.

Rockville Mayor and later Montgomery County executive Doug Duncan launched a massive campaign against the mall, known locally as the "Berlin Wall", in 1993, arguing that the large, scarcely occupied facility was a millstone holding back downtown development and limiting the city's property tax intake. His argument struck a chord with the majority in Rockville, and the west end of the mall was finally torn down in 1995 (the portion connected to the Metro station still exists as an office/health care/fitness center complex that is not recognizable as having once been part of a mall). By 1996, a park was constructed on the site around the old courthouse building and the movie complex. New York–based Essex Capital Partners purchased the mall from Marine Midland Bank in 1998. Later that year, they opened the first phase of the $300 million Rockville Center project, which included renovated and expanded theaters and a "restaurant row."

Starting in 2004, redevelopment continued with the 60-acre (240,000 m^{2}) Rockville Town Center project. The $370 million mixed use center, is a public / private venture and includes the Rockville Branch of the Montgomery County Library; Rockville Arts and Innovation Center; ground-level retail, restaurants, shops, food stores; public parking garages; and about 680 units of residential housing in a pedestrian friendly setting.

On July 17, 2007, the 12-acre (49,000 m^{2}) Rockville Town Square, now The Square Rockville (Phase I of the Rockville Town Center project) opened with 27 shops and restaurants, including a Gordon Biersch brewery, Gifford's Ice Cream and an Aveda day spa which have all been closed. In September 2007, the 28,000 square feet (2,600 m^{2}) nonprofit Metropolitan Center for the Visual Arts (VisArts), a former Rockville Mall tenant, opened its doors as a center for classes, galleries and programs.

=== Gallery ===
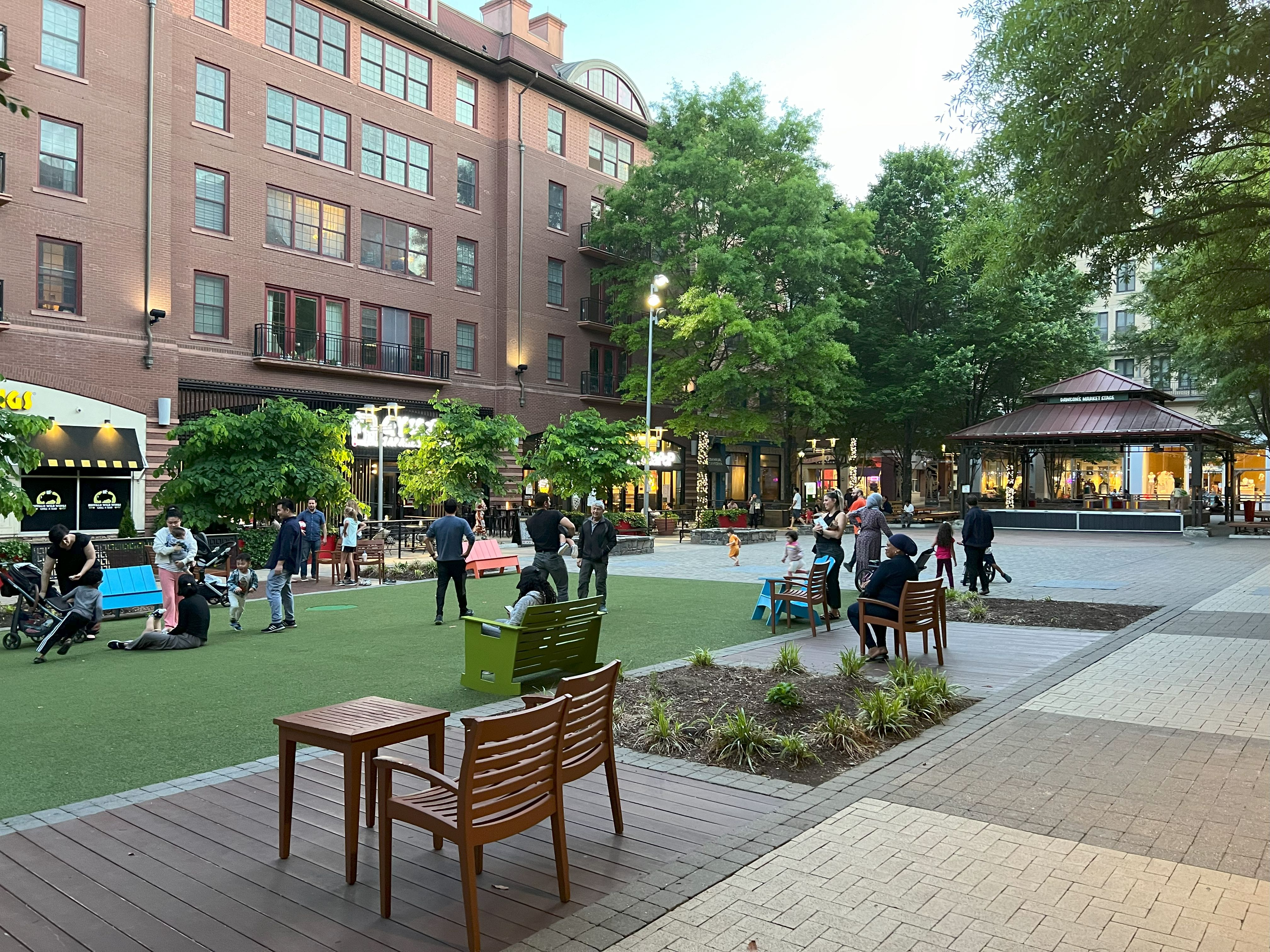
Back of Rockville Town Square stage area

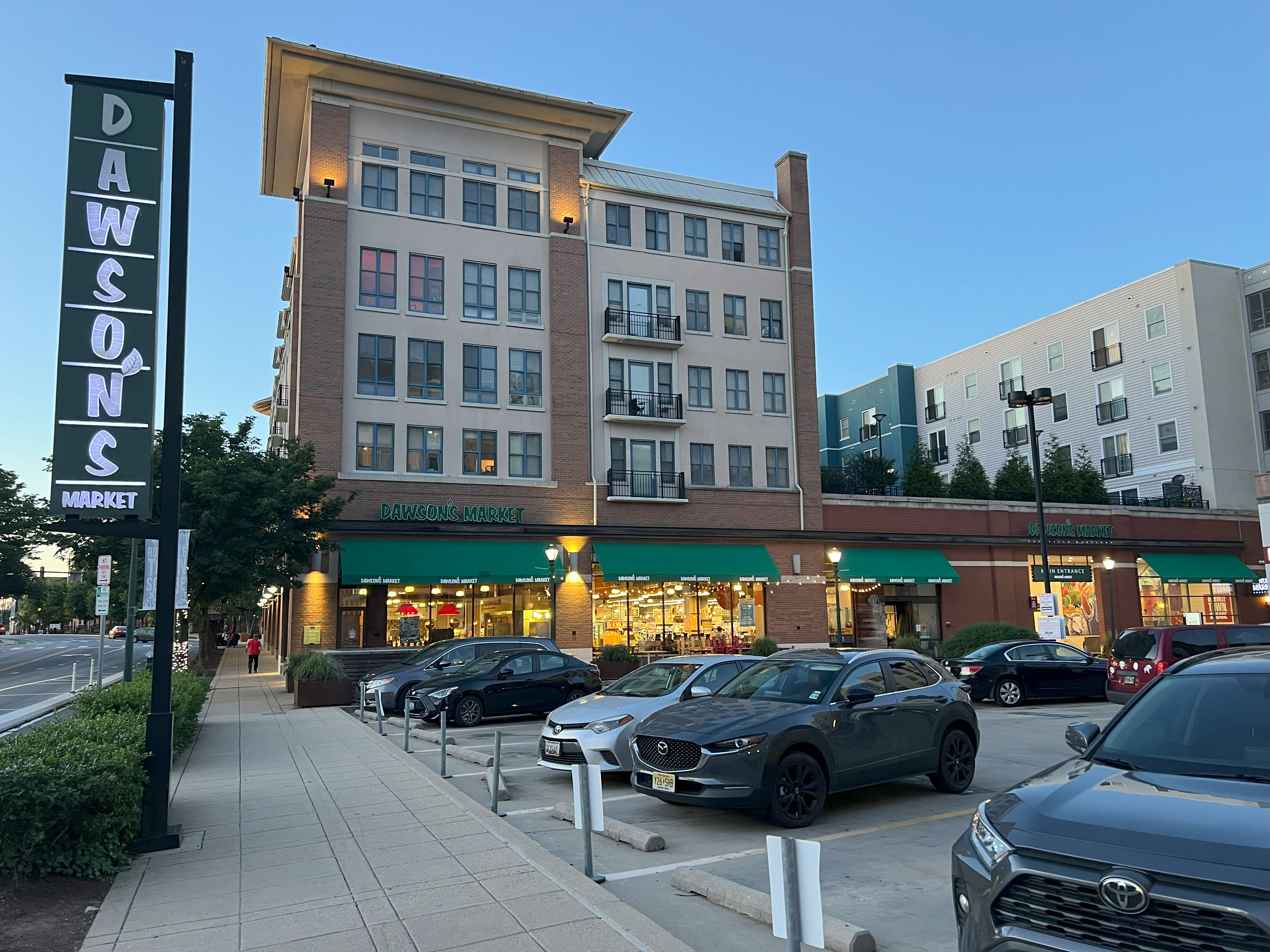
Dawson's Market

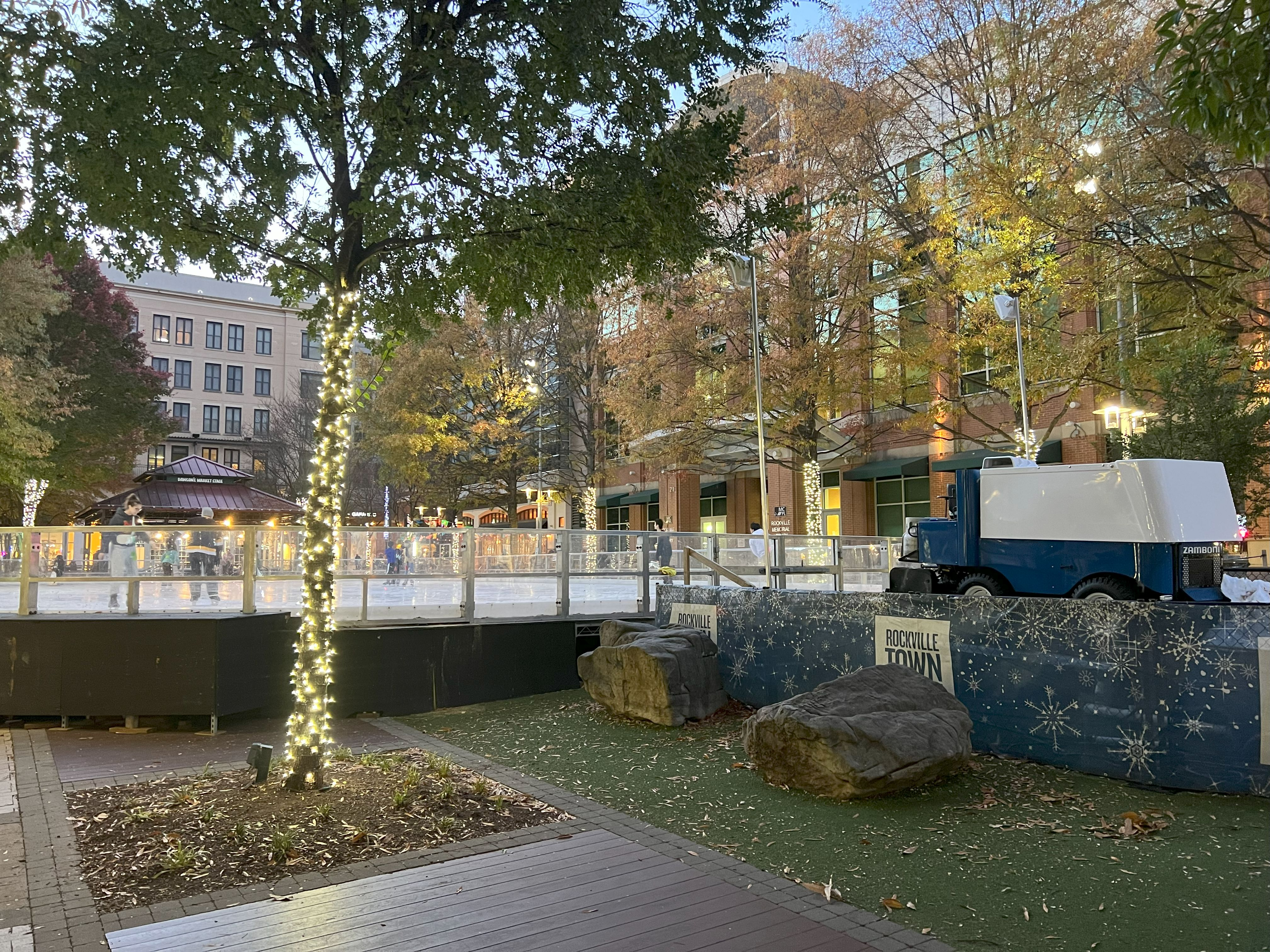
Rockville Town Square Ice Rink

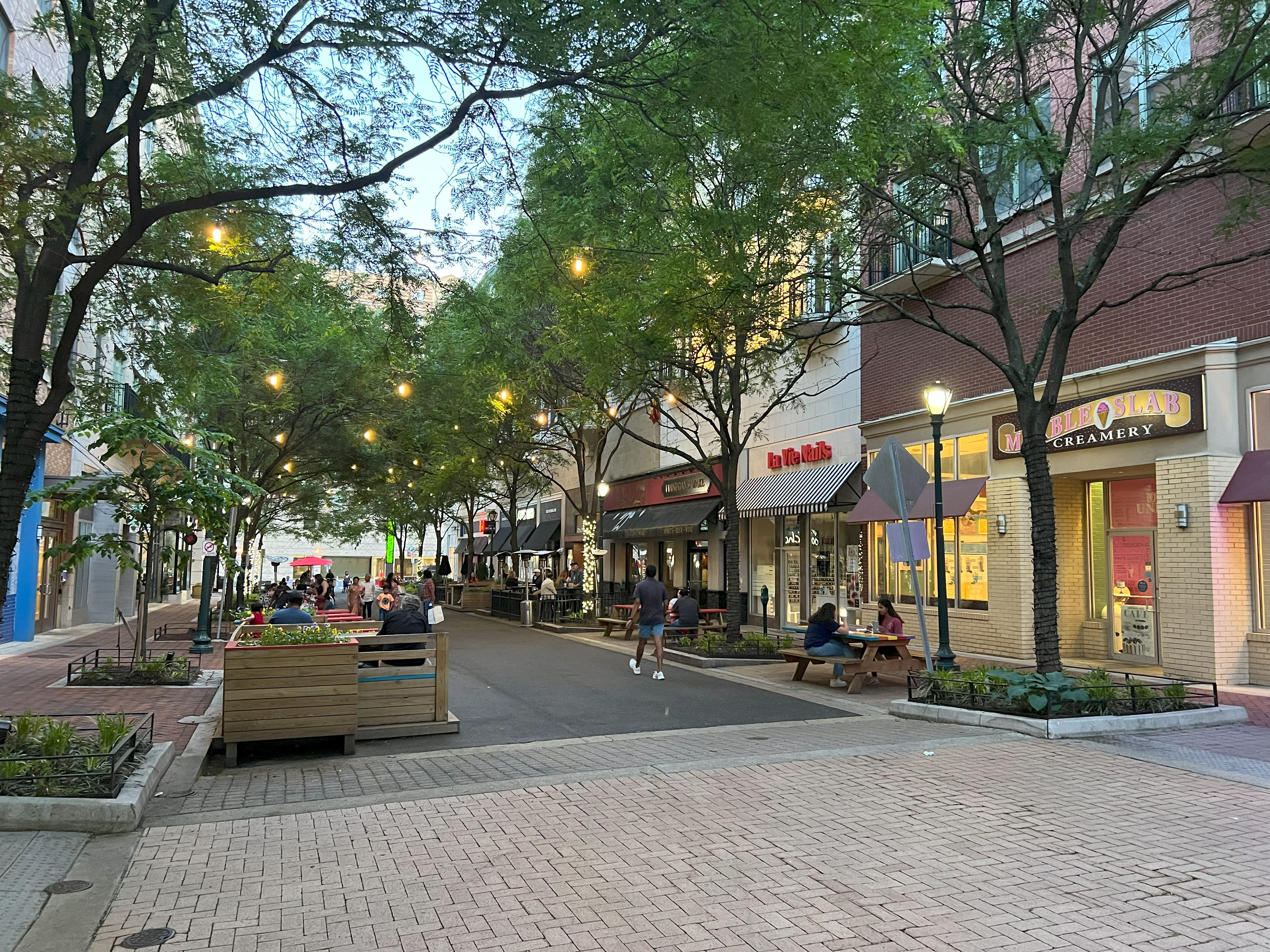
Rockville Town Square closed off street

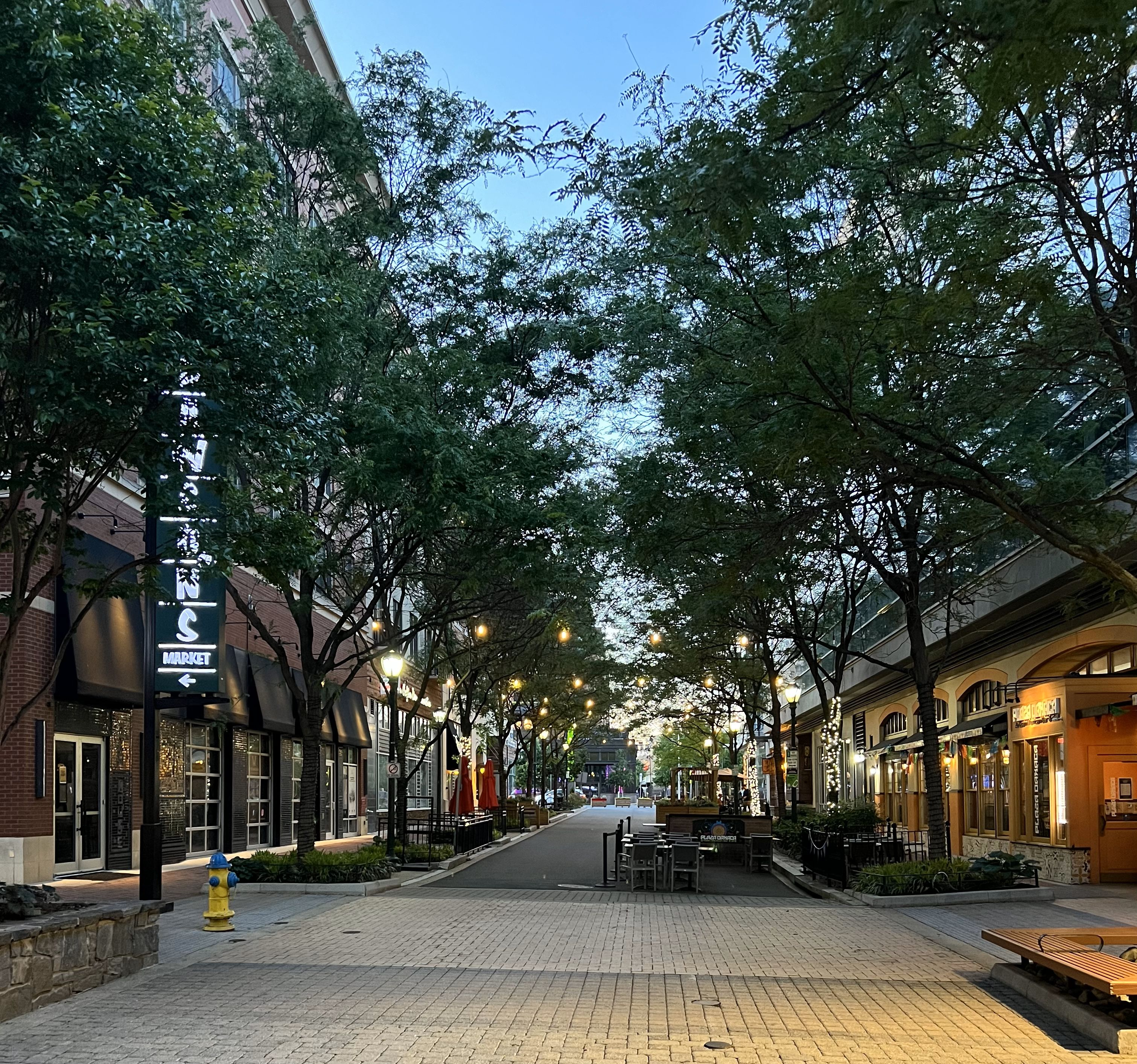
Rockville Town Square street Dawson's Side

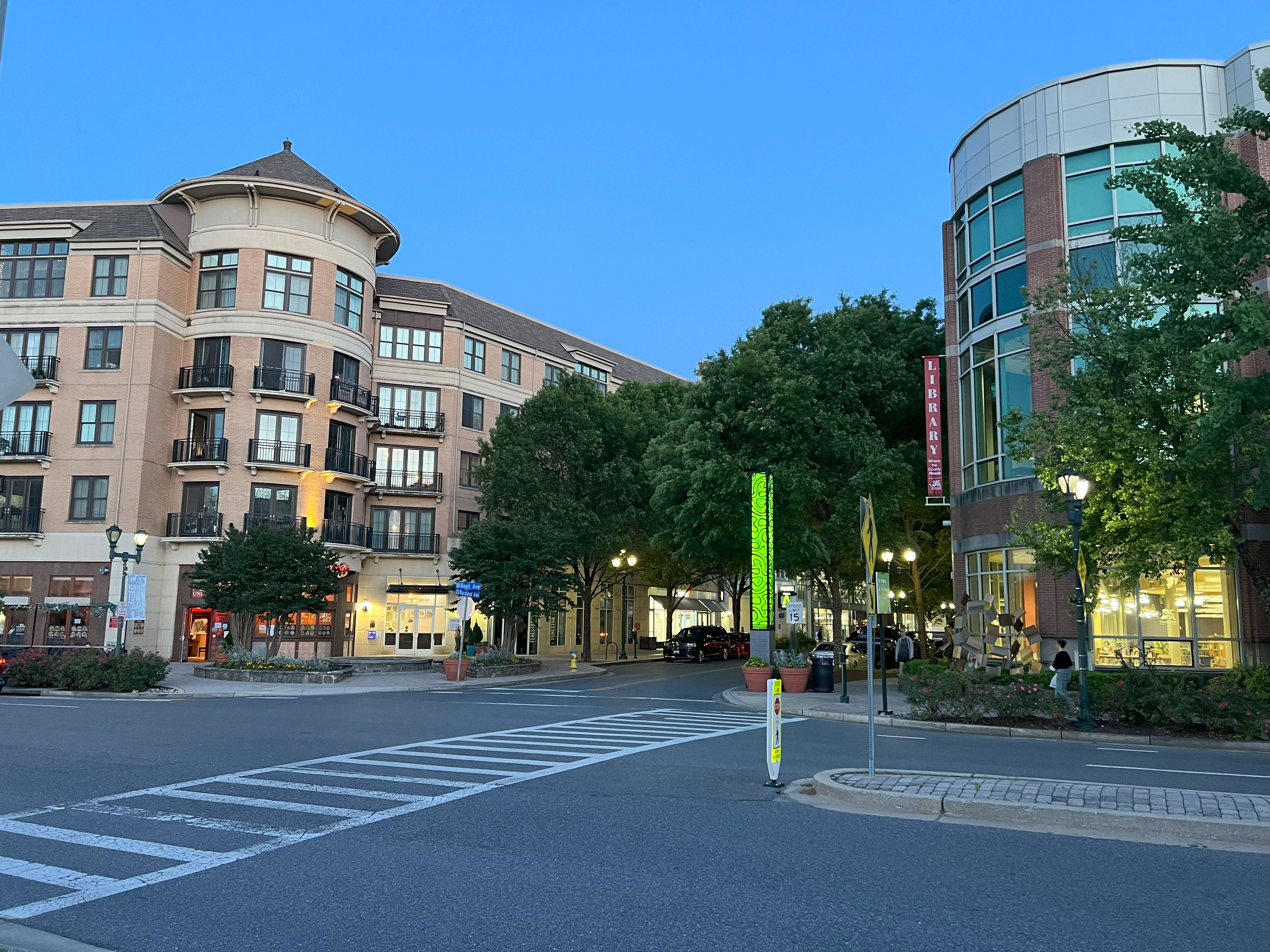
Rockville Town Square and Rockville Library

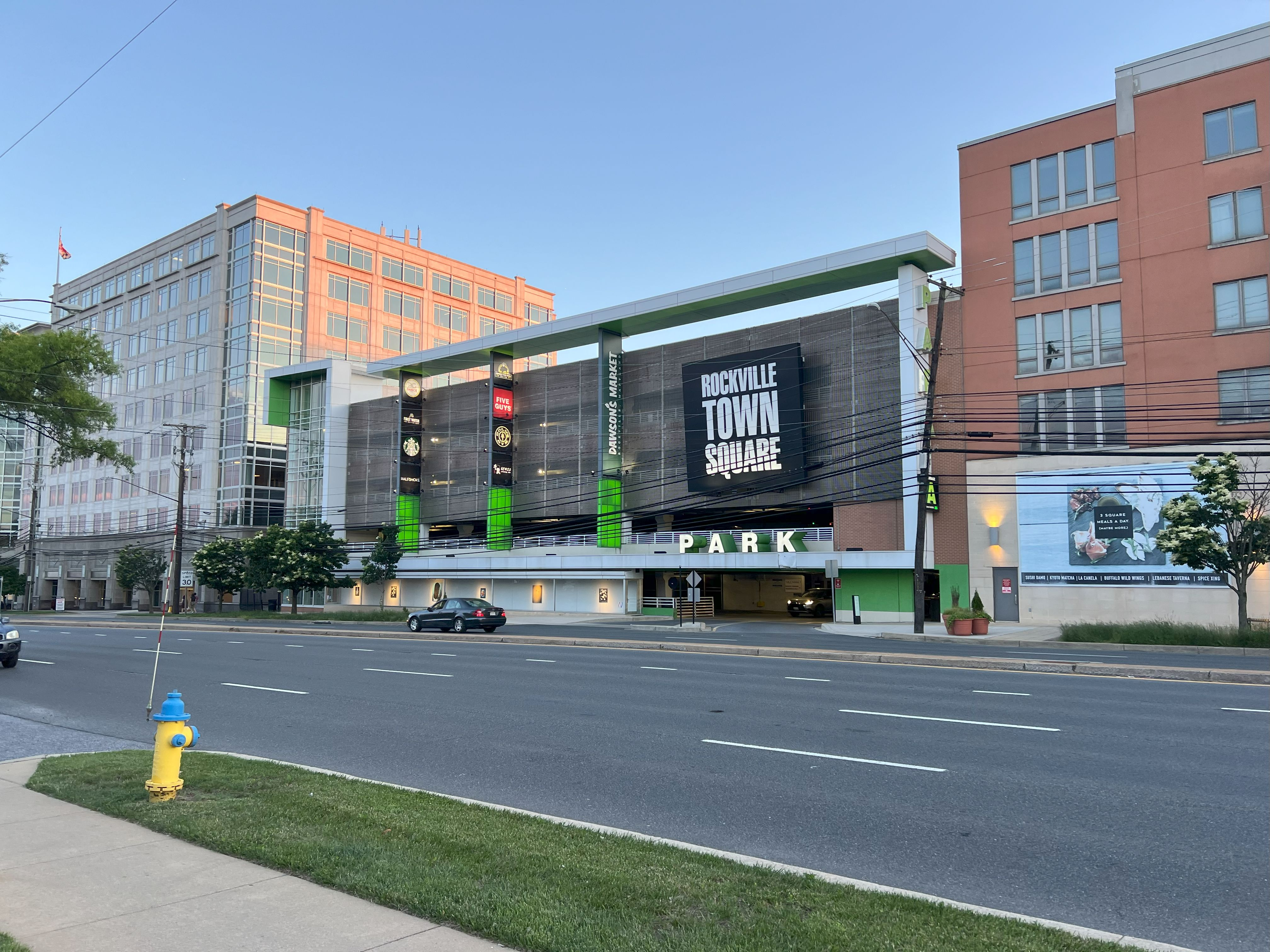
Back of Rockville Town Square
