= Andrew Nash Gifford =

American publisher

- Born: 1974 (age 51–52); Washington, D.C.
- Education: Bethesda-Chevy Chase High School; Davis & Elkins College

Andrew Nash Gifford (born 1974) is an American publisher born in Washington, D.C. He is most known for founding Santa Fe Writers Project, an independent press. Gifford is also the author of the memoir We All Scream which details his family story; Gifford is the grandson of John Nash Gifford, the founder of Gifford's Ice Cream & Candy Co.

== Early life ==
The son of a prominent Washington, D.C. area family, Andrew Gifford was the heir to the Gifford family ice cream empire before his father, Robert Gifford destroyed the business with a faulty franchising scheme. Robert Gifford disappeared in the wake of bankruptcy proceeding. Andrew Gifford's mother, Barbara, was fanatically religious and fascinated by Charles Manson. Both parents were alcoholic, and the household was abusive. Gifford has written extensively about his life in his memoir, and his criticisms of his family have not always been well received.

== Publishing career ==
Inspired by zine culture, and in particular Pagan Kennedy, in 1989 Gifford founded his first publishing company, Purple Publications, which had to be shut down while Gifford was in college and struggling with Trigeminal neuralgia. He went on to be an editor of Associated Press wires and a developmental editor at the American Psychological Association; however, during this period, Gifford was depressed. During a trip to visit family in Santa Fe, New Mexico his uncle, the writer Richard Currey encouraged him to get back into publishing. In 1998, Gifford founded Santa Fe Writers Project. (SFWP)

As of 2018, Gifford's publishing company SFWP had been continuously operating for twenty years. In addition, books published by the press have been nominated and received numerous awards, and have been reviewed positively by publishing trade media like Kirkus Reviews, Publishers Weekly, and Booklist.

In 2020, he spoke with Real Fiction Radio about some of his many experiences as a writer and publisher.
