= Leslie Steiner =

Leslie Steiner may refer to:

- Leslie Morgan Steiner, American author
- Leslie Howard (Leslie Howard Steiner, 1893–1943), English actor, director, producer and writer
- Samuel R. Delany (born 1942), who wrote under K. Leslie Steiner
