= Gifford's Ice Cream & Candy Co. =

American ice cream brand

- Company type: Specialty ice cream and yogurts
- Industry: Retail
- Founded: September 11, 1938; 87 years ago in Silver Spring, Maryland, United States
- Founder: John Nash Gifford
- Defunct: October 20, 2010
- Fate: Dissolved
- Successor: Gifford's Ice Cream of Maine
- Products: Ice Cream
- Owner: Marcelo Ramagem and Neal Lieberman

Gifford's was a brand of ice cream manufactured and sold in the Washington, D.C., area from the 1930s through 2010. It was known for using natural ingredients including viscosity modifiers such as guar gum and seaweed-derived carrageenan and having a high butterfat content.

== History ==
Gifford's Ice Cream & Candy Co. was founded in May 1938 by John Nash Gifford, George Milroy, John L. Tillotson, Leslie J. Daley, and Mary Frances Gifford. The original incorporation was on September 11, 1938. The first store was opened at 8101 Georgia Avenue in Silver Spring, Maryland, where Gifford's sold six original ice cream flavors. In 1940, the company opened a second location on Wisconsin Avenue in Bethesda. By 1956, there were five locations in the DC area. Until 1985, all Gifford's locations were large, old-fashioned ice cream parlors. John Gifford served as the company's president until his death in 1976, when the business was passed on to Mary Frances Gifford and George Milroy. When Mary Frances died in 1980, John's son Robert Nash Gifford took over.

In April 1984, Gifford's filed for bankruptcy protection due to approximately $200,000 of debt. In 1985, a Baltimore bankruptcy judge ruled to liquidate the company's assets to pay an estimated $350,000 debt. At that time, the Gifford's name, logo, and a version of the recipes were purchased for $1,500.

In 1987, Dolly Hunt and her son, James, bought the rights to the company and opened a new Gifford's on Woodmont Avenue in Bethesda, MD, which had its official opening on July 4, 1989. The Hunts sold their shares in 1999 to Marcelo Ramagem, who partnered with Neal Lieberman. In July 2006, a new 8,200-square-foot (760 m^{2}) factory was opened.

Select flavors of Gifford's ice cream were sold in pint containers in area specialty food stores, including Whole Foods Market and Harris Teeter. As of August 2006, more than 70 restaurants in the Washington, D.C. metropolitan area served Gifford's ice cream. Beginning in 2008, Gifford's was added as a concession at Nationals Park. It was replaced by Breyers in 2011.

The company was sold in March 2010, and split into two parts, wholesale and retail. Due to arguments and lawsuits regarding the sale of generic Hood's Ice Cream instead of Gifford's at the retail locations, all the retail locations were closed by October 2010. The trademark and name were then purchased by the unrelated Gifford's Ice Cream of Maine.

== Legacy ==
Of the original Washington, D.C. family, the only surviving member is Robert's son, Andrew Nash Gifford, who currently runs the indie publishing house SFWP. He is also the author of the memoir, We All Scream: The Fall of the Gifford's Ice Cream Empire, which was released on May 1 of 2017. The book details the rise and fall of the Washington-area Gifford's Ice Cream and the family behind it and provides details on the original Gifford's base mix and technique.
