= Jennifer Eaton Gökmen =

American writer and editor (born 1971)

Jennifer Eaton Gokmen
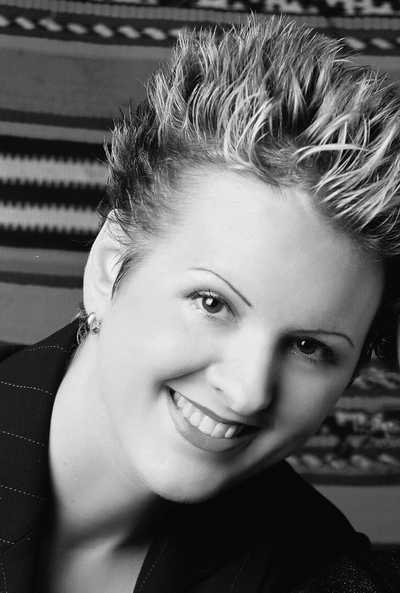
- Born: January 31, 1971 (age 55); Wayne, Michigan
- Occupation: Writer

Jennifer Eaton Gökmen (born 1971) is an American-Turkish writer and editor. She has contributed to several magazines and newspapers, including TimeOut Istanbul. Much of her work has focused on her status as an immigrant to Turkey. She was the co-host of the documentary series Bir Yar Gelir Bizlere, and she was co-editor of Tales from the Expat Harem, both about expatriation to Turkey. In 2006, she was awarded the Daughters of Atatürk "Woman of Distinction Award".

== Background ==
Gökmen was born in Wayne, Michigan, graduated from Brentwood High School in Brentwood, Tennessee, in 1989, and received her B.A. from Western Michigan University in Creative Writing and American and British Literature from Western Michigan University in 1994.

Gökmen has lived in Istanbul with her Turkish husband since 1994. She is the daughter-in-law of Turkish politician Dr. Sami Gökmen, former Member of Parliament from the Republican People's Party (CHP) for the district of Muğla during the 16th session of the Turkish Grand National Assembly (TBMM).

== Career ==
Gökmen has been a regular contributor to TimeOut Istanbul magazine and Turkish national daily newspapers Hurriyet Daily News and Today's Zaman. Her writing has appeared in National Geographic Traveler and Perceptive Travel.

In 2007 Gökmen co-hosted a Turkish television series focusing on expatriation issues of foreigners married to Turks, "Bir Yar Gelir Bizlere", on the state television station TRT (Turkish Radio and Television Corporation).

Gökmen, along with Anastasia M. Ashman, created and edited the nonfiction anthology Tales from the Expat Harem: Foreign Women in Modern Turkey. The collection includes the life experiences of 32 expatriate women from seven nations and five continents, whose collective experience spans the length and breadth of Turkey over the past four decades. Stories by scholars, artists, missionaries, journalists, entrepreneurs and Peace Corps volunteers relate personal assimilation into Turkish friendship, neighborhood, wifehood, and motherhood.

Tales from the Expat Harem is also published in Turkey, where it was a #1 national bestseller in January 2006. It has been translated into Turkish under the title Türkçe Sevmek, with a foreword by the controversial Turkish novelist Elif Shafak.

The author, along with co-editor Anastasia M. Ashman, was interviewed on NBC's Today, on its occasional travel segment Where in the World is Matt Lauer? in May 2008.

== Works ==
- Doğan Kitap, Turkish publisher of Tales from the Expat Harem and Turkish version, Türkçe Sevmek
- Seal Press, North American publisher of Tales from the Expat Harem

== Awards and honors ==
- Gökmen and her co-editor Anastasia M. Ashman were honored with the 2006 Daughters of Atatürk "Woman of Distinction Award", a title that is bestowed annually on selected women who have "demonstrated vision, leadership, innovation and professionalism" in "giving their talents to the international Turkish community". Other 2006 honorees include Güler Sabancı, Caroline Finkel, and Leslie Peirce.
