= Santiago Files =

- Directed by: Cetywa Powell
- Written by: Cetywa Powell
- Starring: Ariel Dorfman; Isabel Allende; Judd Kessler
- Narrated by: Malcolm McDowell
- Cinematography: Ammon Ehrisman; Tim Laurel
- Edited by: Drew Lahat
- Music by: Paul Foss
- Release date: September 23, 2011
- Running time: 70 minutes
- Country: United States
- Language: English

Santiago Files, directed by Cetywa Powell, is a feature-length documentary film about Salvador Allende's topple from Chile's unstable government and the players in his downfall: the CIA, Chile's military, and Allende himself. Malcolm McDowell narrates the film, which premiered in September 2011.

The documentary is in the permanent collection of the American Documentary Film Festival's archives (AmDocs), housed at the Rancho Mirage Library in Palm Springs.

== Film festivals, screenings, and availability ==
- American Documentary Film Festival's Archives (AmDocs), Rancho Mirage Public Library, Palm Springs (June 2013)
- Humanity Explored Film Festival (December 2012)
- Santa Cruz Film Festival (May 2012)
- Landmark Theatres Nuart (October 2011)
- International Crime And Punishment Film Festival, Istanbul, Turkey (September 23–30, 2011)

== Subject matter ==
CIA documents on Salvador Allende were released to the public in 2000. Santiago Files tells its story through CIA documents, taped conversations with Richard Nixon discussing Allende, interview clips with former Director of the CIA, Richard Helms, interview clips with Henry Kissinger, and interview clips with Salvador Allende.

"The most memorable conclusion I can recall from the film [Santiago Files], was that Allende had been a leader – and whenever a leader arises in Latin America, the US finds a way to get rid of him. We played a role, but the Chileans made this happen. We invested $10 million in supporting opposition groups and media. Even in that time, it wasn't very much. The fact is that after the decisions he made in the first year, time was not on his side. Unless he could control his own coalition – which he couldn't – the downward cycle was just going to continue." - Judd L. Kessler (Regional Legal Advisor at the U.S. Embassy, 1970–1973)

== Contributors ==
- Ariel Dorfman, Chilean author and playwright, Salvador Allende's cultural advisor (1970–1973)
- Isabel Allende, Chilean author, Salvador Allende's niece
- Judd L. Kessler, Regional Legal Advisor at the US Embassy in Chile (1970–1973)
