= Lilly Dancyger =

American nonfiction author

- Born: 1988 (age 37–38); Buffalo, New York, U.S.
- Education: The New School (BA); Columbia University (MA)
- Occupation: Writer
- Writing career
- Genre: nonfiction
- Notable works: Negative Space (2021); First Love: Essays on Friendship (2024)
- Website: www.lillydancyger.com

Lilly Dancyger (born 1988) is an American author and editor. She is the author of the memoirs Negative Space and First Love: Essays on Friendship, as well as editor of the anthology Burn It Down: Women Writing About Anger. Her essays have been published by Literary Hub, The New York Times, Elle, Slate, and Brevity, among other outlets. She writes the newsletter The Word Cave.

== Early life and education ==
Lilly Dancyger was born in Buffalo, New York. She grew up in New York City and the San Francisco Bay Area. She dropped out of Bard High School Early College at the age of 14 and earned a GED.

She later graduated from Eugene Lang College of Liberal Arts at The New School with a BA in Literary Studies. She received an MA in Journalism from Columbia University Graduate School of Journalism.

== Career ==
Dancyger was the Memoir Editor at Narratively from 2014-2020, during which time she also worked as a freelance journalist, writing for outlets such as Rolling Stone, Glamour, The Cut, and others.

Her 2021 memoir, Negative Space, details her investigation into her father's life, who had an addiction to heroin and died prematurely, through the art he created. Gabino Iglesias from NPR and Claire Rudy Foster from The Rumpus both praised the work's nonlinear narrative and exploration of grief. Negative Space was selected by Carmen Maria Machado as a winner of the Santa Fe Writers Project Literary Awards. In 2021, Dancyger was named a "Writer to Watch" by BookPage.

In 2023, Dancyger received an Artist Fellowship in Creative Nonfiction from the New York Foundation for the Arts.

Her second book, First Love: Essays on Friendship, a memoir-in-essays, was published in 2024 by The Dial Press. Ann Levin from Associated Press described the work as "vivid, thoughtful, and nuanced." Julia Shipley from The Philadelphia Inquirer also gave the collection a positive review. The book was a finalist for the 2025 Lambda Literary Award for Bisexual Nonfiction.

She currently teaches creative nonfiction in the low-residency MFA program at Randolph College. She has previously taught at Columbia University School of the Arts.

Her next book, Muscle Memory, is forthcoming from Autofocus Books in 2027.

== Personal life ==
Dancyger lives in New York City.

== Bibliography ==
=== Nonfiction ===
- Negative Space (2021) Santa Fe Writers Project
- First Love: Essays on Friendship (2024) The Dial Press
- Muscle Memory (2027) Autofocus Books

=== Anthology ===
- Burn It Down: Women Writing About Anger (editor) (2019) Seal Press
