= Dirty Hands (2008 drama film) =

- Written by: Cetywa Powell
- Distributed by: Arclight Films (International)
- Release date: 2008
- Country: United States
- Language: English

Dirty Hands is a 2008 political drama. The story shows war's cyclical nature and the psychological and human destruction ultimately caused to both sides.

== Plot ==
Five Middle Eastern captives fight to retain their sanity and dignity in the face of their American interrogators, who in turn struggle with demons of their own.

== Cast and crew ==
- Consultant: U.S. Army Interrogator Colonel Robert Klein (Army interrogator in Iraq and Afghanistan; combat veteran in Iraq and Panama)
- Casting Director: Mali Finn (The film was one of Finn's last projects as casting director before her retirement.)

== Screenplay awards and nominations ==
- Media Arts Fellowships Screenplay nominee (2007)
- Tribeca All Access screenplay nominee (2005)
- Roy W. Dean Grant Screenplay finalist (2005)
