= Benjamin Cheever =

American writer and editor (born 1948)

- Born: Benjamin Hale Cheever; October 8, 1948 (age 77); United States
- Education: Loomis Chaffee School
- Occupations: Writer, editor
- Spouse: Janet Maslin
- Children: 2
- Parent: John Cheever
- Relatives: Susan Cheever (sister)
- Website: benjaminhcheever.com

Benjamin Hale Cheever (born October 8, 1948) is an American writer and editor. He has written four adult fiction novels, one children's book, and two nonfiction books.

His parents were Mary Winternitz and writer John Cheever His sister is writer Susan Cheever.

== Selected works ==
Books

- Cheever, Benjamin (1992); Plagiarist; Simon & Schuster; ISBN 0689121539
- Cheever, Benjamin (1994); The Partisan; Simon & Schuster; ISBN 0689121741
- Cheever, Benjamin (1994); Famous After Death; Bloomsbury USA; ISBN 9780609600054
- Cheever, Benjamin (2004); The Good Nanny; Bloomsbury USA; ISBN 9781596911208
- Cheever, Benjamin (2009); The First Dog; Bad Dog Publishing; ISBN 0615300146
- Cheever, Benjamin (2002); Selling Ben Cheever: Back to Square One in a Service Economy. Bloomsbury USA; ISBN 1582341583
- Cheever, Benjamin (2007); Strides: Running Through History with an Unlikely Athlete; Rodale Books; ISBN 1594862281

As editor

- Cheever, John (2009); The Letters of John Cheever; Simon & Schuster; ISBN 1439164649

== Personal life ==
Cheever lives in Pleasantville, New York.

== See also ==
- List of American novelists
- List of children's literature writers
- List of Loomis Chaffee School alumni
- List of people from New York (state)
