= John Fulkerson (surgeon) =

American orthopedic and sports medicine surgeon

John P. Fulkerson
- Born: December 9, 1946 (age 79)
- Education: Williams College (BA, cum laude); Yale University (MD, with honors)
- Occupations: Orthopedic surgeon; sports medicine surgeon
- Known for: Anteromedialized tibial tubercle osteotomy ("Fulkerson osteotomy"); quadriceps free tendon ACL reconstruction; medial quadriceps tendon-femoral ligament reconstruction
- Medical career
- Institutions: Yale School of Medicine, Yale Medicine, Orthopedic Associates of Hartford, University of Connecticut School of Medicine

John P. Fulkerson (born December 9, 1946) is an American orthopedic and sports medicine surgeon and professor of orthopaedics and rehabilitation at Yale School of Medicine. He specializes in patellofemoral disorders, patellar instability, and sports knee surgery.

Fulkerson is best known for describing anteromedialization of the tibial tuberosity in 1983, a procedure later widely referred to as the Fulkerson osteotomy. He also published early work on quadriceps tendon ACL grafting, including all-soft-tissue central quadriceps free tendon techniques that later AANA and review literature identified as important antecedents of contemporary quadriceps tendon autograft reconstruction.

He has also been credited with describing medial quadriceps tendon-femoral ligament reconstruction for patellar instability and, later in his career, helping advance three-dimensional imaging and printing for patellofemoral surgical planning at Yale.

== Education ==
Fulkerson received a BA, cum laude, from Williams College and an MD, with honors, from Yale University in 1972.

After medical school, Fulkerson completed internship and residency training through Yale, followed by two years of government service with the U.S. Indian Health Service between internship and residency.

== Career ==
Fulkerson spent much of his career in Connecticut. After completing training he joined the University of Connecticut School of Medicine in 1978 and later became professor there. Subsequent public profiles describe him as having spent several decades at UConn before moving to Yale, where Yale Medicine currently lists him as professor of orthopaedics and rehabilitation.

His Yale and Patellofemoral Foundation biographies describe him as a past head team physician for the Hartford Whalers of the National Hockey League from 1989-1997, the Hartford Wolf Pack of the American Hockey League from 1998-2007, and as a team physician for U.S. Olympic men's ice hockey from 1993-1994.

Fulkerson co-founded the International Patellofemoral Study Group in 1995 and later founded the Patellofemoral Foundation in 2003. He has served as president of the Patellofemoral Foundation since its founding.

== Research and contributions ==
Fulkerson's research and clinical work have centered on the patellofemoral joint, anterior knee pain, patellar instability, and ligament reconstruction. In early papers he emphasized close evaluation of the peripatellar retinaculum in patients with patellofemoral pain and reported histologic evidence of retinacular nerve injury associated with patellofemoral malalignment.

=== Tibial tubercle osteotomy ===
In 1983, Fulkerson described an oblique osteotomy that permitted combined anterior and medial transfer of the tibial tubercle. Later reviews identify this operation as the "Fulkerson osteotomy" and describe the Fulkerson anteromedialization as a central or "workhorse" modern tibial tubercle osteotomy technique for selected patellofemoral disorders.

Fulkerson and colleagues later published additional clinical work refining this approach, including a 1990 series on anteromedial tibial tubercle transfer without bone graft.

=== Quadriceps tendon ACL reconstruction ===
In ACL surgery, Fulkerson and Rolf Langeland published a 1995 paper describing the central quadriceps tendon as an alternative cruciate ligament graft. Fulkerson then published a 1998 paper on the central quadriceps tendon as a graft alternative and a 1999 operative-technique paper specifically describing a bone-free central quadriceps free tendon graft for ACL reconstruction.

Later AANA and review literature have treated this work as an important precursor of current quadriceps tendon autograft practice, especially the all-soft-tissue central quadriceps free tendon graft. In that literature, Fulkerson is generally credited not with inventing all quadriceps tendon grafting in the broadest historical sense, but with helping establish the later all-soft-tissue free-tendon variant that resembles modern techniques.

=== Patellar stabilization and 3D imaging ===
In 2013, Fulkerson and Cory Edgar published an operative description of medial quadriceps tendon-femoral ligament reconstruction for prevention of patellar instability. At Yale, he later became closely identified with patellofemoral 3D imaging and printing. Yale states that he launched a Patellofemoral Instability Research Program in 2020, and subsequent publications from the Yale group described 3D printed patellofemoral joint models and 3D tibial tubercle transfer planning.

== Selected publications ==
Citation	Year	Journal
Fulkerson, John P. (1983). "Anteromedialization of the Tibial Tuberosity for Patellofemoral Malalignment". Clinical Orthopaedics and Related Research. 177 (177): 176–181. doi:10.1097/00003086-198307000-00027. PMID 6861394.	1983	Clinical Orthopaedics and Related Research
Fulkerson, John P.; Shea, Kevin P. (1990). "Disorders of Patellofemoral Alignment". The Journal of Bone and Joint Surgery. American Volume. 72 (9): 1424–1429. doi:10.2106/00004623-199072090-00027. PMID 2229126.	1990	The Journal of Bone and Joint Surgery. American Volume
Fulkerson, John P.; Becker, Gerald J.; Meaney, John A.; Miranda, Michael; Folcik, Marilyn A. (1990). "Anteromedial Tibial Tubercle Transfer Without Bone Graft". The American Journal of Sports Medicine. 18 (5): 490–496. doi:10.1177/036354659001800508. PMID 2252090.	1990	The American Journal of Sports Medicine
Fulkerson, John P.; Langeland, Rolf (1995). "An Alternative Cruciate Reconstruction Graft: The Central Quadriceps Tendon". Arthroscopy. 11 (2): 252–254. doi:10.1016/0749-8063(95)90078-0. PMID 7794444.	1995	Arthroscopy
Fulkerson, J.; McKeon, B.; Donahue, B.; Tarinelli, D. (1998). "The Central Quadriceps Tendon as a Versatile Graft Alternative in Anterior Cruciate Ligament Reconstruction: Techniques and Recent Observations". Techniques in Orthopaedics. 13 (4): 367–374. doi:10.1097/00013611-199812000-00006.	1998	Techniques in Orthopaedics
Fulkerson, John P. (1999). "Central Quadriceps Free Tendon for Anterior Cruciate Ligament Reconstruction". Operative Techniques in Sports Medicine. 7 (4): 195–200. doi:10.1016/S1060-1872(99)80026-4.	1999	Operative Techniques in Sports Medicine
Lippe, Julienne; Armstrong, Amy; Fulkerson, John P. (2012). "Anatomic Guidelines for Harvesting a Quadriceps Free Tendon Autograft for Anterior Cruciate Ligament Reconstruction". Arthroscopy. 28 (7): 980–984. doi:10.1016/j.arthro.2012.01.002. PMID 22498044.	2012	Arthroscopy
Fulkerson, John P.; Edgar, Cory (2013). "Medial Quadriceps Tendon-Femoral Ligament: Surgical Anatomy and Reconstruction Technique to Prevent Patella Instability". Arthroscopy Techniques. 2 (2): e125–e128. doi:10.1016/j.eats.2013.01.002. PMC 3716224. PMID 23875137.	2013	Arthroscopy Techniques

He also edited the fourth edition of Disorders of the Patellofemoral Joint (Lippincott Williams & Wilkins, 2004), a textbook repeatedly referenced in his Yale faculty profile.

== Awards and honors ==
Among honors listed by Yale and related professional sources are election to Alpha Omega Alpha while in medical school, the Bantam Award from Trinity College, a Lifetime Achievement Award from the San Francisco Bay Area Knee Society, Connecticut Orthopedist of the Year, the UConn sports medicine fellow educator award, the Patellofemoral Foundation Lifetime Achievement Award, and induction into the American Orthopaedic Society for Sports Medicine Hall of Fame in 2023.
