= Tim Butterworth =

American politician

Member of the New Hampshire House of Representatives from the Cheshire 4th district
- In office 2006–2010

Personal details
- Party: Democratic
- Parent(s): Oliver Butterworth (father); Miriam Butterworth (mother)

Tim Butterworth, also known as Timothy Butterworth, is an American politician. He served as a Democratic member for the Cheshire 4th district of the New Hampshire House of Representatives.
