= Wendy J. Fox =

American writer (born 1979)

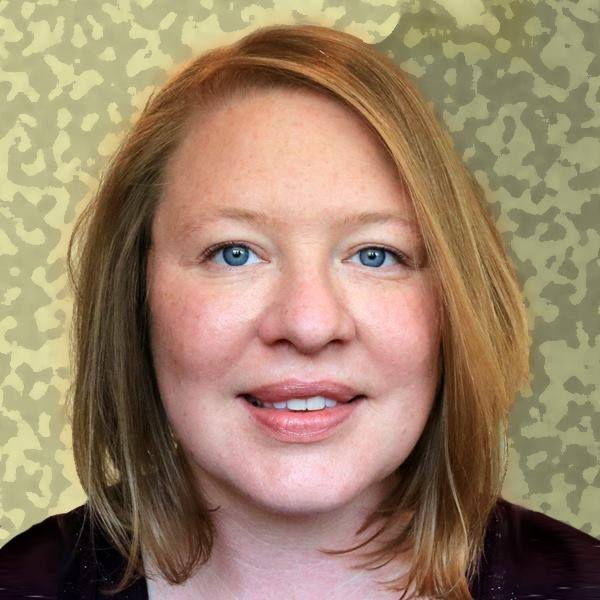
- Born: 1979 (age 46–47); Tonasket, Washington
- Education: Western Washington University; Eastern Washington University
- Occupation: Writer
- Website: wendyjfox.com

Wendy J. Fox (born 1979) is an American author born in Washington. She is most known as a writer of fiction and has thrice been a finalist for the Colorado Book Awards. In 2015, she was nominated for her collection "The Seven Stages of Anger and Other Stories" and in 2020, she was a finalist in literary fiction for "If the Ice Had Held." In 2022, she won for "What If We Were Somewhere Else", a collection of short stories.

Fox has published short stories in ZYZZYVA, Tampa Review, The Pinch, and Washington Square Review, among others. She has also written for popular magazine outlets like Self, Business Insider, and The Rumpus. She was included in 2006's Tales from the Expat Harem, an anthology of female writers based on the experiences of living in Turkey.

She also writes about the intersection of feminism and the workplace for Ms. Magazine

== Early life and education ==
Fox was born and raised in rural eastern Washington state. She attended Tonasket High School and Wenatchee Valley College. She matriculated from Western Washington University and went on to Eastern Washington University, where she earned a Master of Fine Arts.

== Career ==
Until 2019, Fox worked as a marketer for a technology company, and had worked in information technology sector since 2006. She has been outspoken about the need for artists to have a "day job."

== Awards and recognition ==
- Press 53’s inaugural short-fiction competition for her collection "The Seven Stages of Anger and Other Stories."
- "The Pull of It", a novel named a top read by Displaced Nation.
- SFWP's Grand Prize for "If the Ice Had Held"

== Bibliography ==
- The Seven Stages of Anger and Other Stories (2014) Press 53
- The Pull of It (2016) Underground Voices
- If the Ice Had Held (2019) Santa Fe Writers Project
- What If We Were Somewhere Else (2021) Santa Fe Writers Project
