= Cetywa Powell =

American photographer and filmmaker

Cetywa Powell is an American photographer, filmmaker, and literary editor. Her photography has appeared in The New York Times, and her book Meanwhile, here in Austin (2025) was awarded First Place by The BookFest in the "Nonfiction - Travel - Self Discovery" category. She received a bachelor's degree in chemistry from Columbia University.

== Filmography ==
Year	Title	Credited as			
Year	Title	Director	Writer	Producer	
2025	Thirty 84	Yes	Yes	Yes	Feature-Length Animated Film
2021	Riker's Town	Yes	No	Yes	Feature-Length Animated Film
2014	Dawn at Midnight	Yes	Yes	Yes	Feature-length Documentary
2011	Santiago Files	Yes	Yes	Yes	Feature-Length Documentary
2008	Dirty Hands (2008 drama film)	No	Yes	Yes	Feature-Length Political Drama

== Photography ==
Powell's photography has been featured in The New York Times and exhibited nationally and internationally, including shows in New York, Florida, Dallas, London, Italy, France, Vietnam, and Athens. Her work has also exhibited at the Museum of Flight in Seattle, was selected for National Geographic's Your Shot Daily Dozen, and received recognition from competitions such as the International Photography Awards, Fine Art Photography Awards, London International Creative Competition, and Monovisions Photography Awards.

== Books ==
Powell is the literary editor and publisher at Underground Voices, an indie publishing company.

Author:

- Meanwhile, here in Austin (2025; paperback 978-0998892375)
- Dirty Hands screenplay (2016; paperback 978–0990433187)

Editor:

- Red Moon District (2013; paperback 978–0983045663)
- From the UV Files (2012; paperback 978–0983045632)
- Hotel Oblivion (2011; paperback 978–0983045625)
- Last Train To Noir City (2010; paperback 978-0-9830456-0-1)
- Chewing the Fat (2009; paperback 978–0615314754)
- Underground Voices: a collection of short stories (2006; paperback 978-0595380923)
