= Tales from the Expat Harem =

2006 book edited by Anastasia M. Ashman and Jennifer Eaton Gökmen

Tales from the Expat Harem: Foreign Women in Modern Turkey
- Author: Anastasia M. Ashman and Jennifer Eaton Gökmen
- Language: English and Turkish
- Subject: Travel
- Genre: Non-fiction
- Publisher: Seal Press and Doğan Kitap
- Publication date: 2006
- Publication place: United States and Turkey
- Media type: Print (Hardback)
- ISBN: 975-293-381-5
- OCLC: 61285623
- Dewey Decimal: 956.104/086/91 22
- LC Class: DR432 .T29 2006

Tales from the Expat Harem: Foreign Women in Modern Turkey (Turkish: Türkçe Sevmek) is a nonfiction anthology by 32 expatriate women about their lives in modern Turkey, published by Seal Press in North America (2006, ISBN 1-58005-155-3) and Doğan Kitap in Turkey (2005, ISBN 975-293-381-5 Turkish edition, ISBN 975-293-372-6 English edition).

Edited by Anastasia M. Ashman and Jennifer Eaton Gökmen, two American writers based in Istanbul, it was an English language #1 national bestseller in Turkey in January 2006. Its Turkish edition, Türkçe Sevmek: Türkiye'de Yaşayan Yabancı Kadınların Gözüyle Türkler, contains a foreword written by the Turkish novelist Elif Shafak.

In May 2008, the book and its editors were featured on NBC's Today, on its occasional travel segment Where in the World is Matt Lauer?.

== Contributing writers ==
| Amanda Coffin | Erica Kaya | Nancy Lunsford |
| Ana Carolina Fletes | Eveline Zoutendijk | Natalie Baker |
| Anastasia M. Ashman | Jennifer Eaton Gokmen | Pat Yale |
| Annie Prior Ozsarac | Jessica Lutz | Rhonda Vander Sluis |
| Catherine Salter Bayar | Karen-Claire Voss | Sally Green |
| Catherine Yigit | Katherine Belliel | Susan Fleming Holm |
| Claire Uhr | Kathleen Hamilton Gundogdu | Tanala OsaYande |
| Dana Gonzalez | Louise Ruskin | Trici Venola |
| Dena Sukaya | Mahira Afridi-Perese | Valerie Tasiran |
| Diane Caldwell | Maria Yarbrough Orhon | Wendy J. Fox |
| Eppie Lunsford | Maureen Basedow |
