= K.E. Semmel =

American author

- Education: Edinboro University of Pennsylvania (BA); Kansas State University (MA)
- Occupations: Writer, literary translator
- Writing career
- Genres: Fiction, literary translation, essays
- Notable work: The Book of Losman (2024)
- Website: www.kesemmel.com

K.E. Semmel is an American author, literary translator, and disability advocate. He is best known for his translations of contemporary Danish and Norwegian literature into English, including works by Jussi Adler-Olsen, Karin Fossum, Simon Fruelund, and Naja Marie Aidt. In 2024, he published his debut novel, The Book of Losman, which explores the intersection of translation and Tourette syndrome. A 2016 National Endowment for the Arts (NEA) Translation Fellow, Semmel is also a prominent voice in the Tourette syndrome community through his writing and public speaking.

== Early life and education ==
Semmel attended Edinboro University of Pennsylvania, where he earned a Bachelor of Arts. He later received a Master of Arts in English from Kansas State University.

== Career ==
Semmel is a prolific translator of contemporary Scandinavian literature. In 2016, he was awarded a National Endowment for the Arts (NEA) Literature Fellowship for Translation.

In addition to translation, Semmel is a fiction writer and essayist. His debut novel, The Book of Losman, was published in 2024 by SFWP. The novel incorporates autobiographical details from Semmel's life, and the life of a translator living with Tourette syndrome. The book was recognized by Debutiful as a noteworthy debut of 2024.

== Advocacy and personal life ==
Semmel has lived in Denmark, where for two years he was employed as a mailman for the Danish postal service, an experience that facilitated his fluency in the Danish language and provided the cultural immersion that informed his later career as a translator and a novelist.

Semmel resides in Scottsville, New York, near Rochester. Having lived with Tourette syndrome since childhood, he is an active advocate for the community. He was a keynote speaker at the 2025 TIC-CON (Tourette Association of America) Conference.

== Published works ==
=== Novels ===
- The Book of Losman SFWP, 2024) ISBN 978-1951631369

=== Selected translations ===
Year	Author	Title	Publisher
2011	Jussi Adler-Olsen	The Absent One	Dutton
2011	Karin Fossum	The Caller	Houghton Mifflin Harcourt
2013	Simon Fruelund	Milk	Santa Fe Writers Project
2014	Naja Marie Aidt	Rock, Paper, Scissors	Two Lines Press
2014	Erik Valeur	The Seventh Child	AmazonCrossing
2015	Thomas Rydahl	The Hermit	Oneworld
2017	Jesper Bugge Kold	The Wall Between	AmazonCrossing
2018	Mathilde Walter Clark	Lone Star	Deep Vellum

=== Essays and short fiction ===
Semmel's short stories and essays have appeared in The Southern Review, Huffington Post, The Washington Post, and World Literature Today. Notable pieces include:

- "How Should Debut Novelists Measure Success?" (The Millions, 2024)
- "Want to Write Better Fiction? Become a Translator" (The Millions, 2024)
- "7 Novels Set in Copenhagen" (Electric Literature, 2024)

== Awards and honors ==
- National Endowment for the Arts (NEA) Translation Fellowship (2016)
- Danish Arts Foundation Grant (Multiple recipient)
