= Susan Cheever =

American author

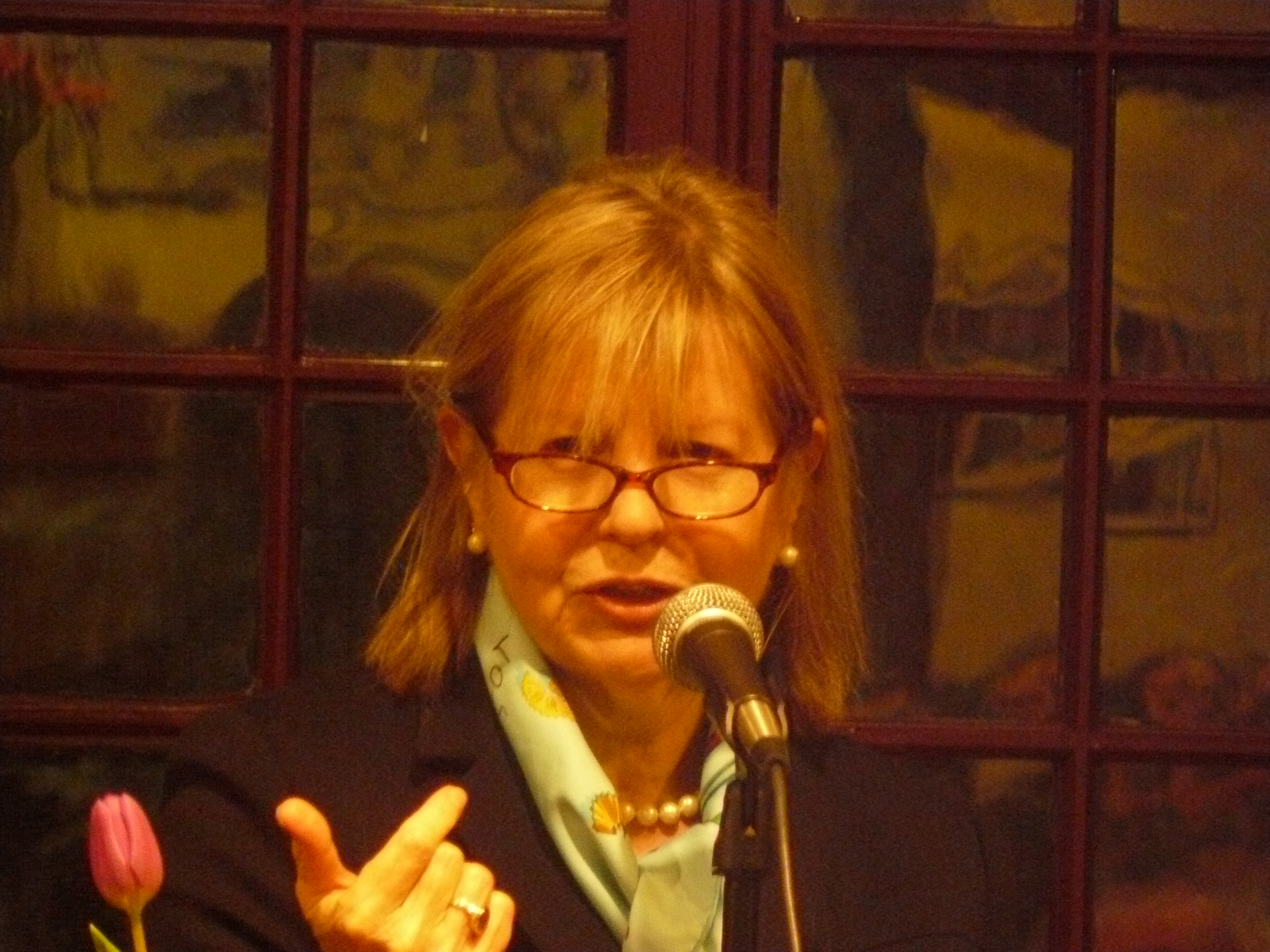
- Born: Susan Cheever; July 31, 1943 (age 83)
- Occupation: Writer: memoirist
- Writing career
- Genres: nonfiction, memoir
- Notable work: Home Before Dark

Susan Cheever (born July 31, 1943) is an American author and a prize-winning best-selling writer well known for her memoir, her writing about alcoholism, and her intimate understanding of American history. She is a recipient of the PEN New England Award. She currently teaches in the MFA program at The New School in New York City.

== Biography ==
Cheever is the daughter of novelist John Cheever and poet/teacher Mary Cheever. She has two brothers, Benjamin Cheever and the late Federico Cheever. Cheever has been married three times and divorced twice. Cheever married Robert Cowley, the son of Malcolm Cowley, in 1967. The couple divorced 8 years later. Cheever's second husband was Calvin Tomkins, II, whom she married in 1981. Cheever and Tomkins have a daughter Sarah. Cheever married her third husband, Warren James Hinckle III, in 1989. Cheever and Hinckle have a son, Warren Hinckle IV, who was born in November 1989.

== Career ==
Cheever's 2025 book, When All the Men Wore Hats (Farrar, Straus and Giroux), investigates the roots of her father's stories, the relationship between truth and fiction, and the secret lives that lie behind the page. Advance reviews have called it "an eloquent and fully immersive portrait of a renowned author" and "remarkable... sui generis... [an] illuminating book."

Cheever's book Drinking in America: Our Secret History was published in 2015. The book chronicles how alcohol has influenced the history of the United States. Her other books include My Name is Bill - Bill Wilson: His Life and the Creation of Alcoholics Anonymous, a biography of Alcoholics Anonymous cofounder Bill Wilson; Home Before Dark, a memoir about her father, novelist John Cheever; Treetops: A Memoir; and five novels: Looking for Work, A Handsome Man, The Cage, Doctors and Women, and Elizabeth Cole. Her essay "Baby Battle," in which she describes immersion in early motherhood and subsequent phases of letting go of her primary identity as a mother, was included in the 2006 anthology Mommy Wars by Leslie Morgan Steiner. Her most recent biography, E.E. Cummings: A Life was reviewed in The New York Times, The New Yorker, and was selected as one of the best books of 2015 by The Economist ("With boundless new detail gathered through meticulous research, Susan Cheever succeeds where most other biographers have failed....") and The San Francisco Chronicle.

Cheever is the author of American Bloomsbury: Louisa May Alcott, Ralph Waldo Emerson, Margaret Fuller, Nathaniel Hawthorne, and Henry David Thoreau: Their Lives, Their Loves, Their Work, published in December 2006. Cheever was a Guggenheim Fellow in 1983. She graduated from Brown University in 1965 and studied American Literature at New York University. She is also a member of the Corporation of Yaddo and serves on the Author's Guild Council. In addition to working on her books, she teaches in the Bennington College M.F.A. program and at The New School.

Cheever is the author of Desire: Where Sex Meets Addiction, which was published in 2008.

== Awards and honors ==
- 1985 L.L. Winship/PEN New England Award, Home Before Dark
- 1985 National Book Critics Circle Award, Nominee
- 1996 The Michael Q. Ford Journalism Award for her Newsday columns, Cheever was part of the Pulitzer Prize winning team
- 2017 PEN/John Kenneth Galbraith Award, Long-listed for Nonfiction Prize

== Bibliography ==
- Looking For Work (1979)
- A Handsome Man (1981)
- The Cage (1982)
- Home Before Dark (1984)
- Doctors & Women (1987)
- Elizabeth Cole (1989)
- Treetops: A Memoir About Raising Wonderful Children in an Imperfect World (1991)
- A Woman's Life: The Story of an Ordinary American and Her Extroardinary Generation (1994)
- Jrnls John Cheever #1 (1995)
- Note Found in a Bottle (1999)
- My Name is Bill: Bill Wilson-- His Life and the Creation of Alcoholics Anonymous (2004)
- American Bloomsbury: Louisa May Alcott, Ralph Waldo Emerson, Margaret Fuller, Nathaniel Hawthorne, and Henry David Thoreau - Their Lives, Their Loves, Their Work (2006)
- Desire: Where Sex Meets Addiction (2008)
- Louisa May Alcott: A Personal Biography (2010)
- E.E. Cummings: A Life (2014)
- Drinking in America: Our Secret History (2016)
- When All the Men Wore Hats (2025)
