= Patricia Fargnoli =

American poet (1937–2021)

Patricia Fargnoli (November 16, 1937 – February 18, 2021) was an American poet and psychotherapist. She was the New Hampshire Poet Laureate from December 2006 to March 2009.

== Biography ==
Fargnoli was an alumna of Trinity College, Hartford College for Women, and the University of Connecticut School of Social Work.

Fargnoli's books of poetry include Necessary Light (Utah State University Press, 1999), winner of the May Swenson Book Award; Lives of Others (Oyster River Press, 2001); Small Songs of Pain (Pecan Grove Press, 2003); Duties of the Spirit (Tupelo Press, 2005) which won the Jane Kenyon Literary Award for Outstanding Poetry by a New Hampshire poet; and, most recently, Then, Something (also from Tupelo Press, 2009), which won the 2009 Foreword Review Best of the Year Silver Award in Poetry.

She was the recipient of a fellowship from the MacDowell Colony. Her poems appeared in magazines and literary journals including Poetry, Ploughshares, Prairie Schooner, The Indiana Review, Underground Voices, Mid-American Review, and Nimrod.

She served as an Associate Editor of The Worcester Review, and taught at The Frost Place, the NH Institute of Art and in the Lifelong Learning Program at Keene State College.

A resident of Walpole, New Hampshire, she was a member of the New Hampshire Arts Council Touring Roster and of the New Hampshire Writers' Project at Southern New Hampshire University.

She had three children: Kenneth, Michael, and Diana; and four grandchildren: Alycia, Joseph Fargnoli, Joshua, and Jessica.

Fargnoli died on February 18, 2021, at the age of 83.

== Sources ==
- Interview: Emprise Review > Dormeuse in Alice in Wonderland: Dialogue with Fiona Sze-Lorrain/Greta Aart > November 2008
- Author's official website: bio
