= Oliver Butterworth (writer) =

American writer and educator (1915–1990)

- Born: 23 May 1915; Hartford, Connecticut
- Died: 17 September 1990 (aged 75); West Hartford, Connecticut
- Occupation: Writer
- Spouse: Miriam Brooks
- Children: 4; including Tim
- Writing career
- Language: English

Oliver Butterworth (May 23, 1915 – September 17, 1990) was an American children's author and educator.

Butterworth was born in Hartford, Connecticut, and spent much of his life as a teacher, teaching at Kent School in Kent, Connecticut, from 1937 to 1947 and Junior School in West Hartford, Connecticut, from 1947 to 1949. Additionally, beginning in 1947, he taught English at Hartford College for Women in Hartford, Connecticut, until the late 1980s.

Butterworth was an author of four children's books, the last of which published posthumously. Three of his books took place in the New England area of the United States in which he was born and raised. His most popular book was The Enormous Egg, the fanciful story of farmboy Nate Twitchell who raises a dinosaur (a triceratops named "Uncle Beazley") that hatches from a hen's egg in 1950s New England.

The premise in Butterworth's book, The Trouble with Jenny's Ear, inspired author Cai Emmons to explore in her award-winning book, Weather Woman, what could happen if someone tapped into an unexpected power, like Jenny's magical connection to other people's thoughts.

In 1940, he married fellow teacher and political activist Miriam Brooks, and the couple had four children. Butterworth died of melanoma at his home in West Hartford, Connecticut, at the age of 75.

== Children's books ==
- The Enormous Egg (1956)
- The Trouble with Jenny's Ear (1960)
- The Narrow Passage (1973)
- Orrie's Run (2002)

== See also ==
- Uncle Beazley—Statue named after a dinosaur in the book The Enormous Egg
