= Alan Cheuse =

Novelist, short story writer, critic (1940–2015)

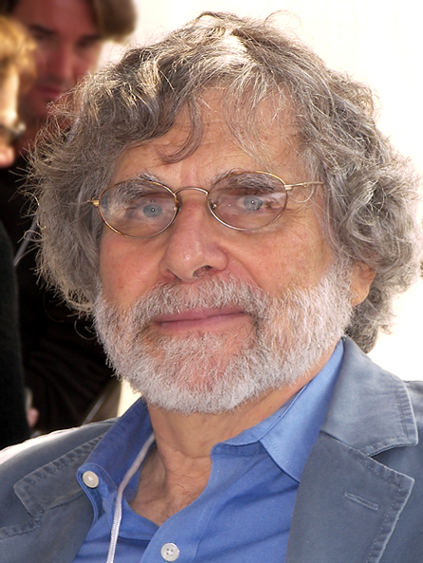
- Alan Cheuse in 2007
- Born: Alan Stuart Cheuse; January 23, 1940; Perth Amboy, New Jersey, U.S.
- Died: July 31, 2015 (aged 75); San Jose, California, U.S.
- Education: Rutgers University (PhD)
- Occupations: Novelist; columnist; short story writer; essayist; professor; radio commentator

Alan Stuart Cheuse (January 23, 1940 – July 31, 2015) was an American writer, editor, professor of literature, and radio commentator. A longtime NPR book commentator, he was also the author of five novels, five collections of short stories and novellas, a memoir and a collection of travel essays. In addition, Cheuse was a regular contributor to the radio program All Things Considered. His short fiction appeared in respected publications like The New Yorker, Ploughshares, The Antioch Review, Prairie Schooner, among other places. He taught in the Writing Program at George Mason University and the Community of Writers.

== Early life ==
Cheuse was born in Perth Amboy, New Jersey. Cheuse grew up in a Jewish family, the son of a Russian immigrant father and a mother of Russian and Romanian descent. Cheuse graduated from Perth Amboy High School in 1957.

== Education ==
Cheuse graduated from Rutgers University in 1961. After traveling abroad and working for several years at writing and editing jobs, Cheuse returned to Rutgers University to study for a Ph.D. in Comparative Literature, which he was awarded in 1974. Cheuse wrote a thesis on the life and work of the Cuban novelist Alejo Carpentier.

Cheuse taught literature at Bennington College for nearly a decade and then took posts at Sewanee: The University of the South, the University of Virginia, and the University of Michigan

== Career ==
Cheuse joined the faculty at George Mason University in the M.F.A. program and taught fiction. For more than 25 years, he taught summers at the Community of Writers at Squaw Valley and also served on its board of directors.

In the late 1970s, Cheuse began publishing short fiction, beginning with a story in The New Yorker, followed with articles for Ploughshares, The Antioch Review, Prairie Schooner, and New Letters. He published his first novel, a biographical historical work about John Reed and Louise Bryant in 1982. Other works of fiction and nonfiction followed.

Cheuse was a regular book reviewer for the NPR radio program All Things Considered. In 1999, Cheuse also helped to found Fall for the Book, a nonprofit literary festival.

== Personal life ==
Cheuse was involved in a serious car crash on July 14, 2015, on California State Route 17 while driving from Olympic Valley to Santa Cruz, California. Cheuse was reported to be in a coma on July 20, 2015, with injuries including fractured ribs, cervical vertebrae, and an acute subdural hematoma. On July 31, 2015, Cheuse died from his auto accident injuries in San Jose, California. He was 75.

=== Legacy ===
Alan Cheuse's papers reside at the Albert and Shirley Small Special Collections Library at the University of Virginia.

== Bibliography ==
=== Books ===
- Candace and Other Stories. Cambridge, Massachusetts: Apple-wood Press, 1980. ISBN 9780918222190 (short story collection)
- The Bohemians: John Reed & His Friends Who Shook the World. Cambridge, Massachusetts: Apple-wood Books, 1982. ISBN 9780918222329 (novel)
- The Grandmothers' Club. Salt Lake City: Peregrine Smith Books, 1986. ISBN 9780918222671 (novel)
- Fall Out of Heaven. Salt Lake City: G. M. Smith, 1987. ISBN 9780879052737 (memoir)
- The Light Possessed. Salt Lake City: Peregrine Smith Books. 1990. ISBN 9780879053635. (novel)
- The Tennessee Waltz and Other Stories. Salt Lake City: Peregrine Smith Books, 1990. ISBN 9780879053666 (short story collection)
- Lost and Old Rivers: Stories. Dallas, Tex.: Southern Methodist University Press, 1998. ISBN 9780870744327 (short story collection)
- Listening to the Page: Adventures in Reading and Writing. New York: Columbia University Press. 2001. ISBN 9780231122702. (essays)
- The Fires. Santa Fe, N.M.: Santa Fe Writers Project. 2007. ISBN 9780977679911. (novellas)
- To Catch the Lightning. Naperville, Ill.: Sourcebooks, Inc. 2008. ISBN 9781402271953. (novel)
- A Trance After Breakfast. Naperville, Ill.: Sourcebooks, Inc. 2009. ISBN 9781402215162. (travel essays, 2009)
- Song of Slaves in the Desert. Naperville, Ill.: Sourcebooks, Inc. 2011. ISBN 9781402242991. (novel)
- Paradise, Or, Eat Your Face. Santa Fe Writers Project, 2012. ISBN 9780981966175 (novellas)
- An Authentic Captain Marvel Ring & Other Stories. Santa Fe Writers Project, 2014. ISBN 9781939650092 (short stories)
- Prayers for the Living. London: Fig Tree Books, 2015.

=== Selected short fiction ===
- "Vishnu, Sleeping on the Cosmic Ocean", The Antioch Review, Summer 2013
- "Pip: A Story In Three Parts", Michigan Quarterly Review, Volume 51, Issue 1, Winter 2012. Based on the character Pip in Herman Melville's Moby Dick
- "When the Stars Threw Down Their Spears and Watered Heaven with Their Tears" (novella), The Idaho Review, 2011
- "A Merry Little", ACM, #48, Winter, 2009
- "An Authentic Captain Marvel Ring", Superstition Review, Fall 2008
- "A Little Death", The Southern Review, Summer 2007
- "Thirty-Five Passages Over Water", The Antioch Review, Fall 2006
- "Moonrise, Hernandez, New Mexico, 1941", New Letters, Fall 2006
- "In the Kauri Forest", Ploughshares, Fall 2006
- "Gribnis", Prairie Schooner, Winter 2006
- "Horse Sacrifice and the Shaman’s Ascent to the Sky", The Land-Grant College Review, Winter 2005
- "Paradise, Or, Eat Your Face" (novella), The Idaho Review, Winter 2004
- "Revels", Southern California Anthology, Summer 2004
- "Days Given Over to Travel", Prairie Schooner, Summer 2003

=== Edited works ===
- With Lisa Alvarez et al. Writing Workshop in a Book: The Squaw Valley Community of Writers on the Art of Fiction. San Francisco: Chronicle Books, 2007.
- Seeing Ourselves: Great Early American Short Stories. 2007.
- With Nicholas Delbanco. Literature: Craft & Voice, Vols. 1–3. 2nd edn. McGraw-Hill, 2012.
