= Miriam Butterworth =

American educator, activist, and politician (1918–2019)

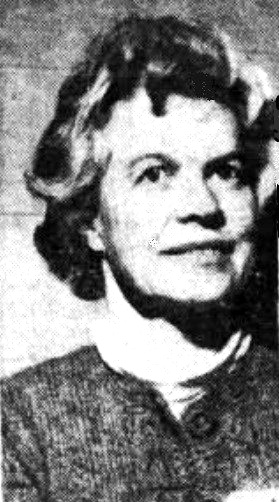
- Butterworth in 1971
- Born: Miriam Ford Brooks; April 14, 1918; Hartford, Connecticut, U.S.
- Died: July 9, 2019 (aged 101); Bloomfield, Connecticut, U.S.
- Other names: Mims Butterworth, Miriam Brooks Butterworth
- Education: Connecticut College (BA); Wesleyan University (MA)
- Occupations: educator, politician, historian, activist
- Years active: 1940–2018
- Political party: Democratic
- Spouse: Oliver Butterworth
- Children: 4; including Tim

Miriam Butterworth (April 14, 1918 – July 9, 2019) was an American educator, activist, and politician.

Butterworth fought for redistricting to equalize representation in the Connecticut General Assembly. She was involved in the international peace movement, traveling internationally to work for peace to end the Vietnam War and later as a monitor for voting in Nicaragua. After teaching at independent schools, Butterworth served as chair of the Public Utilities Control Authority. She served as president of Hartford College for Women, on the Town Council of West Hartford, and later as town historian.

== Early life ==
Miriam Ford "Mims" Brooks was born on April 14, 1918, in Hartford, Connecticut, to Genevieve (née Ford) and John Lee Brooks. Her father was employed in a grocery and also worked for the government on road maintenance. He served as a Methodist preacher and her mother, who played the church organ, worked as a cook. Raised during the Great Depression, the family had limited resources. Brooks grew up in Windsor, Connecticut, and was able to attend the Chaffee School only because tuition was free to residents. While attending Chaffee, she met Oliver Butterworth, a friend of some of her classmates.

After graduating, Brooks went on to study as a scholarship student at Connecticut College and became active in student protesting. In 1938 she traveled to Germany on a summer student trip. The visit, on the eve of World War II sparked her interest in world politics. Returning to Connecticut, she graduated with a bachelor's degree in history with a minor in German. In June 1940, soon after her graduation, Brooks and Oliver married and moved to Kent. She continued her education, earning a master's degree from Wesleyan College.

== Career ==
Butterworth began her career teaching at Ethel Walker School and then later taught history at her alma mater, Loomis Chaffee. While the couple lived in Kent, three of their four children were born, before they moved to Sunset Farm in West Hartford, which Oliver and his father operated. After the move, Butterworth became active with the League of Women Voters and she became aware of an imbalance in the apportionment of representation in the Connecticut General Assembly. Terms of the 1818 Constitution of Connecticut established that each town would have 2 representatives, which did not take into consideration shifts in population. When a Tennessee case Baker v. Carr (1962) made it to the Supreme Court and determined that redistricting was within federal jurisdiction, Butterworth and Oliver joined a class action lawsuit along with eight other people to redistrict Connecticut. The initiative was sponsored and funded by the League of Women Voters and Butterworth was the "only female plaintiff in the case". Heard by a 3-judge panel in the United States District Court for the District of Connecticut at New Haven, Butterworth et al. won their case in a 2–1 decision. Though the state appealed the decision to the Supreme Court, the District Court decision was upheld and voting districts were reapportioned based on population size.

Having been involved with the Democratic Party since she was first able to vote, for Franklin D. Roosevelt, in 1968 Butterworth became chair of the presidential campaign for Eugene McCarthy for Connecticut and served that year as a delegate to the Democratic National Convention. Opposed to the Vietnam War, she attended peace rallies and in 1971, Butterworth, as a member of the American Friends Service Committee, traveled with 169 delegates to Paris to discuss terms to attain peace to end the war. A committed pacifist, she wanted an immediate end to the war, but after the conference felt that if the United States Government did not initiate a peace plan, with a scheduled withdrawal, the conflict would be prolonged. For decades Butterworth protested every Saturday, in West Hartford Center, against war, including those in Nicaragua, Iran and Iraq, as well as in opposition to nuclear arms. She also served on the national board of the Committee for a Sane Nuclear Policy, known simply as SANE.

In 1975, Governor Ella Grasso appointed Butterworth to serve on the state's Public Utilities Control Authority and made her chair in 1978, the first woman to hold the leadership position. Though she led the government body, in May 1979, Butterworth was fired by Grasso and then accepted the post as president of the Hartford College for Women. The post was temporary, as the previous president had resigned and was slated to be replaced in September 1980. In 1981, she ran for a seat on the West Hartford Town Council and won with 11,222 votes, more than any other Democratic candidate. Butterworth traveled to Nicaragua in 1984 as an international observer to the first democratic election held in the country in ten years. She was critical of the United States' policies in Central America fearing that tensions might escalate into a "second Vietnam". In the election of 1985, Butterworth decided not to run for reelection to the town council.

By the 1990s, Butterworth was working as the town historian and served on the committee planning events for the sesquicentennial of West Hartford. In 1995, she attended the World Conference on Women, hosted in Beijing. To give a more balanced history of West Hartford, she wrote a book in 1997, researched by Sally Whipple, to relate the history of African American contributions to the community. Her book, as well as an earlier town history by Ellsworth Grant, were eventually published in 2001 as Celebrate! West Hartford: An illustrated history, when Richard "Dick" Woodworth joined them to help get the stalled project to press. In 2008, she wrote her memoirs, never intending them for publication, but in 2010 Just Say Yes was published. In 2018, Lull Before the Storm taken from her diary kept during her 1938 trip to Heidelberg became Butterworth's fourth book.

== Death and legacy ==
Butterworth died from heart disease on July 9, 2019, in Bloomfield, Connecticut, where she had been in hospice care. Her papers were donated to the Thomas J. Dodd Research Center at the University of Connecticut Libraries. A gallery at the Hartford College for Women was named Miriam B. Butterworth Art Gallery in her honor.
