= Hazel Thrall Sullivan =

American politician (1915–2000)

- Sullivan c. 1946

Member of the Connecticut House of Representatives from Windsor
- In office 1945–1949 Serving with Carlan H. Goslee
- Preceded by: J. Ford Ransom; William E. Hastings
- Succeeded by: John F. Stack; Philip P. Laing

Personal details
- Born: October 5, 1915 Windsor, Connecticut, U.S.
- Died: April 10, 2000 (aged 84) Hartford, Connecticut, U.S.
- Party: Democratic
- Spouse: Frank J. Sullivan
- Children: 3
- Education: Smith College; University of Hartford (MEd)

Hazel Thrall Sullivan (October 5, 1915 – April 10, 2000) was an American politician who served in the Connecticut House of Representatives from 1945 to 1949, representing the town of Windsor as a Democrat.

== Personal life and education ==
Sullivan was born on October 5, 1915, in Windsor, Connecticut, to Oliver J. and Mamie Thrall. She graduated from the Loomis Chaffee School, a college-preparatory school in Windsor. She later graduated from Smith College in Northampton, Massachusetts, and attended the Katherine Gibbs Secretarial School in Boston. She married Frank J. Sullivan in 1937 and had three children.

Following her retirement from politics, Sullivan attended the University of Hartford in West Hartford, Connecticut. She graduated in 1962 with a master's degree in education. She performed postgraduate research at the Institute of American History at Smith College in 1966, the Institute in Underdeveloped Nations at Claremont College in 1968, and the Institute in Economics at the University of New Mexico in 1969. Sullivan then returned to Connecticut, where she taught at Windsor High School for twenty years.

== Political career ==
Sullivan was first elected to the Connecticut House of Representatives in 1944, and she served two terms representing the town of Windsor as a Democrat. She served both terms alongside Republican Carlan H. Goslee. Sullivan was a member of the Education Committee. She did not run for reelection in 1948.

== Death ==
Sullivan died on April 10, 2000, at Hartford Hospital in Hartford, Connecticut. She was 84.
