= Leslie Morgan Steiner =

American author and domestic violence advocate

- Born: July 20, 1965 (age 60); Washington, D.C., U.S.
- Occupation: Author, domestic violence advocate
- Years active: 2009–present
- Known for: Domestic violence advocacy, Ted Talks

Leslie Morgan Steiner (born July 20, 1965) is an American author and advocate for victims of domestic violence.

== Life and career ==
Leslie Anne Morgan was born in Washington, D.C. and is a 1987 graduate of Harvard College and 1992 earned an MBA from the Wharton School of Business. Steiner's first published work was an autobiographical account of her teenage struggle with anorexia nervosa, published in Seventeen in September 1986. The article, "Starving for Perfection", was written under the pseudonym Isabel Johnson and received over 4000 reader letters, at the time a record for Seventeen, and appeared in the 1993 anthology The College Reader.

Steiner went on to work in the Articles Department for Seventeen from 1987-1988. She was a freelance magazine writer and consultant from 1988-1990. She earned an MBA degree in Marketing from the Wharton School of Business at the University of Pennsylvania in 1992.

Her corporate marketing career included stints at the Leo Burnett advertising agency in Chicago and Johnson & Johnson in New Brunswick, New Jersey. At Johnson & Johnson she launched the low-calorie sweetener ingredient sucralose, also known as Splenda Brand Sweetener, internationally from 1994-2000. She oversaw the public relations program for the sweetener's United States Food and Drug Administration approval on April 1, 1999.

In early 2001 Steiner returned to her hometown of Washington, D.C., to become general manager of The Washington Post Magazine. While working for The Washington Post, Steiner became interested in the struggles of and tensions between American working and stay-at-home mothers. Her anthology Mommy Wars: Stay-at-Home and Career Moms Face off on their Choices, Their Lives, Their Families was published in 2006 by Random House and the essays by a range of at-home and working mothers such as Jane Smiley, Susan Cheever, Carolyn Hax and Jane Juska generated extensive media interest and controversy among conflicted American mothers, including mommy bloggers, daddy bloggers and publications such as The Atlantic Monthly, the Los Angeles Times and elsewhere. After the book's publication, Steiner continued to interpret the mommy wars, including the controversy created by the nomination of Alaska governor Sarah Palin as the Republican Party's vice presidential candidate and Michelle Obama's position as the first African-American first lady.

From 2006 to 2008, Steiner wrote On Balance, an online column exploring work/family conflicts for washingtonpost.com, the Internet site for her employer. On Balance, one of the site's first forays into the blogosphere, quickly became popular among a diverse audience of men and women with and without children. Over the course of two years, Steiner's column became one of the most popular "mommy blogs" on the web. Steiner wrote over 500 columns, and the site accumulated over 100,000 comments from online posters. The readership weighed in with up to 700 comments per day. Over the course of 27 months, 112,898 total comments were submitted by 11,735 different posting names and 16,632 anonymous posters.

Steiner's 2009 memoir Crazy Love, about surviving domestic violence spent three weeks on The New York Times Best Seller list. Steiner is the author of a popular TED Talk which tries to explain why victims stay with abusive partners.

Her third book, The Baby Chase: How Surrogacy Is Transforming the American Family, was published by St. Martin's Press in 2013, and is the subject of a 2014 TEDTalk about the ethics of global surrogacy.

Her most recent memoir is The Naked Truth, published by Simon & Schuster in 2019. It is the story of rediscoverying herself as an older woman in the wake of her second divorce. In May 2022, she wrote an op-ed on her plans to wear a bikini on the beach at age 56.

Steiner has three children and lives in the District of Columbia, East Hampton, and New Hampshire.
