= Lyman Maynard Stowe =

American physician and academic administrator

- Stowe circa 1965
- Born: March 14, 1914; Hartford, Connecticut, U.S.
- Died: June 2, 1965 (aged 51); Hartford, Connecticut, U.S.
- Occupations: Physician, academic administrator
- Title: Dean of the UConn School of Medicine

Academic background
- Education: Yale University (BA, MD)

Academic work
- Discipline: Obstetrics and gynecology
- Institutions: University of Connecticut; Stanford University

Lyman Maynard Stowe (March 14, 1914 – June 2, 1965) was an American physician and academic administrator. He served as the first dean of the University of Connecticut School of Medicine. The Lyman Maynard Stowe Library at the UConn Health Center was named in his honor.

== Early life and education ==
Stowe was born in Hartford, Connecticut, on March 14, 1914. Graduating from Loomis Chaffee School in 1930, he earned a Bachelor of Arts degree from Yale University in 1934 and an M.D. from Yale School of Medicine in 1938. He specialized in obstetrics and gynecology. He spent two years as a rotating intern and resident at the Jersey City Medical Center before returning to New Haven for a year-long residency in pathology in 1940.

== Career ==
Upon completing his residencies in Jersey City and New Haven, Stowe next served as a teaching fellow in obstetrics and gynecology at the University of Minnesota Hospital from 1941 to 1944, when he enlisted in the United States Navy during World War II. He served for two years and received an honorable discharge at the rank of lieutenant in 1946. He served on board the USS Effingham when the ship engaged in the Battle of Okinawa.

On leaving the Navy, Stowe spent a final year at Minnesota before rejoining his alma mater, Yale School of Medicine, as an instructor in obstetrics and gynecology from 1947 to 1949. In 1949, Stowe became an assistant professor at the Stanford University School of Medicine, where he was promoted to associate professor in 1955. He became Associate Dean for Academic Affairs at the Stanford Medical School, where he oversaw research and the curriculum and participated in a major study of medical education for the California Coordinating Committee on Higher Education. He published in academic journals such as Obstetrics & Gynecology, American Journal of Obstetrics and Gynecology, and Journal of Medical Education.

Stowe became the first dean of UConn's new medical school in Farmington in May 1963, only two years after the Connecticut General Assembly authorized the establishment of a state medical center. Stowe recruited William Fleeson, assistant dean at the University of Minnesota, and John Patterson, dean at the University of British Columbia, as the UConn medical school's first faculty to help him build the program.

Stowe espoused progressive ideas on medical education. He streamlined laboratories so that students could conduct all their lab work in the same spaces, promoted a focus on holistic medicine, and advocated for new doctors to move more quickly through their residencies and for promising students to advance to medical training at a younger age. He also published an academic journal article on Stanford's progressive approach.

Stowe was a member of the American Association for the Advancement of Science and the American Society for Clinical Research. He consulted for the medical schools at the universities of Arizona, British Columbia, Brown, Buffalo, Duke, Wisconsin, Kansas, Louisville, and Missouri.

== Death and legacy ==
Stowe suffered a heart attack at his Farmington home in the early hours of June 2, 1965. He died soon afterward at Hartford Hospital. He was 51 years old. He was survived by his wife of 27 years, Lois Schneider Stowe, and their three sons: Maynard, David, and John. John Patterson succeeded him as UConn medical school dean. The Lyman Maynard Stowe Library at the UConn Health Center was named in his honor. UConn Health also issues the Lyman Stowe Award for Patient Care and the Lyman Stowe Award for humanitarianism in medicine.
