= Richard Currey =

American author

- Born: 1949 (age 76–77); Parkersburg, West Virginia
- Education: West Virginia University; Howard University
- Years active: 1974-1997

Richard Currey (born 1949) is an American author born in West Virginia. He is known for his writing of the Vietnam era and of West Virginia. He is the recipient of two NEA fellowships.

== Early life and education ==
Born in Parkersburg, West Virginia, Currey went on to serve as a Navy medical corpsman between 1968 and 1972. He enrolled at West Virginia University after his time in the service, and stayed there until 1974. He attended Howard University, an HBCU, from 1974 until 1979.

== Career ==
In his writings, Currey often reflects on his own experiences of military service, family, and living in West Virginia. He has been nominated for the Pulitzer Prize, is an O. Henry Award winner, a PEN/Hemingway Award finalist, and has served as the DH Lawrence Fellow in Literature and writer in residence at The University of New Mexico. He is a speaker on the topic of the intersection of art and the military.

== Bibliography ==
- Crossing Over: A Vietnam Journal (1980) Applewood Books, reprinted by Santa Fe Writers Project, 2018
- Fatal Light (1988) E. P. Dutton, reprinted by Santa Fe Writers Project, 2009
- The Wars of Heaven (1990) Houghton Mifflin Harcourt, reprinted by Santa Fe Writers Project, 2014
- Medicine For Sale: Commercialism vs. Professionalism (1992) Whittle Communications
- Lost Highway (1997) Houghton Mifflin Harcourt
