= The Life Swap =

The Life Swap memorializes the adventures of writer Nancy Weber after she put an ad in The Village Voice offering to trade places — friends, families, lovers, work, and breakfast preferences — with a stranger. Originally published by Dial Press in 1974, The Life Swap came back into print in 2006 through self-publishing and print on demand press iUniverse.
