= Santa Fe Writers Project =

American English-language publisher

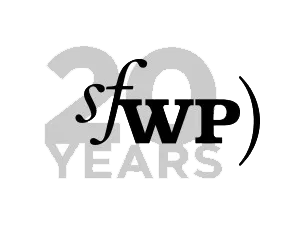
- Status: Active
- Founded: January 2, 1998; 28 years ago
- Founders: Andrew Gifford
- Country of origin: United States
- Headquarters location: Santa Fe, New Mexico
- Distribution: Worldwide by Independent Publishers Group
- Publication types: Books
- Official website: www.sfwp.com

The Santa Fe Writers Project (SFWP) is an American independent press. Founded in 1998 by Andrew Gifford, it began as a small effort supported by writers and arts advocates. Today, Gifford continues to direct the press. SFWP hosts a literary awards program and an online journal.

In addition to publishing literary fiction, and creative non-fiction, the press also reprints out-of-print books of literary merit or social value.

While the press is largely operated from Bethesda, Maryland it was founded in Santa Fe, New Mexico. The earliest titles were funded personally by Gifford's savings, often resulting in a loss.

With over 60 titles in print, the press publishes around four to six titles a year.

== Notable books ==
| Year | Title | Author | Genre | ISBN |
|---|---|---|---|---|
| 2007 | The Fires | Alan Cheuse | Novellas | ISBN 978-0-9776799-1-1 |
| 2010 | The Wars of Heaven | Richard Currey | Fiction / Reprint | ISBN 978-1-939650-05-4 |
| 2013 | Black Livingstone | Pagan Kennedy | Biography / Reprint | ISBN 978-0-9882252-6-8 |
| 2014 | Fatal Light | Richard Currey | Fiction / Reprint | ISBN 978-0-9776799-2-8 |
| 2015 | Pagan Kennedy's Living | Pagan Kennedy | Nonfiction / Reprint | ISBN 978-1-939650-50-4 |
| 2018 | All Roads Lead to Blood | Bonnie Chau | Short stories | ISBN 978-1-939650-87-0 |
| 2021 | Negative Space | Lilly Dancyger | Memoir | ISBN 978-1-951631-03-1 |
| 2021 | What If We Were Somewhere Else | Wendy J. Fox | Short stories | ISBN 978-1-951631-05-5 |
| 2024 | The Book of Losman | K.E. Semmel | Novel | ISBN 978-1951631376 |
