= Nancy Weber =

American writer (born 1942)

Nancy Weber (born 1942 in Hartford, Connecticut) is an American writer.

== Works ==
Weber is known primarily for her non-fiction work The Life Swap (1974; re-issued 2006). Her twenty-some other books include The Playgroup (1982) and Brokenhearted (1989), both speculative novels with medical themes, and eight romances written under the name Jennifer Rose.

Weber's works in progress include Seagull: The Musical, with composer Alexander Zhurbin, and Party Math, the how much and how many of entertaining, with artist Richard Pitts.
