= Diagnosis (disambiguation) =

Diagnosis is the identification of the nature and cause of a certain phenomenon.

Medical diagnosis is the process of identifying a disease or medical condition.

Diagnosis may also refer to:

- Diagnosis (Polish TV series), a 2017 thriller medical drama
- Diagnosis (American TV series), a 2019 documentary web television series
- Diagnosis: Murder
- Diagnosis (artificial intelligence), concerned with the development of algorithms and techniques that are able to determine whether the behaviour of a system is correct
