= Kevin Klauber =

American film editor

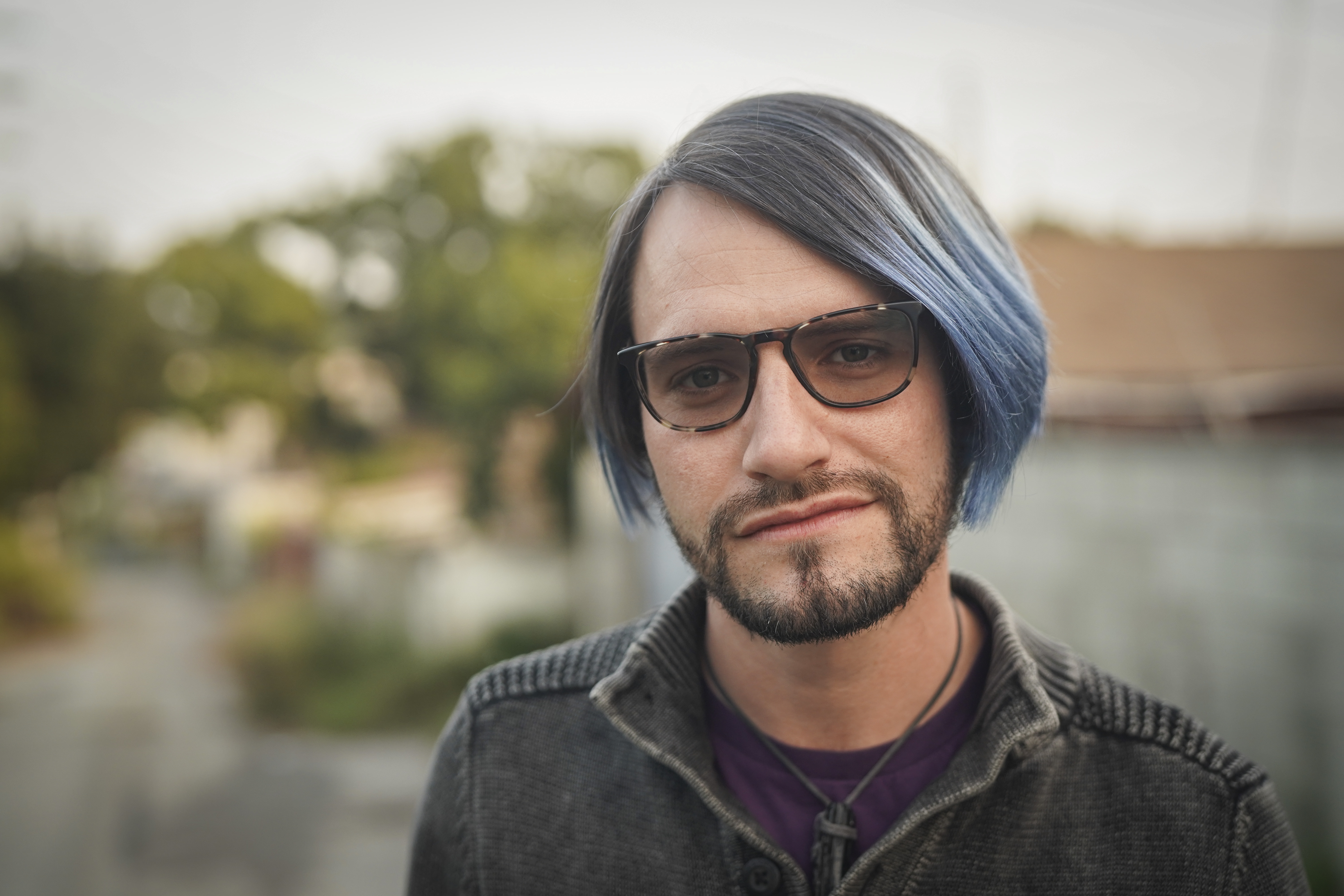
- Born: U.S.
- Occupation(s): Editor, writer, producer, director
- Years active: 2006-present

Kevin Klauber, ACE, is an American documentary film editor and writer. He is best known for his work on Pearl Jam Twenty, 20 Feet from Stardom, Chicken People, Diagnosis and Rita Moreno: Just a Girl Who Decided to Go for It.

== Career ==
Kevin graduated from University of Southern California (USC) with a degree in film production. His editorial debut documentary feature, Pearl Jam Twenty.

== Filmography ==
Year	Title	Contribution	Note
2006	Memorium	Director, writer and editor	Short film
2006	Bio.Rhythm	Director, writer and producer	Short film
2009	Stray	Director, writer and editor	Short film
2010	The Horrible Terrible Misadventures of David Atkins	Editor	TV series
2011	Pearl Jam Twenty	Editor	Documentary
2012	Beauty Is Embarrassing	Writer	Documentary
2012	$24 in 24	Editor	TV series
2013	20 Feet from Stardom	Editor	Documentary
2013	Enough Is Enough	Editor	Short film
2013-2014	Brew Dogs	Editor	TV series
2014	Harmontown	Editor	Documentary
2014	Under the Electric Sky	Supervising editor	Documentary
2015	The Runner-Up	Editor	Documentary series
2015	Romeo Is Bleeding	Editor	Documentary
2015	The Agent	Editor	Documentary series
2015	Pray for Ukraine	Editor	Documentary
2016	Chicken People	Editor	Documentary
2016-2017	RocketJump Film School	Writer	Documentary series
2017	Dancing Towards the Light	Editor	Documentary
2017	Icarus	Editor	Documentary
2018	Ugly Delicious	Editor	Documentary series
2018	Phenoms	Editor	Documentary Series
2018	Echo in the Canyon	Editor	Documentary
2019	This Giant Beast That is the Global Economy	Editor	Documentary series
2019	Fantastic Fungi	Editor	Documentary
2019	Bystander	Editor	Short film
2019	Moving Art	Editor	Documentary series
2020	Happy Happy Joy Joy: The Ren & Stimpy Story	Editor and producer	Documentary
2021	The Most Fearless	Writer	Documentary
2021	Rita Moreno: Just a Girl Who Decided to Go for It	Editor	Documentary
2021	Brian Wilson: Long Promised Road	Editor and writer	Documentary
2024	The Blue Angels	Editor	Documentary

== Awards and nominations ==
Year	Result	Award	Category	Work	Ref.
2012	Nominated	Motion picture Sound Editors	Best Sound Editing - Sound Effects, Foley, Dialogue, ADR and Music in a Feature Documentary	Pearl Jam Twenty	
2014	Won	American Cinema Editors	Best Edited Documentary – Feature	20 Feet from Stardom	
