= Diagnosis (American TV series) =

2019 docuseries on Netflix

- Genre: Docuseries
- Music by: Amy Beauchamp; Jose Cancela; Matt Gibbs
- Country of origin: United States
- Original language: English
- No. of seasons: 1
- No. of episodes: 7

Production
- Executive producers: Scott Rudin; Eli Bush; Garrett Basch; Alex Braverman; P. G. Morgan; Jonathan Chinn; Simon Chinn
- Cinematography: Jeremy Leach
- Editors: Andy Seklir; Todd Downing; Matthew Moul; Kevin Klauber
- Running time: 43–49 minutes

Original release
- Network: Netflix
- Release: August 16, 2019

Diagnosis is a 2019 documentary television series. The series follows Dr. Lisa Sanders as she attempts to help patients with rare illnesses and searches for a diagnosis and cure using wisdom of the crowd methods. The show is based on her column for The New York Times Magazine. It was released on August 16, 2019, on Netflix.

== Author ==
Lisa Sanders was born on July 24, 1956, in South Carolina. Sanders grew up loving the idea of mystery and became fond of Arthur Conan Doyle's fictional character, detective Sherlock Holmes. Sanders went to the College of William & Mary where she majored in English.

After her graduation in 1979, she was hired by ABC News as a journalist. During her 10-year career as a journalist, Sanders won an Emmy award for her reporting of Hurricane Hugo. She was repeatedly drawn to stories that focused around mysteries and medicine. After about 10 years of reporting, Sanders decided to pursue a career within the medical field.

She was accepted into the post-baccalaureate pre-medical program at Columbia University. After completing her pre-medical requirements, she was accepted into Yale Medical School. She completed her residency at Yale and became her class’s chief resident.

Sanders became an attending internal medicine physician for the Yale-New Haven Hospital. As her new career progressed, she joined Yale’s Department of Internal Medicine while also teaching primary care at the school of medicine.

In 2002, a friend of hers working at The New York Times sparked a conversation about what doctors could provide in a literature perspective. After more discussion, Sanders started writing a column for The New York Times called Diagnosis. The column would highlight medical mysteries that she would encounter with her own patients and those of her colleagues. She described the cases as mysteries, revealing the diagnosis in the following week's column.

The column was adapted for the 2004 TV series House M.D., for which Sanders served as a medical consultant for the show.

Her work also has resulted in a documentary series. A Netflix documentary series titled Diagnosis was released in August 2019. Produced by the New York Times, each episode follows Dr. Lisa Sanders as she seeks to diagnose patients with difficult symptoms.

In addition to writing a column for The New York Times, Sanders has written 4 books related to medicine.

== Cast ==
- Lisa Sanders — physician, narrator, and columnist for The New York Times.
- Angel Parker — a 23-year-old nursing student from Las Vegas, Nevada. Her symptoms include episodes of severe muscle pain that render her immobile.
- Sadie Gonzalez — a 7-year-old girl from Queens, New York. She suffers from hundreds of seizures daily. Physicians initially suggest removing a large part of her brain (a hemispherectomy) as a form of treatment.
- Willie Reyes — a 46-year-old Army veteran from Vado, New Mexico. He suffers from frequent seizures that result in memory loss and mood swings.
- Kamiyah Morgan — a 6-year-old girl from Vermillion, South Dakota. She has frequent fainting episodes that can happen up to 300 times a day; these cause her to temporarily go limp and unresponsive.
- Lashay Hamblin — a 16-year-old high school student from South Jordan, Utah. She cannot keep down any foods or liquids but does not have bulimia.
- Matt Lee — a 20-year-old college student from Mt. Airy, Maryland. He suffers from frequent fainting spells that occur when he feels a sense of deja vu. These fainting spells also cause his heart to momentarily stop.
- Joe — a 61-year-old man from Wallingford, Connecticut. He was struck with a sudden and unexplained paralysis from his waist down, leaving him paraplegic.
- Ann — a 42-year-old patient from Wallingford, CT. She has intermittent paralysis affecting the right side of her body. She will regain mobility but the paralysis always occurs again.

== Episodes ==
No.	Title	Original release date
1	"Detective Work"	August 16, 2019
2	"Second Opinions"	August 16, 2019
3	"The Wisdom of the Crowd"	August 16, 2019
4	"Looking for a Village"	August 16, 2019
5	"A Question of Trust"	August 16, 2019
6	"Déjà Vu"	August 16, 2019
7	"Paralyzed"	August 16, 2019

== Episode 1: Detective Work ==
Angel Parker is a 23-year-old nursing student. Her earliest memory of her illness dates to when she was 14, and woke in the middle of the night not able to move. Since then her illness has progressed into daily severe muscle pain episodes, where the pain will start at the bottom of her legs and grow its way up to jaw. These episodes render Angel immobile for hours, her pee is pitch black, and very frequently she has to be admitted to the hospital. Angel says that any increase in physical strain or exercise makes her symptoms worse but she still pursues athletic activities. Each time she is admitted, physicians have been unable to find a cause for her pain. She has been tested for Rheumatoid Arthritis, Lupus, Multiple Sclerosis, and Autoimmune diseases - all have had negative results. After a colleague sent Angel’s story to Dr. Lisa Sanders, she decided to take on the case and seek a solution. Dr. Sanders published Angel’s story in her column, Diagnosis, asking readers to help find a diagnosis for her symptoms. One big medical anomaly that physicians have recorded during Angel’s episodes is a rise in her Creatine Kinase levels. Creatine Kinase is muscle protein; Angel's highest CK level recorded during an episode was 57 thousand U/L in comparison to average levels of 22-198 U/L.

After Dr. Sanders published Angel’s story, she received thousands of responses on possible diagnosis based on the symptoms. The most common response was the possibility of a Metabolic Myopathy that translates to a metabolic muscle illness and are usually caused by the muscle's inability to breakdown nutrients. The muscles begin to break themselves down to yield energy. As Angel gets closer to possibly having a diagnosis, she starts to think about a possible future with children. She worries that if her disease is genetic, she wouldn't want to put her children at risk.

A medical student from Italy reaches out to Dr. Sanders. She describes her 4th- year thesis on metabolic gene testing that could be beneficial in narrowing down a diagnosis. Angel travels to Turin, Italy for blood and urine testing. The testing showed that Angel had a normal metabolic gene profile, which eliminated many possible metabolic disorders. The physicians in Italy submitted her genomes into a sequencing trial that could take up to two months to process but could hopefully result with a diagnosis. After the two months, Angel receives a call from the Physician with a complete result and a solid diagnosis of Carnitine Palmitoyltransferase II Deficiency.

== Episode 2: Second Opinions ==
Sadie Gonzalez is a 7 year old little girl from Queens, NY, with a severe brain disorder. Sadie suffers from very frequent seizures that have resulted in a slight speech and mobility impediment. Her mother recounts the first time Sadie had a seizure being the morning of the 29th of December, when Sadie was 6 years old. The seizures stopped for two months and in late February Sadies seizures started to violently progress into daily visible seizures that will affect different parts of her body at a time. At the time of recording the episode, Sadie was having a motor seizure almost every couple of minutes. Sadie was admitted into the Columbia Presbyterian where multiple MRI’s were done showing no signs of brain damage or brain tumors. These results along with her symptoms led some physicians to believe she had Rasmussen’s. Rasmussen’s Encephalitis, explained by Dr. Lisa Sanders, is characterized by the chronic inflammation caused by T-Lymph white blood cells to invade half of the brain and destroy it. The only sure treatment for Rasmussen’s is a hemispherectomy, where the corpus callosum is severed and separated the diseased side of the brain from the healthy side. This procedure can result in loss of vision in one eye, losing the ability to move one half of her body, or losing the ability to speak. If Sadie actually does have this disorder and undergoes the procedure, then half of the brain can spread into the second half, causing the brain to deteriorate.

The parents of Sadie reach out to Dr. Lisa Sanders in hopes of getting a second opinion, a different diagnosis, or a different treatment. Essentially looking for any route that could lead to a better life for Sadie that doesn't have to hinder her more than her disease hinders her now. Dr. Lisa Sanders put their story out onto her column and awaited for the responses. Many of the responses from the audience agreed with the diagnosis of Rasmussen’s, others suggested that the seizures could be controlled with electro stimulation therapy, and a third group suggested it was a neurologic version of Lyme Disease. She was tested for various diseases under different conditions and one specific test came back strongly positive, resulting in a diagnosis that led to a manageable treatment, and also a responsive neurostimulation device was implanted by a neurosurgeon.

== Episode 3: The Wisdom of the Crowd ==
Willie Reyes is a 46 year old Army Veteran who is slowly losing his memories as a result of frequent seizures. Willie’s wife recounts the first time he had a seizure when he was 44 and he just fell to the floor one day without any explanation. Since the first seizure, he has developed multiple brain lesions, progressive memory loss, hearing loss, and violent/emotional mood swings. Willie says that because of his memory loss he forgets a lot of things and constantly repeats himself, making him feel like a child. His biggest fear is waking up one day and completely forgetting about his family. His daughter reveals that, recently, he's been starting to forget major memories from her childhood, such as her birth. Dr. Lisa Sanders took a look at Willie’s MRI scans and noted a huge lesion at the base of his brain with finger-like deterioration rooting up from it. She has a theory that the deterioration reaching the memory region of his brain could be the reason for his memory loss and mood swings. His wife states that in June 2019, he had a biopsy done with a piece of brain matter and the results came back as having unspecified inflammation. Dr. Sanders says that one of the biggest reasons that his condition is hard to diagnose is because it has very similar symptoms to a lot of common brain disorders, with no response to steroids.

Dr. Lisa Sanders took out to publish Willie’s story and awaited the response with a possible diagnosis. Dr. Sanders expresses her disappointment in the fact that even if they are able to find a diagnosis or treatment for his illness, he may not be able to recover all the memories he has already lost. From the hundreds of responses Dr. Sanders highlighted 2 very interesting possibilities one caused by a virus and the other caused by an autoimmune disorder. The first possibility is Progressive Multifocal Leukoencephalopathy that is caused by a virus and destroys the brain's ability to translate information. The second possibility is a very rare autoimmune disease by the name of Neuro-Behcet’s that causes inflammation and ulceration in different types of the body. Neither of these diagnoses seemed to fit Willie exactly because of key features such as Willie’s very strong immune system and the fact that he had no response to steroids. Due to Willie’s background in the Army, the suggestion of the Gulf War Illness was brought up. When Dr. Sanders brought this idea to another physician for a second diagnosis, they highlighted key similarities between Willie's condition and the Gulf War Illness despite his being much more severe. The idea of the Gulf War Illness was tossed around as a possibility and brought up to many physicians for second opinions, each one highlighting his symptoms are much more severe, and suggesting the possibility of testing for further clarity. To better understand the chances of Willie having the Gulf War Illness, they need to know if he was exposed to the toxins present during the Gulf War. However, the military provided him with no records of any medical discrepancies caused by actions during war. If Willie was to be diagnosed with Gulf War Illness, he would not have a course of treatment. He would have to learn to cope with the disease until a treatment becomes available in the future. Willie and his wife go to visit a Marine Veteran who was diagnosed with Gulf War Illness to be able to relate any similarities and narrow down the possibilities.

== Episode 4: Looking for a Village ==
Kamiyah Morgan is a 6 year old little girl who suffers from a very unusual set of fainting episodes that will leave her unresponsive and immobile, and they can happen up to 300 times a day. When she experiences a fainting episode she will become completely paralyzed affecting everything in her body including her lungs, her mother states that every day that passes her ability to breathe diminishes. Kamiyah’s mother said that these fainting episodes started when she was about 8 months old as she would be crawling and suddenly tip over and go limp. At first their pediatric physician said the episodes looked like she was having a seizure, but after running an EEG there was no seizure being detected during the episodes. They then tried testing with MRI for any brain tumors or malignancies but again there was nothing. They were then referred over to the NIH or the National Institute of Health where their entire purpose is to be able to research and hopefully diagnose very strange cases. They NIH tested every system and every symptom and they were unable to find anything, they submitted her blood in for testing and they have yet to hear of anything from them for over two years. When Dr. Lisa Sanders asked the NIH for Kamiyah records; they were reluctant to release them even though she had her mother's permission, very shortly after this interaction Breteni, Kamiyah’s mother, received an email from NIH to discuss Kamiyah’s results. Breteni was upset over this interaction because it took them two years to be able to come out with her daughter’s results and only after an interaction with Dr. Lisa Sanders. Dr. Sanders believed this was because they might have initially forgotten to share the results and didn't want to ligate any misinterpretations. Once Breteni received the results it was shown that Kamiyah had a break in a gene that wasn't inherited from her mother or father, it created itself. Specifically a break within the KCNMA1 gene, and she was the first patient of her kind, she's “groundbreaking”. The NIH said that it would take more patients with the same illness and a doctor to “peg” it to be able to create a disease grouping for diagnosis.

When Dr. Lisa Sanders created the column for Kamiyah, instead of asking for the readers to chime in for their diagnosis, she went out looking for readers who would have the same symptoms/gene break as her. From the publication of the column, Breteni was able to find dozens of people who themselves or their children had the same KCNMA1 gene mutation. There was also a scientist who reached out to Dr. Lisa Sanders, who had based the last 20 years of her career on researching the specific ion pathway for the KCNMA1 gene. The scientist goes into detail about the gene and how it regulates the amount of potassium that enters the cells and as a result this affects the brain wave levels corresponding to movement and in theory would create the fainting episodes. Kamiyah as well as all the patients found through the column became the breakthrough needed to begin proper human research towards a diagnosis and treatment of the gene mutation. While Kamiyah was not able to technically receive a diagnosis for her illness, she created the pathway for research into possible treatments for patients in the future.

== Episode 5: A Question of Trust ==
Lashay Hamblin is a 16-year-old high school student at the time of filming the episode. She suffers from an illness with similarities to Bulimia, only she has no control over her actions. Everything that Lashay eats or drinks is almost immediately thrown up and she had very bad stomach cramping because of it. She expresses her bad experience with physicians who did not want to diagnose her because at only 16 years old she shows an almost exact reflection of an eating disorder. During her adolescence in 2014 her family went on a trip to Costa Rica where she had an encounter with a wild raccoon that tore at her skin. When she got back home from the trip only two days later she had severe symptoms of vomiting, headaches, neck pains and stomach pains. At first physicians thought it was rabies and immediately gave her the rabies vaccination, this however made everything extremely worse and all her symptoms progressed. Since that day in the emergency room she has yet to recover or improve from any of the symptoms. She's not able to walk straight up, sit in a chair, and has a constant throbbing headache. Due to her conditions doctors decided to implant a chest port to be able to provide her with the nutrients and hydration she needs to survive. One physician the family met with suggested she might have a Cerebral Spinal Fluid Leak that would only explain her constant headaches and dizziness. The treatment for the CSF leak is an extremely invasive procedure that only has a 30% success rate, the family took the chance with the procedure and Lashay had an extremely rough recovery period. Since the treatment none of her symptoms had improved at all.

Dr. Lisa Sanders took her story and published it into the Diagnosis column awaiting response from the audience. The audience came up with three general groups of possibilities, she could have a parasitic infection caused by the raccoon attack, POTS, or Rumination syndrome. POTS also known as Postural Orthostatic Tachycardia Syndrome is essentially a problem with the nervous system, specifically the nerves that control the blood vessels causing improper circulation and rapid heart rates resulting in dizziness, light-headedness, and at times vomiting. Rumination syndrome is a rare chronic functional disorder that affects the digestive system where the patient will automatically regurgitate the food and liquids consumed, this syndrome has no cure/treatments. The audience aside from the possible diagnosis also provided Lashay with hope and guidance through tough times. When Dr. Lisa Sanders went to consult with the family about the 3 possibilities, they automatically ruled out both POTS as well as any parasitic infection as they had been tested for almost every kind of parasite as well as received POTS treatment with no effect. The family then mentioned how Lashay had been tested for Rumination's via a M spike testing, which is testing the pressure at the lower esophageal sphincter, with results that are strongly suggestive of Rumination's. With this information, the family had a very strong denial in the fact that Lashay might have a chronic illness with no treatment instead of just a simple parasitic infection.

== Episode 6: Deja Vu ==
Matt Lee is a 20-year-old college student who suffers from fainting spells that only occur when he has a sense of Deja Vu, these fainting spells at times can cause his heart to stop all together. Matt states that when he was around 19, one day he just started feeling very light headed and had a sense of Deja Vu then shortly after he blacked out. When he woke back up and realized he had blacked out, he immediately went to the hospital, the next time he fainted had flatlined. Specifically his symptoms include a sense of tingling in his head that is followed by light-headedness, nausea, heart palpitations, loss of control, and then finally the Deja Vu before he faints. Matt is extremely afraid that these random fainting episodes could happen at any time during the day and he might not have someone to help him out, because of these he stays at home as much as he could. He expresses his disappointment in not being able to follow his goals in wanting to study computer science and wanting to find a cure or treatment that would allow him to be “free” again. Matt was admitted into Johns Hopkins Hospital for in depth testing of all his symptoms, the only definitive diagnosis known is the fact that Matt is experiencing Syncope. Syncope are essentially fainting spells that are caused by a decrease of blood reaching the brain, the only question is what is causing the decreased blood flow along with the other symptoms. Multiple testing was done to be able to narrow down whether his form of Syncope is caused by mental factors or cardiac abnormalities, the results are still pending.

Dr. Lisa Sanders took Matt’s story to the column and awaited for responses from the audience with ideas. Out of the hundreds of responses, only two were the most cohesive towards Matt’s symptoms. The first possibility was Vasovagal Syncope, where the nervous system will send an incorrect message too slow down the heart and can cause it to stop, the tilt table test performed on Matt could provide a definitive answer to this theory. The second possibility is Temporal lobe epilepsy which is a kind of seizure that is correlated to a sense of “strange” thoughts, feelings, or sense of Deja Vu. Matt was subjected to an EEG which did not show any preliminary seizure disorders, however the specialist who reviewed his results noted that the EEG might not express any deep temporal lobe seizures. The tilt table test performed on Matt came back negative for Vasovagal Syncope, however Matt was fitted with a heart tracker to be able to detect any abnormal signals within the heart during an episode. Matt finally had an episode with his heart loop tracker, the tracker was able to detect a 6 second heart stop during his episode. On the same day Matt had this episode he had another one once his stress level started to rise, this was the first time in the entire duration of his illness that he's had two episodes in one day. Dr. Lisa Sanders then questions if the episodes could be caused by an increase in stress, rooted by a traumatic stress episode within his early childhood involving custody actions between his mother and father. To help Matt out with the stress and psychological aspect of his illness, he was referred to a psychiatrist at Johns Hopkins that started him on cognitive behavioral therapy. While the cognitive therapy would help Matt out with his internal stress it might also help alleviate the severity of his episode until he is able to secure a valid diagnosis.

== Episode 7: Paralyzed ==
Joe is a 61 year old optimistic patient from Wallingford, CT. He was struck with a sudden and unexplained paralysis starting from his waist down, leaving him paraplegic. Ann is a 42 year old skeptic patient who is also from Wallingford, CT. She has intermittent paralysis where she could spend hours with the right side of her body immobile. She will then regain mobility but the paralysis always occurs again. Around the age of 59, Joe started to get pin & needles in his legs and at first he thought nothing of it until a year later he had numbness up to his knees that progressed to his waist. Eventually, the numbness turned into paralysis and Joe became a paraplegic at the age of 61. Shortly after becoming paralyzed, Joe went into a state of organ failure that doctors were able to get him out of but ever since he hasn't been able to leave the hospital. Despite visiting many hospitals such as Yale, Mayo, and Boston with no avail, he states he is still a firm believer in western medicine and is willing to try anything. Around the age of 40, Ann had a recurring pain in her chest that resembled heartburn and a month later noticed that the right side of her face looked off. When she brought this up to her primary care physician, he explained that she had full right side facial paralysis and needed to visit the emergency room as she might be having a stroke. When she got to the emergency room, her facial paralysis was coming in and out, because of this she was placed into the stroke ward for observation and a CAT scan and MRI was ordered that resulted negative. A neurologist came in and told her it was all just a psychosomatic response to stress and nothing more. A big reason she does not trust doctors is for the fact that she is a woman of color, and she feels she's not heard by the generic privileged doctor complex. When reaching out to Dr. Lisa Sanders, both Joe and Ann had already been tested and ruled out for dozens of diseases such as Multiple Sclerosis, Parkinson's, and Lupus. Joe specifically has two very serious illnesses, the first one being his unexplained paralysis and the second being an incurable form of blood cancer he was diagnosed with 15 years back. Joe thought he only had a few years to live, but he was placed on a clinical trial that has kept him alive until this day. Dr. Lisa Sanders now wants to know if his blood cancer has anything to do with his paralysis, especially now that he has movement in his toes.

Dr. Lisa Sanders published both Joe and Ann’s stories on different columns to gain different traction from the audience and to not create confusion. The first column published was for Joe’s symptoms and this generated hundreds of responses. The two most reasonable possibilities are CIDP, Chronic Inflammatory Polyneuropathy, aka Guillain-Barre syndrome or the paralysis is a side effect of the clinical drug, Ibrutinib, he is taking to control his blood cancer. CIDP is a neurological disorder caused by an injury to the protective coating of the nerves as they leave the brain. However, this was almost immediately ruled out by his physicians as testing was already done against the possibility of CIDP. Leaving the paralysis to be a rare side effect of the clinical drug, Ibrutinib Joe was taking to control his blood cancer, only he hasn't been taking the medication since a blood clot almost killed him. Dr. Lisa Sanders suggests that his regaining feeling in his toes is a result of Joe being off the medication, as it could take up to a year for the medication to fully leave his body and for the nerves to rebuild themselves. This raises the issue that if Joe stays off the medication he might be able to walk again but if he doesn't get back on he will have nothing controlling his blood cancer. Dr. Lisa Sanders later published Ann’s story on the column and awaited the response from the audience. The audience presented with many possibilities but Ann’s doctors had tested and ruled them all out except for two. The first possibility is Lyme Disease which is an infection caused by bacteria transmitted through ticks. While Ann’s symptoms are not in line with that of Lyme Disease, the disease is known for causing all kinds of strange and interesting neurological problems. The second possibility is that Ann has a Functional Neurological Disorder, where simply her body is not transmitting the correct signals. Since Ann is very much a skeptic when it comes to western medicine she did not take the thought of a functional neurological disorder lightly, she immediately denied the possibility and moved on to get tested for Lyme disease. Ann went to a specialist near her and was able to get tested for Lyme Disease but the results came back negative. Even with this evidence in front of her Ann kept denying the possibility of having a Functional Neurological Disorder, yet she still received a call from Dr. Schneider who may be able to help her get closer to a diagnosis.

== Production ==
The Netflix docuseries Diagnosis was a production created and produced by Netflix and The New York Times together. It draws from the column written by Dr. Lisa Sanders, who seeks to help patients whose conditions have not been diagnosed and resist treatment.

For these episodes, Sanders seeks to crowdsource diagnoses and treatments. She published each case in her column, Diagnosis, in The New York Times and invited readers to help solve each medical mystery. The emphasis is on the process of finding answers and patients are treated with respect. Doctors and patients from around the world have responded. Dr. Sanders has been able to provide each patient with a diagnosis of their case, sometimes leading to treatment, and also giving them a sense of belonging and hope.

Each patient’s journey through their diagnosis is shown in a 40-minute episode, where viewers can see the progression of a life-changing movement. The result from this project was a seven-episode docuseries. Diagnosis was released on August 16, 2019, on Netflix.
