= List of Late Night with Jimmy Fallon episodes =

This is the list of episodes for Late Night with Jimmy Fallon, an American late-night talk show that aired weeknights at 12:35 am Eastern/11:35 pm Central on NBC in the United States. The hour-long show aired from March 2, 2009 to February 7, 2014 and was hosted by actor, comedian and performer Jimmy Fallon, an alumnus of Saturday Night Live. Hip hop/neo soul band The Roots served as the show's house band, and Steve Higgins as the show's announcer.

== See also ==
- List of Late Night with Conan O'Brien episodes
- List of Late Night with Seth Meyers episodes
