= Chicken People =

- Directed by: Nicole Lucas Haimes
- Written by: Nicole Lucas Haimes
- Produced by: Julie Goldman; Caroline Kaplan; Chris Clements; Terry Leonard
- Cinematography: Martina Radwan
- Edited by: Kevin Klauber, A.C.E. Sara Booth
- Music by: Michael Hearst
- Production companies: Motto Pictures; Strongman; Haimes Film
- Distributed by: CMT; Samuel Goldwyn Films
- Release dates: 13 March 2016 (SXSW); 23 September 2016
- Running time: 83 minutes
- Country: United States
- Language: English

Chicken People is a 2016 documentary film about people who breed and raise chickens for exhibition. It is focused primarily on three subjects who compete in the Ohio National Poultry Show in Columbus, Ohio.

A number of reviewers compared it to the mockumentary Best in Show.

== Synopsis ==
After an overview of people who have a passion for raising poultry, the film focuses on three main characters — Brian Caraker, a musical theater performer from Branson, Missouri; Brian Knox, an engineer of high performance race engines from New Hampshire; and Shari McCollough, a homemaker from Crawfordsville, Indiana.

== Release ==
=== Critical response ===
Chicken People has received positive reviews from critics. Review aggregator Rotten Tomatoes gives the film an approval rating of 100% based on 20 reviews, with an average rating of 7.23/10. On Metacritic, the film has a score of 81 out of 100 based on 4 critics, indicating "universal acclaim".

Writing for The New York Times, Helen T. Verongos stated that "these chicken people, with deep connections to their birds, make for a fun and at times astonishing film." In a review for the Los Angeles Times, Katie Walsh wrote that "the film proves to be more than just a glimpse into a world that's easy to titter at. Haimes delves into the larger issues and psychological motivations that drive the kind of obsession that allows one to breed award-winning poultry." Joe Leydon, in a review for Variety, called it an "illuminating and amusingly entertaining look at the thriving subculture of competitive poultry breeders", and wrote that the film "generates a fair amount of suspense, [... but] it also abounds in moments of ineffably charming comic relief".

A review for The Village Voice criticized the filmmaker for not probing deep enough with some of the subjects and their "larger failure [...] in never finding much of a compelling reason for us to care about this subculture beyond surface geek-show intrigue."
