= Late Night with Jimmy Fallon =

American late-night talk show (2009–2014)

- Also known as: Late Night (franchise brand)
- Genre: Late-night talk show; Variety show
- Created by: David Letterman; Jimmy Fallon; Lorne Michaels
- Written by: A. D. Miles (head writer)
- Starring: Jimmy Fallon
- Announcer: Steve Higgins
- Music by: The Roots (house band)
- Opening theme: "Here I Come"
- Composer: The Roots
- Country of origin: United States
- Original language: English
- No. of seasons: 5
- No. of episodes: 969 (list of episodes)

Production
- Executive producers: Lorne Michaels; Michael Shoemaker
- Producer: Gavin Purcell
- Production locations: Studio 6B, (Note: For the final six months of the series, the show moved to Studio 6A.) NBC Studios, New York City, New York
- Camera setup: Multi-camera
- Running time: 62 minutes (with commercials)
- Production companies: Broadway Video; Universal Media Studios (2009–11); Universal Television (2011–14)

Original release
- Network: NBC
- Release: March 2, 2009 – February 7, 2014

Related
- The Tonight Show Starring Jimmy Fallon

Late Night with Jimmy Fallon is an American television talk show broadcast by NBC. The show was the third installment of the Late Night franchise. Hosted by Jimmy Fallon, it aired from March 2, 2009, to February 7, 2014, replacing Late Night with Conan O'Brien and was in turn replaced by Late Night with Seth Meyers. The show aired weeknights at 12:35 a.m. Eastern/11:35 p.m. Central, on NBC.

The third incarnation of the Late Night franchise originated by David Letterman, the program originated from NBC Studio 6B (and Studio 6A for the final six months of its run) in the Comcast Building at 30 Rockefeller Center in New York City. The show typically opened with a brief monologue from Fallon, followed by a comedy "desk piece," as well as prerecorded segments and audience competitions. The next segment was devoted to a celebrity interview, with guests ranging from actors and musicians to media personalities and political figures. Hip hop/neo soul band The Roots served as the show's house band, and Saturday Night Live writer and producer Steve Higgins was the show's announcer. The show then closed with either a musical or comedy performance, or a cooking segment. The show frequently employed digital media into its comedy, which became crucial to its success.

In 2013, Fallon was selected by NBC to succeed a retiring Jay Leno as host of The Tonight Show. The final episode of Late Night under Fallon aired one night after Leno's final episode of The Tonight Show on February 6, 2014. Most of the cast and crew immediately began working on The Tonight Show Starring Jimmy Fallon, which premiered on February 17, 2014.

Seth Meyers was named as Fallon's replacement, and Late Night with Seth Meyers debuted after the Sochi Olympics.

The show's ratings remained above its rival shows throughout most of the series' run. In 2011, the show garnered two Emmy Award nominations, including Outstanding Variety, Music or Comedy Series.

== Format ==
The show began with the opening sequence, showing Fallon sprinting through New York City, sharing a laugh with a police officer, and getting into a taxi. As The Roots played the show's theme, a sped-up version of their 2006 song "Here I Come", Steve Higgins introduced the show with "From Studio 6B/6A in Rockefeller Center, the National Broadcasting Company presents: Late Night with Jimmy Fallon!", and announced that night's guests and "the legendary Roots crew". Just before Higgins introduced Fallon, the camera cut to a shot of The Roots, with drummer and bandleader Questlove, rapper and lead vocalist Tariq "Black Thought" Trotter, percussionist Frank Knuckles, guitarist and vocalist Captain Kirk Douglas, bassist Owen Biddle (later Mark Kelley), and sousaphonist Damon "Tuba Gooding Jr." Bryson standing on the ground level, and keyboardists Kamal Gray and James Poyser sitting above them on an iron balcony. Questlove then shouted three numbers symbolizing the episode number of Late Night (though other numbers and statements have also been shouted in place based on current events, cities if that episode's number matches a particular city's area codes, and historical show moments - toward the end of the show's run, Questlove would shout how many episodes remained rather than the number of the show itself). Occasionally, Black Thought joined Questlove in shouting the episode number. As the camera panned over to the main stage, some members of The Roots performed actions to get the camera's attention (Black Thought gave a karate yell, Knuckles saluted, Douglas did a windmill chord, and Bryson smiled while flashing a peace sign). The camera then settled on the curtains, and as Questlove transitioned into a drumroll, a spotlight shone on the center of the curtains, and an offscreen Higgins introduced Fallon with a drawn-out "And here he is, Jimmy Fallon!" The curtains then parted, revealing Fallon, who walked out to the cheering audience as The Roots continued playing "Here I Come". After the song ended, Fallon finished accepting the applause, welcomed the audience and viewers to the show, and began his brief monologue, frequently interacting with Higgins, Questlove, and/or Black Thought, who would serve as straight man to Fallon's comedic take on current events. Fallon often gave the cue cards for a joke to audience members if the joke fell particularly flat. Fallon would then segue directly from the final punchline of his monologue into saying, "Ladies and gentlemen, we've got a great show for you tonight. Give it up for The Roots!", who would play briefly as Fallon walked to his desk.

After the monologue, Fallon typically performed a comedy "desk piece." Some were weekly: "Pros and Cons" on Tuesdays, and "Late Night Hashtags" on Thursdays. Fridays were also reserved for Fallon to write "Thank You Notes" to figures that have given him material for the past week. The popularity of these "Thank You Notes" led to the release of two books full of the favorites. He also sometimes had the entire crew of the show write letters home.

After the desk piece ended and a commercial break followed, typically there was a competition involving players selected from the studio audience. These included "Wheel of Carpet Samples," "Wax on Wax off," "Cell Phone Shootout," "Models and Buckets," "Lick it for Ten," "Let Us Play with Your Look," "Put It In Reverse," and "Hot Dog in a Hole." Occasionally the segment featured a group-performance competition, "Battle of the Instant Bands" or "Battle of the Instant Dance Crews."

In the show's third segment, the first guest arrived. That guest usually stayed after the next break, then either played a game with Jimmy and some audience members, or performed in a skit with Jimmy. Next, a second guest entered after the show's third break. Once these interviews were completed and the show had taken its final commercial break, the musical guest (or sometimes, a chef or comedian) performed. Once the musical guest finished, Fallon thanked his guests and bid the viewers farewell. As credits rolled, Fallon ran up and down the stairs of the studio giving high fives to the audience before exiting backstage.

Show set in January 2011

== History ==
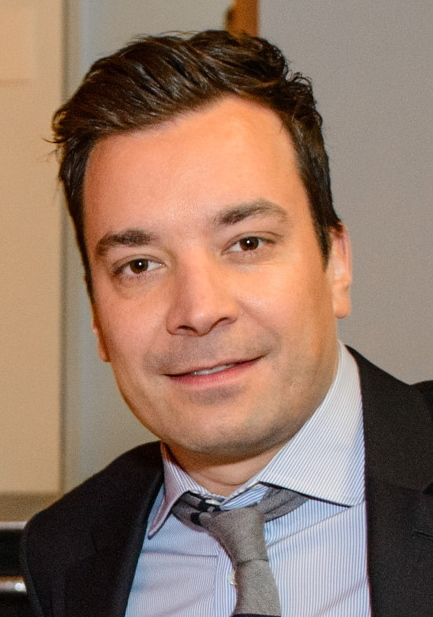
Fallon in 2013

In 2004, NBC announced that in five years, Late Night host Conan O'Brien would replace Jay Leno as the host of The Tonight Show. Fallon, at the time, had just left Saturday Night Live, and was pursuing a movie career. SNL executive producer Lorne Michaels was the first to suggest to the comedian that he'd be perfect to fill O'Brien's empty seat. Michaels said he wanted Fallon to be the new host dating back to the day that Fallon left Saturday Night Live, which occurred only a few months before O'Brien's departure was announced. Michaels, a staunch advocate of Fallon, urged NBC to give Fallon a holding deal in February 2007 so that he couldn't be lured elsewhere.

According to Michaels:

Jimmy's built for this kind of show. He's funny, he's charming, he's got a really good way of connecting with people. And he knows music, movies and TV really well, which is the backbone of these shows.

Fallon wasn't approached by NBC until early 2008. Fallon's movie career, self-admittedly "hadn't worked out that great," and NBC contacted him to become O'Brien's replacement. The network had a couple of other candidates in mind to replace Conan, but Michaels insisted he'd only produce the show with Fallon as host. In May 2008, NBC announced that Fallon would be O'Brien's replacement, "an announcement that was met with some bewilderment, even snickers," recalled New York. At the time of the announcement, he was scheduled to debut in June 2009. Michaels soon tasked Fallon with "training" for the gig by returning to his stand-up roots; for eight months, Fallon toured college campuses and comedy clubs, where he tested out a new, 50-minute routine. In addition, Michaels and Fallon assembled a "well-pedigreed" team for Late Night, including longtime SNL producers Steve Higgins and Michael Shoemaker as announcer and showrunner, respectively, and celebrated hip-hop group The Roots as the house band. Before the show debuted, Conan O'Brien sent a large plastic pickle to Fallon's office, accompanied by a handwritten note reflecting the ritual: "The Letterman people sent this pickle to my office in 1993. Now I'm passing it on to you. Whenever you leave, which won't be for a long time, make sure you pass it on to the next sap." (Fallon, in turn, presented the pickle on-air to incoming "Late Night" host Seth Meyers on January 28, 2014.) In an early sketch about recording promos for the show's debut, Fallon's announcer, Steve Higgins, joked: "You loved him on SNL. You hated him in the movies. Now, you're ambivalent."

The show's time slot briefly came under question during the 2010 Tonight Show conflict. Fallon announced that the show would be bumped to a 1:05 am start time, with the move of The Jay Leno Show to 11:35 p.m. and subsequent bump of The Tonight Show with Conan O'Brien to 12:05 a.m. start. This proved to be false, as O'Brien refused the change, citing a reluctance to infringe upon Late Night, and saying it would be "unfair to Jimmy." Fallon was then next in line to succeed Leno, set to begin his stint on The Tonight Show on February 17, 2014. Saturday Night Live cast member and "Weekend Update" anchor Seth Meyers was announced as Fallon's replacement on Late Night. The final episode of Late Night with Jimmy Fallon aired on February 7, 2014, the day of the start of the NBC coverage of the Winter Olympics. Andy Samberg and The Muppets were Fallon's final guests.

=== Debut episode ===
The show premiered on March 2, 2009, with Robert De Niro, Justin Timberlake, Nick Carter and Van Morrison appearing as Fallon's first guests. Former Late Night host Conan O'Brien also made a cameo appearance in the beginning. The Hollywood Reporter described the episode: "Fallon opened with a fairly traditional monologue that drew few laughs, followed by a couple of prepared bits that were long on ambition but failed to connect." Bits introduced during the show's debut night were "Slow Jam the News" and "Lick it for Ten." The Los Angeles Times, in retrospect, referred to it as "an uneven beginning," recalling: "Fallon booked one of the world's worst interview subjects, Robert De Niro, as his first guest, and the acknowledged irony—De Niro was asked questions he could answer in a single word—did not make the interview any better, or funny." Timberlake was Fallon's second guest offering, "ebullient in doing dead-on impressions of John Mayer and Michael McDonald" before matching off-camera against long-time "rival" Nick Carter in an arm-wrestling match that Carter ultimately won. Van Morrison was the show's first musical guest. Fallon acknowledged possible roughness, saying the intimacy of late-night shows demands early modulating: "We're going to find our style. I know I'm gonna get reviewed off the first show, as opposed to the first couple of months."

=== Final episode ===
Fallon hosted his final episode of Late Night on February 7, 2014, one day after Jay Leno hosted his final Tonight Show. Jimmy welcomed former SNL castmate Andy Samberg as his final guest. After a brief retrospective with Higgins about their time on Late Night, the show ended with Fallon playing drums and singing backup to "The Weight" behind an ensemble of Dr. Teeth and the Electric Mayhem and various other Muppets. Upon the conclusion of the song, Fallon exited Studio 6A, and walked silently down the hall to Studio 6B (through a door featuring his Tonight Show logo), where his cast and crew awaited him with an ovation. The ratings for Fallon's final episode set an all-time high for his tenure as host, being seen by over 6.6 million viewers. Fallon's final Late Night broadcast aired on NBC thirty minutes earlier than normal, and followed the Opening Ceremonies of the 2014 Winter Olympic Games and late local news.

=== Sexual discrimination accusation ===
On July 28, 2010, former stage manager Paul Tarascio accused Jimmy Fallon and the producers of Late Night of sexually discriminating against him. Tarascio alleged he was demoted and then lost his job to what he describes as a "less qualified" woman because, "Jimmy just prefers to take direction from a woman." Following the demotion, Tarascio continued to protest the change, including complaints directed to his union representative, and was subsequently fired based on a list of job failures provided by NBC. An NBC spokeswoman said that claims of sexual discrimination were "without merit".

== Production ==
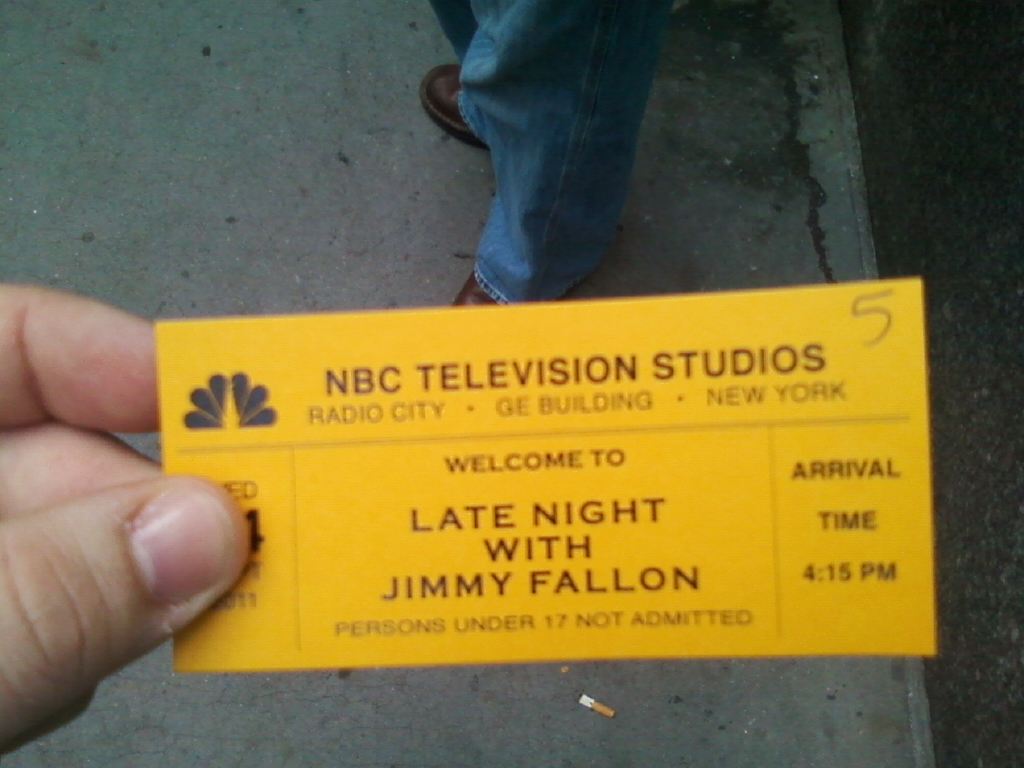
A ticket to the show on September 14, 2011

The program was taped at NBC Studio 6B in the GE Building at 30 Rockefeller Center in New York City, the original home of The Tonight Show Starring Johnny Carson, until August 2013. In September 2013, the show moved to an identically-recreated set across the hall in Studio 6A, so that 6B could be remodeled for the return of The Tonight Show to New York in 2014. Studio 6A is the studio from which Late Night had been broadcast during the Letterman and O'Brien eras, while 6B had housed the WNBC News 4 New York studios since Carson moved his show to Burbank, California, in 1972.

The show's house band was hip hop/neo soul band The Roots, and its announcer was Steve Higgins, a producer for Saturday Night Live. It was produced by Lorne Michaels' Broadway Video in association with NBC's television arm Universal Television (although copyright notices for Late Night, like select NBC Programming, read "© (year) NBC Studios, Inc".).

Tapings began at 5:30 p.m. for same-day broadcast; audiences arrived as much as 90 minutes in advance, which allowed for warm-up by a staff member ("try to find everything funnier than normal"); in between guests, Fallon recorded custom promotional clips for the NBC affiliates.

=== Online presence ===
We're not trying to ignore the fact that people are in front of a computer at work and surf the Web all day long, or that kids check the Internet when they get home from school. We want to exploit that, and have fun with it. I'm on Facebook and I've been on Twitter just talking to my fans. It's amazing!

— Jimmy Fallon, prior to the show premiering in 2009

The incorporation of the Internet was an innovation decided long before the show began. Highlighting interactivity, Fallon dove into the Web prior to the show premiering, creating a Twitter account and beginning a vlog on the show's official website, which ran snippets of comedy bits and background reports on how he was building the show. The show's Web site was staffed by three full-time bloggers, who compile viral videos and post photos. Questlove tweeted during tapings of the show. "I think a lot of shows don't use the Internet as well as they could," said Fallon in 2009. "The Internet has been awesome," he added. "They've got my back."

Online interaction and its presence on the show were crucial to its success. Fallon devoted considerable time and resources to incorporating digital ideas into his comedy—"he sits at his desk behind a Mac, not a microphone"—focusing especially on social media, which connects the younger audience.

Fallon published a welcome video for the Late Night YouTube Channel in May 2013; the channel featured segments such as "Ask Jimmy," "Night News Now," and "Web Exclusives." Many of the videos received a very high number of views, including the ""#Hashtag" with Jimmy Fallon & Justin Timberlake" clip that had garnered over 17 million views by October 21, 2013. During the open letter controversy between musical artists Miley Cyrus and Sinéad O'Connor, the channel published an a cappella version of Cyrus' song "We Can't Stop" on October 8, 2013, in which Fallon and The Roots also perform.

=== Music ===
Music was a signature part of the humor of Late Night with Jimmy Fallon. Fallon employed impressions of celebrities and used song parodies that rest in "borderline-surreal pop cultural juxtapositions," such as Fallon impersonating Neil Young singing the theme to The Fresh Prince of Bel-Air. Many of the sketches went viral; the first among these was Brian Williams' appearance for "Slow Jam the News," a bit where Fallon and The Roots turned news stories into a "sexy R&B song." Some of Late Night's most famous musical moments included Paul McCartney joining Fallon to sing "Scrambled Eggs"—the working title of "Yesterday"—using the original whimsical filler lyrics, as well as President Barack Obama's appearance to "Slow Jam the News." An article in The Huffington Post credited music as crucial to the show's success: "Late Night with Jimmy Fallon almost instantly became a fun, must-watch talk show largely because Jimmy fully embraced the musical opportunities afforded to him." In 2012, the musical pieces were compiled together as a primetime NBC special, aptly titled Jimmy Fallon's Primetime Music Special, and remastered for the album Blow Your Pants Off.

The show received widespread acclaim for its musical performances, which ranged from superstars such as Bruce Springsteen, Beyoncé and Kanye West to up-and-comers such as Lorde, Kendrick Lamar and Ed Sheeran, all of whom made their network TV debuts on Late Night. Fallon was heavily involved in choosing the musical guests, in tandem with music booker Jonathan Cohen and Roots bandleader Questlove.

Other artists who made their network TV debuts on Late Night include: Frank Ocean, Kacey Musgraves, Florida Georgia Line, Macklemore & Ryan Lewis, Carly Rae Jepsen, Odd Future, Eric Church, Panda Bear, Gary Clark Jr., Chvrches, Grimes, Sun Kil Moon, Sky Ferreira, Disclosure and Sam Smith, Jake Owen, Of Monsters and Men, The Dismemberment Plan, M83, Ellie Goulding, 2 Chainz, A$AP Rocky, Tame Impala, Beach House, Walk the Moon, The War on Drugs, Phantogram, Savages, Joey Badass, Unknown Mortal Orchestra, Parquet Courts, Sharon Van Etten, Courtney Barnett, Pinback, Frightened Rabbit and Passion Pit.

Late Night featured a number of legendary and cult-classic acts who had not performed on American television in many years. In 2009, the show reunited influential Washington, D.C.–based post-punk group Jawbox for its first performance in 12 years. Other artists of this type who broke long hiatuses from American TV performances on Late Night included The Specials (30 years), The Cars (24 years), Big Audio Dynamite (21 years), Mazzy Star (19 years), Superchunk (16 years), Sunny Day Real Estate (15 years), Pulp (14 years), Portishead (13 years) and the Afghan Whigs (13 years). Swedish rock band Refused also made its American TV debut 13 years after its original breakup when it performed in July 2012 on the show.

The show broke ground with thematic music-centric weeks, including tributes to The Rolling Stones, Bob Marley, Pink Floyd and Pearl Jam, during which high-profile contemporary artists covered those bands' songs. In March 2013, Late Night devoted a full week to Justin Timberlake, during which Timberlake performed music from his then-new album The 20/20 Experience on five consecutive shows and appeared in a different comedy sketch during each show.

== Reception ==
=== Critical response ===
Although the show received much acclaim, the debut episode received mixed to negative reviews across the board and was considered to have "arrived needing plenty of work." In particular, critics noted Fallon's nervousness and profuse sweating as well as awkward comedy pieces like "Lick It for 10." However, interaction with the show's house band, The Roots, was applauded and it was noted that "a bit in which Fallon sang a "slow jam" version of the news succeeded, in large part, thanks to The Roots' typically taut playing and singer Tariq 'Black Thought' Trotter's impeccable voice and surprisingly good comic timing." The LA Times commented that "the late-night role seems on the face of it a good fit" for Jimmy Fallon and that "this is a form that develops in the fullness of time, as chances are taken and limits tested and you learn the things you can learn only in the doing, night after night." The show's first season scored a 48/100 on Metacritic, and viewers rated it at a 5/10.

Reviews grew much more positive over time, and the show received an Emmy nomination for Outstanding Variety, Music or Comedy Series each year beginning in 2011 and continuing through the end of the show. In 2010, New York complimented Fallon's "good humor" and noted his improvement: "In the relative safety of his 12:35 a.m. time slot, Fallon has been cultivating a distinct, and refreshing, strain of humor: the comedy of unabashed celebration." The same year, a Los Angeles Times piece titled "Jimmy Fallon, you're growing on us" complimented his excitement and charm: "Whatever tentativeness Fallon showed has long dissipated, and what he lacks in penetrating insight, ... he makes up in enthusiasm." In 2012, the New York Times called Fallon "one of the hot acts in late night with younger viewers," attributing the show's success to the show's "original comedy ideas" (skits such as Spanx or no Spanx with John M from New Jersey) and Fallon's own performance.

== American late-night talk show ratings ==
Season	Nielsen rank	Nielsen rating	Tied with
2009-10	5	1.4	"The Daily Show", "The Colbert Report"
2010-11	3	1.8	N/A
2011-12	4	1.7	"The Daily Show"
2012-13	4	1.7	N/A
2013-14	4	1.9	N/A

Despite cautious reviews, the show was a ratings favorite during its premiere week. The show outperformed its main competitor, CBS's The Late Late Show with Craig Ferguson, by half a million viewers. Fallon also managed a higher viewer total than his predecessor, Conan O'Brien. Fallon's total viewer count was 21% higher than Conan O'Brien's 1,991,000 Late Night average that season. Fallon maintained his lead over Ferguson until the night of March 16 when The Late Late Show with Craig Ferguson attracted a larger audience (1.47 vs. 1.27 million viewers).

For the week July 27–31, 2009, Late Night was the ratings leader with a 17 percent lead in adults 18–49 and a 42 percent lead with adults 18–34. Since the show aired on March 2, Fallon has ranked number one or tied Ferguson in these demographics on 97/100 nights.

After Jay Leno returned to The Tonight Show, in total viewers Late Night (2.0 million viewers overall) out-delivered The Late Late Show (1.7 million) by a margin of 17 percent the entire first week.

In the May 2010 sweeps, Late Night had a higher rating, a roughly equal share, but fewer average viewers, than The Late Late Show. The two were tied in the demographic of adults age 18 to 49, with Late Night having a slightly higher share.

In the May 2011 sweeps, all of NBC's late night programming reported increased viewership. Late Night with Jimmy Fallon reported a 13% increase in viewership compared to the previous year. Late Night, though, managed to beat The Late Late Show by a very small margin.

On February 6, 2014, Jay Leno hosted his last episode of his second tenure as host of The Tonight Show, and brought in Leno's biggest overall audience since the night of the Seinfeld finale in 1998. Boosted by the big lead-in, Late Night with Jimmy Fallon had its largest viewership ever with 6 million viewers. This was the highest number for the Late Night franchise since David Letterman's Late Night finale in 1993. The ratings were bested the next day by Fallon's last show, when over 6.6 million viewers watched. On that occasion, no Tonight Show was produced, and Late Night aired thirty minutes earlier than normal, at 12:05 a.m. ET on NBC, following the 2014 Winter Olympics Opening Ceremonies and late local news.

== International ==
- Late Night originally aired in Australia on The Comedy Channel along with The Tonight Show, however both were dropped following Leno's reinstatement citing a decline in viewership. In November 2010 after a few months of being off the air, The Comedy Channel's Group Programming Director Darren Chau announced that Late Night would resume airing from December 7, this time without accompanying The Tonight Show. For the relaunch, the Comedy Channel was re-branded as the Jimmy Channel for one day with Jimmy Fallon hosting the entire evening line-up counting down to the return of Late Night with Jimmy Fallon. The Comedy Channel's Late Night with Jimmy Fallon promotional campaign won Gold at the 2011 world Promax Awards in New York, and Silver at the 2011 Australian Promax Awards. It now airs on ABC2.
- In the Middle East, Late Night aired on OSN Comedy Channel, part of the Orbit Showtime Network.
- In Finland, the show was aired on a channel called TV Viisi (TV Five).
- In France, the show aired with new episodes a day after their initial airing in the US on MCM and Canal + with French subtitles.
- In Portugal, the show was aired on SIC Radical, but was dropped when rights to broadcast Conan were secured.
- In Canada, the show aired on CTV at the same time as the U.S. NBC. The show was also rerun the next day at 3:00 p.m. on MuchMusic.
- In Turkey, the show aired on Bloomberg HT every night.
- In the United Kingdom and Ireland, the show aired with new episodes a day after their initial airing in the US on CNBC.

Beginning in late February 2012, Late Night aired across Europe on CNBC Europe, replacing The Tonight Show with Jay Leno which occupied the slot for many years. The show aired in a 30-minute condensed version Mondays-Fridays at 00.00 CET. On Saturdays and Sundays two episodes aired per night from 21.00 CET in the full 45-minute version. The episodes aired on a one-day delay from transmission in the USA.

- In Germany, Liechtenstein and Switzerland, the show airs at variable times between 23:00 and midnight Monday to Friday on One (still called einsFestival on the EPG). An omnibus of all the episodes from the week are shown on Saturdays in between midnight and 04:00
- In Asia, Late Night aired back-to-back each Saturday/Sunday (8 p.m. to 1 a.m.) and Sunday/Monday (11 p.m. to 4 a.m.) on CNBC Asia. The schedule applied to Brunei, China, Hong Kong, Indonesia, Malaysia, Singapore and Thailand.

== Awards and nominations ==
Year	Award	Category	Result
2010	Primetime Emmy Award	Outstanding Short Form Picture Editing	Won
2011	Primetime Emmy Award	Outstanding Variety, Music or Comedy Series	Nominated
2011	Primetime Emmy Award	Outstanding Writing for a Variety, Music or Comedy Series	Nominated
2011	Primetime Emmy Award	Outstanding Creative Achievement in Interactive Media	Nominated
2012	Primetime Emmy Award	Outstanding Variety Series	Nominated
2013	Primetime Emmy Award	Outstanding Variety Series	Nominated

== See also ==
- List of Late Night with Jimmy Fallon episodes
- List of Late Night with Jimmy Fallon games and sketches
- List of late-night American network TV programs

Media offices
Preceded by Late Night with Conan O'Brien	Late Night era by host 2 March 2009 – 7 February 2014	Succeeded by Late Night with Seth Meyers
Preceded by none	Jimmy Fallon talk show 2 March 2009 – 7 February 2014	Succeeded by The Tonight Show Starring Jimmy Fallon
