= Every Patient Tells a Story: Medical Mysteries and the Art of Diagnosis =

2009 book by Lisa Sanders

Every Patient Tells a Story: Medical Mysteries and the Art of Diagnosis is a 2009 non-fiction book by Lisa Sanders.

== Summary ==
In the book, Sanders writes about medical mysteries and how real-life doctors deal with and solve these issues to save human lives. It is an exploration of the difficulties doctors face in dealing with patient disease and illness and she depicts these difficulties through the stories of real-life accounts.

Sanders highlights the importance of the patient doctor relationship and the increasing depersonalization that is associated with medicine causing serious implications in patient care.

In the novel, she advocates for the proper training of physicians in all things science as well as in basic patient care such as taking adequate time to do a proper physical examination. She highlights certain physician errors and provides advice on how to better medical practice.

== Reception ==
Daniel W. Foster, writing for the Journal of Clinical Investigation, stated that Every Patient Tells a Story is "well written, and while it may be a little too technical at times for nonmedical readers and not quite scientific enough at times for physicians, both audiences will likely enjoy it." Pauline Chen reviewed the book for The New York Times, noting that Sanders "takes readers on an examination of the tools of diagnosis, touching upon the obvious and the not-so-obvious".

Druin Burch, for New Scientist, wrote that the book puts medical rarities "into a wider context, offering up a profound view of how doctors think".
