= Rita Moreno: Just a Girl Who Decided to Go for It =

2021 film directed by Mariem Pérez Riera

- Theatrical release poster
- Directed by: Mariem Pérez Riera
- Produced by: Mariem Pérez Riera; Brent Miller
- Starring: Rita Moreno; Eva Longoria; George Chakiris; Gloria Estefan; Héctor Elizondo; Karen Olivo; Justina Machado; Lin-Manuel Miranda; Mitzi Gaynor; Morgan Freeman; Norman Lear; Terrence McNally; Whoopi Goldberg
- Cinematography: Pedro Juan Lopez
- Edited by: Kevin Klauber; Mariem Pérez Riera
- Music by: Kathryn Bostic
- Production companies: American Masters; Act III Productions; Artemis Rising Foundation; Maramara Films
- Distributed by: Roadside Attractions
- Release dates: January 29, 2021 (Sundance); June 18, 2021 (United States)
- Running time: 90 minutes
- Country: United States
- Language: English
- Box office: $264,626

Rita Moreno: Just a Girl Who Decided to Go for It is a 2021 American documentary film, directed, produced, and edited by Mariem Pérez Riera. The film follows Rita Moreno, focusing on her early life and career. Norman Lear, Lin-Manuel Miranda, and Michael Kantor serve as executive producers.

The film had its world premiere at the 2021 Sundance Film Festival on January 29, 2021. It was released on June 18, 2021, by Roadside Attractions.

== Synopsis ==
For over 70 years, Rita Moreno has inspired audiences with her performances, the film follows her journey from her childhood to stardom.

== Cast ==
- Rita Moreno
- Eva Longoria
- George Chakiris
- Gloria Estefan
- Emilio Estefan
- Héctor Elizondo
- Karen Olivo
- Justina Machado
- Sonia Manzano
- Lin-Manuel Miranda
- Mitzi Gaynor
- Chita Rivera
- Morgan Freeman
- Norman Lear
- Terrence McNally
- Whoopi Goldberg
- Annette Insdorf
- Jackie Speier
- America Ferrera

== Production ==
In July 2019, it was announced PBS would produce and distribute a documentary film revolving around Rita Moreno with Norman Lear and Lin-Manuel Miranda were set to executive produce.

== Release ==
The film had its world premiere at the 2021 Sundance Film Festival on January 29. In March 2021, Roadside Attractions acquired distribution rights to the film, and set it for a June 18, 2021, release. It grossed $264,626 by the time it completed its theatrical run on July 29, 2021. It became available on DVD and streaming on July 16, 2021. It was later broadcast on American Masters on PBS on October 5, 2021. As of December 7, 2021, it still remains available for free on Netflix and can be purchased or rented on streaming services.

== Reception ==
On Rotten Tomatoes, the film has an approval rating of 95% based on reviews from 109 critics, with an average rating of 8/10. The website's critics consensus reads: "An affecting profile of screen legend Rita Moreno, Just a Girl is at once a sharp critique of the industry's crushing inequities and a beautiful homage to an artist who never backed down despite the odds."

The film won the "Best Documentary by or About Women" award from the Women Film Critics Circle.
