= Lisa Sanders =

American physician

- Born: July 24, 1956 (age 70)
- Education: College of William & Mary (BA); Yale University (MD)

Lisa Sanders (born July 24, 1956) is an American physician, medical author and journalist, and associate professor of internal medicine and education at Yale School of Medicine. In 2002, she began writing a column for The New York Times called Diagnosis, which covered medical mystery cases. She is an attending physician at Yale-New Haven Hospital. Her column was the inspiration for the television series House M.D., with Yale-New Haven Hospital serving as the model for Princeton-Plainsboro Hospital in the series. Sanders worked as a consultant on the show. In 2019, Netflix aired the program Diagnosis, featuring a selection of cases from her column.

== Biography ==
Lisa Sanders was born on July 24, 1956. She grew up in South Carolina. As a child, she loved reading about Arthur Conan Doyle’s fictional detective, Sherlock Holmes.

She majored in English at the College of William & Mary, writing for the school paper, The Flat Hat, and tending bar at a local tavern. She graduated in 1979. After graduation, she was hired by ABC News. Sanders won an Emmy for her reporting on Hurricane Hugo for CBS News. But she began to grow tired of working in the newsroom environment. As a journalist, she was particularly drawn to stories about medicine and, after seeing a fellow journalist (who was also a medical doctor) save someone's life after a boating accident, she decided to pursue a career in the field. She soon enrolled in the postbaccalaureate pre-medicine program at Columbia University to fulfill the requirements for medical school admission. Sanders has joked that she was accepted by Yale School of Medicine in a slot reserved for "weirdos"—entering at age 36, she was considered a "non-traditional" student, but one presumably enriched by life experience and work in other fields. She graduated from Yale as the oldest member of her medical school class and went on to complete residency there, ultimately serving as chief resident. She then joined Yale's Department of Internal Medicine and became an assistant clinical professor of medicine at the School of Medicine, teaching in the Primary Care Residency Program at Waterbury Hospital. She also became an attending physician at Yale-New Haven Hospital.

When I got to the third year [of medical school], when you actually get out of the classroom and go into the hospital and see how doctors work, I saw that what I thought of diagnosis was was [sic] wrong much of the time—or for the most exciting parts, in any case...I found out that [diagnosing] was not the multiplication tables, but it was [more like] Sherlock Holmes.

One day, a friend of hers, who worked for The New York Times Magazine, asked her "What can doctors write?" The conversation sparked an idea and, in 2002, she began writing a column for The New York Times called Diagnosis, that covered medical mystery cases. She finds her stories from her own patients as well as from those of her colleagues. The column was the inspiration for the 2004 television series House M.D., and the fictional Princeton-Plainsboro Hospital was fashioned after Yale-New Haven Hospital. She served as a consultant on the show, coming up with diseases for the episodes and correcting medical errors in the scripts. In 2010, she began crowdsourcing the diagnoses of her cases after hearing the story of an academic who successfully invited members of a medical website to diagnose the cause of his fevers. Additionally, in her column for the Well Blog column, called Think Like a Doctor, she posts symptoms to illnesses for her readers to solve before posting the diagnosis the following day. Producer Scott Rudin, in conjunction with the production company Lightbox, approached the Times with an idea for a documentary series. Beginning in April 2018, Sanders and the show's producers began publishing unsolved medical mysteries to the column, inviting input from the public. Thousands responded, and provided stories and content for the Netflix show Diagnosis, which debuted on August 16, 2019.

Aside from her column, Sanders has also published books. In 2009, she published the book Every Patient Tells a Story: Medical Mysteries and the Art of Diagnosis , about the diagnostic value of patient interviews and their neglect relative to tests. Her 2019 book, Diagnosis: Solving the Most Baffling Medical Mysteries, is a compilation of more than 50 stories from her column. She likes to rise early when writing—at 4:00 AM to work on her books and at 5:00 AM for her column, saying it is the time of day when she is "smartest."

She is married to the writer Jack Hitt, and the couple has two children.

== Bibliography ==
- The Perfect Fit Diet: Combine What Science Knows About Weight Loss With What You Know About Yourself. Rodale International Ltd, (January 3, 2004). ISBN 978-1-4050-7740-8
- The Perfect Fit Diet: How to Lose Weight, Keep it Off and Still Eat the Foods You Love. St. Martin's Griffin (December 27, 2005) ISBN 0-312-33823-6
- Every Patient Tells a Story: Medical Mysteries and the Art of Diagnosis . Broadway, (August 11, 2009). ISBN 978-0-7679-2246-3
- Diagnosis : solving the most baffling medical mysteries. Broadway Books. August 13, 2019. ISBN 978-0-593-13663-8.
