= Jonathan Cohen (television executive) =

- Born: Akron, Ohio
- Education: Indiana University
- Occupations: Television executive, journalist, author

Jonathan Cohen is an American journalist, author, and television executive. He served as the talent executive for music at NBC's The Tonight Show Starring Jimmy Fallon from the launch of the show until February 2015, and held the same role during Fallon's 2009–2014 run as the host of Late Night with Jimmy Fallon. Cohen was noted for booking a mix of superstars, rare performances from long-dormant acts, and developing artists. Cohen, previously a writer and editor at Billboard, is the author of the book Pearl Jam 20, the print accompaniment to Cameron Crowe's 2011 documentary.

Cohen was born in Akron, Ohio, and grew up across the street from singer/songwriter Joseph Arthur. He majored in journalism at Indiana University Bloomington (1994–1998).
