= Yale New Haven Hospital =

- Yale New Haven Health System

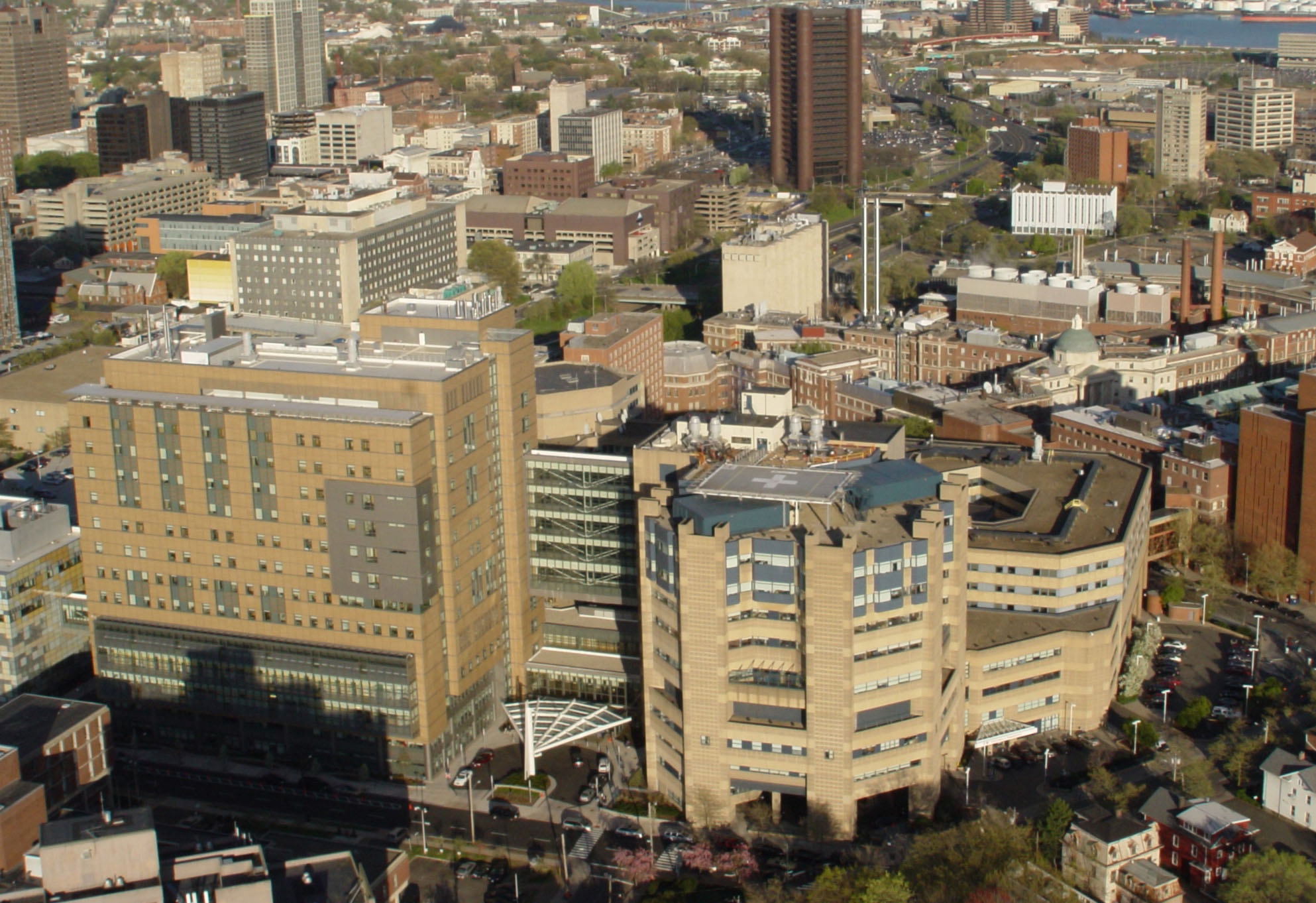
- Aerial view of the Yale New Haven Hospital campus

Geography
- Location: New Haven, Connecticut, U.S.
- Coordinates: 41°18′14″N 72°56′10″W

Organisation
- Care system: Private
- Affiliated university: Yale School of Medicine

Services
- Emergency department: Level I Adult Trauma Center, Level I Pediatric Trauma Center
- Beds: 1,541 which includes: 168 for Smilow Cancer Hospital at Yale New Haven; 201 for Yale New Haven Children's Hospital; 76 for Yale New Haven Psychiatric Hospital

Helipads
- Helipad: FAA LID: 1CT2
Number	Length		Surface
Number	ft	m	Surface
H1	48x72	15x22	Asphalt

History
- Opened: 1826

Links
- Website: www.ynhh.org
- Lists: Hospitals in U.S.

Yale New Haven Hospital (YNHH) is a 1,541-bed teaching hospital located in New Haven, Connecticut. It is the second-largest hospital in the United States and one of the largest in the world. It is the primary teaching hospital for the Yale School of Medicine and the Yale School of Nursing. Owned and operated by the Yale New Haven Health System, YNHH includes the 168-bed Smilow Cancer Hospital at Yale New Haven, the 201-bed Yale New Haven Children's Hospital, and the 76-bed Yale New Haven Psychiatric Hospital.

The hospital is a Magnet hospital and is accredited by the Joint Commission. It is also a Level I trauma center for adult and pediatric patients. It operates a pediatric critical care transport team including registered nurses, respiratory therapists, and physicians who transfer pediatric patients from smaller community hospitals to Yale New Haven Children's Hospital. In 2021, YNHH was ranked nationally in 8 of 15 specialties by U.S. News & World Report: Psychiatry (#11); Geriatrics (#21); Diabetes and Endocrinology (#33); Pulmonology (#27); Neurology and Neurosurgery (#42); Kidney Disorders (#35); Gastroenterology (#45); Ear, Nose and Throat (#47); and Gynecology (#47).

In 2020, the hospital had more than 1.3 million outpatient visits, 128,382 emergency room visits and 68,894 inpatient discharges. YNHH is among the largest employers in New Haven, with 14,592 employees as of 2020.

== History ==
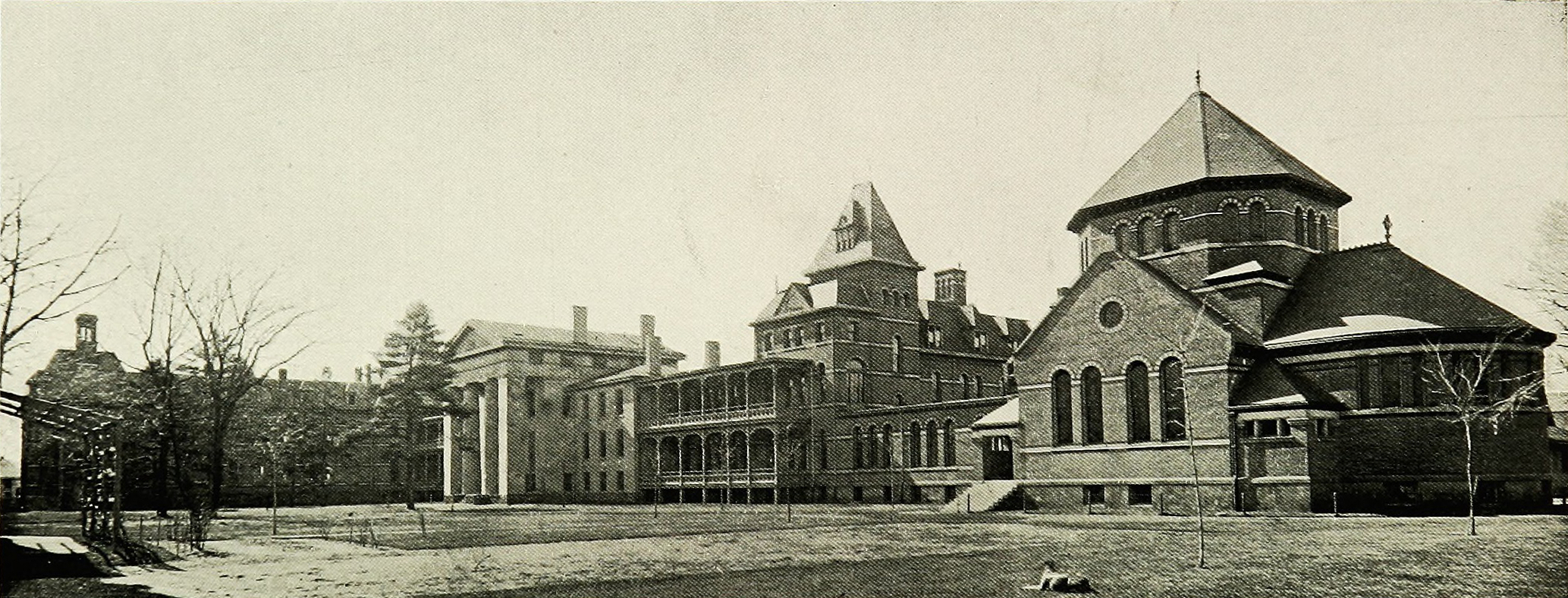
New Haven Hospital, about 1911

The history of Yale New Haven Hospital began in 1826 when the General Hospital Society of Connecticut was chartered as the first hospital in Connecticut and the fourth voluntary hospital in the nation. The hospital rented temporary quarters and raised US$5,000 toward the purchase of land and construction. A new 13-bed hospital opened in 1833 on seven and a half acres of land bordered by Cedar Street and Howard, Davenport, and Congress avenues. The original building, called the State Hospital, was designed by prominent New Haven architect Ithiel Town and cost US$13,000. In 1862, the State Hospital was converted to a military hospital to care for Union soldiers during the American Civil War. The hospital was renamed to the Knight United States Army General Hospital in honor of Jonathan Knight, the president of the board of trustees. Some attending physicians moved with the civilian patients to temporary quarters on Whitney Avenue. After the Civil War, the hospital was turned over to the General Society of Connecticut in 1865. The hospital converted back to its original name of State Hospital. The Connecticut Training School, the third training school for nurses in the United States, was opened by the hospital in 1873. In 1884, the hospital's name was changed to New Haven Hospital to reflect the name that was widely being used by the residents of New Haven.

Yale School of Medicine and New Haven Hospital formalized their relationship in 1913. U.S. medical education, which had begun as a simple apprenticeship system, evolved to become a formal educational plan based on alliances between medical schools and hospitals. This was the start of what is now known as the Yale New Haven Medical Center. Their first motorized ambulance was purchased by New Haven Hospital in 1914.

In 1945, the hospital changed its name to Grace-New Haven Hospital after it affiliated itself with nearby Grace Hospital. On July 6, 1946, U.S. president George W. Bush was born at the hospital. In 1951, the New Haven Dispensary formally merged with Grace-New Haven Hospital. The New Haven Dispensary had opened in 1871 as the city's first outpatient clinic. In 1965, a more formal agreement with the Yale School of Medicine resulted in another name change to Yale–New Haven Hospital. 1993 saw the opening of the Yale New Haven Children's Hospital becoming the first full-service children's hospital in Connecticut, including the first children's emergency department. The Yale New Haven Psychiatric Hospital was opened in 2000, after the purchase of the Yale Psychiatric Institute.

In 2003, a scandal over the hospital's treatment of poor patients severely tarnished its image. In March 2003, The Wall Street Journal reported on the case of Quinton White, a retiree, whom the hospital had sued. It had seized his bank account and put a lien on his house because White was in arrears in paying off his late wife's cancer treatment. Subsequent reporting indicated that the hospital had a practice of aggressively suing poor patients despite its status as a tax-exempt charitable organization. Public protests ensued, and state attorney general Richard Blumenthal sued the hospital for keeping money that was intended to help poor patients.

In response, the hospital forgave the debt of tens of thousands of patients, replaced its executives, and changed its billing practices. It also established community outreach programs that helped YNHH win the 2017 American Hospital Association's Foster G. McGaw Prize for Excellence in Community Service.

On September 12, 2012, YNHH acquired the assets of the Hospital of Saint Raphael (HSR), making it a single hospital with two main campuses 6 blocks apart.

== Facilities ==
The main patient campus of Yale New Haven Hospital comprises four inpatient pavilions bounded by South Frontage Road, Park Street, Howard Avenue, and York Street. The East Pavilion, originally called the Memorial Unit, was opened in 1952 (designed by Douglas Orr). Originally 8 stories tall, it was expanded to ten floors in 1972. The South Pavilion was opened in 1982 and followed by the Yale New Haven Children's Hospital (West Pavilion) in 1993. In 2009, YNHH saw the opening of the Smilow Cancer Hospital (North Pavilion). All four pavilions are connected by a central atrium. In 2000, Yale New Haven Hospital acquired the nearby Yale Psychiatric Institute (designed by architect Frank Gehry in 1989) and opened Yale New Haven Psychiatric Hospital. In 2004, the Yale New Haven Shoreline Medical Center in Guilford, Connecticut, was opened. The New Haven Pavilion houses outpatient clinics, clinical laboratories, and administration, among other departments. Located across the street from the inpatient pavilions, it occupies land that the original hospital was built on in 1833. The New Haven Pavilion connects directly to facilities of the Yale School of Medicine. In 2012, Yale New Haven Hospital acquired the assets of Hospital of Saint Raphael, located on Chapel Street in New Haven, which established Yale New Haven Hospital Saint Raphael Campus.

=== Smilow Cancer Hospital at Yale New Haven ===
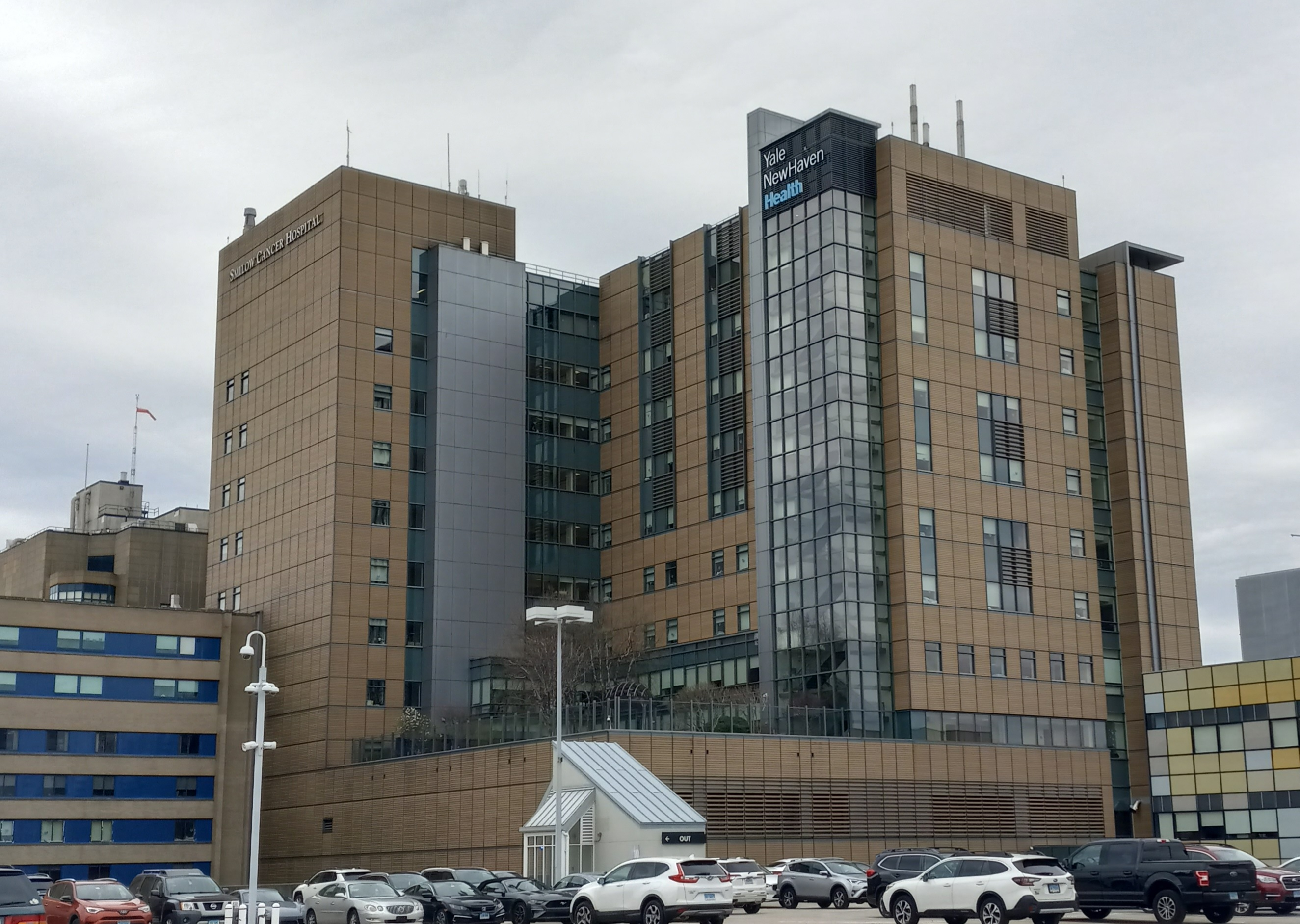
Smilow Cancer Hospital in New Haven

In October 2009, Yale New Haven Hospital opened the 14-story Smilow Cancer Hospital at Yale New Haven. Smilow Cancer Hospital is affiliated with Yale Cancer Center, southern New England's only designated Comprehensive Cancer Center and one of 41 such centers in the United States. Smilow Cancer Hospital integrates all oncology patient services at the Hospital and Yale School of Medicine in one building specifically designed for the delivery of cancer care.

While construction was scheduled to begin in September 2005, the project was delayed by disputes with unions and the city. On March 22, 2006, the unions and the hospital reached an agreement. Construction on the new Yale–New Haven Cancer Hospital started on May 18, 2006, with the demolition of the Grace Building and site preparation. Groundbreaking occurred on Wednesday, September 6, 2006.

The Cancer Center building was named Smilow Cancer Hospital in honor of Joel E. and Joan Smilow's large gift to the cancer hospital. Joel E. Smilow is an alumnus of Yale University class of '54 and the former chair, chief executive officer, and president of Playtex Products Inc. Smilow Cancer Hospital is connected to the other facilities via the atrium.

The project includes an adjacent six-story building at 55 Park Street. The building was designed by Barry Svigals of Svigals + Partners and Behnisch Architekten. The 55 Park building houses a large atrium connecting the main parking garage with the Smilow Cancer Hospital as well as clinical laboratories, the main hospital pharmacy, and other support functions for the hospital. The City of New Haven approved 55 Park on November 15, 2007.

=== Hospital of Saint Raphael ===
Acquired on September 12, 2012 the Yale-New Haven Hospital Saint Raphael Campus sits just 6 blocks apart from the main campus. It includes 511 beds and serves as an expansion to the services of Yale-New Haven Hospital. The campus will soon be home to the Adams Neuroscience Center.

==== Adams Neuroscience Center ====
Currently under construction and set to be open in 2027, the Adams Neuroscience Center will be a new 505,000 sq. foot complex of two towers with 204 in-patient beds. The complex will specialize in treating movement and neuro-degenerative disorders as well as strokes. In addition the project will allow for the decant of much of the existing East Pavilion built in 1953 and currently housing 300+ patient beds.

== Notable people ==
=== Births ===
- George W. Bush (1946) – 43rd President of the United States
- Richard Carpenter (1946) – singer and member of the musical sibling duo the Carpenters
- Karen Carpenter (1950–1983) – singer and member of the musical sibling duo the Carpenters

=== Faculty ===
- Lisa Sanders – attending physician at YNHH

== See also ==
- SkyHealth (air ambulance service jointly owned by Yale New Haven Health System and Northwell Health)
- List of former United States Army medical units
- List of the oldest hospitals in the United States
- List of tallest buildings in New Haven
