= Pearl Jam Twenty =

2011 film by Cameron Crowe

- Directed by: Cameron Crowe
- Written by: Cameron Crowe
- Produced by: Michele Anthony; Cameron Crowe; Morgan Neville
- Cinematography: Nicola B. Marsh
- Release dates: September 10, 2011 (TIFF); September 20, 2011 (US)
- Running time: 120 minutes
- Country: United States
- Language: English

Pearl Jam Twenty (also known as PJ20) is a 2011 American documentary directed by Cameron Crowe about the band Pearl Jam. Preliminary footage was being shot as of June 2010. Crowe completed filming in April 2011, after using 12,000 hours of footage of the band for the documentary. The film premiered at the 2011 Toronto International Film Festival and also had an accompanying book and soundtrack.

The documentary charts the history of the band, from the demise of Mother Love Bone, their battle against Ticketmaster and the tragedy of the Roskilde Festival in 2000.

The film was presented theatrically at select cinemas in the US during the month of September 2011, and premiered on October 21, 2011, on PBS' American Masters. It was released on DVD and Blu-ray on October 24, 2011. A book, written by Jonathan Cohen, was published concurrent to the film's release.

== Cast ==
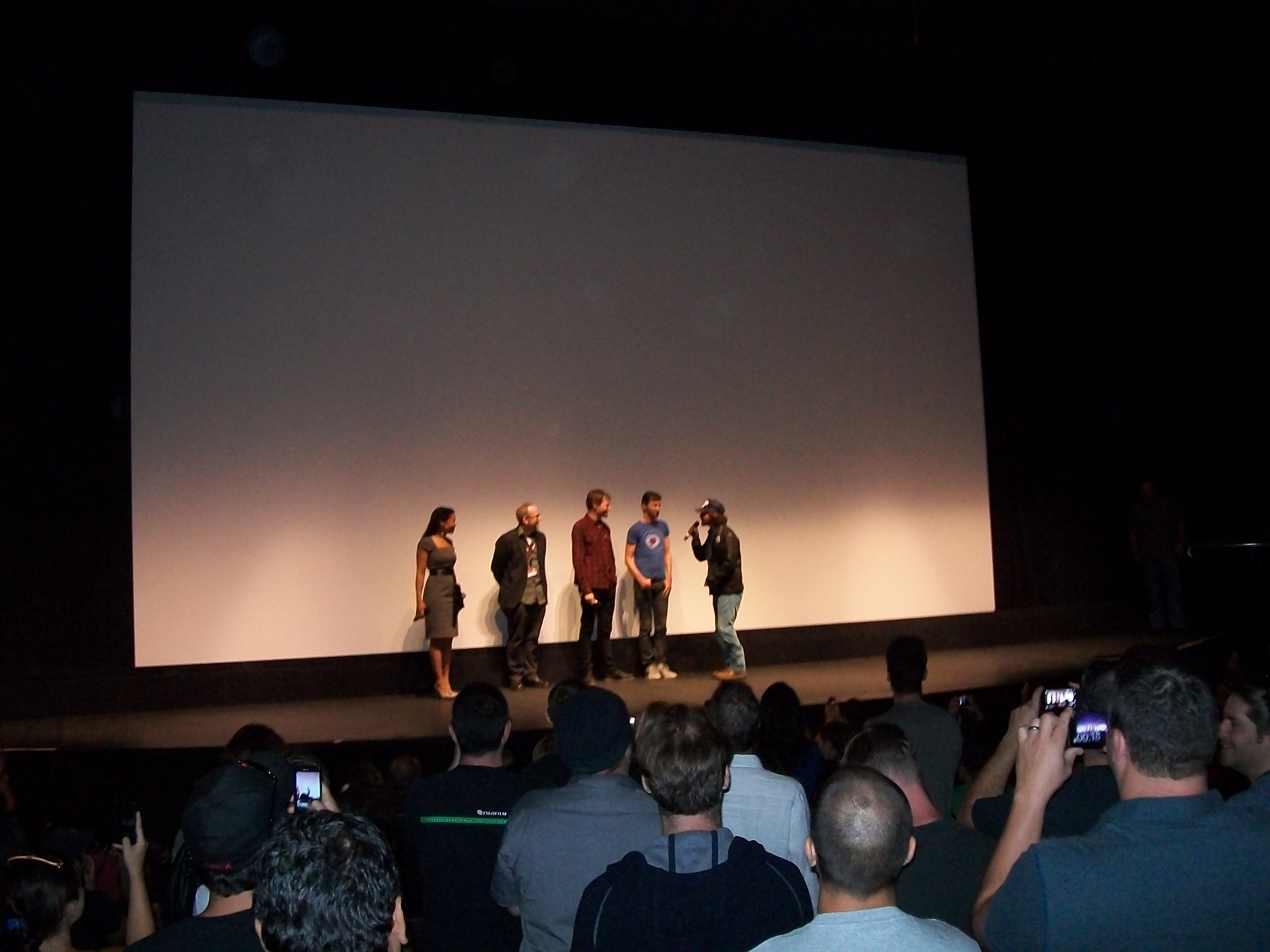
Q&A session after the second screening of Pearl Jam Twenty at the 2011 Toronto International Film Festival with the band's frontman Eddie Vedder (far right)

- Eddie Vedder
- Stone Gossard
- Jeff Ament
- Mike McCready
- Matt Cameron
- Chris Cornell
- Kurt Cobain
- Neil Young

== Soundtrack ==
The film soundtrack includes live recordings from 1990 through 2010.

== Charts ==
Chart (2011)	Peak position
Australian Music DVDs Chart	1
Austrian Music DVDs Chart	4
Belgian (Flanders) Music DVDs Chart	3
Belgian (Wallonia) Music DVDs Chart	4
Danish Music DVDs Chart	3
Dutch Music DVDs Chart	2
Finnish Music DVDs Chart	2
Hungarian DVDs Chart	6
Irish Music DVDs Chart	1
Norwegian Music DVDs Chart	1
Portuguese Music DVDs Chart	2
Spanish Music DVDs Chart	2
Swedish Music DVDs Chart	1
Swiss Music DVDs Chart	4
UK Music Videos Chart	3

== Certifications ==
Region	Certification	Certified units/sales
Australia (ARIA)	Platinum	15,000^{^}
Portugal (AFP)	Gold	4,000^{^}
United States (RIAA)	Platinum	100,000^{^}
^{^} Shipments figures based on certification alone.
