= Renmin Hospital of Wuhan University =

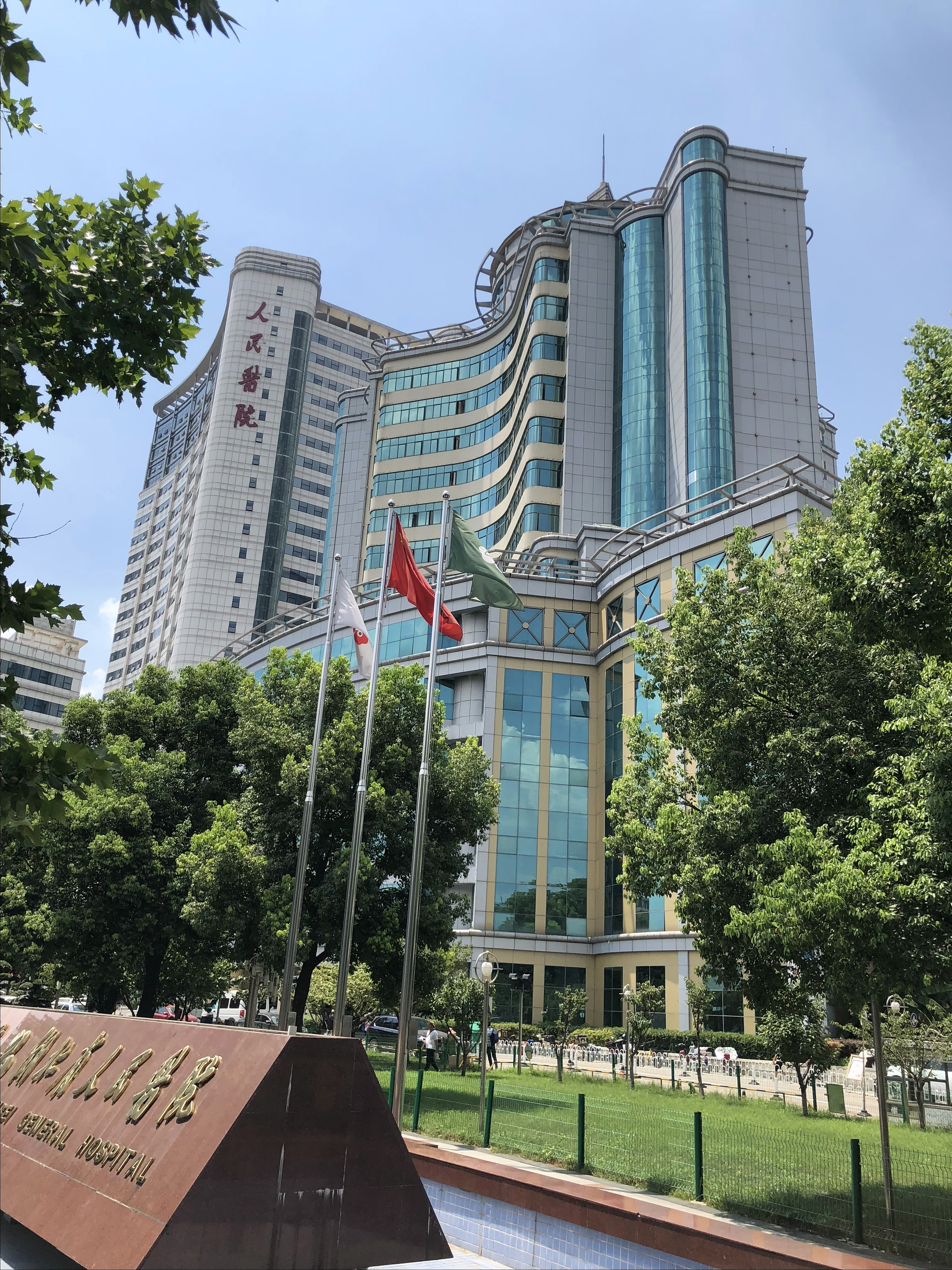
- Taikang Building (泰康楼, Emergency Department)

Geography
- Location: Wuchang District, Wuhan City, Hubei Province, China, China
- Coordinates: 30°32′17″N 114°17′38″E

Organisation
- Affiliated university: Wuhan University

History
- Founded: 1923

Links
- Website: www.rmhospital.com

The Renmin Hospital of Wuhan University (武汉大学人民医院), also known as the Hubei General Hospital (湖北省人民医院), is a public hospital in Wuhan, Hubei, China. It is a teaching hospital of the Wuhan University School of Medicine

Founded in 1923 as one of the first government-run public hospitals in the country, it is now a large Grade A tertiary hospital of 5,000 beds, integrating medical treatment, teaching, and research.

== History ==
In 1923, the teaching hospital of Hubei Provincial Medical University was established. It was the first government-run public hospital in Hubei Province.

In October 1926, the hospital merged into National Wuchang Zhongshan University. Later renamed Hubei Provincial Wuchang Hospital.

In 1938, due to Japanese air raids, the hospital relocate to Enshi, Hubei. And based on the hospital, the Hubei Province-run Medical College was founded.

In February 1946, the medical college and the hospital moved back to Wuchang.

In November 1949, Hubei Province-run Medical College was renamed "Hubei Provincial Medical College". Hubei Provincial Hospital, the Affiliated Hospital of Hubei Provincial Medical College, Hubei Provincial Infectious Disease Hospital, Hubei Provincial Tuberculosis Hospital, and Wuchang Women and Children's Hospital were merged to form "Hubei Provincial General Hospital".

In 1954, Hubei Provincial General Hospital was renamed the "First Affiliated Hospital of Hubei Medical College".

In January 1994, Hubei Medical College was renamed "Hubei Medical University", and the hospital was renamed the "First Affiliated Hospital of Hubei Medical University". In the same year, the hospital was rated as one of the first batch of Grade A tertiary hospitals in Hubei Province by the Ministry of Health of China.

In 2000, Hubei Medical University merged into Wuhan University, and the hospital was renamed "Renmin Hospital of Wuhan University", while continuing to use the name "Hubei Provincial General Hospital".

In 2013, the East Campus (or Guanggu Campus) was opened.

In 2020, Renmin Hospital of Wuhan University ranked 11th in the comprehensive ranking of Chinese hospitals' influence and 3rd in scientific and technological output among hospitals nationwide.

In 2024, Hongshan Campus of Renmin Hospital of Wuhan University opens, with a total construction area of 276,800 square meters, and 1,000 beds. In the same year, the hospital successfully launched the world's first medical remote sensing satellite, the "Renmin Hospital of Wuhan University Health Satellite".

In 2025, Renmin Hospital of Wuhan University was approved to establish a national regional medical center for mental illness. This is the first clinical national regional medical center in Hubei Province.

== Current status ==
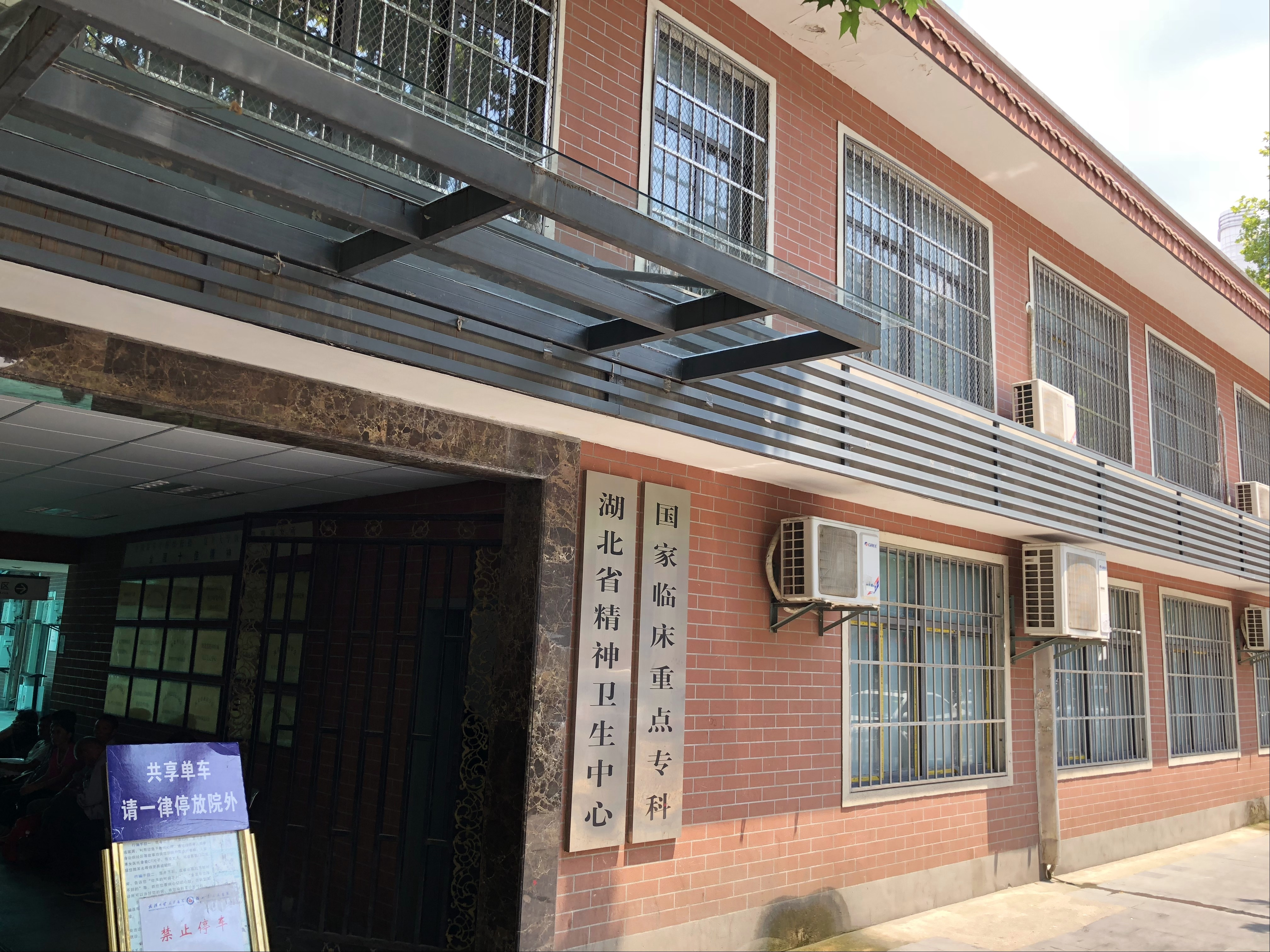
Mental Health Center

The Renmin Hospital of Wuhan University has the campuses of Shouyi, Guanggu, and Hongshan, with over 7000 staff members, 100 clinical departments, 5,000 beds, and complete advanced medical equipments.

In 2025, the hospital served 4.5 million outpatient and emergency patients, treated nearly 300,000 inpatients, and perform over 130,000 surgeries.

The hospital is Central China's heart care leader. It is also strong at minimally invasive therapy, organ transplantation, reproductive medicine, psychosomatic medicine, and smart healthcare.

As the First Clinical College of Wuhan University, the hospital serves as a clinical teaching and internship base for the Wuhan University School of Medicine. Each year, the hospital trains more than 800 undergraduate medical students, 1,200 doctoral and master's candidates, 1,400 resident physicians. It also houses a postdoctoral research station in clinical medicine.

In academic research, Renmin Hospital of Wuhan University ranks 15th nationally for SCI publications. It published 84 papers listed in Nature Index for the Time frame of 1 April 2025 - 31 March 2026, ranking 136th globally and 56th in China in healthcare.

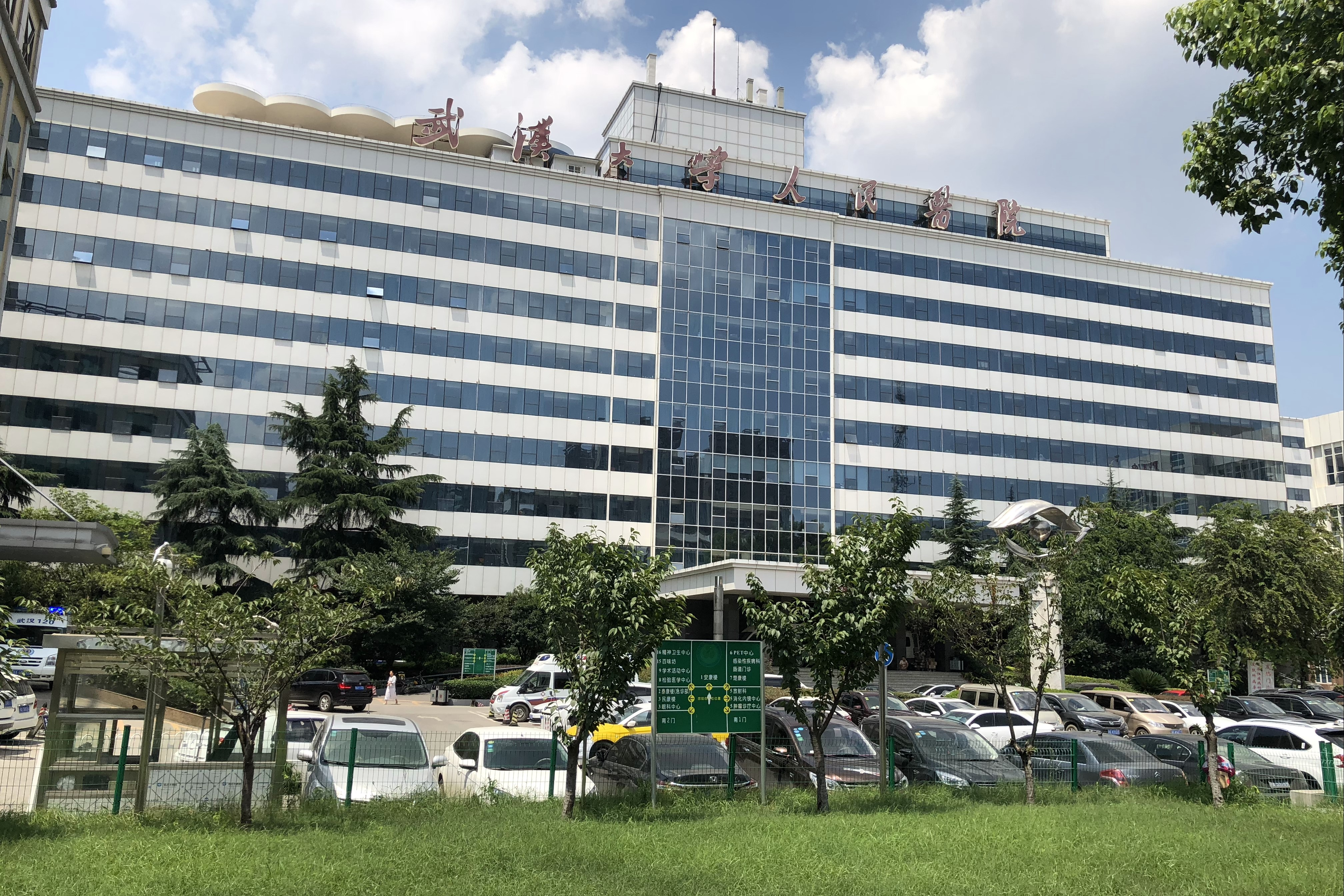
Ankang Building (安康楼)

Main campus Address: 99 Zhangzhidong Road, Wuchang district, Wuhan, Hubei province, China.

== See also ==
- Wuhan University
- Wuhan University School of Medicine
- List of hospitals in China
