= Wang Xinghuan =

Chinese physician (born 1965)

- 王行环

President of the Zhongnan Hospital of Wuhan University
- In office 2015 – December 2025

President of the Leishenshan Hospital
- In office February 2020 – April 2020

Personal details
- Born: August 1965 (age 61) Wuhan, Hubei, China
- Party: Chinese Communist Party (expelled in 2026); Chinese Peasants' and Workers' Democratic Party
- Education: Hubei Medical College (now a part of Wuhan University); Beijing Medical University

Wang Xinghuan (Chinese: 王行环; born August 1965) is a Chinese physician, who served as the president of the Zhongnan Hospital of Wuhan University from 2015 to 2025. He was a member of the 14th National Committee of the Chinese People's Political Consultative Conference.

== Career ==
Wang was born in August 1965. In 1981, he was enrolled to Hubei Medical College, and earned the bachelor of medicine in 1986 and the surgery master's degree in 1989. He also enrolled to Beijing Medical University in 1993 and earned the urology PhD.

Wang was served as the physician of the Second Affiliated Hospital of Hubei Medical College in 1983. In 1996, he served as the physician of Guangdong General Hospital urology department until 2008. He was returned to Zhongnan Hospital in 2008, and he was appointed the president in 2015.

During the COVID-19 pandemic in Wuhan, Wang was appointed as the president of Leishenshan Hospital, an emergency specialty field hospital in February 2020. He was stepped down the post in April.

== Investigation ==
On 29 December 2025, Wang was put under investigation for alleged "serious violations of discipline and laws" by the Hubei Commission for Discipline Inspection, and the Hubei Supervisory Commission. Prior to investigation, Wang was removed from the member of the 14th National Committee of the Chinese People's Political Consultative Conference post on 24 December. Wang was expelled from the Communist Party and dismissed from the public offices on 18 April 2026.
