= Xiaotangshan =

Xiaotangshan may refer to:

- Xiaotangshan Han Shrine, Shandong, China
- Xiaotangshan, Beijing, China
- Xiaotangshan Hospital
