= Fangcang hospital =

Temporary hospital in China

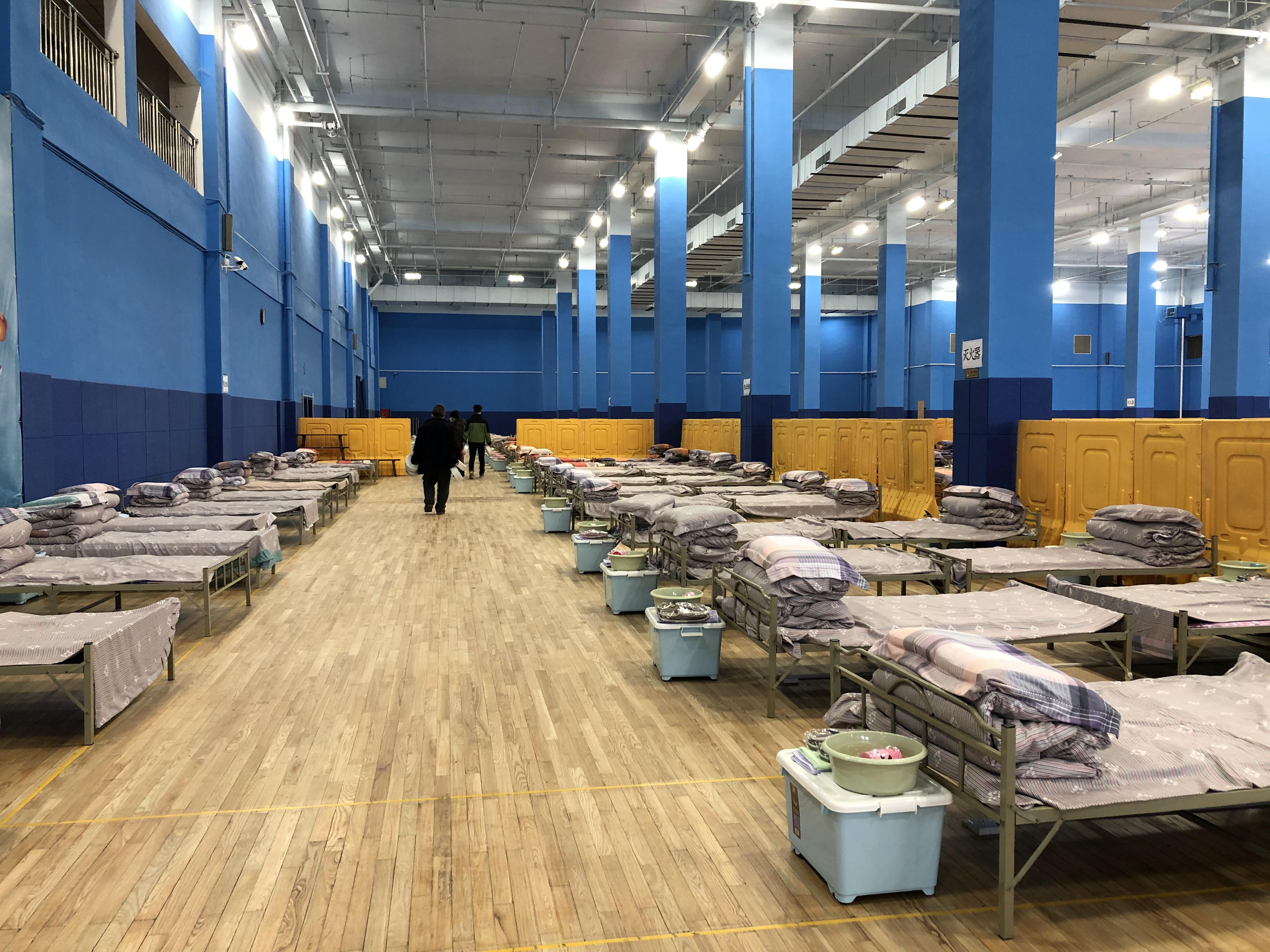
- A fangcang hospital in Wuhan in February 2020

Geography
- Location: China

Organisation
- Type: Makeshift hospital

Links
- Lists: Hospitals in China

Fangcang hospital (Chinese: 方舱医院; pinyin: fāngcāng yīyuàn; lit. 'square-cabin hospital') refers to a kind of makeshift/mobile field hospitals used during the COVID-19 pandemic in China.

== History and usage ==
Fancang hospitals are temporary hospitals converted from public venues like stadiums in order to provide large scale medical isolation and health care for patients with mild to moderate symptoms of an infectious disease.

Chinese literature has mentioned the concept of "medical Fangcang" as early as 1989. China has constructed fangcang hospitals during the 2008 Sichuan earthquake and 2010 Yushu earthquake.

=== COVID-19 pandemic ===
In Wuhan, at the onset of the COVID-19 pandemic in January 2020, general medical institutions and the newly expanded pneumonia specialist hospital were overwhelmed by the sudden surge in hospital bed demands by suspected COVID-19 cases. Many patients with existing conditions were also turned away, leading to deaths which were otherwise preventable. Authorities were criticized by experts and citizens alike. Meanwhile, the large number of low-severity cases — almost all are individuals with suspected or mild symptoms — still needed at least a fortnight of isolation (due to the incubation period of SARS-CoV-2).

Officials decided against home isolation for mild to moderate cases, as home isolation is not always properly complied with and it was difficult to organize medical care and monitoring for those in isolation. Furthermore, home isolation could be psychologically taxing on the patients as the patients know that they are putting their family members at risk of infection. On the other hand, in-hospital isolation will hold up medical resources and increase the risk of nosocomial exposure. Under such circumstances, the principle of centralized low-level care management of non-critical patients was adopted. The Government of the People's Republic of China established 16 fangcang hospitals in Wuhan, providing a total of more than 20,000 beds.

As of March 10, 2020, all patients admitted to the square cabin hospital of Wuhan Wushan Hongshan Stadium were discharged. Thus, all 16 fangcang hospitals in Wuhan completed their missions and their cabins were shut down.

== Etymology ==
Fangcang (simplified Chinese: 方舱; traditional Chinese: 方艙; pinyin: fāngcāng), literally meaning "square cabin", is a Chinese term referring to a portable modular building structure formed using a combination of various solid materials, most notably cargotectures. The concept of "Fangcang" was borrowed from military field hospitals, which was initially introduced by the United States military, who has been making makeshift structures since the 1950s.

Outside of the context of the outbreak, makeshift or Fangcang structures can refer to many kinds of modular structures.

== Locations in Wuhan ==
The sixteen Fangcang Hospitals in Wuhan

The following Fangcang hospitals were in use in Wuhan during the COVID-19 pandemic:

- Wuhan International Conference & Exhibition Center, Jianghan District
- Hongshan Stadium, Wuchang District
- Wuhan Living Room, Dongxihu District
- Wuhan National Fitness Center, Jiang'an District
- Hongqiao Industrial Park, Jing'an District
- Wuhan Stadium, Qiaokou District
- Wuhan International Expo Center, Hanyang District
- Wuhan Sports Center Stadium, Wuhan Development Zone
- Shipailing Senior Vocational High School, Hongshan District
- Optics Valley Convention & Exhibition Center, Donghu Development Zone
- Wuhan Meilian Group's former Rihai Industrial Park plant, Hongshan District
- Dahua Mountain Outdoor Sports Center, Jiangxia District
- Huangpi Stadium, Huangpi District
- WISCO Sports Center, Qingshan District
- Yangtze River Media Zhiyin Practice Training Base, Caidian District

== Outside Mainland China ==
The first comparable makeshift hospital built during Russia's outbreak was built at Golokhvastovo in suburban Moscow in March 2020. Similar makeshift hospitals were successively built in countries including Iran, Spain, United Kingdom and the United States.

In Singapore, isolation facilities which were repurposed existing large-scale facilities, like the Singapore Expo, are partially modelled after the Fangcang hospital design.

== See also ==
- Huoshenshan Hospital
- Leishenshan Hospital
- Dabie Mountain Regional Medical Centre
- COVID-19 hospitals in the United Kingdom
