= Zhongnan Hospital of Wuhan University =

Zhongnan Hospital of Wuhan University (Chinese: 武汉大学中南医院)
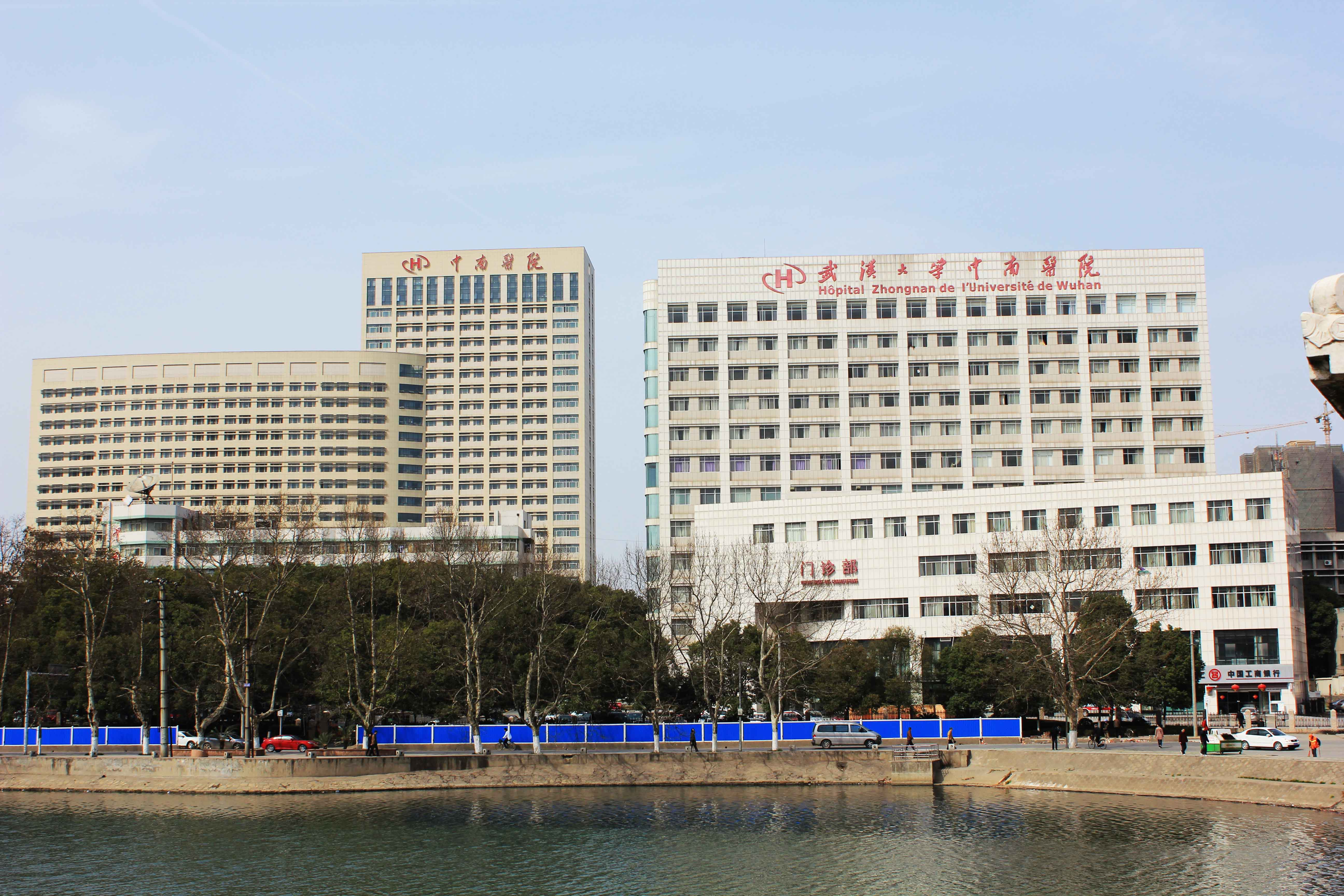
- Zhongnan Hospital of Wuhan University

Geography
- Location: No. 169, Donghu Road, Wuchang District, Wuhan City, Hubei Province, China

Organisation
- Type: Public, general, teaching
- Affiliated university: Wuhan University

Services
- Beds: 3,000+

History
- Founded: 1956

Links
- Website: https://www.znhospital.com/index.html
- Lists: Hospitals in China

The Zhongnan Hospital of Wuhan University, shortly "Zhongnan Hospital", also known as the "Second Affiliated Hospital of Wuhan University", is a Grade A tertiary hospitals in Wuhan, capital city of Hubei Province of China. Founded in 1956, Zhongnan Hospital is now a national top-60 comprehensive hospital integrating medical treatment, teaching, and scientific research.

== History ==
In November 1956, the Zhongnan Cadre Sanatorium was transferred to Hubei Medical College and renamed the "Second Affiliated Hospital of Hubei Medical College".

In January 1993, Hubei Medical College was renamed "Hubei Medical University", and the hospital was renamed the "Second Affiliated Hospital of Hubei Medical University" and "Second Clinical College of Hubei Medical University". In the same year, the hospital was rated as one of the first batch of Grade A tertiary hospitals in Hubei Province by the Ministry of Health of China.

In 1995, the hospital was jointly awarded the title of "Baby-Friendly Hospital" by UNICEF, the World Health Organization, and the Ministry of Health of China.

On August 2, 2000, Hubei Medical University merged with Wuhan University, Wuhan University of Hydraulic and Electric Engineering, and Wuhan University of Surveying and Mapping Science and Technology to form the new Wuhan University. And the hospital was renamed "Zhongnan Hospital of Wuhan University" and the "Second Affiliated Hospital of Wuhan University".

In 2023, Zhongnan Hospital published the first Nature journal paper of the province.

In 2020, the Wuhan Infectious Diseases and Cancer Research Center of the Chinese Academy of Medical Sciences was established at Zhongnan Hospital.

In 2026, the Optics Valley Campus of Zhongnan Hospital was opened.

== Current Situation ==
Currently, Zhongnan Hospital of Wuhan University has 46 clinical departments and 3,300 beds, serving more than 3 million outpatient visits annually.

The hospital's stronger disciplines include its national key clinical specialties of oncology, urinary surgery, critical care medicine and clinical care; and the provincial key specialties of internal medicine, oncology, surgery and clinical examination and diagnosis.

In education, Zhongnan Hospital trains doctoral, master and undergraduate students, including students from Hong Kong, Macao and Taiwan. It is the "Physician Qualification Examination and Examiner Training Base of the National Medical Examination Center" and the "National Standardized Residency Training Base".

In scientific research, Zhongnan Hospital totally published 169 papers listed in Nature Index for the time period of 1 July 2025 - 30 June 2026, among which 100 were in Health Sciences, ranking 27th globally and 5th in China in healthcare.

In the 2024 China Hospital and Specialty Reputation Ranking, the Zhongnan Hospital ranked A++ (top-60) in the comprehensive hospital ranking and 9th in Critical Care Medicine nationwide.

Zhongnan Hospital of Wuhan University has academic exchanges and relations with medical institutions in France, the United Kingdom, Germany, the United States, Canada, Australia, Japan, Hong Kong, Macao and Taiwan. Such as the University of Chicago, Université de Lorrain, Fukushima Medical University and Vaasa University of Applied Science.

Zhongnan Hospital of Wuhan University is located at No. 169 Donghu Road, Wuchang District, Wuhan City, Hubei Province.

== Friendship with France ==
After the establishment of the French Consulate General in Wuhan in October 1998, Zhongnan Hospital of Wuhan University was jointly designated by the French Embassy in China and the Consulate General in Wuhan as the only French-speaking hospital in Wuhan and recommended to French citizens in China. Therefore, the hospital signage is in both Chinese and French.

On October 27, 2006, French President Jacques Chirac and his wife, who were on a state visit to China, along with a government delegation consisting of about 200 people, visited Zhongnan Hospital of Wuhan University. He cut the ribbon for the completion of the Emergency Center of Zhongnan Hospital of Wuhan University and laid the foundation stone for the Sino-French Institute of Hepatobiliary Diseases of Wuhan University, a national-level cooperation project between China and France in the medical field. In his speech, President Chirac said that the cooperation between China and France in culture and science and technology was very important, and that we should pay tribute to the exemplary medical and educational cooperation between China and France at Wuhan University.

Zhongnan Hospital also has academic communication and cooperation with Université de Lyon and Paul Sabatier University in France.

== See also ==
- Wuhan University
- Wuhan University School of Medicine
- List of hospitals in China
