= Xiaotangshan Hospital =

Beijing Xiaotangshan Hospital
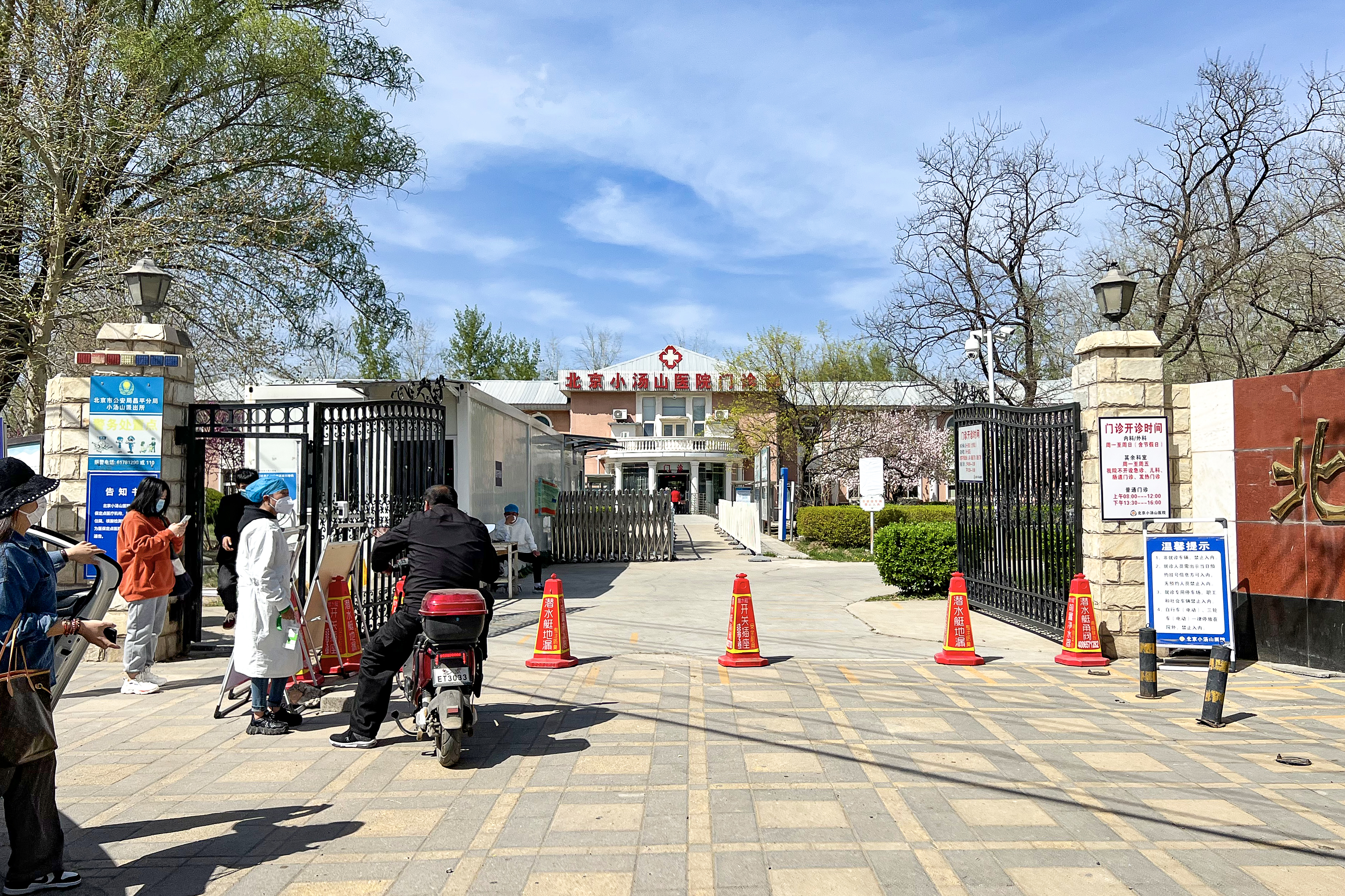
- Outpatient department

- Location within China

Geography
- Location: Xiaotangshan, Changping, Beijing; China
- Coordinates: 40.180034°N 116.3914444°E

Organisation
- Type: General hospital

Services
- Standards: Tertiary hospital
- Emergency department: Yes
- Beds: 577

History
- Founded: 1958

The Beijing Xiaotangshan Recovery Hospital (Chinese: 北京市小汤山康复医院; pinyin: Běijīngshì Xiǎotāngshān Kāngfù Yīyuàn), also known as the Beijing Xiaotangshan Hospital, is a tertiary-level general hospital in Xiaotangshan Township, Changping District, Beijing, China, occupying approximately 33 hectares (82 acres) of land.

Xiaotangshan (Chinese: 小汤山; pinyin: Xiǎotāngshān; "Little Waters Mountain") is a mountain named after the hot springs found on it. The Xiaotangshan Recovery Hospital's predecessor, the Beijing Xiaotangshan Hospital, was established in 1958; it was given its current name in 1985. During the 2003 SARS outbreak, the Ministry of Health of the People's Republic of China and the Beijing municipal government made use of land set apart for the hospital's future development to establish a separate hospital to treat SARS, the Xiaotangshan SARS Hospital. This temporary hospital was removed in 2010. On January 21, 2020, due to the COVID-19 pandemic, the city of Beijing commenced work to reconstruct and renovate the hospital to support disease control efforts.

== History ==
A China News Service journalist visits the Xiaotangshan Hospital

Following the establishment of the People's Republic of China, the Chinese Ministry of Health established the Xiaotangshan Ministry of Health Sanatorium, a national-level hot spring sanatorium.

In 1958, the Ministry of Health's Xiaotangshan Sanatorium joined together with the People's Liberation Army's 123rd Sanatorium and 107th Huabei Military Area Sanatorium, as well as the All-China Federation of Trade Unions's Xiaotangshan Hot Springs Sanatorium to form the Beijing Xiaotangshan Sanatorium, operated by the People's Liberation Army General Logistics Department as a sanatorium for the rehabilitation and recovery of patients.

In 1982, the complex was renamed to the Beijing Recovery Center and management was transferred to the Beijing Municipal Health Bureau. In 1988, signage was added to indicate that the complex was also the Beijing Xiaotangshan Hospital.

== Facilities ==
Today, the Beijing Xiaotangshan Hospital focuses on physical medicine and rehabilitation, with a specialization in nervous system damage, bone and joint illness, and the clinical treatment and rehabilitation of chronic diseases. The hospital features hot spring facilities used in treatment and rehabilitation. The Beijing hospital system mainly sends patients in a subacute or recovery stage to the Xiaotangshan Hospital for rehabilitative treatment.

On May 14, 2019, the Beijing Xiaotangshan Hospital officially became a center for functional medicine with the goal of conducting experimentation and research in functional medicine.

== Xiaotangshan SARS Hospital ==
People's Liberation Army Xiaotangshan SARS Hospital
- Location within China

Geography
- Coordinates: 40.180034°N 116.3914444°E

Organisation
- Type: Infectious disease hospital

Services
- Standards: Tertiary hospital
- Emergency department: Yes
- Beds: 1000

History
- Founded: 2003; 2020 (reconstruction)
- Closed: 2010

=== History ===
At the most severe point of the 2003 SARS epidemic, Beijing's major hospitals faced overcrowding and a lack of available beds. On April 22, experts from the Chinese Center for Disease Control and Prevention recommended that, due to the lack of available beds at hospitals, Sanatoriums – especially the relatively well-equipped Xiaotangshan Sanatorium – could be repurposed for the treatment of SARS patients. Following this, the Chinese Center for Disease Control and Prevention's Deputy Minister, Zhu Qingsheng, and the Beijing Deputy Mayor, Liu Jingmin, inspected the Xiaotangshan grounds and concluded that it was a suitable site for the construction of a new hospital; although the sanatorium itself only had 200 beds, it had retained large swaths of land for future development, and its surrounding land was open and easy for construction machinery to operate on. In addition, with the Jingmi Diversion Channel just four kilometres (2.5 miles) north of the sanatorium, wastewater could receive specialized processing without affecting Beijing's water supply.

On April 22, the State Council of the People's Republic of China approved funding for the purchase of 40.3 hectares (100 acres) of land from the Xiaotangshan area to construct the world's largest field hospital for infectious diseases. All SARS patients in Beijing hospitals were to receive centralized treatment at this hospital. The construction operations were to be directed by the Chinese Center for Disease Control and the municipal government of Beijing. On February 22, the Beijing Construction Commission dispatched about 4,000 workers and about 500 pieces of construction equipment, and all six large construction groups in Beijing went on to the construction area. On April 23, construction of the new hospital began. On April 29, the hospital was completed and passed inspections. On April 30, the Center for Disease Control and Beijing's municipal government announced that the hospital was being handed over for use, and the hospital was named the Chinese People's Liberation Army Xiaotangshan SARS Hospital (also known as Beijing Xiaotangshan Hospital SARS Ward or Xiaotangshan SARS Hospital). The Xiaotangshan SARS Hospital was a primary-level infectious disease hospital and the world's largest infectious disease hospital, and its construction set a world record for the shortest time required to build a hospital.

On the night of May 1, 2003, the hospital began accepting SARS patients from across the country. The People's Liberation Army transferred 1200 military medical staff to the hospital to conduct treatment. The Xiaotangshan Hospital accepted 680 SARS patients in total (another source estimated 700), which was one-tenth of the worldwide cases and one-seventh of the cases in China.

In the end, 672 patients at the hospital successfully recovered. Out of the 1383 medical staff who participated in treatment and care at the hospital, none were infected. Early on the morning of June 23, 900 members of the medical staff became the first to be recalled from Beijing. On June 24, the World Health Organization announced that Beijing had been taken off of the list of active SARS epidemic zones.

=== Facilities ===
The Xiaotangshan SARS Hospital was constructed using lightweight materials and mainly consisted of a single storey. The hospital was divided into three areas: a tightly controlled area for patients, a buffer zone consisting of the living quarters of the medical staff, and a clean zone consisting of administrative and logistics offices. The personnel were segregated into these zones in order to avoid the spread of disease. The patient area itself was separated into the East and West wings that respectively treated confirmed and suspected cases. Each patient zone had six rows of rooms for patients. Rooms for X-ray imaging, CT imaging, and surgical operations were found on the south side, while the north side housed intensive care units, examination rooms, and clinical laboratories. Each patient room had approximately 15 square metres (160 square feet) of space. Rooms had standard equipment, included bathrooms, telephones, televisions, and air conditioning.

A wastewater treatment facility was constructed specifically for the hospital in order to avoid pollution of the surrounding environment. Other hospital waste was burned using specialized equipment.

=== After the SARS outbreak ===
After the end of the SARS epidemic, the hospital was abandoned as its facilities ceased to be necessary. Prior to its deconstruction in 2010, it was considered as a potential asset in the case of a future outbreak. In 2009, Zeng Guang, an epidemiologist at the Chinese Center for Disease Control, indicated that, should a mass-scale outbreak occur in Beijing, it could become useful for processing patients once other hospitals reached capacity. However, due to long-term abandonment, the hospital grounds had severely deteriorated and had become overgrown with weeds, earning it the moniker of "China's Silent Hill".

On April 2, 2010, the Beijing Municipal Health Bureau announced it was demolishing the Xiaotangshan Hospital's SARS wards. Also in April 2010, communications department personnel at the Beijing Municipal Health Bureau indicated that, strictly speaking, there was no "Xiaotangshan SARS Hospital", as it was not constructed as a hospital but rather a field treatment center.

=== Reconstruction during the Covid-19 pandemic ===
On January 29, 2020, to combat the COVID-19 pandemic, Beijing authorities decided to restore the Xiaotangshan SARS Hospital and dispatched workers to reconstruct it and restore the hospital's facilities.

Having originally been built in a week, the 2020 restoration took six weeks, and the hospital admitted its first COVID-19 patients on 16 March 2020. It continued in operation until 28 April and closed the next day.

== See also ==
- SARS
- Huoshenshan Hospital
- Leishenshan Hospital
