= Datangshan =

Datangshan (simplified Chinese: 大汤山; traditional Chinese: 大湯山; pinyin: Dàtāngshān) is a village and a hill in the Changping District of Beijing, China. It is one the villages under the administration of Xiaotangshan town. The hill was named Datangshan ("great hot spring hill") on account of the presence of hot springs in the area. The village, named after the hill, has existed since the Ming dynasty. The China Aviation Museum is located in Datangshan.

== Transportation ==
- N 6th Ring Road
- Beijing Metro Changping Line

== Attractions ==
It is the site of China's largest aviation museum, the China Aviation Museum.

- Jiuhua Resort and Convention Centre
- Xiaotangshan Hot Springs
