= Xiaotangshan, Beijing =

Xiaotangshan Town 小汤山镇
- Town
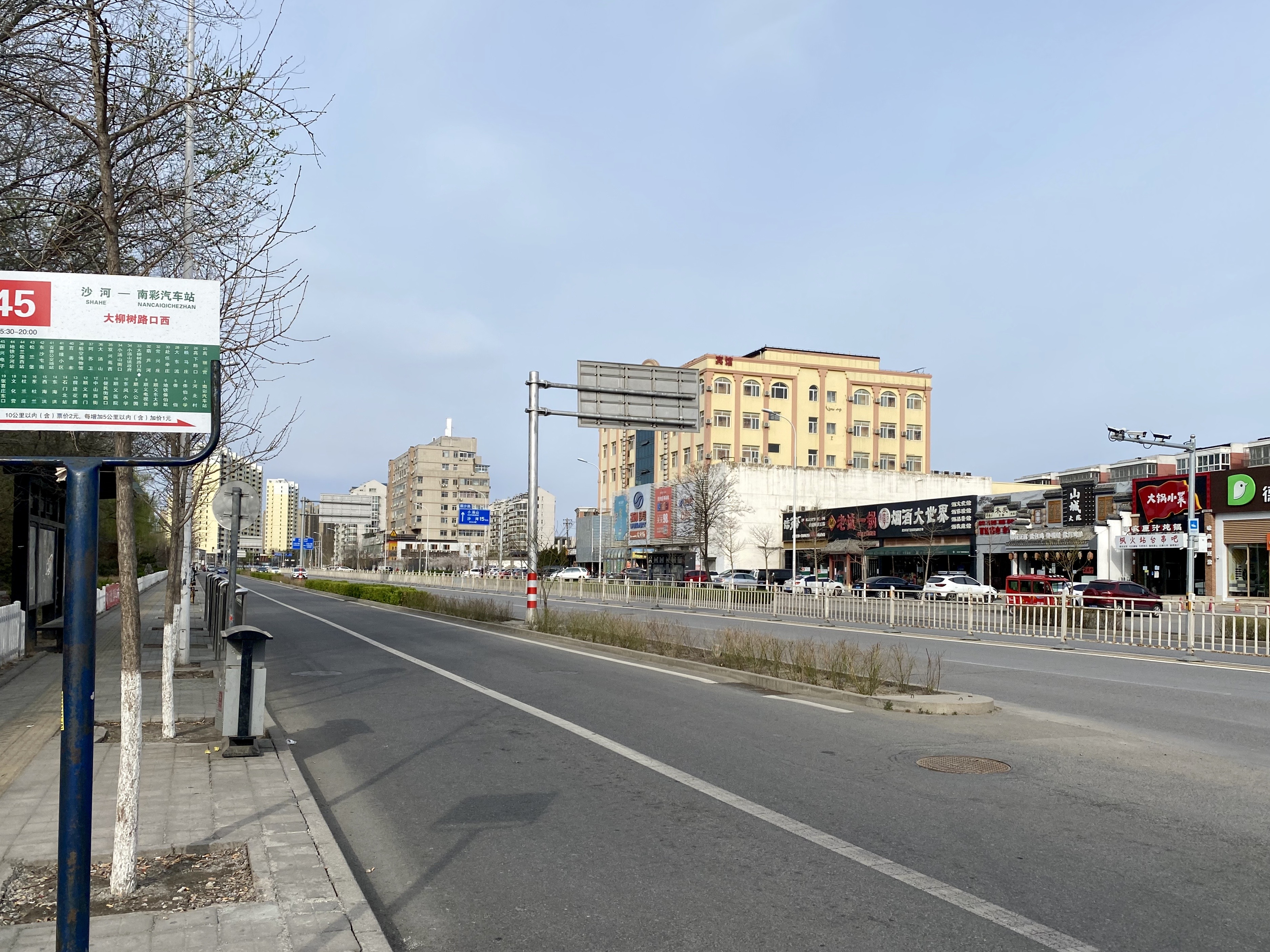
- Xiaotangshan as seen from Litang Road

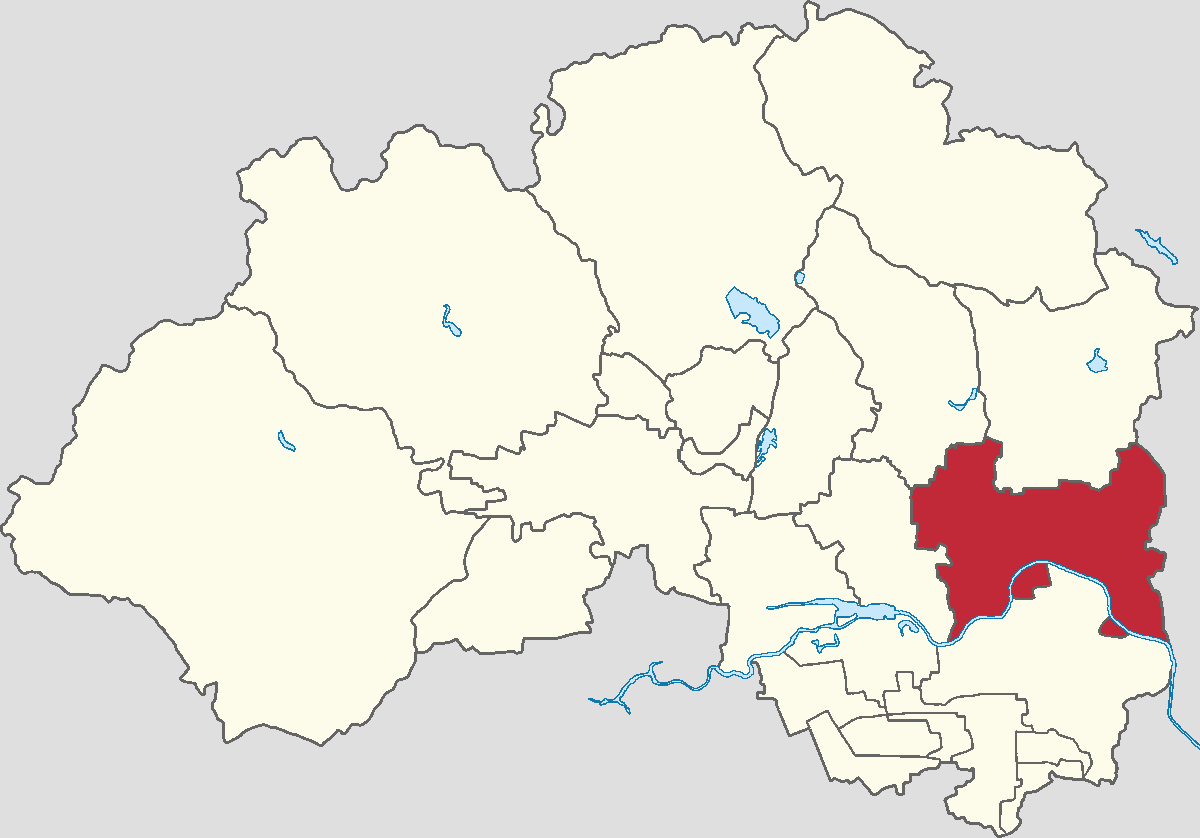
- Location inside of Changping District

- Location within Beijing Location within China
- Coordinates: 40°10′33″N 116°23′37″E
- Country: China
- Municipality: Beijing
- District: Changping
- Village-level Divisions: 6 community 24 villages

Area
  - Total: 69.95 km^{2} (27.01 sq mi)
- Elevation: 37 m (121 ft)

Population (2020)
  - Total: 80,273
  - Density: 1,148/km^{2} (2,972/sq mi)
- Time zone: UTC+8 (China Standard)
- Postal code: 102211
- Area code: 010

Xiaotangshan Town (simplified Chinese: 小汤山镇; traditional Chinese: 小湯山鎮; pinyin: Xiǎotāngshān Zhèn) is a small town in the Changping District of Beijing, China. It lies immediately outside Beijing's 6th Ring Road, to the north of the city. According to the 2020 census, Xiaotangshan was home to 80,273 inhabitants.

With a total area of 70.1 square kilometers, Xiaotangshan has rich geothermal resources, so much so that the name Xiaotangshan (Chinese: 小汤山; lit. 'Small Hot Spring Mountain') originated from its abundance of geothermal springs. Xiaotangshan Hospital appeared in the news in May 2003 when the government hastily built a 1000-bed field hospital there to deal with an outbreak of SARS.

== History ==
Timeline of Xiaotangshan's History
| Year | Status | Under |
|---|---|---|
| 1949–1956 | 4th District | Changping County |
| 1956–1958 | Sixiao District | Changping County |
| 1958–1982 | Xiaotangshan People's Commune (Beiqijiazhuang, Songlanbao and Shahe Working Stations separated away in 1959) | Changping County |
| 1982–1990 | Xiaotangshan Township | Changping County |
| 1990–1999 | Xiaotangshan Town (Integrated Dadongliu Township in 1997) | Changping County |
| 1999–present | Xiaotangshan Town (Integrated Dadongliu Township in 1997) | Changping District |

== Administrative divisions ==
By 2021, Xiaotangshan Town was divided into 30 subdivisions, more specifically 6 communities and 24 villages:

| Administrative division code | Subdivision names | Name transliteration | Type |
|---|---|---|---|
| 110114110001 | 市场街社区 | Shichangjiesheqv | Community |
| 110114110003 | 大东流社区 | Dadongliusheqv | Community |
| 110114110004 | 太阳城社区 | Taiyangchengsheqv | Community |
| 110114110005 | 汤南社区 | Tangnansheqv | Community |
| 110114110006 | 龙脉社区 | Longmaisheqv | Community |
| 110114110007 | 金汤社区 | Jintangsheqv | Community |
| 110114110201 | 小汤山村 | Xiaotangshancun | Village |
| 110114110202 | 尚信村 | Shangxincun | Village |
| 110114110203 | 讲礼村 | Jianglicun | Village |
| 110114110204 | 马坊村 | Mafangcun | Village |
| 110114110205 | 官牛坊村 | Guanniufangcun | Village |
| 110114110206 | 阿苏卫村 | Asuweicun | Village |
| 110114110207 | 葫芦河村 | Huluhecun | Village |
| 110114110208 | 大柳树村 | Daliushucun | Village |
| 110114110209 | 大汤山村 | Datangshancun | Village |
| 110114110210 | 后牛坊村 | Houniufangcun | Village |
| 110114110211 | 大东流村 | Dadongliucun | Village |
| 110114110212 | 土沟村 | Tugoucun | Village |
| 110114110213 | 酸枣岭村 | Suanzaolingcun | Village |
| 110114110214 | 前蔺沟村 | Qianlingoucun | Village |
| 110114110215 | 后蔺沟村 | Houlingoucun | Village |
| 110114110216 | 小东流村 | Xiaodongliucun | Village |
| 110114110217 | 常兴庄村 | Changxingzhuangcun | Village |
| 110114110218 | 大赴任庄村 | Dafurenzhuangcun | Village |
| 110114110219 | 小赴任庄村 | Xiaodurenzhuangcun | Village |
| 110114110220 | 赴任辛庄村 | Furenxinzhuangcun | Village |
| 110114110221 | 南官庄村 | Nanguanzhuangcun | Village |
| 110114110222 | 赖马庄村 | Laimazhuangcun | Village |
| 110114110223 | 西官庄村 | Xiguanzhuangcun | Village |
| 110114110224 | 东官庄村 | Dongguanzhuangcun | Village |

== Hot springs ==
Xiaotangshan has a long history of geothermal hot spring. The use of hot spring water can be traced back to the Southern and Northern Dynasties period of China, dating back over 1,500 years ago. The Xiaotangshan hot springs has records of early emperors using the springs for medical baths. The Qianlong Emperor of the Qing dynasty built the Xiaotangshan imperial palace and inscribed "九华兮秀". The hot spring water contains minerals and trace elements such as strontium, lithium, selenium, and other silicic acid mineral elements.

Xiaotangshan has rich geothermal resources. In Xiaotangshan center, resources are within 30 kilometers of ground water. Deep geothermal water depth in regions ranging from about 150–1400 meters to Xiaotangshan for the most shallow, less than one hundred meters. Due to the different regions and the depth of water, the water temperature is different, mostly in the 40-50 °C, the highest in the central area of Xiaotangshan 55-64 °C.

== Economy ==
In 1994, Xiaotangshan town was named the pilot town for the construction of small towns in Beijing. In 1995, it was identified as the national pioneer town of comprehensive reform. In 2002, it was named by the United Nations Development as the small pilot town for sustainable development in China. In 2003 it was named "National Environmentally Beautiful Town" by the National Environmental Protection Administration. In 2004, it was identified as the first batch of national development and Reform pilot town and the Ministry of Construction and other six ministries identified it as one of the 1887 focus town. In 2005, the China Mining Association named Xiaotangshan as "Chinese hot springs town", and the National Steering Committee awarded it as "spiritual civilization advanced the town".

== Features ==
- Xiaotangshan Palace, The Hot Springs and The Xiaotangshan Dragon Venture Hot Springs Plaza.
- Xiaotangshan Hospital, a hospital near Xiaotangshan hot spring, which became famous during the 2003 SARS epidemic. This saw a sudden increase in patients with the same condition and similar needs, and so an additional 'Rehabilitation Hospital' was built adjacent to the hospital site in little more than a week. The temporary structure, built of prefabricated units and with a service life of 3 years, was operational for 51 days in 2003, from April 30 to June 20. Subsequently, it was 'quietly abandoned' and in 2010 was to be demolished. It was rebuilt due to the COVID-19 pandemic.
- Xiaotangshan Modern Agricultural Science Demonstration Park, the largest modern agricultural park in China.

== Transport ==
- Line 17 - Weilaikexuechengbei (Future Science City North)
- G4501 – Shunyi, Mentougou

== See also ==
- Datangshan
