= Enshi =

Enshi may refer to:

- Enshi Tujia and Miao Autonomous Prefecture, in Hubei, China
- Enshi City, capital of Enshi Prefecture
