= Dabie Mountain Regional Medical Centre =

Hospital in Huanggang, Hubei, China

Dabie Mountain Regional Medical Centre 大别山区域医疗中心

Geography
- Location: Huangzhou, Huanggang, Hubei, China
- Coordinates: 30.453010°N 114.942335°E

Organisation
- Type: hospital

Services
- Beds: 1,000

History
- Founded: 28 January 2020

Links
- Lists: Hospitals in China

The Dabie Mountain Regional Medical Centre (Chinese: 大别山区域医疗中心; pinyin: Dàbiéshān Qūyù Yīliáo Zhōngxīn) is a hospital campus in Huangzhou District, Huanggang, Hubei, China. Originally constructed as a new campus for the eventual relocation of Huanggang Central Hospital, it was rapidly converted into a quarantine facility as a response to the COVID-19 pandemic which originated in Wuhan.

== History ==
Construction of the new hospital campus began in 2013 and the structures on the campus were completed in 2016 as a long-term project to relocate Huanggang Central Hospital. Renovations and installation of medical equipment was being carried out and was mostly completed when reported in January 2020. The campus was slated to be ready for its opening in May 2020.

However, due to the rapid spread of the coronavirus in Wuhan, authorities announced on 24 January 2020 the campus would be converted quickly to treat the virus patients. The works to convert the campus started on 25 January 2020 by converting the empty campus by 500 construction workers, electricians and policemen. Works were completed on 28 January 2020 after 48 hours and the hospital began receiving patients at 10:30 p.m.

== Design ==
The original design of the campus allowed a capacity of 2,000 beds. As a quarantine facility for the COVID-19 pandemic, the campus now has a capacity of 1,000 beds.

== See also ==
- Leishenshan Hospital
- Huoshenshan Hospital
