= Wuhan University School of Medicine =

Medical school in Whan, China

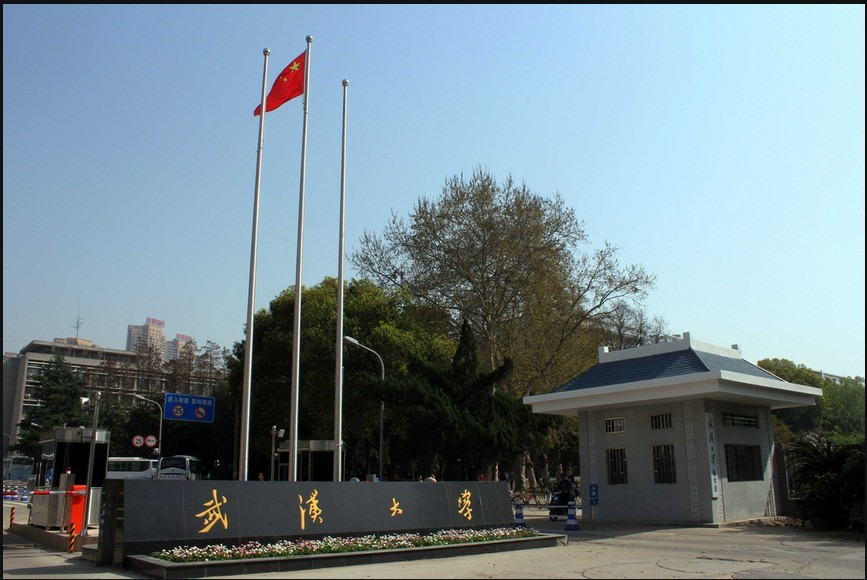
Wuhan University School of Medicine

The Wuhan University School of Medicine (Chinese: 武漢大學醫學部) is the medical school and one of the six faculties of Wuhan University in Wuhan, capital city of Hubei Province of China. Founded in 1943 as "Hubei Provincial Medical College", the school was renamed "Hubei Medical University" in 1993, and "Wuhan University School of Medicine" in 2000. At present, the school oversees 7 colleges, 3 research institutes and 8 affiliated hospitals. It also hosts the Journal of Wuhan University (Medical Edition).

== History ==
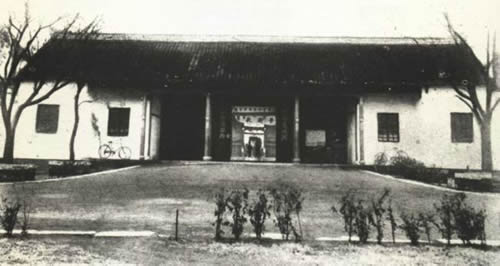
Main entrance of the Hubei Provincial Medical College Teaching Hospital

In 1943, the Hubei Provincial Medical College was founded. In 1953, the school was renamed Hubei Medical College. In January 1993, the school was renamed Hubei Medical University.

On August 2, 2000, the school merged with the former Wuhan University, Wuhan University of Hydraulic and Electric Engineering, and Wuhan Technical University of Surveying and Mapping to form the new Wuhan University, becoming the Wuhan University School of Medicine (WUSM). Wuhan University, Wuhan University of Hydraulic and Electric Engineering, and Wuhan Technical University of Surveying and Mapping are all key universities under China’s "Project 211".

Since 2011, Wuhan University has partnered with the World Health Foundation of the United States to offer a nursing program, running an "International Nursing Class".

In 2018, nine universities, including Wuhan University, jointly established the Medical "Double First-Class" Construction Alliance.

== Current situation ==
Wuhan University Medical School oversees 7 colleges and 3 research institutes, and has 8 affiliated hospitals.

- Colleges (7): College of Basic Medical Sciences, First Clinical College, Second Clinical College, College of Stomatology, College of Pharmacy, College of Health, College of Medical Vocational Technology.
- Research Institutes (3): Institute of Medical Virology, Medical Structural Biology Research Center, Animal Experiment Center.
- Affiliated Hospitals (8): Renmin Hospital of Wuhan University, Zhongnan Hospital of Wuhan University, Hospital of Stomatology Wuhan University, Asia Heart Clinical Medical School (Wuhan Asia heart hospital), Tongren Clinical Medical School (Tongren Hospital of Wuhan University), Wuhan General Hospital Clinical Medical School (Wuhan General Hospital of Guangzhou Military), Enshi Clinical College of Wuhan University, Zhongshan Hospital Affiliated to Wuhan University School of Medicine.

This school offers multiple programs leading to a medical degrees, including.

- Program Name: Clinical Medicine (Five-Year Program, Bachelor of Medicine), Language of Instruction: Chinese;
- Program Name: Clinical Medicine (Eight-Year Program, Doctor of Clinical Medicine), Language of Instruction: Chinese;
- Program Name: Clinical Medicine (MBBS Program, Bachelor of Medicine, Bachelor of Surgery), Language of Instruction: English;
- Program Name: Clinical Medicine (5+3 years Program, Master of Clinical Medicine), Language of Instruction: Chinese.

As of the year of 2017, there are 6573 registered students in total, among which 3288 are undergraduates, 1945 are master’s candidates, 696 are doctoral candidates, and 644 are international students. Ten years after the merger of Wuhan University, the ranking of the medical programs has risen from 19th in the country to 11th. Wuhan University Medical School is also one of the eight mainland Chinese medical schools recognized by the Ministry of Health of Singapore.

Main Address:115 Donghu Road, Wuhan, Hubei 430071, China.

== See also ==
- Wuhan University
- Tongji Medical College
