= Leishenshan Hospital =

Hospital in Hubei, China

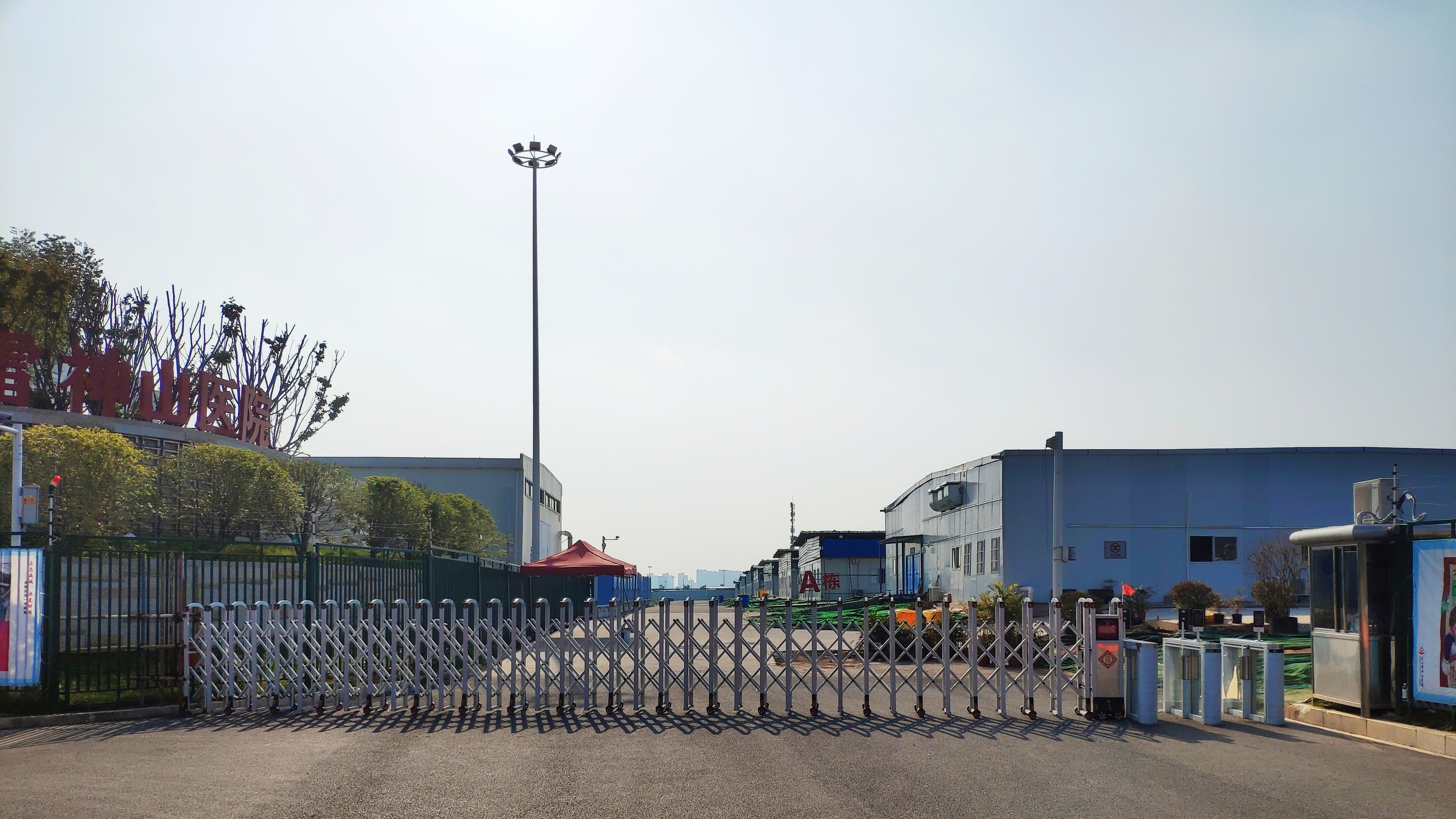

Geography
- Location: Jiangxia District, Wuhan, Hubei, China
- Coordinates: 30.432048°N 114.288276°E

Services
- Beds: 1,600 (official); 1,500 (operational)

History
- Founded: 8 February 2020; 20 February 2020 (Fully opened)
- Closed: 15 April 2020

Links
- Lists: Hospitals in China

Chinese name
- Simplified Chinese: 雷神山医院
- Traditional Chinese: 雷神山醫院
- Literal meaning: Mount Thunder God Hospital
Transcriptions
Standard Mandarin
- Hanyu Pinyin: Léishénshān Yīyuàn

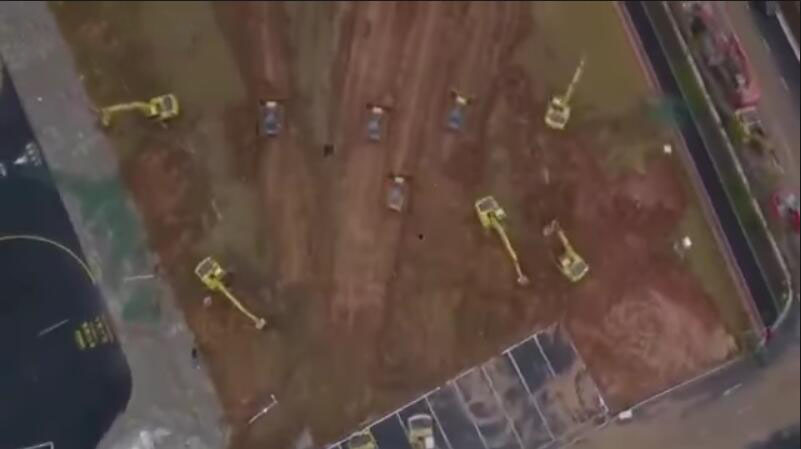
Construction site of Leishenshan Hospital.

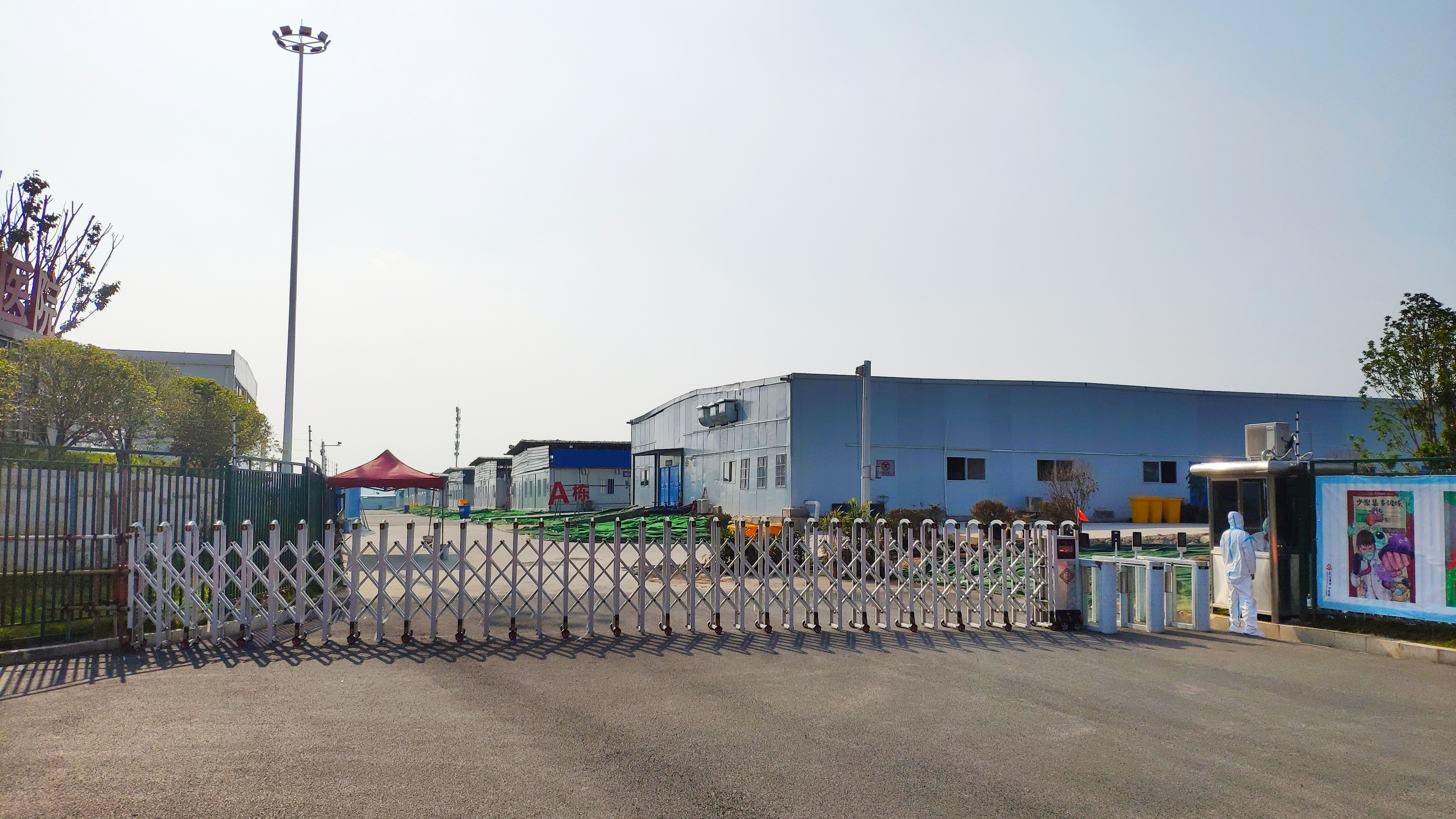
Wuhan Leishenshan Hospital

Leishenshan Hospital (Chinese: 雷神山医院; lit. 'Mount Thunder God Hospital') was an emergency specialty field hospital built in response to the COVID-19 pandemic. The facility is located at No.3 Parking Lot of the Athletes Village in Jiangxia District, Wuhan, Hubei. Stage one of construction was completed on 6 February 2020, and the hospital opened on 8 February 2020. Along with the Huoshenshan Hospital, a further sixteen other temporary treatment facilities were set up for isolation and treatment of COVID-19 cases. Leishenshan and Huoshenshan hospitals were closed on 15 April 2020.

== Etymology ==
The name "Leishen" (雷神; 'God of Thunder') refers to Leigong, a deity in Chinese folk religion who punishes both earthly mortals guilty of secret crimes and evil spirits who have used their knowledge of Taoism to harm human beings.

The name "Lei" (雷; 'Thunder') is also related to the concept of wood (木) in wuxing (五行), wherein wood begets fire (木生火) and fire overcomes metal (火克金). In traditional Chinese medicine, the metal element (金) governs the lung (肺), so the name conveys the hope that the respiratory infection caused by SARS-CoV-2 will eventually be eliminated.

== History ==
At 3:30 p.m. on 25 January 2020, the Wuhan municipal government decided to establish an additional hospital named "Leishenshan Hospital" in response to the COVID-19 pandemic and appointed China Construction Third Engineering Bureau Group Co.Ltd.as the main contractor for this emergency project. The hospital was located at No.3 Parking Lot of the Athletes Village in Jiangxia District of Wuhan. On January 27, the National Development and Reform Commission announced the allocation of 300 million yuan to subsidize the construction of Huoshenshan Hospital and Leishenshan Hospital. The same day, the State Grid Corporation of China announced a donation of 60.28 million yuan worth of physical materials for the construction of the two hospitals.

On 6 February 2020, the construction of the hospital was completed. Two days later on 8 February 2020, a total of 1,600 beds were delivered to the hospital. On the same day, Vice Premier Sun Chunlan visited the building. She stressed that treatment should be carried out based on the priority of the severity of the patient's condition. The first patients were admitted to the hospital on the same day.

As of 20 February 2020, the hospital had an operational capacity of 1500 beds.

On 15 April 2020, it was 'retired' after treating 2,011 patients. It currently remains on standby.

== Design ==
The hospital is a field hospital-based building with modular design. It has 32 zones for patients, two of which are for those in critical condition and three for those with serious symptoms.

== See also ==
- Dabie Mountain Regional Medical Centre
- Huoshenshan Hospital
- Fangcang hospital
