= List of medical schools in China =

This is a list of medical schools located in People's Republic of China, that confer the MBBS degree and are WHO approved.

== Anhui ==
- Anhui Medical University
- Division of Life Sciences and Medicine, USTC
- School of Medicine, Anhui University of Science and Technology
- Bengbu Medical College
- Wannan Medical College

== Beijing ==
- Peking University Health Science Center
- Tsinghua University School of Medicine
- Peking Union Medical College
- Capital Medical University
- People's Liberation Army General Hospital and Medical School
- Medical School, UCAS

== Chongqing ==
- Chongqing Medical University
- Army Medical University

== Fujian ==
- Xiamen University School of Medicine
- Fujian Medical University
- Fujian University of Traditional Chinese Medicine
- Putian University

== Gansu ==
- Lanzhou University Health Science Center
- Gansu University of Chinese Medicine
- Hexi University
- Gansu Medical College
- Northwest Minzu University

== Guangdong ==
- Chinese University of Hong Kong, Shenzhen
- Guangdong Medical University
- Guangdong Pharmaceutical University
- Guangzhou Medical University
- SCUT School of Medicine
- Guangzhou University of Traditional Chinese Medicine
- Jiaying University
- Jinan University School of Medicine
- Shaoguan University
- Shantou University Medical College
- Shenzhen University Medical School
- SUSTech School of Medicine
- Southern Medical University
- Sun Yat-sen University (Zhongshan School of Medicine)

== Guangxi ==
- Guangxi Medical University
- Guilin Medical University
- Guangxi University of Chinese Medicine
- Youjiang Medical University for Nationalities

== Guizhou ==
- Guizhou Medical University
- Zunyi Medical University

== Hainan ==
- Hainan Medical University

== Hebei ==
- Hebei Medical University
- Hebei University
- Chengde Medical University
- Hebei North University
- Hebei University of Engineering
- North China University of Science and Technology

== Heilongjiang ==
- Harbin Medical University
- School of Clinical Medicine, Jiamusi University
- Qiqihar Medical University
- Heilongjiang University of Chinese Medicine
- Mudanjiang Medical University

== Henan ==
- Henan University
- Henan Medical College of Zhengzhou University
- Henan University of Science and Technology
- Xinxiang Medical University

== Hong Kong ==
- The Chinese University of Hong Kong, Faculty of Medicine
- Li Ka Shing Faculty of Medicine, The University of Hong Kong
- HKUST School of Medicine (Currently developing their MBBS program)

== Hubei ==
- Wuhan University School of Medicine
- Wuhan University of Science and Technology
- Huazhong University of Science and Technology (Tongji Medical College)
- Hubei University of Medicine
- China Three Gorges University
- Jianghan University
- Yangtze University
- Hubei Polytechnic University
- Hubei University of Chinese Medicine

== Hunan ==
- Xiangya School of Medicine
- Changsha Medical University
- Hunan Normal University
- Hunan University
- Hunan University of Medicine
- Jishou University
- Hengyang Medical School
- Xiangnan University
- Hunan University of Chinese Medicine

== Inner Mongolia ==
- Baotou Medical College
- Inner Mongolia Medical University
- Chifeng university

== Jiangsu ==
- Jiangnan University
- Jiangsu University
- Nanjing Medical University
- Nanjing University Medical School
- Nanjing University of Chinese Medicine
- Nantong University
- Medical College of Soochow University
- Southeast University School of Medicine
- Xuzhou Medical University
- Yangzhou University

== Jiangxi ==
- Jinggangshan University
- Jiujiang University
- Nanchang University (Jiangxi Medical College)
- Yichun University
- Gannan Medical University
- Jiangxi University Of Traditional Chinese Medicine

== Jilin ==
- Norman Bethune Health Science Center of Jilin University
- Yanbian University
- Beihua University
- Jilin Medical University

== Liaoning ==
- China Medical University (PRC)
- Dalian Medical University
- Dalian University
- Jinzhou Medical University
- Shenyang Medical College

== Ningxia ==
- Ningxia Medical University

== Macau ==
- Macau University of Science and Technology

== Qinghai ==
- Qinghai University

== Sichuan ==
- Sichuan University (West China Medical Center)
- Chengdu Medical College
- North Sichuan Medical College
- Southwest Medical University
- Chengdu University of Traditional Chinese Medicine
- School of Medicine of UESTC

== Shaanxi ==
- Xi'an Jiaotong University Health Science Center
- Air Force Medical University
- Shaanxi University of Chinese Medicine
- Yan'an University

== Shandong ==
- Cheeloo College of Medicine, Shandong University
- Qingdao Medical College
- Binzhou Medical University
- Jining Medical University
- Shandong First Medical University
- Shandong Second Medical University

== Shanghai ==
- Shanghai Jiao Tong University (School of Medicine, Shanghai Jiao Tong University)
- Fudan University (Shanghai Medical College, Fudan University
- Tongji University School of Medicine
- Shanghai University of Chinese Medicine
- Shanghai University of Medicine & Health Sciences
- Naval Medical University

== Shanxi ==
- Shanxi Medical University
- Changzhi Medical College
- Shanxi Datong University

== Tianjin ==
- Medical School of Tianjin University
- Nankai University School of Medicine
- Tianjin Medical University

== Tibet ==
- Medical College, Tibet University
- School of Medicine, Xizang Minzu University

== Xinjiang ==
- Shihezi University
- Xinjiang Medical University
- Xinjiang Second Medical College

== Yunnan ==
- School of Clinical Medicine, Dali University
- Kunming Medical University
- Kunming University of Science and Technology

== Zhejiang ==
- School of Medicine, Zhejiang University
- Wenzhou Medical University
- Hangzhou Normal University
- Huzhou University
- Ningbo University Health Science Center
- Jiaxing University
- Shaoxing University
- Taizhou University

== Independent (or private) colleges ==
- Clinical College, Hebei Medical University
- Faculty of Medicine, Shuda College, Hunan Normal University
- Kangda College, Nanjing Medical University
- Faculty of Medicine, Jitang College, North China University of Science and Technology
- Faculty of Medicine, Science & Technology College, Shihezi University
- Clinical Medical College, Tianjin Medical University
- Faculty of Medicine, Hangzhou City University

== Newly-established ==
There are several newly established medical schools in mainland China which have not been authorised to confer the MBBS so far, they might be in the next years:

- School of Medicine, South China University of Technology
- School of Medicine, Southwest Jiaotong University
- School of Medicine, University of Electronic Science and Technology of China
- School of Medicine, University of Science and Technology of China

== See also ==
- Medical school
- List of medical schools
