= Hengyang Medical School =

Medical school in Hengyang, China

Hengyang Medical School (simplified Chinese: 衡阳医学院; traditional Chinese: 衡陽醫學院; pinyin: Héngyáng Yīxuéyuàn), or "Hengyang Medical College", is the medical school of University of South China in Hengyang City, Hunan Province of south China. Founded in 1958, the school is now a top medical institution in Hunan, integrating medical education, research and health care.

== History ==
In 1958, Hengyang Medical College was founded in Hengyang, Hunan.

In 1964, the school was renamed Hengyang Medical Junior College.

In 1977, the school resumed its undergraduate program as well as the name "Hengyang Medical College".

In 1993, the Chinese Journal of Arteriosclerosis (中国动脉硬化杂志) was founded. It is sponsored by the Chinese Society for Pathophysiology and Nanhua University.

In 2000, with the approval of the Ministry of Education, the school was merged with the Central South Institute of Technology to form the University of South China (or Nanhua University), and became its Faculty of Medicine.

In 2018, the school was renamed "Hengyang Medical School, University of South China".

In 2024, the Hunan Training Base of the Chinese Anti-Cancer Association was established at Hengyang Medical School.

== Programs ==
Hengyang Medical School offers teaching programs leading to undergraduate and postgraduate degrees, including Bachelor of Medicine (5 years) and Bachelor of Medicine, Bachelor of Surgery (M.B.B.S., 5 years).

In addition to clinical medicine, there are programs in nursing, dentistry, pharmacy, and medical technology.

== Affiliated Hospitals ==
The hospitals include

- The First Affiliated Hospital/First Clinical College of Nanhua University
- The Second Affiliated Hospital/Second Clinical College of Nanhua University
- The Third Affiliated Hospital of Nanhua University
- Nanhua Hospital Affiliated to University of South China/Nanhua Clinical College
- Changsha Central Hospital Affiliated to Nanhua University/Changsha Central Hospital Clinical College
- Maternal and Child Health Hospital Affiliated to Nanhua University
- The Seventh Affiliated Hospital of Nanhua University.
- The Affiliated Hunan Provincial Institute of Occupational Disease Prevention and Treatment

and four collaborative affiliated hospitals (all Grade A tertiary hospitals).

== Other information ==
As of May 21, 2026, Hengyang Medical School has 7,286 full-time undergraduate students, over 3,000 graduate students, and 372 international students. There are over 400 basic science faculty members and over 3,900 clinical faculty members.

In academic research, the school published 77 papers listed in Nature Index for the Time frame of 1 May 2025 - 30 April 2026, including 48 in Health sciences. Clinical Medicine, Immunology, Pharmacology & Toxicology, Biology & Biochemistry, and Molecular Biology & Genetics are ranked in the top 1% globally by ESI.

Contact address: West Changsheng Road, Hengyang, Hunan, China.

== See also ==
- University of South China
- List of medical schools in China
