= School of Medicine of UESTC =

The School of Medicine of UESTC (Chinese: 电子科技大学医学院) is the medical school of the University of Electronic Science and Technology of China (UESTC). Established in 2013, the school now has four affiliated hospitals and offers programs for undergraduate, master and doctoral degrees, integrating medical education, research and treatment.

== History ==
On September 29, 2013, on the occasion of the 57th anniversary of the founding of the University of Electronic Science and Technology of China, the University and the Sichuan Provincial People's Hospital officially signed an agreement to jointly build the School of Medicine of UESTC. On December 25, the School of Medicine of UESTC was officially established.

On July 22, 2016, Sichuan Provincial Cancer Hospital signed an agreement to join the School of Medicine of UESTC, becoming an affiliated hospital of the Medical School.

On June 3, 2019, Chengdu Women and Children's Central Hospital signed an agreement to become an affiliated hospital of the School of Medicine of UESTC.

On December 22, 2020, Mianyang Central Hospital signed an agreement to join the School of Medicine of UESTC as an affiliated hospital. In the same year, the school's clinical medicine entered the top 1% of ESI globally.

In 2026, the school became a first-author institution to publish a regular paper on Journal Cell.

== Hospitals ==
There are four affiliated hospitals, all of which are Grade A tertiary hospitals:

- Sichuan Provincial People's Hospital (founded in 1941),
- Sichuan Provincial Cancer Hospital (founded in 1988),
- Chengdu Women and Children's Central Hospital,
- Mianyang Central Hospital.

== Programs ==
The school offers study programs for different degrees, including.

- Undergraduate programs in clinical medicine and nursing;
- Master programs in pharmacy, clinical medicine, nursing and stomatology;
- PhD program in biomedical engineering.

== Other information ==
As of October 2025, the school has more than 1,500 undergraduate and postgraduate students, and over 900 full-time teachers, including an academician of the Chinese Academy of Sciences. There are five departments: the Department of Clinical Medicine, Department of Nursing, Department of Pharmacy, Department of Stomatology, and Department of Basic Medical Sciences.

The University of Electronic Science and Technology of China published 101 papers in health sciences and 15 in biomedical sciences listed in Nature Index for the time period of 1 June 2025 - 30 May 2026.

In the "QS World University Rankings by Subject: Medicine 2026", School of Medicine of UESTC ranks in 651-700th among the 848 medical schools of the world.

The school has international academic cooperation and exchanges with medical institutions in the United Kingdom, the United States, Singapore, Malaysia and Russia.

== See also ==
- University of Electronic Science and Technology of China
- List of medical schools in China
