= Nankai University School of Medicine =

Medical school in Tianjin, China

Nankai University School of Medicine (Chinese: 南開大學醫學院)
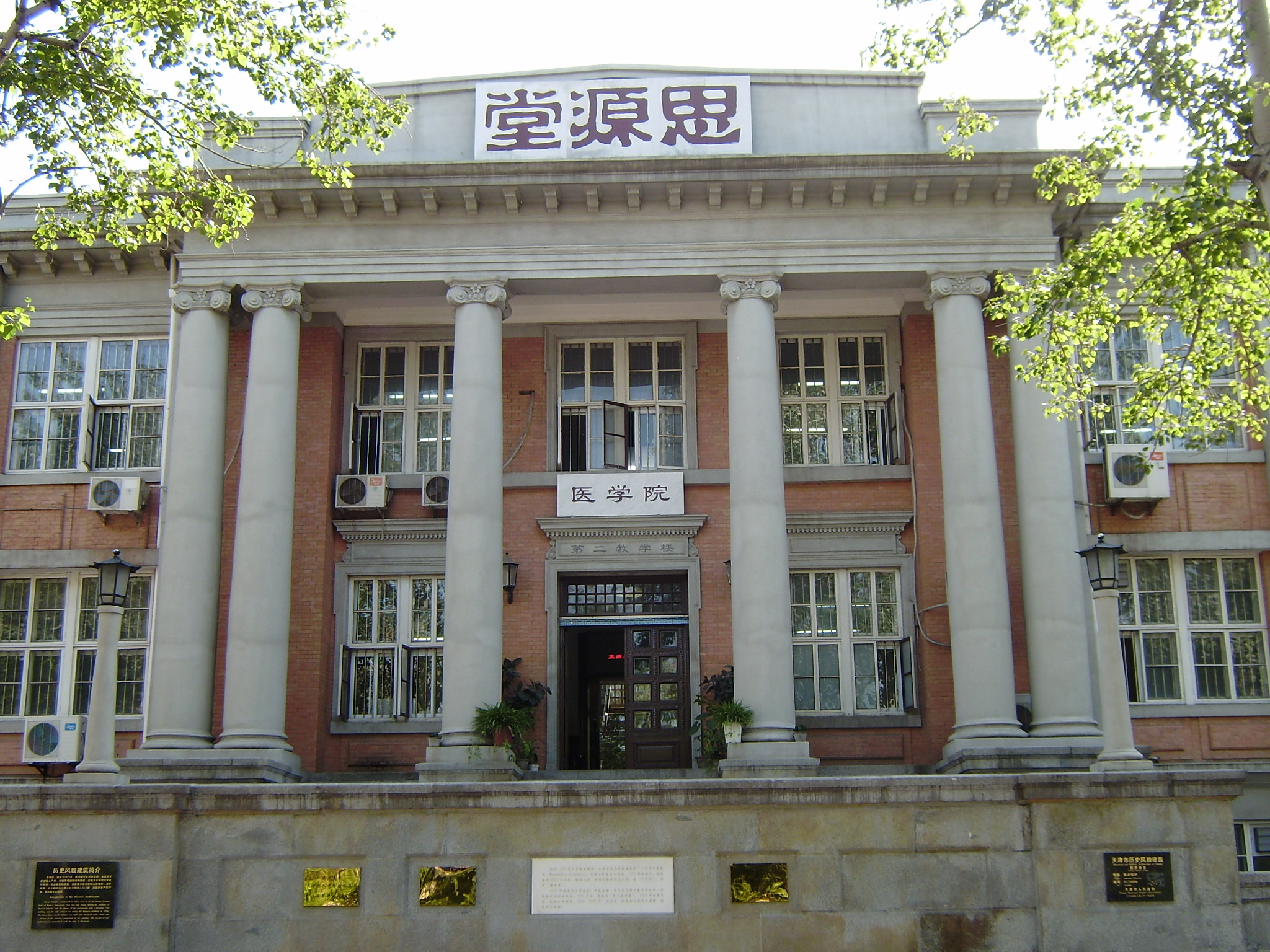
- Siyuan Hall
- Type: public
- Established: Preparatory work began in 1988; formally established in 1993.
- President: Sheng Zhongyang
- Location: Nankai District, Tianjin Municipality, China
- Website: http://medical.nankai.edu.cn/

Nankai University School of Medicine (simplified Chinese: 南开大学医学院; traditional Chinese: 南開大學醫學院), or "School of Medicine, Nankai University", is the medical school of Nankai University in Tianjin, Chian. With a history dated back to 1930, the school's establishment work started in 1988 and completed in 1993. The medical school is now a public institution integrating medical teaching, research and treatment. It focuses on combining traditional Chinese medical practices with modern Western medicine techniques. It also has close and comprehensive cooperation with the PLA General Hospital.

== History ==
The history of the Nankai University School of Medicine can be traced back to 1930, when pre-med education started at the University.

In 1988, establishment of the School of Medicine of Nankai University was put under preparation.

In 1989, the school started to admit students.

In 1993, the school was officially established with approval by the former State Education Commission. Professor Chen Wenjie, an expert in pathophysiology and hematology, served as the first dean of the School of Medicine. After its establishment, the School of Medicine moved into Siyuan Hall.

In 2007, Nankai University and the PLA General Hospital signed an agreement in Beijing for closed comprehensive joint medical education. Since then, the two sides have carried out all-round cooperation in the fields of talent training, discipline construction, teaching and scientific research.

In October 2017, Nankai University signed strategic cooperation agreements with 12 tertiary-level hospitals, including Tianjin First Central Hospital, Tianjin Third Central Hospital, Tianjin Fourth Central Hospital, Tianjin Eye Hospital, Tianjin Stomatological Hospital, Tianjin People's Hospital, Tianjin Chest Hospital, Tianjin Huanhu Hospital, Tianjin Nankai Hospital, Tianjin Second People's Hospital, Tianjin Central Obstetrics and Gynecology Hospital, and the 254th Hospital of the Chinese People's Liberation Army. These hospitals were to undertake the clinical teaching tasks of the School of Medicine of Nankai University.

On December 4, 2024, Nankai University, Tianjin University, and the Tianjin Municipal Health Commission held a signing ceremony. The Tianjin Municipal Health Commission and Nankai University agreed to jointly develop Tianjin People's Hospital, designating it as a directly affiliated hospital of Nankai University and officially naming it the First Affiliated Hospital of Nankai University.

== Teaching Hospitals ==
The medical school has multiple teaching hospitals, including

- Tianjin PLA 254th Hospital – Affiliated Hospital of Nankai University School of Medicine
- Institute of Hematology and Blood Diseases Hospital, CAMS & PUMC – Teaching Hospital of Nankai University School of Medicine
- Tianjin First Central Hospital – Clinical Hospital of Nankai University School of Medicine
- Tianjin Children's Hospital – Teaching Hospital of Nankai University School of Medicine
- Tianjin Third Central Hospital – Clinical Hospital of Nankai University
- Tianjin Stomatological Hospital – Stomatological Hospital of Nankai University
- People's Liberation Army General Hospital and Medical School – Teaching Hospital of Nankai University
- Tianjin People's Hospital – People's Hospital of Nankai University
- Tianjin Eye Hospital – Eye Hospital of Nankai University

== Other information ==
Nankai University School of Medicine has two campuses: the Balitai Campus (old) and the Jinnan Cmapus (new), with a floor area of 11,000 square meters.

The programs offered by the school include

- Title: Master of Medicine; Year Instruction Began: 2014; Curriculum Duration: 8 years; Language of Instruction: Chinese.
- Title: Bachelor of Medicine; Year Instruction Began: 2014; Curriculum Duration: 6 years; Language of Instruction: English.

The school focuses on combining traditional Chinese medical practices with modern Western medicine techniques, and emphasis on community service and healthcare outreach programs.

There are 98 full-time faculty members, 480 undergraduate students, 288 master students, 144 Ph.D.candidates and 20 international students.

In the past five years, the school has undertaken more than 230 research projects, with a total research funding of 48 million yuan RMB. More than 500 academic papers were published in well-known academic journals, among which more than 180 are SCI-indexed.

Contact Address: 94 Weijin Road, Tianjin (300071), China.

== See also ==
- Nankai University
- First Affiliated Hospital of Nankai University
- List of medical schools in China
