= Division of Life Sciences and Medicine, USTC =

The Division of Life Sciences and Medicine, USTC (Chinese: 中国科学技术大学生命科学与医学部), or the "Faculty of Life Sciences and Medicine, USTC", Official full name "Division of Life Sciences and Medicine of the University of Science and Technology of China", is a faculty of the University of Science and Technology of China (USTC) located in Hefei, capital of Anhui Province in eastern China. With a history tracible to 1958, the division was established in 2017 based on the School of Life Sciences, with Anhui Provincial Hospital as its first affiliated hospital. The "USTC New Medicine" features "interdisciplinary integration of science, engineering and medicine, and integrated development of life sciences and medicine".

== History ==
In 1958, the Department of Biophysics of the University of Science and Technology of China was founded.

In 1978, it was renamed "Department of Biology".

In 1998, the department was expanded to the "School of Life Sciences", with four departments: the Department of Molecular and Cell Biology, the Department of Biophysics and Neuroscience, the Department of System Biology, and the Department of Medical Biotechnology.

In December 2017, the school was further expanded into the "Division of Life Sciences and Medicine of the University of Science and Technology of China", with three additions of Schools. Anhui Provincial Hospital with more than 5000 beds became its first affiliated hospital. The Division was jointly established by Anhui Province, the National Health and Family Planning Commission, and the Chinese Academy of Sciences.

In 2019, the research project "Activation, Regulation and Effector Mechanisms of Inflammatory Macrophages" won the second prize of the National Natural Science Award.

In 2022, the division was approved to offer the doctoral degree in Clinical Medicine.

In 2024, the division was approved to offer the doctoral degree in Biology and Medicine.

== Current situation ==
The Division of Life Sciences and Medicine comprises the following departments: School of Life Sciences, School of Basic Medical Sciences, School of Clinical Medicine, School of Biomedical Engineering, Institute of Public Health, the First Affiliated Hospital of USTC (Anhui Provincial Hospital), the Life Sciences Experimental Center, and the Life Sciences Experimental Teaching Demonstration Center.

The Division has 203 full-time staff members, including one academician of the Chinese Academy of Sciences and one academician of the Chinese Academy of Engineering.

The Division offers undergraduate programs in Biological Sciences, Biotechnology, and Clinical Medicine, as well as several doctoral and master's degree programs. It also boasts a "Double First-Class" discipline (Biology).

In academic research, the Division published 231 papers listed in Nature Index for the Time frame of 1 April 2025 - 31 March 2026, including 157 in Health sciences and 33 in Biological sciences. From 2020 to 2024, the division published 6,208 SCI-indexed papers, including 34 papers in the four top journals of Science, Nature, Cell, and the New England Journal of Medicine. Nine research disciplines are ranked in the top 1% ESI.

The main characteristics of "USTC New Medicine" are interdisciplinary integration of science, engineering and medicine and integrated development of life sciences and medicine.

Address: Division of Life Sciences and Medicine, 443 Huangshan Road, Hefei, Anhui Povince, China.

== First Affiliated Hospital ==
The First Affiliated Hospital of the University of Science and Technology of China, also known as "Anhui Provincial Hospital", is a Grade A tertiary hospital located in Hefei, Anhui Province, People's Republic of China. With a history tracible to the Hefei Christian Hospital founded in 1898, it has developed into a large hospital system of six campuses:

• Central Campus: Core medical and management hub.

• South Campus: Specialized in neurology and cardiovascular diseases.

• West Campus: Focused on oncology.

• North Campus: National Trauma Regional Medical Center.

• Infectious Disease Campus: Dedicated to infectious disease control.

• Binhu Campus (under construction): Geriatric care and research. The total area (including the planned area) is 0.63 square kilometers.

There are totally 5,000-plus beds, with 3.7 million outpatients served annually.

== See also ==
- University of Science and Technology of China
- List of medical schools in China
