= SCUT School of Medicine =

Medical school in Guangzhou, China

South China University of Technology School of Medicine
- 华南理工大学医学院
- Type: Public
- Established: 2014; 12 years ago
- Parent institution: South China University of Technology
- President: Xueqing Yu
- Location: China
- Campus: Urban
- Website: www2.scut.edu.cn/med_en/

Chinese name
- Simplified Chinese: 华南理工大学医学院
- Traditional Chinese: 華南理工大學醫學院
Transcriptions
Standard Mandarin
- Hanyu Pinyin: Huánán Lǐgōng Dàxué Yīxuéyuàn

The SCUT School of Medicine (Chinese: 华南理工大学医学院) is the medical school of South China University of Technology (SCUT) in Guangzhou of south China. Jointly established by SCUT and Guangdong Provincial People's Hospital (or Guangdong Academy of Medical Sciences) in 2014, the school has developed into a medical institution with a number of affiliated hospitals, integrating medical education, academic research and health treatment.

== Historical Development ==
On September 12, 2014, the South China University of Technology (SCUT) and Guangdong Provincial People's Hospital announced the joint establishment of the School of Medicine of SCUT.

In 2015, the school officially began enrolling undergraduate and graduate students.

In February and June 2017, Guangzhou First People's Hospital and Guangdong Provincial People's Hospital became affiliated hospitals of SCUT. In March of the same year, the foundation stone was laid for the South China University of Technology Affiliated Tianhe Hospital (Tianhe District Second People's Hospital), jointly built by SCUT and the Tianhe District Government.

In November 2017, the School of Medicine's Clinical Medicine discipline entered the top 1% globally in the Essential Science Indicators (ESI) database.

In 2019, the School of Medicine officially began enrolling undergraduate students in Clinical Medicine.

In 2024, South China University of Technology started planning to scale up the medical school into a medical center.

== Programs ==
The School offers graduate and undergraduate degree programs, including:

- Doctoral degree programs: Biology, Biomedical Engineering;
- Master's degree programs: Clinical Medicine, Pharmaceutical Sciences;
- Undergraduate programs: Clinical Medicine, Medical Imaging Technology

Among them, Clinical Medicine entered the top 1% globally in the Essential Science Indicators (ESI) database in 2017;Biomedical Engineering is a key discipline in Guangdong Province.

== Affiliated Hospitals ==
- Affiliated Guangdong Provincial People's Hospital
- Affiliated Second Hospital (Guangzhou First People's Hospital)
- Affiliated Third Hospital (Qianhai Life Insurance Guangzhou General Hospital)
- Affiliated Sixth Hospital (Foshan Nanhai District People's Hospital)
- Affiliated Zhuhai Women and Children's Hospital (Zhuhai Maternal and Child Health Hospital)

== Other information ==
As of September 2025, the school has 479 faculty members and over 1,200 students.

The SCUT published 102 papers in health sciences and 148 in biomedical sciences listed in Nature Index for the time period of 1 June 2025 - 30 May 2026.

In the "QS World University Rankings by Subject: Medicine 2026", SCUT School of Medicine ranks 601-650th among the 848 medical schools of the world.

The school has developed academic exchanges and cooperation with universities in the United States, United Kingdoms, Australia, Japan, Canada, France and Germany.

Address: B2 Building, South China University of Technology, Guangzhou University Town, Panyu District, Guangzhou City, China.

== See also ==
- Guangdong Provincial People's Hospital
- South China University of Technology
- List of medical schools in China
