= Xi'an Jiaotong University Health Science Center =

Medical school in Xi'an, China

- 西安交通大学医学部
- Type: Public
- Established: 1937; 89 years ago
- Affiliations: Xi'an Jiaotong University
- President: Lv Yi
- Location: Xi'an, China
- Campus: Urban
- Website: www.med.xjtu.edu.cn/Home/Home.htm

Chinese name
- Simplified Chinese: 西安交通大学医学部
- Traditional Chinese: 西安交通大學醫學部
Transcriptions
Standard Mandarin
- Hanyu Pinyin: Xī'ān Jiāotōng Dàxué Yīxuébù

The Xi'an Jiaotong University Health Science Center (formerly Xi'an Medical University) is the Medical School of Xi'an Jiaotong University. It was founded in 1937 as the Medical School of National Peiping University, with a history tracible to the first national school of Western medicine in China.

== History ==
Xi'an Jiaotong University Health Science Center traces its origins to the Public Peking Medical School, founded on October 26, 1912 as the first national school of Western medicine in China.

In November 1928, the Public Peking Medical School was renamed as "Peking University Medical School".

During the Anti-Japanese War, three universities in Beijing and Tianjin: National Peiping University (with a medical school), National Peiping Normal University, and National Beiyang Institute of Technology; relocated westward to Shaanxi to escape the war. In 1937, the "Xi'an Temporary University" was established based on the three universities.

In 1938, the National Northwest Institute of Technology and the National Northwest Agricultural College were separated from the Xi'an Temporary University, and the remaining parts were renamed the "National Northwest Associated University".

In 1939, the "National Northwest Medical College" and the National Northwest Normal College were separated from the National Northwest Associated University, while the remaining parts were renamed National Northwest University.

In 1946, the National Northwest Medical College was merged back into the National Northwest University, becoming the "National Northwest University Medical School".

In 1950, it was separated again, from the National Northwest University, and was renamed the "Northwest Medical College",

In 1956, it was renamed "Xi'an Medical College".

In 1985, it was renamed "Xi'an Medical University", becoming one of the key universities directly under the Ministry of Health.

In April 2000, Xi'an Medical University merged with Xi'an Jiaotong University and Shaanxi University of Finance and Economics, and was renamed the "Xi'an Jiaotong University School of Medicine".

In 2012, it was renamed the "Xi'an Jiaotong University Health Science Center".

In 2015, The center was listed in the first batch of medical colleges in China to enroll students in the seven-year clinical medicine program, and pilot institutions for the integrated training of clinical medicine (5+3) programs.

== Subordinate departments ==
The teaching departments include: the School of Basic Medical Sciences, School of Public Health, School of Pharmacy, School of Forensic Medicine, and the Department of Nursing.

The affiliated hospital include: the First Affiliated Hospital, Second Affiliated Hospital, Hospital of Stomatology, all of Grade A tertiary hospitals. There are 5,000 beds for patients from outside the university, around five million annual outpatient visits, 180,000 annual inpatients and 100,000 annual surgical operations.

== Teaching ==
The center offers the academic programs of:

- Clinical Medicine (5-year study, “5+3 year integration”),
- Stomatology (5-year study),
- Preventive Medicine (5-year study),
- Forensic Medicine (5-year study),
- Basic Medicine (5-year study),
- Nursing,
- Pharmacy,
- Pharmaceutical Engineering.

There are 5,551 students, including 632 international students and 564 doctoral degree students. There are more than 8,700 faculties and staffs, over 1,300 teachers with professor or associate professor titles.

== Research ==
In the past 5 years, HSC has won 4 national awards, and published 1,200 SCI-indexed research articles annually.

Dluring the year from 1 December 2024 to 30 November 2025, the center altogether had 176 research papers listed on Nature Index.

== See also ==
- Xi'an Jiaotong University
- List of medical schools in China
