= Norman Bethune Health Science Center of Jilin University =

Medical school of Jilin University, China

The Norman Bethune Health Science Center of Jilin University, shortly Bethune Health Science Center, is the medical school of Jilin University in Changchun, capital of Jilin Province of China. Founded in 1939, Bethune Health Science Center is now one of the ten university medical schools jointly established by the Chinese Ministry of Education and the Ministry of Health. It is named in honor of Dr. Norman Bethune, the Canadian surgeon celebrated in China for his humanitarian contributions.

== History ==
Norman Bethune Health Science Center of Jilin University
- 吉林大学白求恩医学部
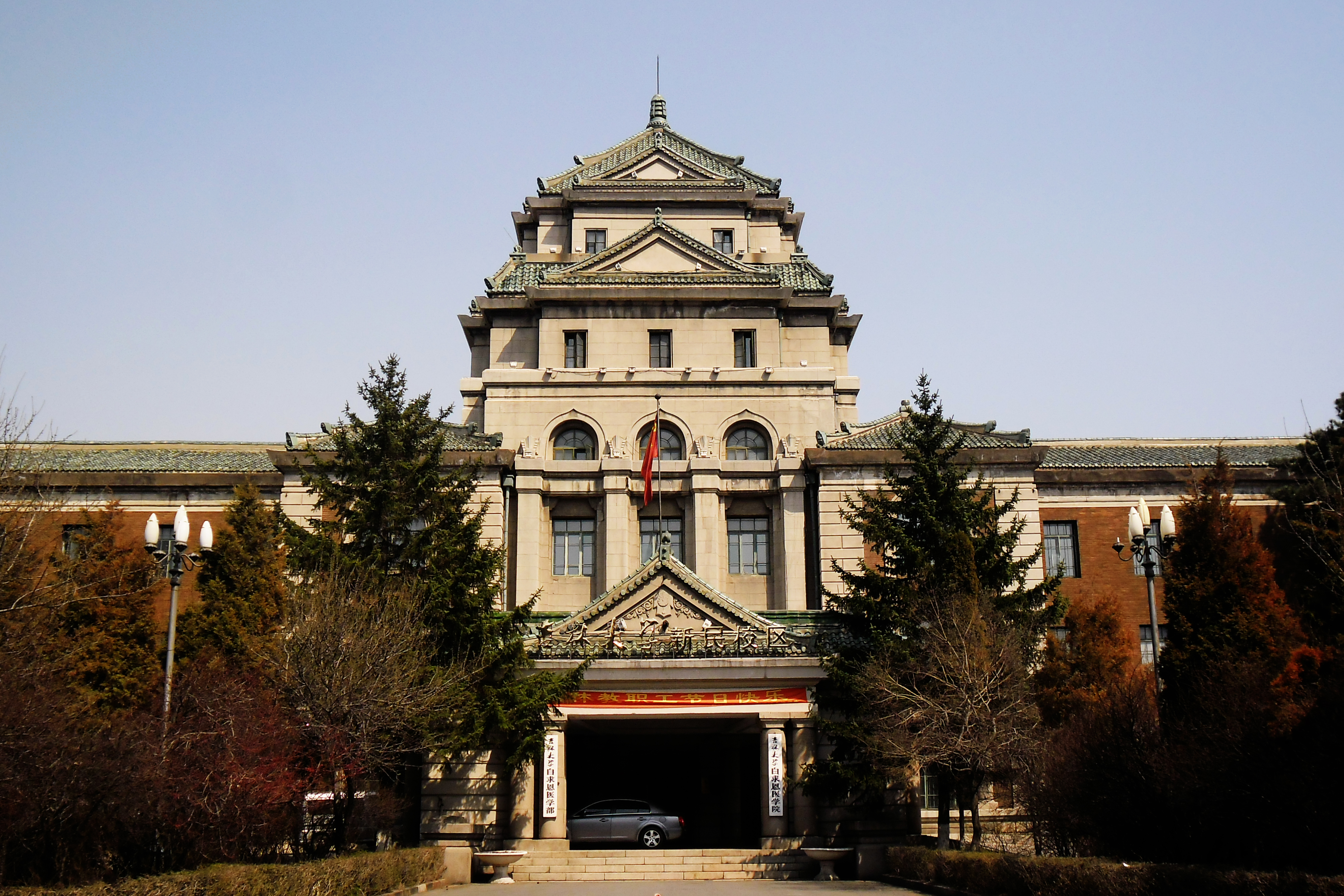
- Norman Bethune Health Science Center of Jilin University, formerly the Ministry of Justice building of Manchukuo.
- Type: Public
- Established: 1939; 87 years ago
- Affiliations: Jilin University
- President: Zhao Guoqing
- Location: Changchun, China
- Campus: Urban
- Website: jdyxb.jlu.edu.cn

Chinese name
- Simplified Chinese: 吉林大学白求恩医学部
- Traditional Chinese: 吉林大學白求恩醫學部
Transcriptions
Standard Mandarin
- Hanyu Pinyin: Jílín Dàxué Báiqiú'ēn Yīxuébù

In January 1938, after arriving at the Jin-Cha-Ji Military Region of the Eighth Route Army, Norman Bethune repeatedly suggested to the region's commander and political commissar, Nie Rongzhen, that a medical school be established to address the shortage of medical personnel in the troops. Subsequently, the Medical Training Team of the Jin-Cha-Ji Military Region's Health Department was established, with Ye Qingshan as its head. (Before that, Commander Nie proposed that Bethune serve as the head, but he politely declined, saying, "I am a doctor; I must go to the front lines to treat the wounded. I cannot be tied down in the rear, but I can do something concrete for the school.")

On September 18, 1939, after intensive preparations, the "Health School of the Jin-Cha-Ji Military Region of the 18th Group Army of the National Revolutionary Army of China" was established, with Jiang Yizhen as its principal. Before and after the school's establishment, Norman Bethune compiled a teaching syllabus and nine textbooks and frequently taught students, providing hands-on guidance and mentorship. In January 1940, the school was renamed Bethune School in memory of Bethune, who died from sepsis contracted by erysipelas while performing surgery on wounded soldiers in November 1939.

In 1946, the school was renamed Bethune Medical University. In 1948, Bethune Medical University merged with the Medical School of Northern University, becoming North China Medical University. In July 1949, it was renamed Tianjin Military Medical University of the Chinese People's Liberation Army. In July 1951, it was renamed the First Military Medical University of the Chinese People's Liberation Army.

In March 1954, the First Military Medical University, based in Tianjin, and the Third Military Medical University, based in Changchun, were merged to form the new First Military Medical University of the Chinese People's Liberation Army, located in Changchun]. In July 1958, the entire institution was transferred to civilian work and renamed Changchun Medical College. In June 1959, it was renamed Jilin Medical University.

In March 1978, it was renamed Bethune Medical University, and was among the eleven medical colleges directly under the Ministry of Health. In 2000, it merged with the former Jilin University, Jilin University of Technology, Changchun University of Science and Technology, and Changchun University of Posts and Telecommunications to form the new Jilin University, under the jurisdiction of the Ministry of Education of the People's Republic of China. At this time, the former Bethune Medical University was renamed the Norman Bethune Health Science Center of Jilin University. On November 2, 2010, Norman Bethune Health Science Center became one of the ten university medical schools (departments, centers) jointly established by the Ministry of Education and the Ministry of Health.

The Norman Bethune Health Science Center of Jilin University has won four scientific awards of National level. The ESI global ranks of Clinical medicine and Pharmacology and Toxicology are among the top 1%. In the year from 1 December 2024 to 30 November 2025, the center altogether published 163 research papers on Nature Index.

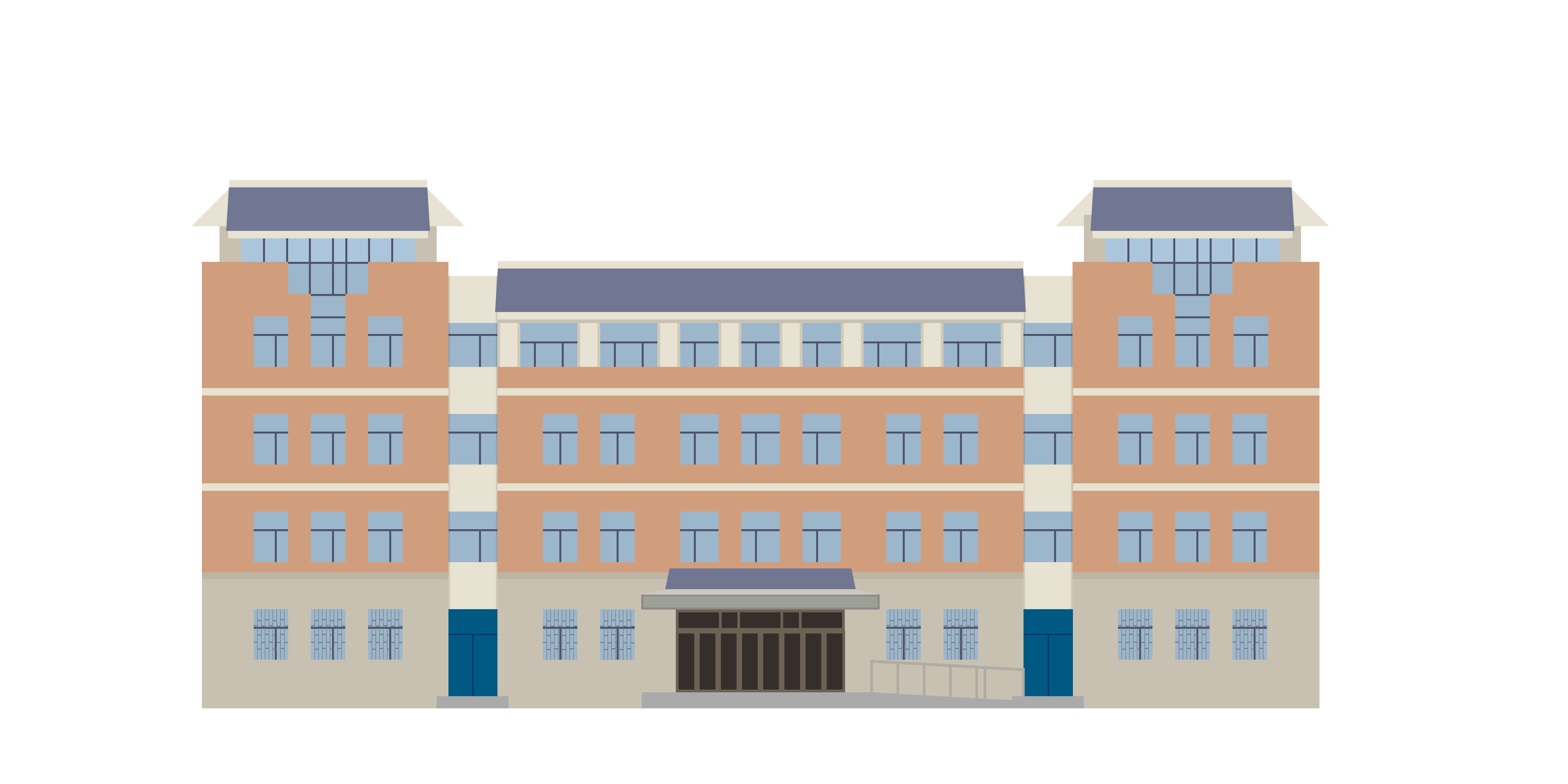
Jilin University Xinmin Campus First Teaching Building

== Academics ==
=== Undergradauate programs ===
The undergraduate programs include Clinical Medicine, Dental Medicine, Preventive Medicine, Radiology, Information Management and System Program (medicine), Pharmacy, Clinical Pharmacy, Bioengineering, Nursing, and Physiotherapy in Rehabilitation Sciences.

=== Schools and hospitals ===
There are four sub-schools:

- School of Basic Medicine
- School of Public Health
- School of Pharmaceutical Science
- School of Nursing

There are four clinical affiliated hospitals (all of the 3A level):

- 1st Hospital of Jilin University
- 2nd Hospital of Jilin University
- China-Japan Union Hospital of Jilin University
- Hospital of Stomatology

In addition, there is one Research Laboratory of Regenerative Science.

=== International cooperation ===
Norman Bethune Health Science Center has academic exchange with institutions from over twenty counties and regions, including Japan, Canada, US, Briton, Sweden and Hong Kong.

== Students ==
There are about 10,000 students, including 5,500 undergraduate students and 4,500 postgraduate students.

== Publications ==
The center runs the following journals (in Chinese):

- 吉林大学学报（医学版） (Journal of Jilin University (Medical Edition), formerly Journal of Bethune Medical University).
- 中风与神经疾病杂志 (Journal of Stroke and Neurological Diseases)
- 临床肝胆病杂志 (Journal of Clinical Hepatobiliary Diseases)
- 中国实验诊断学 (Chinese Journal of Experimental Diagnostics)
- 国际老年医学杂志 (International Journal of Geriatrics)

== See also ==
- Jilin University
- List of medical schools in China
