= Tsinghua University School of Medicine =

Medical school in Beijing, China

- 清华大学医学院
- Type: Public
- Established: 2001; 25 years ago
- President: Huang Tianyin
- Location: Beijing, China
- Campus: Urban
- Affiliations: Tsinghua University
- Website: www.med.tsinghua.edu.cn (English-Chinese bilingual)

Chinese name
- Simplified Chinese: 清华大学医学院
- Traditional Chinese: 清華大學醫學院
Transcriptions
Standard Mandarin
- Hanyu Pinyin: Qīnghuá Dàxué Yīxuéyuàn

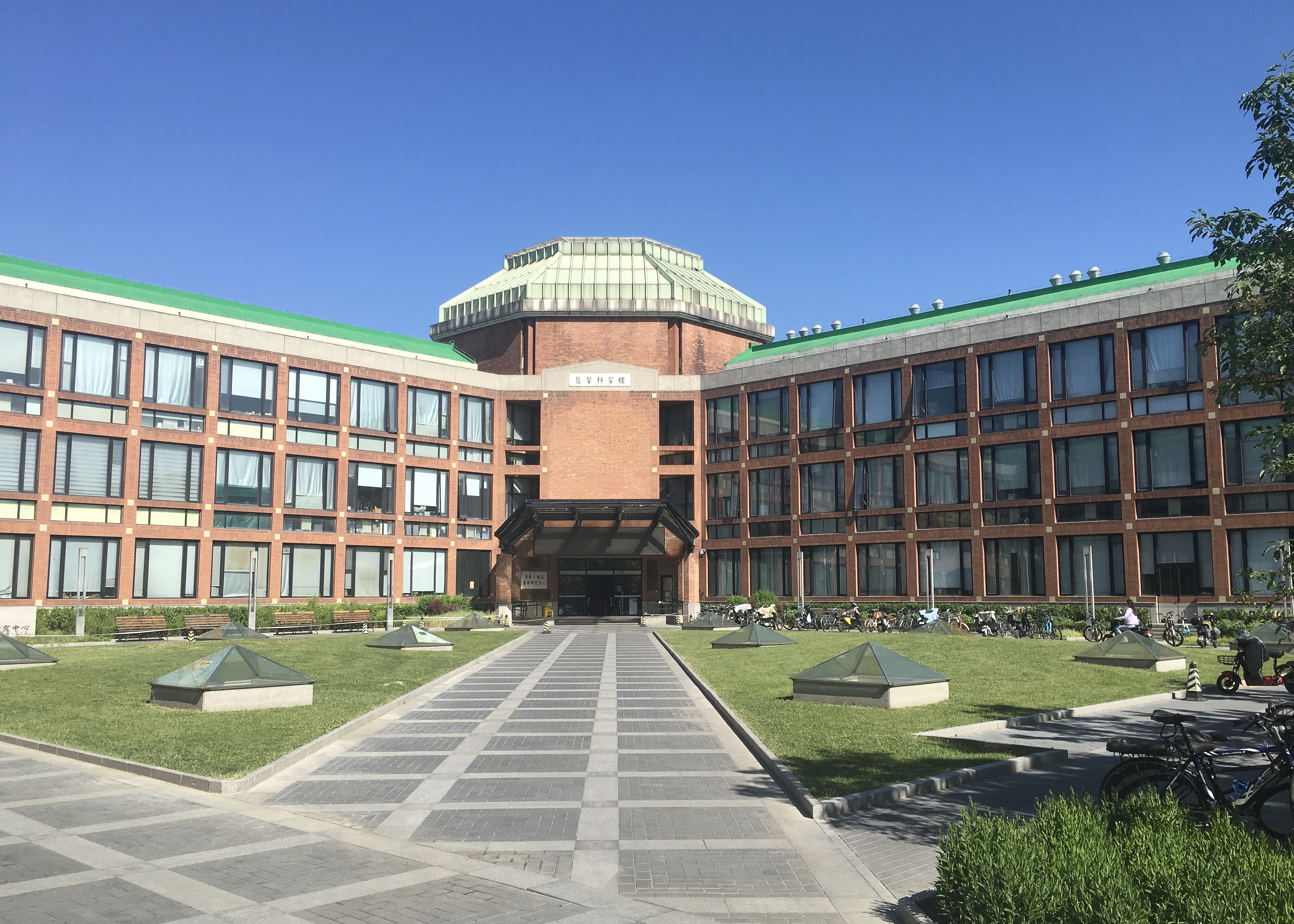
Medical Science Building, where Tsinghua University School of Medicine is located

Tsinghua University School of Medicine, or Tsinghua Medicine, is a college directly under Tsinghua University. It was established in 2001 and its first dean was Wu Jieping.

Tsinghua University School of Medicine consists of five teaching and research institutions and operates four affiliated hospitals. It ranks among the top medical schools in China.

== History ==
On October 25, 2001, Tsinghua University School of Medicine was established, consisting of three departments: Department of Medicine, Department of Pharmacy, and Department of Biomedical Engineering. Professor Wu Jieping, an academician of the Chinese Academy of Sciences and the Chinese Academy of Engineering, served as its first dean. The first class of 61 students was enrolled.

In 2006, China Union Medical University was renamed "Peking Union Medical College", also called "Peking Union Medical College，Tsinghua University". It remained an independent legal entity, and clinical medicine students of Peking Union Medical College received degree certificates from both Peking Union Medical College and Tsinghua University.

in 2009, Tsinghua University School of Medicine began enrolling students in the eight-year clinical medicine program.

In 2010, the Research Center for Public Health was established.

In 2016, the school of clinical medicine was established.

In 2020, the Vanke School of Public Health was established.

In 2023 and 2024, the School of Medicine, Tsinghua University was restructured into the School of Basic Medicine, the School of Biomedical Engineering, the School of Pharmacy, the School of Clinical Medicine, and the Beijing Tsinghua Chang Gung Memorial Hospital, the First Affiliated Hospital of Tsinghua University, and the Yuquan Hospital of Tsinghua University.

== Organization ==
There are five sub-schools, four affiliated hospitals and a number of teaching hospitals.

=== Schools & Institutes ===
==== School of Basic Medical Sciences ====
Formerly known as the Department of Basic Medicine, it was established on November 10, 2012, and changed to its current name in 2024. The School of Basic Medicine was rated A+ in the Times Higher Education China Subject Rating in 2022 and 2023.

==== School of Biomedical Engineering ====
Formerly known as the Department of Biomedical Engineering, it was established on the basis of the biomedical engineering major of the Department of Electrical Engineering founded in 1979 and changed its name to its current name in 2024. On September 20, 2017, Tsinghua University's biomedical engineering major was selected as a "Double First-Class" discipline by the Ministry of Education.

==== School of Clinical Medicine ====
Formerly known as the Department of Clinical Medicine, it was renamed in 2016. From 2001 to 2008, the Department of Clinical Medicine worked closely with Peking Union Medical College to offer an eight-year program. The pre-medical stage (2.5 years) was held at Tsinghua University, while basic medicine and clinical medicine were held at the Union Medical College. Upon completion, students received a doctorate in medicine.

==== School of Pharmaceutical Sciences ====
Formerly known as the Department of Pharmacy, it was established on November 10, 2012 and renamed 'School of Pharmaceutical Sciences" on December 25, 2015.

==== School of Healthcare Management ====
Originally the Tsinghua University Hospital Management Institute, established in 2012 and located within the Tsinghua University Shenzhen International Graduate School, the School of Healthcare Management specializes in hospital management research and cultivates modern hospital management professionals.

=== Affiliated Hospitals ===
==== The First Hospital of Tsinghua University ====
In February 1959, the hospital was established as a direct-affiliated hospital under the Ministry of Information Industry, and was successively known as the General Hospital of Electronics, 401 Hospital, and Beijing Jiuxianqiao Hospital. In 2003, it was transferred to Tsinghua University. The hospital is also called Beijing Huaxin Hospital.

==== Tsinghua University Yuquan Hospital ====
In December 1983, the hospital was established in Shijingshan District as the 402 Hospital, a direct-affiliated hospital under the Ministry of Electronics Industry. In 2003, it was transferred to Tsinghua University. In 2004, it was renamed Tsinghua University Yuquan Hospital. In 2024, it was confirmed as a Class III Grade A hospital.

==== Beijing Tsinghua Changgung Hospital ====
Beijing Tsinghua Chang Gung Memorial Hospital, located in Tiantongyuan, was jointly built and supported by Taiwan Chang Gung Memorial Hospital and Formosa Plastics Group. It officially opened on November 28, 2014. Beijing Tsinghua Changgung Hospital is a non-profit comprehensive public institution jointly managed by both the Beijing Municipal Administration of Hospitals and Tsinghua University.

==== Tsinghua University Affiliated Chuiyangliu Hospital ====
Also known as Beijing Chuiyangliu Hospital, it was established in 1973 and became an affiliated hospital of Tsinghua University in 2012.

=== Teaching Hospitals ===
- Peking Union Medical College Hospital
- Chinese People's Liberation Army General Hospital (301 Hospital)
- Beijing Hospital
- China-Japan Friendship Hospital
- Beijing Jishuitan Hospital
- Beijing Institute of Neurosurgery (Department of Neurosurgery, Tiantan Hospital)

== Performance and Ranking ==
- Nature Index (1 May 2024 - 30 April 2025), Overall 32 articles.
- World University Rankings by Subject 2025: Medical and Health, #15 globally

== Famous People ==
- Wu Jieping
- Shi Yigong

== See also ==
- Peking Union Medical College
- Peking University Health Science Center
- List of medical schools in China
