= Lanzhou University Health Science Center =

Medical school in Lanzhou, China

Lanzhou University Health Science Center (simplified Chinese: 兰州大学医学院; traditional Chinese: 蘭州大學醫學院), or "School of Medicine, LZU", is the medical school of Lanzhou University in Lanzhou City, capital of Gansu Province in Northwest China. Started in 1932, it has developed into a top medical institution in Gansu, integrating medical teaching, research and treatment.

== History ==
In 1932, the Gansu College Medical Special Training School was founded, pioneering modern medical education in Northwest China.

In 1942, the school was developed into the "National Northwest Medical College".

In 1945, the school merged into the National Northwest Medical College and became its Lanzhou Branch.

In 1946, with the founding of the National Lanzhou University, the branch school became "College of Medicine, National Lanzhou University".

In 1949, the school was renamed "College of Medicine, Lanzhou University".

In 1954, the school became independent and renamed "Lanzhou Medical College".

In 2004, the school merged back into Lanzhou University and became Lanzhou University Faculty of Medicine. Its two affiliated hospitals were both top hospitals in Gansu Province.

In 2014, the School of Medicine of Lanzhou University was established.

In 2019, the school was renamed "Lanzhou University Health Science Center".

In 2023, the school received 5 (out of 9) first prizes in the 2023 Gansu Medical Science and Technology Awards.

== Programs ==
Lanzhou University Health Science Center offers degree programs at both undergraduate and postgraduate levels, including "Bachelor of Medicine" (5 years).

In addition to clinical medicine, there are programs in nursing, public health, pharmacy, dentistry, and traditional Chinese medicine.

== Affiliated hospitals ==
The hospitals affiliated to Lanzhou University Health Science Center include

- First Hospital of Lanzhou University (Address: 1 Donggang West Road, Chengguan District, Lanzhou, Gansu Province),
- Second Hospital of Lanzhou University (Address: 82 Cuiying Gate, Chengguan District, Lanzhou, Gansu Province),
- Stomatological Hospital of Lanzhou University,
- Gansu Provincial People's Hospital.

All are Grade A tertiary hospitals, with a total of 9,691 beds.

== Other information ==
Currently, Lanzhou University Health Science Center has 13,679 faculty and staff members, including 13,257 in affiliated hospitals.

In 2024, there were 7.045 million outpatient and emergency visits, 457,600 inpatient admissions, and 227,800 surgeries.

There are 10,423 medical students enrolled, including 5,725 undergraduates, 3,239 master's students, and 1,459 doctoral students.

In academic research, the school published 43 papers listed in Nature Index for the Time frame of 1 May 2025 - 30 April 2026, including 32 in Health sciences. Three disciplines—Clinical Medicine, Pharmacology & Toxicology, and Molecular Biology & Genetics—are ranked in the top 1% of ESI global influence.

The Center hosts the Journal of Lanzhou University (Medical Sciences), Chinese version.

Contact Address: No. 199, Donggang West Road, Chengguan District, Lanzhou City, Gansu Province, 730000, China.

== See also ==
- Lanzhou University
- List of medical schools in China
