= SUSTech School of Medicine =

Medical school in Shenzhen, China

The SUSTech School of Medicine (Chinese: 南方科技大学医学院), or "SUSTech-KCL School of Medicine", is the medical school of Southern University of Science and Technology (SUSTech) in Shenzhen of south China. Jointly established in 2021 by the SUSTech and King's College London (KCL), the school is already quite strong in medical research and practice.

== History ==
In July 2016, the SUSTech signed a two-year (2016 - 2018) collaborative agreement with the Johns Hopkins University School of Medicine for advice on the planning of a medical school in Shenzhen. In August, Professor Jian ZHANG was put in charge of the preparatory work for the establishment of the medical school.

In May 2018, the "Xili People's Hospital" in Nanshan District of Shenzhen was renamed "Southern University of Science and Technology Hospital". In November, the Shenzhen People's Hospital and Shenzhen Third People's Hospital joined SUSTech as its affiliated hospitals.

In 2019, Professor Mingzhao Xing became the first dean of the medical school. SUSTech signed an agreement with King's College London to jointly build the medical school. The new school would feature integrating science and engineering with medicine.

In 2021, with the official approval by the Chinese Ministry of Education, the SUSTech-KCL School of Medicine was jointly established in Shenzhen by the Southern University of Science and Technology and King's College London. It was the first Sino-British medical school built in China. The clinical medicine programs allow students to receive a degree from King's College London without requiring any period of study abroad in the United Kingdom, in addition to a Bachelor of Medicine from SUSTech.

In 2023, Wang Songling, academician of the Chinese Academy of Sciences, was appointed dean of the school.

In 2024, the school welcomed its first cohort of students. The programs were in Biomedical Engineering and Biomedical Sciences. The top 20% students of the programs would enjoy direct admission to postgraduate programs at King’s College London.

In 2025, the Affiliated Women's and Children's Hospital was opened.

== Programs ==
SUSTech School of Medicine offers both undergraduate and postgraduate programs for the students. There are undergraduate programs in Clinical Medicine, Stomatology and Biomedical Sciences; and master and doctoral programs in Clinical Medicine and Biology. The curriculum combines basic sciences with clinical practice and includes small-class instruction and problem-based learning.

== Affiliated hospitals ==
The affiliated hospitals of the SUSTech School of Medicine include:

- Southern University of Science and Technology Hospital (short name: SUSTech Hospital),
- The First Affiliated Hospital of SUSTech (also called "Shenzhen People's Hospital"),
- The Second Affiliated Hospital of SUSTech (also called "Shenzhen Third People's Hospital"),
- SUSTech Stomatology Hospital,
- SUSTech Affiliated Cancer Hospital,
- SUSTech Affiliated Fuwai Shenzhen Hospital,
- SUSTech Affiliated Women and Children Hospital,
- SUSTech Affiliated Foshan Hospital,
- SUSTech Affiliated Longhua Hospital,
- SUSTech Affiliated Mental Health Center.

== Other information ==
In academic research, the SUSTech School of Medicine published 87 papers listed in Nature Index for the time period of 1 May 2025 - 30 April 2026, including 74 in health sciences.

Under the Medical Training (Prioritisation) Act 2026, SUSTech-KCL graduates are relegated to the international reserve list for UK Foundation Programme as they complete the majority of their training outside the British Isles, though they may be offered remaining positions if the reserve list is not filled after all prioritized applicants have been placed.

The Southern University of Science and Technology School of Medicine construction project is scheduled for completion in 2026, with a planned enrollment of 2,000 students. It is located in Nanshan District, Shenzhen, covering an area of approximately 63,600 square meters and a building area of approximately 164,000 square meters. The campus includes an administration building, a principal investigator laboratory building, an animal laboratory building, teaching and research buildings, four student dormitories, and a supporting canteen.

== See also ==
- Southern University of Science and Technology
- King's College London
- List of medical schools in China
