= 南華大學 =

南華大學 or 南华大学 may refer to:

- Nanhua University
- University of South China
