= GIBH =

Research institute in China

Guangzhou Institutes of Biomedicine and Health (GIBH)，Chinese Academy of Sciences
- 中国科学院广州生物医药与健康研究院
- Director: Duanqing Pei （裴端卿）
- Location: Guangzhou, Guangdong, People's Republic of China
- Website: GIBH

Guangzhou Institutes of Biomedicine and Health (GIBH), (simplified Chinese: 中国科学院广州生物医药与健康研究院; traditional Chinese: 中國科學院廣州生物醫藥與健康研究院; pinyin: Zhōngguó Kēxué yuan guangzhou sheng wu yi yao yu jian kang yan jiu yuan) affiliated with the Chinese Academy of Sciences, is a government-sponsored scientific research institution with independent legal jurisdiction. GIBH was established by the Chinese Academy of Sciences, Guangdong Provincial Government and Guangzhou Municipal Government. The managerial mechanism of GIBH is the responsibility of Director-General, under the authority of the board of trustees.

On July 5, 2003, an agreement of 3-party joint cooperation was signed by Lu Yongxiang (Director-General of Chinese Academy of Sciences), Huang Huahua (Provincial Governor of Guangdong Province) and Zhang Guangning (Mayor of Guangzhou City). Establishment of GIBH was officially initiated in 2004.
