= CINTRA (research laboratory) =

Joint research laboratory

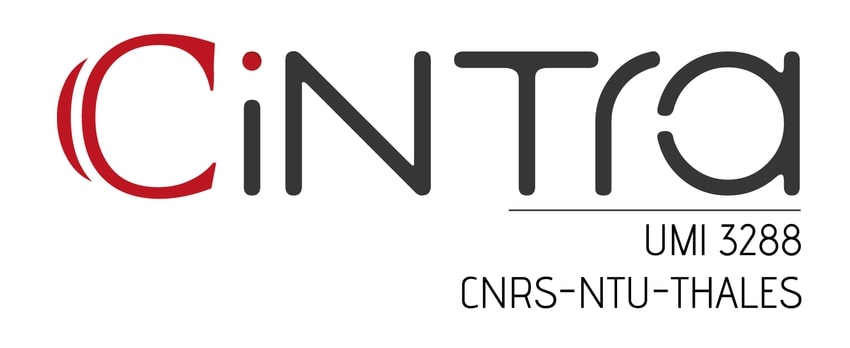
CINTRA logo

CINTRA UMI 3288 is a joint research laboratory between French National Centre for Scientific Research, Nanyang Technological University Singapore and Thales Group. Based on the NTU campus, CINTRA was established in 2009.

== Research Activities ==
CINTRA develops research activities on Nano-electronics and Nano-photonics technologies, with objective to harness the latest in science and technology to develop innovation in these fields. CINTRA is organized in 3 research thrusts:

i) Carbon based materials and devices,

ii) New nanomaterials and structures,

iii) Nanophotonic Technologies.

The applications are related to 3D integration, advanced interconnects, electromagnetic shielding, high frequency applications, thermal management, sensors, energy harvesting and storage, optical communications and optoelectronic devices. Some works are even related with defense applications.

== Affiliated Members ==
As of today, 64 people are affiliated to CINTRA, with a full time equivalent of 43. Through CINTRA, over 50 PhD students and more than 60 student internships have been trained.

== Publications ==
Since its creation CINTRA has produced over 740 publications (as at April 2020) and it is the main contributor for the scientific publications between CNRS and Singapore. In 2020, CINTRA was one of the institutes between CNRS and Singapore which had quite high Nature Index.

== Research and Education Networks ==
Over the years, CINTRA has developed a network of academic collaborations in France with CNRS/University laboratories, and has helped to promote exchanges between France and Singapore researchers: over 80 researchers or students from France and Europe have worked at CINTRA (20 PhD students and over 50 interns among the total PhD and interns trained).
