= Shenzhen University Medical School =

Chinese medical college

- 深圳大学医学部
- Type: Public
- Established: 2008; 18 years ago
- Parent institution: Shenzhen University
- President: Jiang Baoguo
- Location: Shenzhen, China
- Campus: Urban
- Website: med.szu.edu.cn/en

Chinese name
- Simplified Chinese: 深圳大学医学部
- Traditional Chinese: 深圳大學醫學部
Transcriptions
Standard Mandarin
- Hanyu Pinyin: Shēnzhèn Dàxué Yīxuébù

The Shenzhen University Medical School, also called "Shenzhen University College of Medicine" or "Shenzhen University Health Science Center", is the medical school of Shenzhen University in Shenzhen of south China. Established in 2008 as the first medical education institution in Shenzhen, the school is now quite strong in medical research and practice.

== History ==
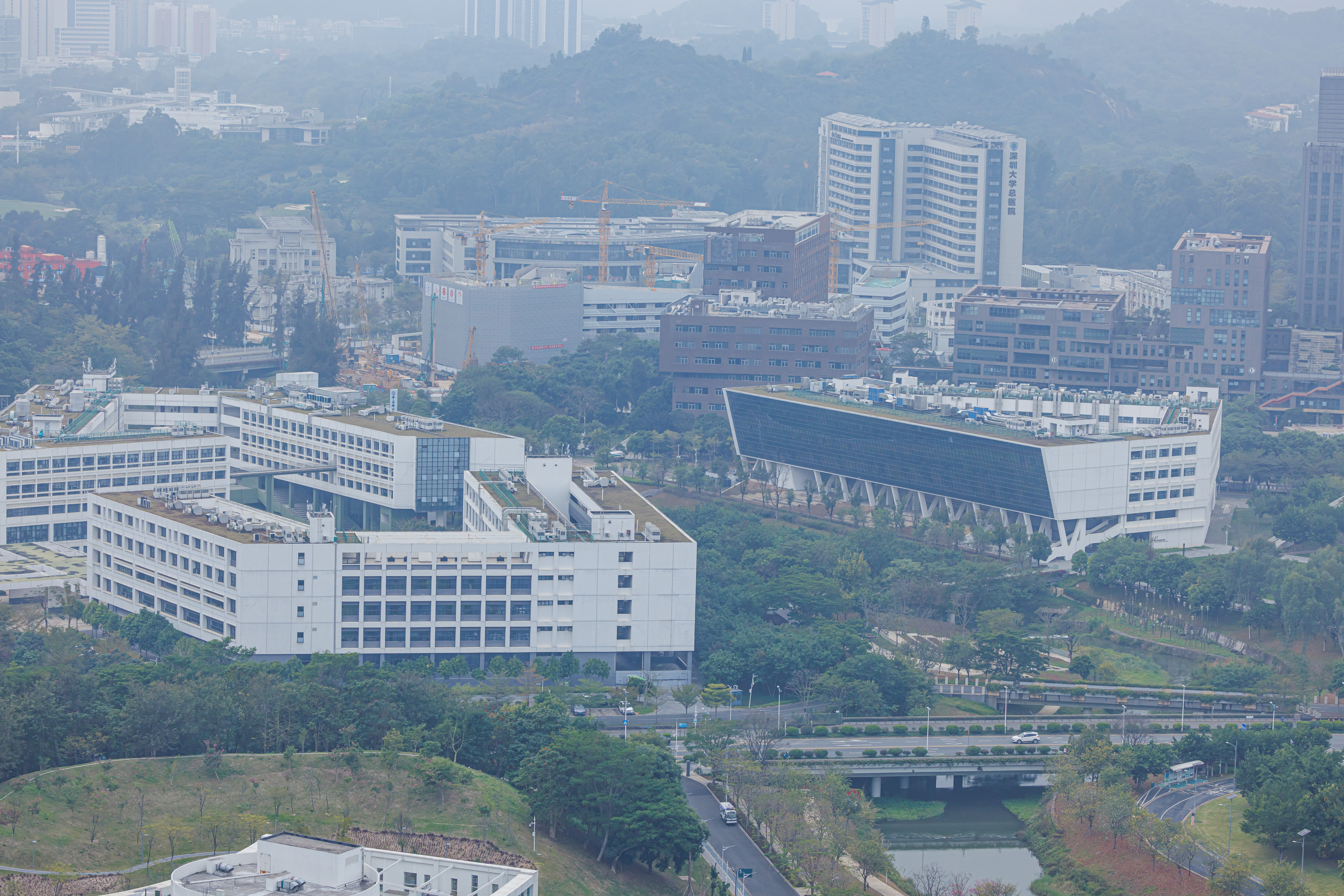
Shenzhen University School of Medicine Building Complex

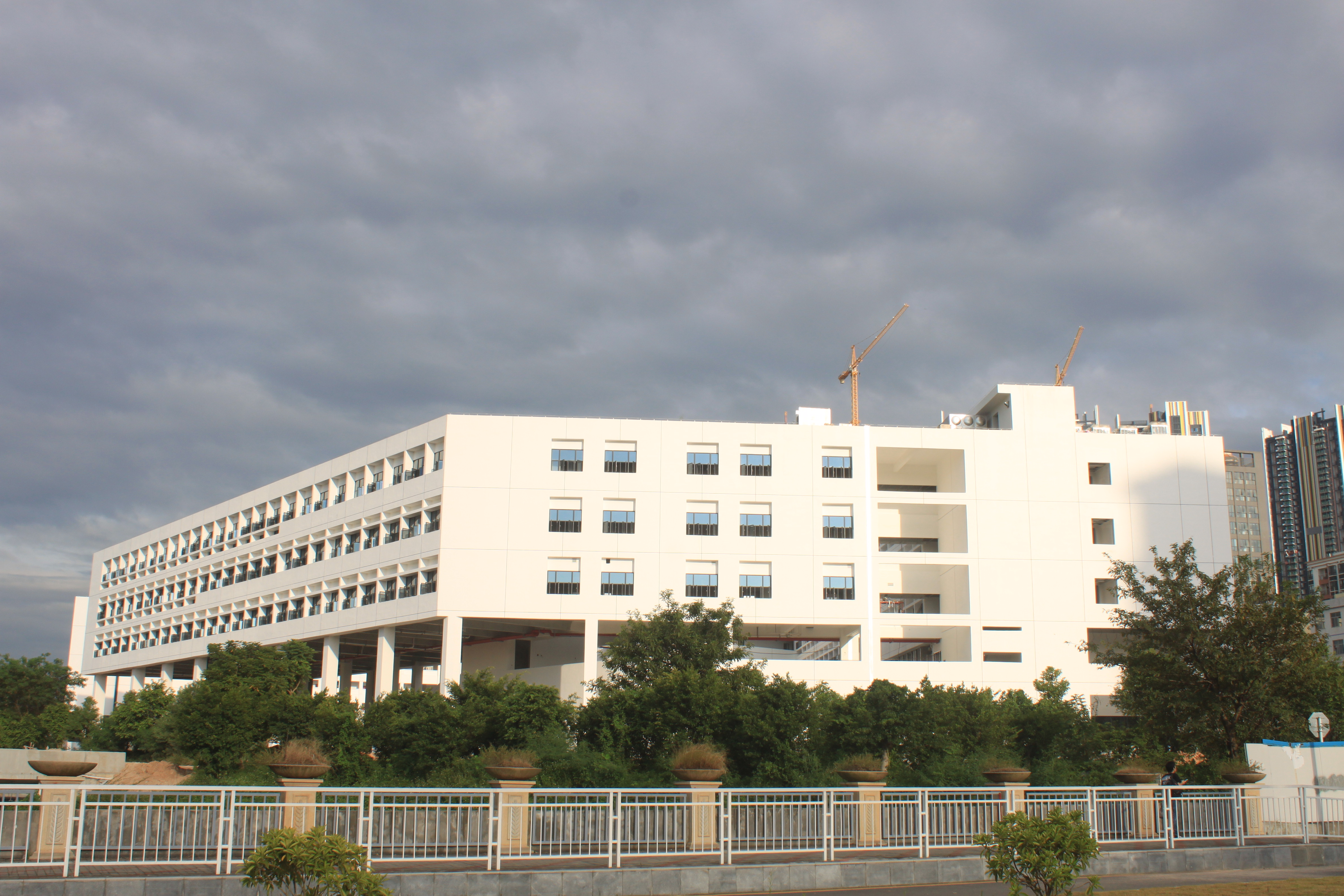
Shouxian Building (A1 Medical and Health Building), Lihu Campus, Shenzhen University

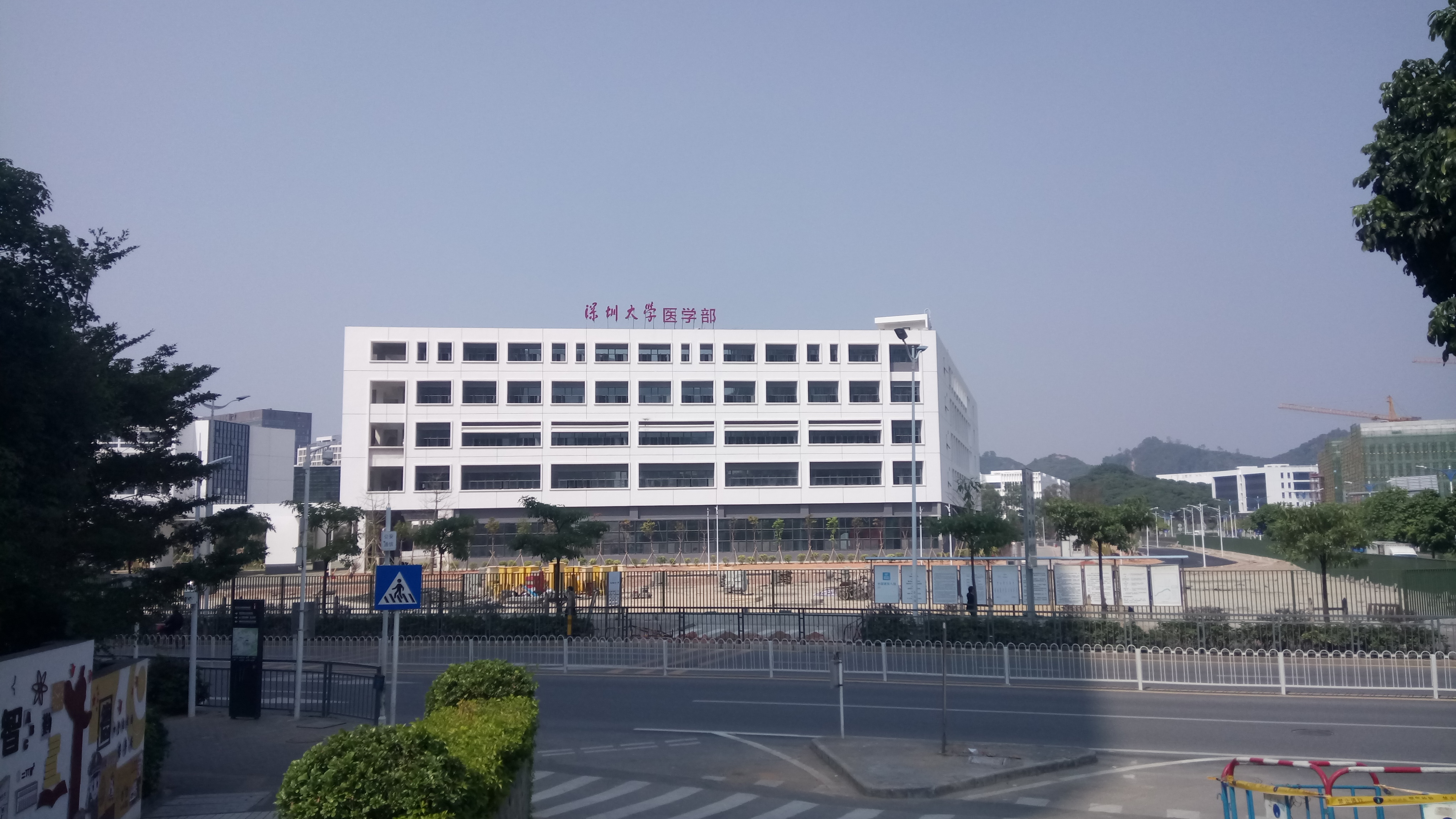
Shoudao Building (A2 Biomedical Engineering Building), Lihu Campus, Shenzhen University

In 2008, the undergraduate program Clinical Medicine was approved and the medical school was established, it was the first medical school in Shenzhen. And Zhong Nanshan was the honorary dean.

In 2013, the Chinese name of the School "深圳大学医学院" was changed to "深圳大学医学部", which can be alternatively translated to English "Shenzhen University Health Science Center" in addition to "Shenzhen University Medical School".

In June 2015, the School of Basic Medical Sciences and the School of Biomedical Engineering were established.

In March 2016, the School of Nursing was established; In May, the clinical medicine discipline of Shenzhen University entered the top 1% of the ESI rankings globally.

In February 2017, the School of Medicine was relocated to the Xili Campus (now Lihu Campus) of Shenzhen University.

In 2018, Shenzhen University General Hospital opened. And the School of Public Health was established.

In September 2020, the Department of General Practice was established.

In 2024, the medical school was approved to establish a first-level doctoral program in Basic Medical Sciences, a master's program in Clinical Medicine, and a professional master's program in Stomatology.

== Programs ==
Shenzhen University Medical School offers both undergraduate and postgraduate programs for the students, including Bachelor of Medicine (five years), Biomedical Engineering, Pharmacy, Nursing, Dental Medicine, and Preventive Medicine.

Normally, the program degrees awarded by this school is acceptable in Canada and the United States.

== Affiliated hospitals ==
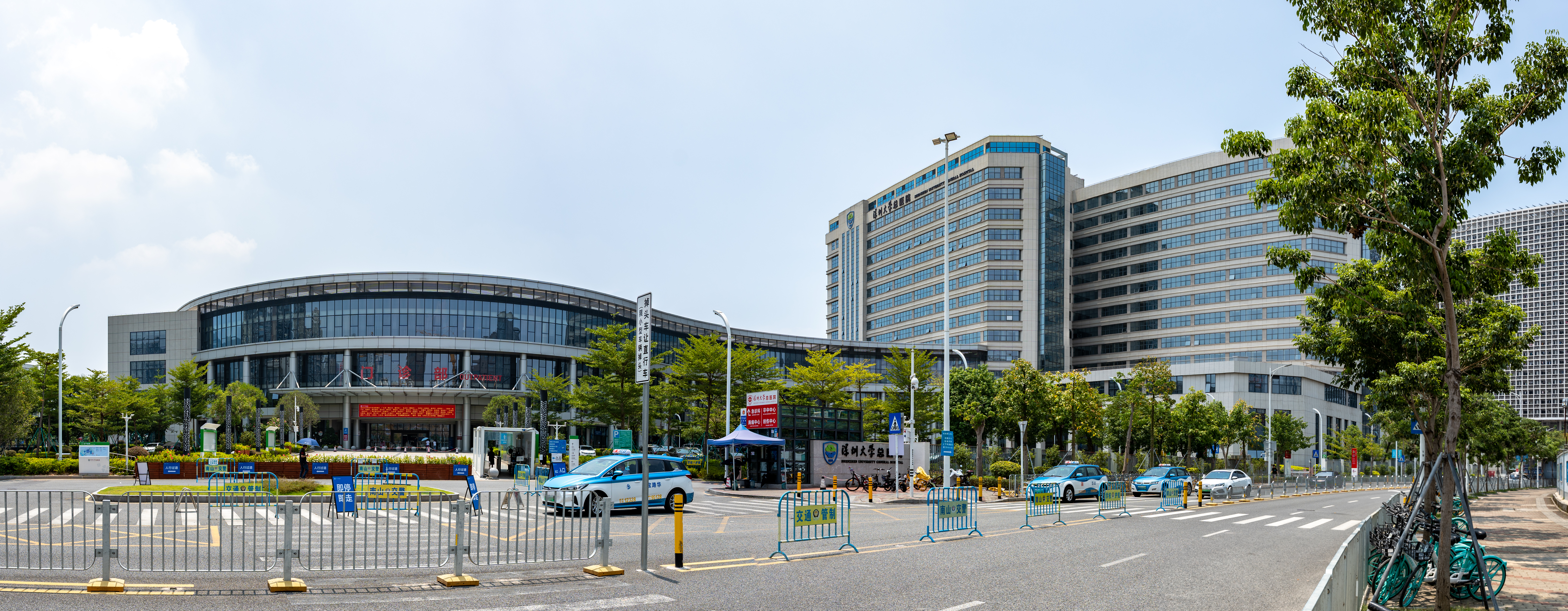
Shenzhen University General Hospital

There are three affiliated hospitals and nineteen teaching hospitals, including

- The First Affiliated Hospital of Shenzhen University (also called "Shenzhen Second People’s Hospital"),
- Shenzhen University General Hospital (formerly known as the "Xue Fu Hospital"),
- Shenzhen University South China Hospital (or Pinghu Hospital).

In addition, there are Shenzhen University Nanshan Hospital, Shenzhen Bao'an People's Hospital, Shenzhen Luohu People’s Hospital and Zhongshan City People's Hospital.

== Distinguished scholars ==
There are quite a number of famous scholars, including

Barry Marshall: Chair Professor of Shenzhen University, Director of the Marshall Biomedical Engineering Laboratory of Shenzhen University, Nobel Prize laureate, Foreign Academician of the Chinese Academy of Engineering.

Jiang Baoguo: Bone scientist, dean of the Shenzhen University Medical School, President of Shenzhen University General Hospital, Chair Professor of the School of Basic Medical Sciences and the General Hospital, former President of Peking University People's Hospital, Academician of the Chinese Academy of Engineering, recipient of the National Science Fund for Distinguished Young Scholars.

Zhang Xueji: Chemical and biological sensing expert, former Vice President of Shenzhen University, Chair Professor of the School of Biomedical Engineering, Fellow of the American Academy of Medical and Biological Engineering, Fellow of the Royal Society of Chemistry, Foreign Academician of the Russian Academy of Engineering.

Cai Zhiming: Urology expert, Director of the Institute of Urology and Reproductive Medicine of Shenzhen University, former President of the Second People's Hospital of Shenzhen, Academician of the European Academy of Sciences, Academician of the American Academy of Medical and Biological Engineering.

== Other information ==
As of 2026, the school has 5,020 students enrolled. There are 570 faculty members. The School hosts the National Center for Molecular Drug Innovation and a Nobel Prize laboratory.

From 2021 to 2025, Shenzhen University Medical School published a total of 12,332 SCI-indexed papers. The School published 137 papers listed in Nature Index for the time period of 1 June 2025 - 30 May 2026, including 83 in health sciences.

In the "QS World University Rankings by Subject: Medicine 2026", Shenzhen University Medical School ranks 29th among the 47 medical schools of China.

The medical school also has built international cooperation with medical institutions in the Uinted States, United Kingdom, Australia, etc.

Contact Address: No. 3688, Nanhai Road, Nanshan District, Shenzhen, Guangdong, China.

== See also ==
- Shenzhen University
- List of medical schools in China
