= University of Medicine =

University of Medicine may refer to:

== Myanmar ==
- University of Medicine, Magway
- University of Medicine, Mandalay
- University of Medicine, Taunggyi
- University of Medicine 1, Yangon
- University of Medicine 2, Yangon

== Elsewhere ==
- University of Medicine, Tirana, Albania
- Hubei University of Medicine, Shiyan City, China
- Kyoto Prefectural University of Medicine, Japan
- Oceania University of Medicine, Apia, Samoa
- Pham Ngoc Thach University of Medicine, Ho Chi Minh City, Vietnam
