= Lu Zigui =

Chinese television director

Lu Zigui (1932 - May 3, 2019, Chinese: 卢子贵), a native of Chengdu City, Sichuan, is a Chinese television director.

== Biography ==
Lu joined the Chinese Communist Party in March 1953. From December 1982 to December 1989, he was deputy director and deputy secretary of the Party Group in the Provincial Department of Broadcasting and Television, also serving as deputy editor-in-chief and concurrently as director and party group secretary of Sichuan Television. In January 1990, he was appointed director, Chinese Communist Party Committee Secretary, and editor-in-chief of the Sichuan Radio and Television, where he served until January 1993. From February 1993 to May 1998, Lu Zigui was a Standing Committee Member of the Seventh Committee of the Sichuan branch of the Chinese People's Political Consultative Conference (CPPCC) and Director of the Liaison and Friendship Working Committee. He died at the age of 87 on May 3, 2019, in Sichuan Provincial People's Hospital.
