= Ningbo University Health Science Center =

Medical school in Ningbo, China

Ningbo University Health Science Center (simplified Chinese: 宁波大学医学部; traditional Chinese: 寧波大學醫學部) is the medical school of Ningbo University in Ningbo City, Zhejiang Province of China. Founded in 1998, the school is now a top medical institution in the province, responsible for medical education, research and treatment.

== History ==
In 1998, the Ningbo University Medical School was founded with donations initiated by Dr. John Tang, a Hong Kong medical scientist.

In 2005, the program Master in Internal Medicine was founded.

In 2011, the program Bachelor of Medicine, Bachelor of Surgery (M.B.B.S.) was founded.

In 2018, the PhD program in Clinical Medicine was founded.

In 2022, the school was renamed "Ningbo University Health Science Center".

== Programs ==
Ningbo University Health Science Center offers both undergraduate and postgraduate programs, including Clinical Medicine and MBBS Program.

In addition to medicine, there are programs in nursing, pharmacy, and public health.

== Affiliated hospitals ==
There are six directly affiliated hospitals:

- The Affiliated First Hospital of Ningbo University (formed by merging the former Ningbo First Hospital and the former Affiliated Hospital of Medical School, Ningbo University (Ningbo Third Hospital) in 2023.)
- The Affiliated Lihuili Hospital of Ningbo University
- The Affiliated People's Hospital of Ningbo University
- The Affiliated Women's and Children's Hospital of Ningbo University
- The Affiliated Kangning Hospital of Ningbo University
- The Affiliated Yangming Hospital of Ningbo University

In addition, there are a number of non-directly affiliated hospitals and teaching hospitals.

== Other information ==
As of April 9, 2026, there are 3,313 full-time students: 81 doctoral candidates, 1,040 master's students, and 2,192 undergraduates (including 257 international students).

There are 110 full-time teachers and 3,224 clinical faculty members.

In academic research, Ningbo University Health Science Center published 69 papers listed in Nature Index for the Time frame of 1 May 2025 - 30 April 2026, including 46 in health sciences. The disciplines of Clinical Medicine, Pharmacology and Toxicology, and Biology and Biochemistry are in the top 1% of ESI.

The Center has international academic exchange with many universities, including the Medical University of South Carolina, University of Skövde, University College London, University of Manchester, University of Sydney and the Chinese University of Hong Kong.

Contact Address: Ningbo, Zhejiang, 315211 China.

== See also ==
- Ningbo University
- List of medical schools in China
