= Medical School, UCAS =

Medical school in Beijing, China

Medical School, University of Chinese Academy of Sciences 中国科学院大学医学院
- Type: public school
- Established: 2015-07-24
- Affiliations: University of Chinese Academy of Sciences
- Dean: Tan Weihong
- Location: No. 1, Yanqi Lake East Road, Huairou District, Beijing; Postcode: 101408
- Website: med.ucas.ac.cn

The Medical School, UCAS (Chinese: 中国科学院大学医学院), formerly known as "Cunji School of Medicine" (Chinese: 存济医学院), is the Medical School of the University of Chinese Academy of Sciences (UCAS). Founded in 2015, the school has developed into a top one-third medical school in China, integrating medical education, academic research and health treatment. It is strong in basic medical sciences, and so far, has been enrolling only master's and doctoral postgraduate students.

== History ==
On July 24, 2015, Academician Ding Zhongli, then president of the University of Chinese Academy of Sciences, and Lu Jianming, chairman of the board of directors of Zhejiang Tongce Holding Group Co., Ltd., signed a joint construction agreement, marking the birth of the Cunji School of Medicine of the University of Chinese Academy of Sciences. Tongce Group was to provide long-term financial support for the construction and development of the Cunji School of Medicine, and will first donate to the UCAS Education Foundation to support the construction of the Cunji School of Medicine Building on the Yanqi Lake Campus in Huairou District of Beijing and purchase equipment and facilities for the school.

On November 18, 2018, the first clinical medical school (Chongqing Clinical Medical School) of the University of Chinese Academy of Sciences was established in Chongqing.

In 2019, the Beijing Clinical Medical College of the University of Chinese Academy of Sciences was jointly established by Beijing Hospital and the University of Chinese Academy of Sciences.

On December 25, 2023, Cunji Medical College was renamed the "Medical School, University of Chinese Academy of Sciences (UCAS)".

== Affiliated Hospitals ==
The affiliated hospitals of the medical school include

Beijing Huairou Hospital Affiliated to the University of Chinese Academy of Sciences

North China Hospital of the University of Chinese Academy of Sciences

Cancer Hospital Affiliated to the University of Chinese Academy of Sciences (Zhejiang Cancer Hospital)

Chongqing Hospital, UCAS (also known as Chongqing People's Hospital)

Chongqing Renji Hospital, UCAS (also called the Fifth Chongqing People's Hospital)

Shenzhen Hospital, UCAS （formed by 2 hospitals and 38 community health service centers in the Guangming New District of Shenzhen）

Huamei Hospital, UCAS (also known as Ningbo Second Hospital)

== Other information ==
As of the end of 2024, the medical school had 54 full-time faculty members and had trained a total of 732 master's and doctoral students in basic medical sciences.

In academic research, the Medical School of the University of Chinese Academy of Sciences published 208 papers listed in Nature Index for the time period of 1 May 2025 - 30 April 2026, including 125 in health sciences.

In "QS World University Rankings by Subject: Medicine 2026", the University of Chinese Academy of Sciences (UCAS) ranks 12th out of 47 in China mainland.

Address: No. 1, Yanqi Lake East Road, Huairou District, Beijing, China; Postcode: 101408

== See also ==
- University of the Chinese Academy of Sciences
- List of medical schools in China
