= Medical School of Tianjin University =

Medical school in Tianjin, China

The Medical School of Tianjin University (Chinese: 天津大学医学院), or Tianjin University School of Medicine, is the medical school of Tianjin University located in Tianjin, China. Founded in 2018, the school now has a number of affiliated hospitals and medical centers responsible for medical education, research and treatment. It features a medicine-engineering combination.

== History ==
In 2018, the Tianjin University Division of Medicine was established. More than 100 guests attended the ceremony. An important feature of the division is "combining medicine with engineering".

In 2023, the Division was renamed "Medical School of Tianjin University", with the first-level discipline and major of biomedical engineering transferred to the medical school.

On September 16, 2026, the world's first ISO Standard for single-herb Traditional Chinese Medicine formula granules, i.e., ISO 21756:2026, was published. The development team was led by a professor from Tianjin University medicine.

== Affiliated hospitals ==
There are a number of medical hospitals and centers:

=== Affiliated hospitals ===
- Tianjin University Central Hospital
- Tianjin University Tianjin Hospital
- Tianjin University Haihe Hospital
- Tianjin University Children's Hospital
- Tianjin University Chest Hospital
- Tianjin University TEDA Hospital
- Tianjin University TEDA International Cardiovascular Hospital
- Tianjin University Jinnan Hospital

=== Medical centers ===
- Tianjin University Neurology Medical Center
- Tianjin University Integrated Traditional Chinese and Western Medicine Medical Center
- Tianjin University Aier Eye Hospital
- Tianjin University Convergence Medicine Center
- Tianjin University Psychiatry Center

== Programs ==
The school offers batcher programs in:

- Biomedical Engineering
- Intelligent Medical Engineering,
- Clinical Medicine,
- Brain-Computer Interface

In addition, there are programs for postgraduate and continuing education, with a total of over 1,300 students.

== Other information ==
In academic research, the Medical School of Tianjin University published 23 papers listed in Nature Index for the time period of 1 May 2025 - 30 April 2026, including 18 in health sciences. The school's Clinical Medicine is among the top Essential Science Indicators (ESI) 1% in the world.

The school hosts the National Key Laboratory of Advanced Medical Materials and Devices, and the National Health and Medical Big Data Research Institute.

In the "QS World University Rankings by Subject: Medicine 2026", Tianjin University School of Medicine ranks 651-700th among the 848 medical schools of the world. In EduRank, Tianjin University Medicine ranks 3rd among 19 medical schools in Tiajin.

Address: No. 92, Weijin Road, Nankai District, Tianjin.

== See also ==
- Tianjin University
- List of medical schools in China
