= Duanqing Pei =

Duanqing Pei is a research scientist who specializes in regenerative medicine.

Originally from a small agricultural college in southern China, Pei went on to complete his graduate work at and obtained his PhD from the University of Pennsylvania in 1991 as part of the CUS-BEA class of 1985. He then became a postdoctoral fellow at the University of Michigan before becoming a faculty member at the University of Minnesota School of Medicine in 1996. He joined the medical faculty at Tsinghua University in Beijing, China in 2002 and became the head of the pharmacology department soon after. In 2004, Pei moved to the newly formed Guangzhou Institute of Biomedicine and Health and took on the position of Deputy Director General. In the spring of 2009, he was promoted to Director General. In May 2020, he would join Westlake University as the Chair Professor in the School of Life Sciences, continuing his investigation of cell fate control.

Pei's most notable work is the discovery of vitamin C's effect on the induction of pluripotent stem cells by around 100–1000 fold. He is currently the Chair Professor of the School of Life Sciences at Westlake University.
