= Ningxia Medical University =

Medical school in Yinchuan, Ningxia, China

Coordinates: 38.4146°N 106.2837°E

- 宁夏医科大学
- Former name: Ningxia Medical College
- Type: Public
- Established: 1958; 68 years ago
- Administrative staff: 3,000
- Students: 8,500 (2015)
- Undergraduates: 7,000 (2015)
- Postgraduates: 1,000 (2015)
- Doctoral students: 500 (2015)
- Location: Yinchuan, Ningxia, China
- Campus: Urban
- Website: www.nxmu.edu.cn

Ningxia Medical University (NXMU, Chinese: 宁夏医科大学; pinyin: Níngxià Yīkē Dàxué), previously known as Ningxia Medical College, is a medical school located in Yinchuan City, Ningxia Province, China.

== See also ==
- List of medical schools in China
- List of universities and colleges in Ningxia
