= Xiamen University School of Medicine =

Xiamen University School of Medicine (simplified Chinese: 厦门大学医学院; traditional Chinese: 廈門大學醫學院), officially "School of Medicine, Xiamen University", also called "Xiamen University Medical College", is the medical school of Xiamen University in Xiamen City, Fujian Province of China. Founded in 1996, the school is now a public institution with over ten affiliated hospitals, integrating medical teaching, research and treatment. The First Affiliated Hospital is a leader in organ transplantation in Fujian Province.

== History ==
In 1996, the medical school of Xiamen University was founded.

From 1999 to 2004, the Department of Clinical Medicine, Department of Preventive Medicine, Department of Pharmacology and Department of Basic Medicine were established.

In 2005, Zhongshan Hospital became the first affiliated hospital of Xiamen University.

In 2011, the School of Medicine moved to Xiang'an campus.

In 2012, the school was selected for the Ministry of Education's Excellent Physician Training Program.

In 2017, the Department of Stomatology and the Clinical Medicine Postdoctoral Research Station were established.

In 2021, the Department of Obstetrics and Gynecology and the Department of Pediatrics were established.

In 2022, the Clinical Medicine major was approved as a national first-class major.

In 2025, the Department of Ophthalmology was officially established.

== Affiliated hospitals ==
There are 11 affiliated hospitals and 6 teaching hospitals with world-class medical facilities., including

- Xiang 'an Hospital
- First Affiliated Hospital (founded in 1937, a large 3A hospital of 1,909 beds, and a leader in organ transplantation in Fujian Province).
- Zhongshan Hospital
- Xiamen Eye Center
- Xiamen Cardiovascular Hospital
- Women and Children 's Hospital
- Southeast Affiliated Hospital
- Fuzhou Second Hospital

== Other information ==
The main campus of the medical school covers an area of approximately 100 mu (land).

As of 2026, the school has 800 staff members, 1093 undergraduate students, 895 master's students, 478 doctoral students, and 213 international MBBS students.

The school offers the programs of:

- Program Name: Bachelor of Medicine, Bachelor of Surgery (M.B.B.S.); Year Instruction Began:1996; Curriculum Duration: 5 years; Language of Instruction: English, Chinese.
- Program Name: Bachelor of Medicine, Bachelor of Surgery (M.B.B.S.); Year Instruction Began: 2011; Curriculum Duration: 6 years; Language of Instruction: English.

In addition to MBBS, there are bachelor's degree programs in Clinical Medicine, Traditional Chinese Medicine, Nursing, Stomatology and Basic Medical Sciences. And there are doctoral and master's degree programs, as well as a postdoctoral research station in Clinical Medicine.

In academic research, the school's clinical medicine has been ranked among the top 0.1-0.2% globally in the ESI rankings.

Main campus Address: Xiang'an South Road. Xiang'an District, Xiamen, Fujian Province, China.

== See also ==
- Xiamen University
- List of medical schools in China
