= List of universities and colleges in Ningxia =

The following is List of Universities and Colleges in Ningxia.

Name	Chinese name	Type	Location	Note
North Minzu University	北方民族大学	National (Other)	Yinchuan	
Ningxia University	宁夏大学	Provincial	Yinchuan	Double First Class
Ningxia Medical University	宁夏医科大学	Provincial	Yinchuan	
Ningxia Normal University	宁夏师范学院	Provincial	Guyuan	
Ningxia Institute of Science and Technology	宁夏理工学院	Private	Shizuishan	
Xinhua College, Ningxia University	宁夏大学新华学院	Private	Yinchuan	
Yinchuan Energy Institute	银川能源学院	Private	Yinchuan	
Yinchuan College, China University of Mining and Technology	中国矿业大学银川学院	Private	Yinchuan	
