= Jinan University School of Medicine =

Medical school in Guangzhou, China

The Jinan University School of Medicine (simplified Chinese: 暨南大学医学部; traditional Chinese: 暨南大學醫學部) is the medical school of Jinan University, “the highest institution for overseas Chinese” located in Guangzhou, capital of Guangdong Province in south China. Founded in 1978 as the earliest medical school in China within a comprehensive university, the school has developed into a top public institution in Guangdong Province, integrating medical teaching, research and treatment.

== History ==
In 1978, the Jinan University School of Medicine was founded, enrolling its first cohort of six-year undergraduate students in Clinical Medicine. It was one of the first medical schools founded within comprehensive universities in the People's Republic of China.

In 1984, the school was registered with the World Health Organization (WHO) enabling international graduates to attend the qualification exam for doctors in their home countries.

In 1998, the Department of Nursing was established.

In 2005, the First Clinical Medical College was established.

In 2010, the school won a second prize of National Science and Technology Progress Award for the project "Establishment and Application of New Surgical Treatment Techniques for Kidney Stones and Chronic Renal Failure" by Su Zexuan.

In 2015, the school became a key medical school jointly developed by the Ministry of Education, the Overseas Chinese Affairs Office for the State Council and the National Health and Family Planning Commission.

In 2020, the Clinical Medicine program was selected as one of the first batch of National First-Class Undergraduate Programs.

== Affiliated Hospitals ==
There are 18 hospitals affiliated to Jinan University School of Medicine, including:

- The First Affiliated Hospital of Jinan University (Guangzhou Overseas Chinese Hospital)
- The Fifth Affiliated Hospital of Jinan University (Heyuan Shenhe Hospital)
- The Sixth Affiliated Hospital of Jinan University (Dongguan Eastern Central Hospital)
- Guangzhou Red Cross Hospital Affiliated to Jinan University (Guangzhou Red Cross Hospital)
- The Second Affiliated Hospital of Jinan University (Guangdong Provincial Second People's Hospital)
- Jiangmen Traditional Chinese Medicine Hospital Affiliated to Jinan University (Jiangmen Wuyi Traditional Chinese Medicine Hospital)
- Shunde Hospital Affiliated to Jinan University (Shunde District Second People's Hospital, Foshan)
- Stomatological Hospital Affiliated to Jinan University (Daliang Hospital, Shunde District, Foshan)
- Aier Eye Hospital Affiliated to Jinan University (Aier Eye Hospital Guangzhou, Shenzhen, and Dongguan Branches)
- Suihua Stomatological Hospital of Jinan University (Guangzhou Suihua Stomatological Hospital)

== Other information ==
The school offers programs for undergraduate, postgraduate, and doctoral degrees in areas such as medicine, nursing, dentistry, and public health, including

- Program Name: Clinical Medicine; Year Teaching Began: 1978; Curriculum Duration:5 years; Language of Instruction: English, Chinese
- Program Name: Clinical Medicine (International Students); Year Teaching Began: 1978; Language of Instruction: Chinese

The school has published influential research papers on medical technology, disease prevention, and public health policy, etc. Its kidney transplantation is top in the province. As of March 2023, the university had 17 disciplines ranked in the top 1% globally by ESI, and 9 disciplines ranked in the top 0.5%.

Jinan University School of Medicine hosts the Chinese Journal of Pathophysiology' (Chinese: 中国病理生理杂志), the only comprehensive high-level academic journal of pathophysiology in China, and sponsored by the Chinese Society for Pathophysiology. Founded in March 1985, the journal is now a Chinese Science and Technology Core Journal, indexed by CSCD, Scopus, EBSCO, CA, JST, and WPRIM.

Jinan University was founded in 1906, and is widely honored as “the highest institution for overseas Chinese”. The University is located in Guangzhou, China.

The school's main address: Shi Pai, Guangzhou, Guangdong Province, China.

== See also ==
- Jinan University
- List of medical schools in China

== External linls ==
Jinan University: https://english.jnu.edu.cn/
