= Sichuan Provincial People's Hospital =

Hospital in Chengdu, China

The Sichuan Provincial People's Hispital (Chinese: 四川省人民医院), concurrently known as the Sichuan Provincial Academy of Medical Sciences (四川省医学科学院), is a public Grade A tertiary hospital located in Chengdu, Sichuan, China. It is also an associated teaching hospital of University of Electronic Science and Technology of China.

== History ==
In 1941, the "Sichuan Public Hospital" was founded by the Sichuan Provincial Government and the Medical School of National Central University, which had relocated from Nanjing to Chengdu due to the War of Resistance against Japan.

In 1946, the hospital was renamed "Sichuan Provincial Hospital", and opened at No. 103 Qinglong Street of Chengdu.

In 1952, the hospital was renamed the "Sichuan Provincial People's Hispital".

In 1989, Sichuan Provincial People's Hospital was among the first batch of hospitals to be rated national Grade A tertiary hospitals.

In 2002, the hospital was merged with the "Sichuan Provincial Academy of Medical Sciences", which then became an alternative name of the hospital.

In 2007, the hospital established a clinical transplant center for various organ and cell transplants. It ranked 28th among the over 160 centers in China in 2009.

In 2013, the School of Medicine of the University of Electronic Science and Technology of China (UESTC) was established and Sichuan Provincial People's Hospital became its affiliated hospital.

In 2023, the hospital was ranked 34th in the Fudan List.

In April, 2026, the hospital entered the top A++ tier according to the national performance monitoring for tertiary public hospitals, ranking among the top 1% nationwide.

== Current status ==
At present, the hospital has 18 national key clinical specialties, 4,300 beds and 7,058 employees, including one academician of the Chinese Academy of Sciences. It is also an affiliated hospital of the University of Electronic Science and Technology. The hospital served more than 6.5 million patients and performed 100,000 surgeries in 2024.

In the recent years, the hospital has published 1,000 SCI (Science Citation Index) papers. There are 72 papers listed in the Nature Index for the Time frame of 1 January 2025 - 31 December 2025, ranking 225th globally and 88th in China in healthcare.

The hospital has close cooperation with international prestigious institutions, such as the Harvard Medical School and the University of Utah in the United States, and St Vincent’s Hospital Melbourne in Australia.

Address: No 32 West Section Two of 1st Ring Road, Qingyang District, Chengdu, Sichuan Province, China.

== See also ==
- University of Electronic Science and Technology of China
- List of hospitals in China
