= Institute of Hematology and Blood Diseases Hospital, CAMS & PUMC =

Hospital in Tianjin, China

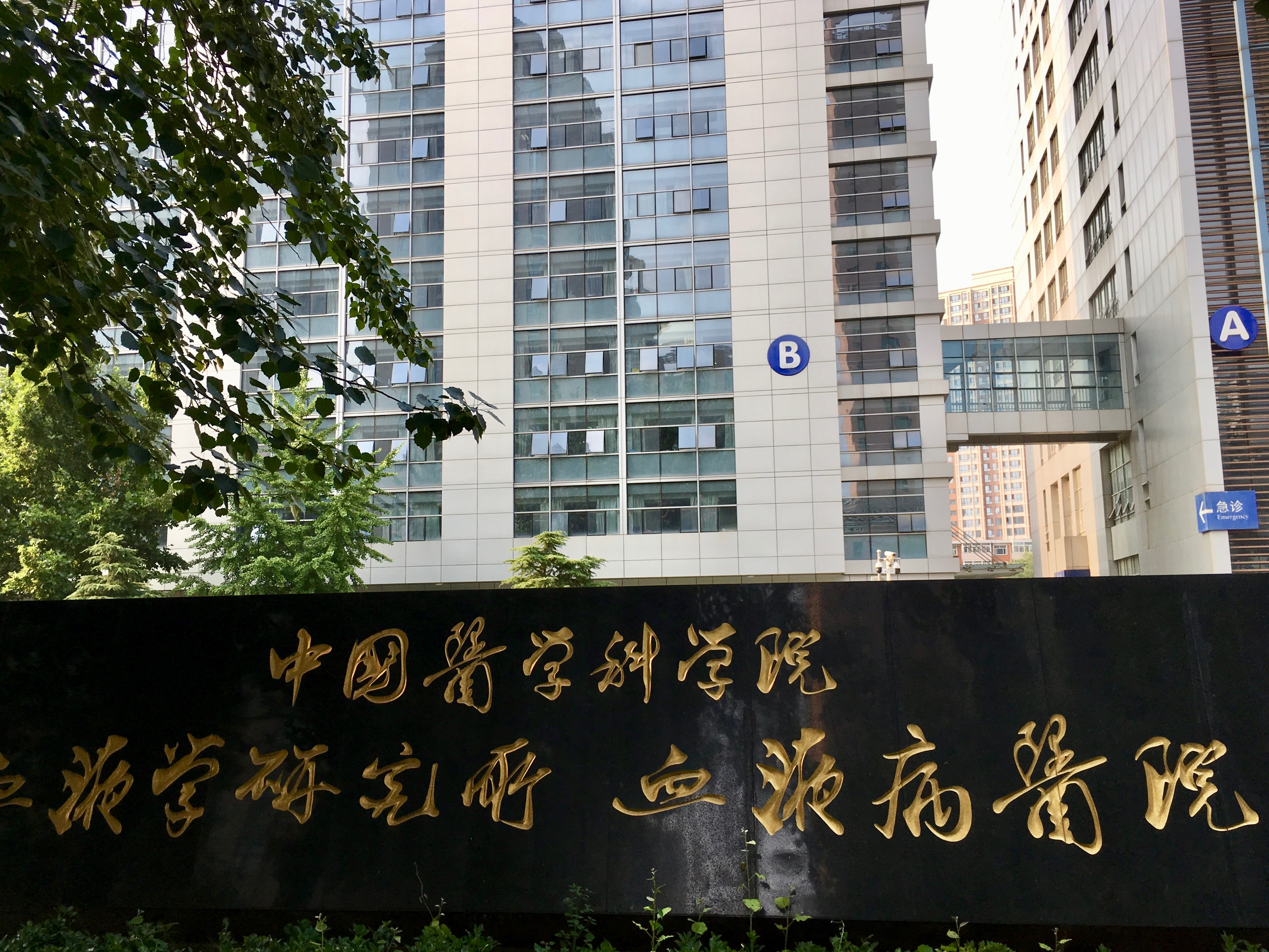
Institute of Hematology and Blood Diseases Hospital, CAMS & PUMC

Institute of Hematology and Blood Diseases Hospital, CAMS & PUMC, operates under a single administrative structure with two official names. It is located at No. 288 Nanjing Road, Heping District, Tianjin. The hospital was founded in November 1957 by Professor Deng Jiadong, the pioneer of hematology in China. In the 1970s, the institution was relocated to Sichuan but returned to Tianjin in 1982. It remains the only tertiary specialized hospital for hematological diseases in China.

It is closely associated with both the Chinese Academy of Medical Sciences and the Peking Union Medical College. As well as fundamental research, it also runs many clinical trials.

Currently, the Hospital of Hematology, Chinese Academy of Medical Sciences, has signed a joint education agreement with Nankai University, adding the designation "Teaching Hospital of Nankai University School of Medicine".

== See also ==
- Peking Union Medical College
