= Chengde Medical University =

Public university in Chengde, Hebei, China

Chengde Medical University (Chinese: 承德医学院; pinyin: Chéngdé Yīxuéyuàn) is a provincial public medical college in Chengde, Hebei, China. It was established in 1956.

== History ==
The College was established in 1945, and adopted its current name in 1982.

Formerly for undergraduates only, the university received authorization to grant master's degrees in 2003. In addition to nursing, many other programs are offered, including psychology, biomedical engineering, and traditional Chinese medicine.

The university's new campus was recently completed on the outskirts of downtown Chengde. It currently enrolls about 6000 students, the majority of which are female. Chengde Medical College is best known for its nursing program, and offers classes in both English and Chinese.

Chengde Medical College began recruiting foreign students in 2006. A number of students from outside China now attend the school, most coming from Pakistan.

The university attaches great importance to international academic exchange and cooperation. Cooperation has been established with universities from Japan, South Korea, Thailand, Russia and Canada.

== Campus ==
The university covers 1,045,400 m^{2}, and its total building area is about 215,000 m^{2}. There is a Muslim dining hall on campus, as well as numerous other dining halls serving different types of food.

== Programs of study ==
There are ten specialties for undergraduates, seven specialties for three years student. There are bachelor's degree programs, Master's degree programs and diploma programs. There are also international student education and continue education. The Clinical College and affiliated hospital undertakes the teaching of clinical medicine courses for 8 bachelor's degree programs and 5 three-year programs. There are 980 clinical faculty members in the university hospital, including 260 professors and associate professors.

=== Bachelor's degree Programs ===
- Clinical Medicine
- Anesthesiology
- Medical Imaging
- Traditional Chinese Medicine,
- Integration of traditional and western clinical medicine
- Nursing
- Nursing (English)
- Chinese Materia Medica
- Applied Psychology

=== Clinical Medicine (MBBS) program for International Students ===
Chengde Medical University started MBBS program for international students in 2006, 12 batches of international student has been graduated from Chengde Medical University, University discontinued International students enrolment due to COVID and started again in 2025. Chengde Medical University international graduate's alumni is one of the best alumni among Chinese Universities.

=== Master's degree Programs ===
- Human Anatomy
- Histology and Embryology
- Chinese Materia Medica
- Oncology
- Pathology and Pathologic Physiology
- Pathogenic Biology

=== Three-year diploma programs ===
- Clinical Medicine
- Nursing
- Nursing (English)
- Anesthesiology
- Medical Imaging
- Medical Engineering
- Computer Technology

== Departments and colleges ==
=== Affiliated hospital and clinical college ===
The affiliated hospital of CDMU was founded in 1949, and its predecessor is the Rehe provincial hospital. After more than 50 years of development, the hospital has become a comprehensive hospital in patient care, medical education, scientific research, and prevention health care. The hospital covers 63,744 m^{2} with total building area of about 94,000 m^{2}. The total fixed assets are estimated at 54 million RMB. There are 1008 beds, 52 medical care and technical departments, and 23 administration offices. There is a staff of 1,268 employees.

The Clinical College and affiliated hospital undertakes the teaching of clinical medicine courses for 8 bachelor's degree programs and 5 three-year programs. There are 980 clinical faculty members in the university hospital, including 260 professors and associate professors.

=== Traditional Chinese Medicine ===
The Department of Traditional Chinese Medicine was established in 1945. With decades of development, it has become a cradle of the talents of traditional Chinese medicine in Hebei province. More than 1500 students have graduated from the Department of Traditional Chinese Medicine. There are 800 resident students and 14 academic members, including 1 professor and 9 associate professors.

Besides teaching, the faculty members engage in scientific research and clinical practice as well. Through combining the theories with clinical practice, they are experienced in the treatment of Glycuresis, kidney diseases, Coronary heart disease, liver disease and Lithiasis.

=== Nursing ===
The Department of Nursing of CDMU was founded in June, 1984 and started to recruit three-year diploma students in July 1985. Authorized by the Hebei Province Education Committee and the State Education Committee, the Nursing Department started to recruit undergraduate student in July 1997. CDMU offered the first three-year, bachelor, and English language nursing programs in Hebei province.

There is a three-year diploma program and a bachelor's degree program for nursing and nursing (English). There are 1581 resident students and 18 nursing academic members, including 1 professor, 6 associate professors, 8 lecturers, and 3 assistants.

=== Biomedical Engineering ===
The Department of Biomedical Engineering provides two diploma programs: Biomedicine Engineering and Practical Computer Technology. The program of Biomedicine Engineering is a three years program, which offers education for students to study and acquire specialized knowledge on the medical instrument and equipment of clinical medicine. The program of Practical Computer Technology is a two-years program. The graduates will work on the management and product development in computer and information industries.

The department has 10 laboratories, including 5 computer rooms, 1 computer hardware laboratory, 3 physical laboratories and 1 electronic laboratory. There are 17 faculty members, including 7 professors, 1 associate professor, 4 lecturers and 5 assistants.

=== Continuing Education ===
The Continuing Education College was founded in September 2001. It mainly deals with adult credential education, self-study examination and continuing medical education. It now has correspondence courses in specialties of clinical medicine, traditional Chinese medicine, nursing, medical test, oral medicine, preclinical medicine and integration of traditional and western medicine. There are part-time education and off-job training options. It also has medical in-service postgraduate courses. By means of various forms, the Continuing Education Department meets the students' and in-service medical staffs' demands of improving and renewing knowledge. At present, the Continuing Education Department has more than 7800 registered students who will acquire adult higher education degrees.

== Research ==
There are seven scientific research institutions: Institute of Chinese Materia Medica, Clinical Medicine Institute, Pre-clinical Medicine Institute, Ophthalmology Institute, Birth Control Institute, Psychological Medicine and Neurology Institute, and Silkworm Research Institute. The Institute of Chinese Materia Medica has the only key lab sanctioned by Hebei Province to promote and expand the study and research of Chinese Materia Medica. It is now focusing and placing major emphasis in the direction of research and development of Chinese herbal medicine.

The university has received recognition for its achievement in scientific research. Since 1998, CDMU has undertaken more than 400 scientific research projects that were over the City level, has acquired more than 30,000,000RMB research funds. Among more than 200 scientific and technological achievements, more than 100 received provincial rewards. There are also 12 patents of invention. Teachers and research fellows have published more than 4000 research papers. There are hundred of academic works published, including more than 30 state-planned textbooks.

== Library ==
Founded in 1944, Chengde Medical University library gradually expanded along with the university's development. The university library provides various services and resources to support the research and educational activities of the university students and staff. The total building area of the university library is 18,473 m^{2}. The library holds 560,100 print books, 157,700 electronic books, 826 kinds of journals, 1,500 kinds of overdue periodicals, and 56 kinds of newspapers. The library also provides various kinds of Medical databases.
