= Hangzhou City University =

University in Hangzhou, China

Coordinates: 30°19′35″N 120°9′3″E

- 浙大城市学院
- Former name: Zhejiang University City College
- Motto: 求是 创新
- Motto in English: Seeking Truth, Pursuing Innovation
- Type: Public, Applied sciences
- Established: July 1999; 27 years ago
- Students: 11,600+
- Location: 51 Huzhou Street, Gongshu District, Hangzhou, Zhejiang, 310015, China
- Campus: 68.4 hectares (169 acres); Urban
- Website: english.hzcu.edu.cn

Hangzhou City University (HZCU) (Chinese: 浙大城市学院; lit. 'ZJU City College'), formerly known as Zhejiang University City College, is a public college in Hangzhou, Zhejiang, China. It was jointly founded as an independent college by Zhejiang University and the Hangzhou Municipal People's Government in 1999. In June 2020, the Hangzhou Municipal Government signed a cooperation agreement with Zhejiang University to support its development.
