= Guangdong Provincial People's Hospital =

Coordinates: 23.1282°N 113.2823°E

Guangdong Provincial People's Hospital 广东省人民医院
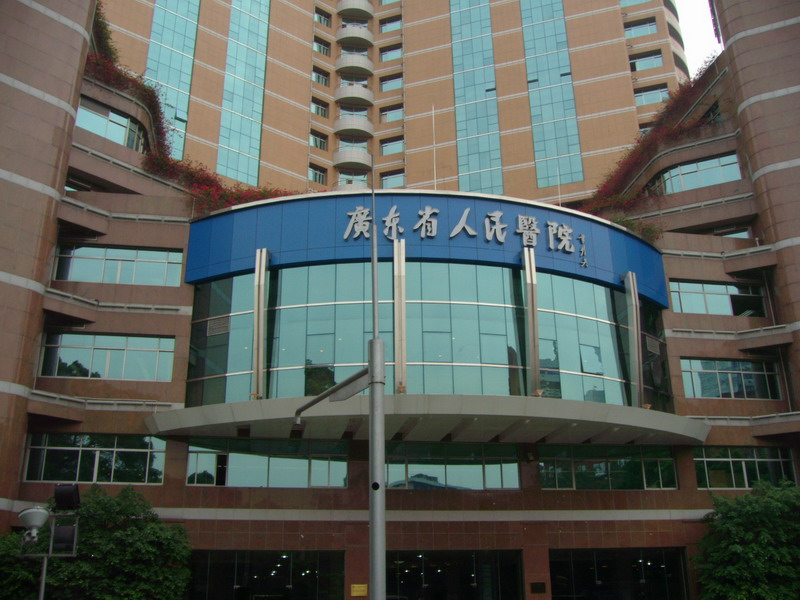
- The main entrance.

Geography
- Location: Guangzhou, Guangdong, China

History
- Founded: 1946

Links
- Website: www.gdghospital.org.cn/en/
- Lists: Hospitals in China

Guangdong Provincial People's Hospital
- Traditional Chinese: 廣東省人民醫院
- Simplified Chinese: 广东省人民医院
Transcriptions
Standard Mandarin
- Hanyu Pinyin: Guǎngdōngshěng Rénmín Yīyuàn
Yue: Cantonese
- Jyutping: gwong2 dung1 saang2 jan4 man4 ji1 jyun2

Guangdong Provincial People's Hospital (Chinese: 广东省人民医院) is a large hospital, founded in 1946, located in Yuexiu District, Guangzhou, Guangdong, China.
