= Shaanxi University of Chinese Medicine =

University in Shaanxi, China

- 陕西中学药大学
- Former names: Northwest Chinese Medicine Training School (西北中医进修学校), Shaanxi College of Chinese Medicine (陕西中医学院)
- Motto: 精诚仁朴
- Motto in English: Sincerity, Benevolence and Simplicity
- Type: Public
- Established: 1952; 74 years ago
- Principal: Zhou Yongxue (周永学)
- Location: Xianyang, Shaanxi, 712046, China; 34°19′05″N 108°44′29″E
- Campus: 1300 acres
- Language: Mandarin
- Website: www.sntcm.edu.cn

Chinese name
- Simplified Chinese: 陕西中医药大学
- Traditional Chinese: 陝西中醫藥大學
Transcriptions
Standard Mandarin
- Hanyu Pinyin: shǎn xī zhōng yī yào dà xué

Shaanxi University of Chinese Medicine is a public medical university based in Xianyang, Shaanxi Province, China.

The university operates two campuses: the North Campus in Xianyang, the historic ancient capital of China, and the South Campus in the West Xi'an New District along the Dan River, with a combined area of approximately 796,675.3 square meters.

Shaanxi University of Chinese Medicine (SUCM) is focused on advancing Traditional Chinese Medicine (TCM), with a mission to preserve China's ancient medical heritage while driving modern innovation.

== History ==
In 1952, the Northwest Chinese Medicine Training School (西北中医进修学校) was founded in Xi'an with approval from the Ministry of Health of the Central People's Government. In 1959, it became Shaanxi College of Chinese Medicine (陕西中医学院). The university relocated to its current campus in Xianyang in 1961. In 2015 the university was formally renamed to the Shaanxi University of Chinese Medicine (陕西中医学院).

Recognized as one of China's premier traditional Chinese medicine institutions, the university was designated as one of the eight key TCM universities by the central government in 1978. The university became one of the first institutions approved by the Academic Degrees Committee of the State Council to grant master's degrees in TCM in 1981.

In 1990, the university became one of the first institutions approved by China's Ministry of Education to admit international students.

In 2019, the university established a partnership with the Grigore T. Popa University of Medicine and Pharmacy (UMF) in Iasi, Romania through an agreement with Shaanxi University of Chinese Medicine, aiming to promote TCM education and cultural exchange.

During the COVID-19 pandemic, the university mobilized over 4,500 medical staff and volunteers to support outbreak response efforts in Wuhan, Shanghai, Inner Mongolia, Xi'an, Xinjiang, and Tibet.

In 2025, Shaanxi University of Chinese Medicine took part in an Arab-China International Forum on Traditional Medicine in Cairo, Egypt.

The university is currently listed under the World Directory of Medical Schools.

== Colleges and departments ==
The university currently has 13 teaching departments

- School of Basic Medical Sciences
- First School of Clinical Medicine (including: Department of Traditional Chinese Medicine, Department of Integrated Traditional Chinese and Western Clinical Medicine)
- Second School of Clinical Medicine (including: Department of Clinical Medicine)
- School of Pharmacy
- School of Continuing Education
- Department of Acupuncture and Tuina (Massage)
- Department of Nursing
- Department of Medical Technology
- Department of Public Health
- Department of Humanities
- Department of English
- Physical Education Department
- Department of Social Sciences

== Affiliated institutions ==
Shaanxi University of Chinese Medicine maintains a network of affiliated institutions, including:

- 4 directly affiliated hospitals
  - Shaanxi University of Chinese Medicine Hospital
  - Shaanxi University of Chinese Medicine - Xixian New District Central Hospital
  - Shaanxi University of Chinese Medicine - Xianyang Central Hospital
  - Shaanxi University of Chinese Medicine - Xianyang First People's Hospital
- 31 non-directly affiliated hospitals
- 1 pharmaceutical manufacturer
- 1 Medical history museum

== Academic journals ==
Established in 1978, the Journal of Shaanxi University of Chinese Medicine (陕西中医药大学学报) is a bimonthly academic journal sponsored by Shaanxi University of Chinese Medicine.

== Transport ==
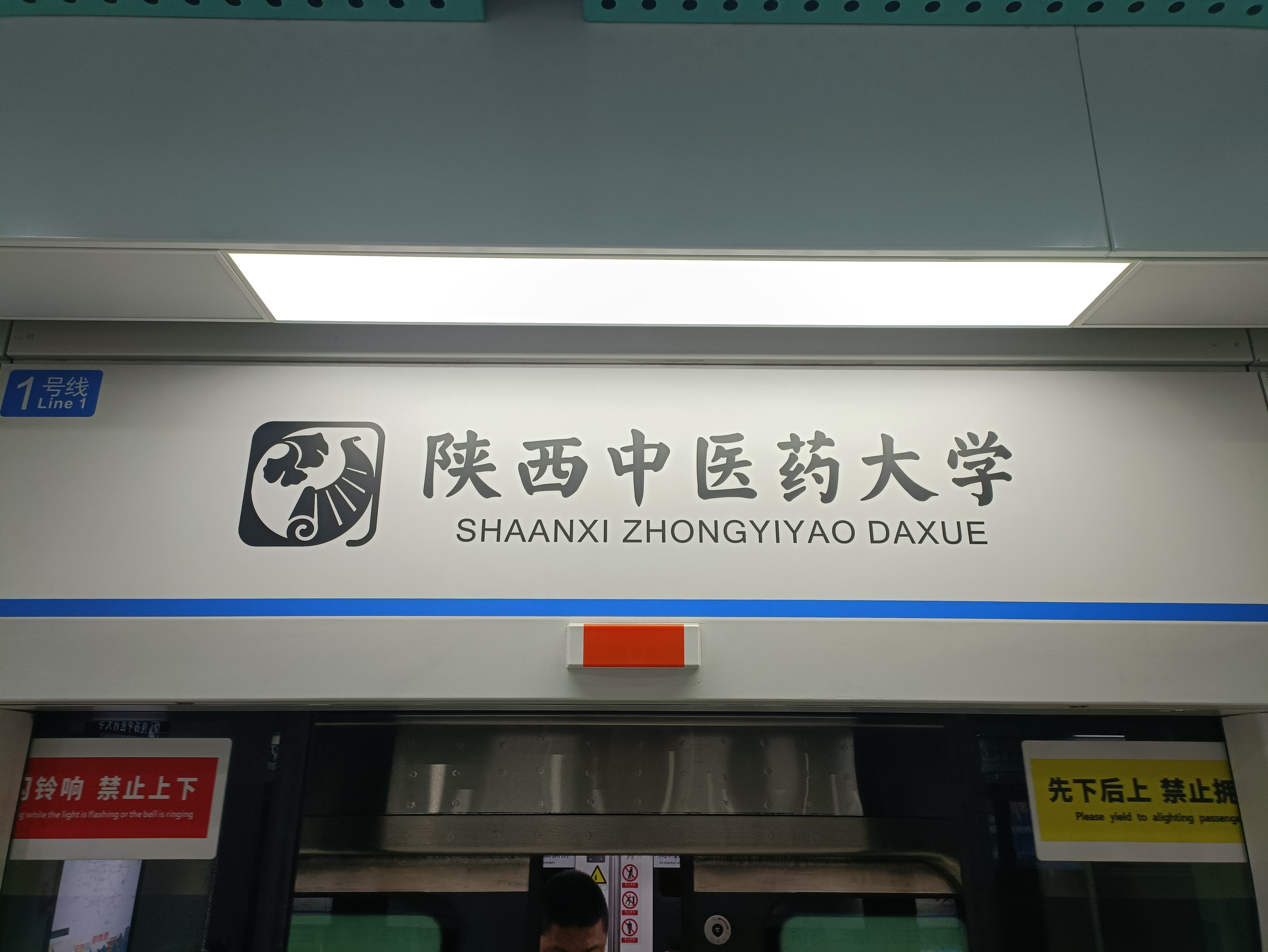

Line 1 of the Xi'an Metro, which opened in 2013, provides direct access to the university's campus via Shaanxi Zhonyiyao Daxue station (陕西中医药大学站).
