= University of South China =

Provincial public university in Hengyang, Hunan, China

- 南华大学
- Former name: Nanhua University
- Type: Public
- Established: 2000; 26 years ago
- President: Zhang Zhuohua (张灼华)
- Academic staff: 1,874 (November 2019)
- Undergraduates: 39,000+ (September 2025)
- Postgraduates: 7,700+ (September 2025)
- Location: Hengyang, Hunan, China; 26°54′17″N 112°35′44″E
- Campus: Urban, 200 ha (490 acres)
- Website: english.usc.edu.cn

Chinese name
- Traditional Chinese: 南華大學
- Simplified Chinese: 南华大学
Transcriptions
Standard Mandarin
- Hanyu Pinyin: Nánhuá Dàxué

The University of South China (USC), formerly known as Nanhua University, is a provincial public university in the city of Hengyang, Hunan, China. It was officially established in March 2000 by a merger of the Zhongnan University of Technology (lit. 'Central South Institute of Technology') and Hengyang Medical College. It is owned by the Hunan Provincial People's Government.

== History ==
The University of South China was formed in 2000 by the merger of Zhongnan University of Technology (lit. 'Central South Institute of Technology', est. 1959) and Hengyang Medical College (est. 1958). The University of South China, with a nationwide enrolment, is administered by the Hunan Provincial Government, and co-funded by the Commission for Science, Technology and Industry for National Defense (COSTIND) and a few other ministries of the central government.

In October 2002, the University of South China incorporated the Sixth Institute of National Nuclear Industry as its subordinating part and took over No. 415 Hospital (originally under the Corporation of National Nuclear Industry) as one of its affiliated hospitals. In July 2004, the Chinese People's Liberation Army (PLA) Navy set up a training base for its reservist officers in University of South China. The University of South China was initially authorized to award bachelor's degrees, and in 1986 began awarding master's degrees. In 1991, it began to collaborate with other universities and research institutes in doctoral programs, and was authorized to award doctoral degrees in 2003.

In 2007, the university changed its English name from Nanhua University to the University of South China (USC).

The university has 72 undergraduate majors, covering as many as 8 disciplinary areas (science, engineering, medicine, law, liberal arts, economics, management, and education). There are 6 provincial key disciplines, 5 disciplines administrated by the Chinese government, and 1 key discipline of national defense. 18 Programs are entitled to award Ph.D. degree, 124 MA or M.S. degrees, and 35 professional degrees. The mining engineering, nuclear technology and its application, pathology and pathological physiology, and pharmacology are Hunan provincial key construction disciplines. There are 2 ministerial key laboratories, i.e. the dissolution and mineral laboratory, the coordinating laboratory of the International Radon Calculation Program of IAEA in Asia, 1 provincial key laboratory, i.e. the radon laboratory. Nuclear science, medical science and environment-related sciences are the three pillar stones of the university.

== Academics ==
=== International collaboration ===
The university began its international student education in 2011, and as of 2021, there were around 600 international students, most of them majoring in basic medicine, clinical medicine, nuclear science and technology, mechanical engineering, civil engineering, software engineering, business management, international economy and trade, and Chinese language.

=== Rankings and reputation ===
As of 2023, the Best Chinese Universities Ranking, also known as the "Shanghai Ranking", placed the university the best in Hengyang, 8th in Hunan and 191st in China. As of 2023, the Academic Ranking of World Universities, also known as ShanghaiRanking, placed the university # 801-900th globally.

The University of South China was ranked 230th in China, 617th in Asia and 1696th globally by the U.S. News & World Report Best Global University Ranking, with its Clinical Medicine subjects ranked at 925th globally. The university ranked 1246th in the world out of nearly 20,000 universities worldwide and 192nd in China by the Center for World University Rankings 2023. The university ranked # 923 in the world out of nearly 30,000 universities worldwide by the University Rankings by Academic Performance 2023–2024.

The University of South China was ranked 401th in Asia, 401th globally among young universities and 1001th in the world among all universities according to the Times Higher Education World University Rankings. It was ranked 1001+ globally in "Engineering and Technology", 1001+ in "Physical Science", 601+ in "Life Science", and 601+ in "Clinical, pre-clinical and Health" by the Times Higher Education Rankings by Subjects.

=== Nature Index ===
Nature Index tracks the affiliations of high-quality scientific articles and presents research outputs by institution and country on a monthly basis.

Year	Rank	Valuer
2022	210	Nature Index - Academic Institutions - China

==== Times Higher Education (THE) ====
Year	Rank	Valuer
2022	70	Times Higher Education Top Universities With Best Student-To-Staff Ratio
2022	401-500	Times Higher Education Asia University Rankings

=== CUAA (Chinese Universities Alumni Association) ===
Universities Ranking of China released by CUAA (Chinese Universities Alumni Association, Chinese: 中国校友会网) is one of the most foremost domestic university rankings in China.

Year	Rank	Valuer
2022	197	CUAA China University Ranking
