= Hubei University of Medicine =

University in Shiyan, Hubei, China

- 湖北医药学院
- Former names: Wuhan Medical College Yunyang School, Tongji Medical University Yunyang College, Yunyang Medical College
- Motto: 厚德、勤学、求实、创新 (Chinese)
- Motto in English: Integrity, Diligence, Veracity and Creativity
- Type: Public
- Established: 1965
- President: He Li
- Faculty: 804
- Undergraduates: 8,194
- Postgraduates: 503
- Location: Shiyan, Hubei, China
- Website: Hubei University of Medicine

The Hubei University of Medicine (HUM, Chinese: 湖北医药学院) is a public university in Shiyan City, Hubei Province, China. Founded in 1965, it was originally known as Wuhan Medical College Yunyang School (武汉医学院郧阳分院). The school was established in a remote mountainous area in northwestern Hubei, and has developed into the premier medical university in the adjacent areas of Hubei, Chongqing, Shaanxi and Henan provinces.

== History ==
=== Wuhan Medical College Yunyang School (1965–1986) ===
The school was founded in 1965 as Wuhan Medical College Yunyang School (武汉医学院郧阳分院), and its first vice president was Dr. Shixiao Xiang (项士孝).

In order to establish the medical school in a remote mountain area in the northwest of Hubei Province, a team of 54 staff members composed of professionals and managers were selected from Wuhan Medical College (武汉医学院). Led by associate professor Shixiao Xiang, the school was first set up in Yun County(郧县), Yunyang, Hubei Province. Classes began in January 1966 with 130 first-year students.

In the spring of 1967, with the construction of the Second Automobile Works and the establishment of the Shiyan City, the school moved to its current location in Shiyan.

=== Tongji Medical University Yunyang College (1986–1994) ===
In 1986, as Wuhan Medical College changed its name to Tongji Medical University, the school was renamed Tongji Medical University Yunyang College (同济医科大学郧阳医学院).

=== Yunyang Medical College (1994–2010) ===
In 1994, the college was renamed to Yunyang Medical College (郧阳医学院), independent from the Tongji Medical University.

In 1998, the college incorporated with Shiyan Health/Medical School and Shiyan Nursing School.

=== Hubei University of Medicine (2010–now) ===
In May 2010, the college was renamed the Hubei University of Medicine.

== Presidents ==
- 1965~1978 Shixiao Xiang (former name: Schi-Hjau Hjiang) (项士孝) (vice-president)
- 1978~1980 Yiting Yang (杨毅亭)
- 1981~1984 Yochun Shen (沈有春)
- 1984~2000 Guiyuan Yang (杨桂元)
- 2000~2007 Tiezhu Huang (黄铁柱)
- 2007~2017 Hanjun Tu (涂汉军)
- 2017~now He Li (李和)

== Schools ==
The university is now composed of 18 schools including Basic Medical Sciences, Clinical, Pharmacy, Nursing etc. HUM emphasizes undergraduate education and is developing graduate, continuing education and collaboration with other universities worldwide.

As of 2021, more than 15,000 students enrolled in the undergraduate programs, including full-time, part-time undergraduate students and continuing education students. The graduate student population is 503.

More than 200 foreign postgraduate and undergraduate students from Nepal, India, Pakistan, Bangladesh, and Tanzania are enrolled in the university.

- School of Basic Medical Sciences
- First Clinical School
- Second Clinical School
- Third Clinical School
- Fourth Clinical School
- Fifth Clinical School
- Sixth Clinical School
- School of Dentistry
- School of Pharmacy
- School of Nursing
- School of Public Administration
- School of Biomedical Engineering
- School of Continuing Education
- Institute of Medicine and Nursing (Independent College)

=== Master's degree program ===
- Clinical Medicine
- General Surgery
- Orthopaedics Surgery
- Paediatrics
- Dermatology
- Radiology
- ENT

== Affiliated Hospitals ==
As of 2021, the university has 6 affiliated hospitals. Three are located in Shiyan, and the rest are located in Xiangyang and Suizhou in Hubei province, and Ankang in Shaanxi province respectively.

- Taihe Hospital
- Dongfeng Hospital
- Shiyan Renmin Hospital
- Xiang Yang No.1 People's Hospital
- Suizhou Central Hospital
- Ankang Central Hospital

== Research laboratories and Institutes ==
- Hubei Key Laboratory of Embryonic Stem Cell Research
- Institute of Basic Medical Science
- Hubei Key Laboratory of Wudang Local Chinese Medicine Research
- Life Sciences Institute
- Clinical Medicine Institute
- Liver Surgery Institute
- Chinese Medicine Herb Pharmacology Laboratory3
