= People's Liberation Army General Hospital and Medical School =

Military hospital system and medical school in Beijing, China

People's Liberation Army General Hospital and Medical School (301 Hospital)
- People's Liberation Army; Joint Logistics Support Force

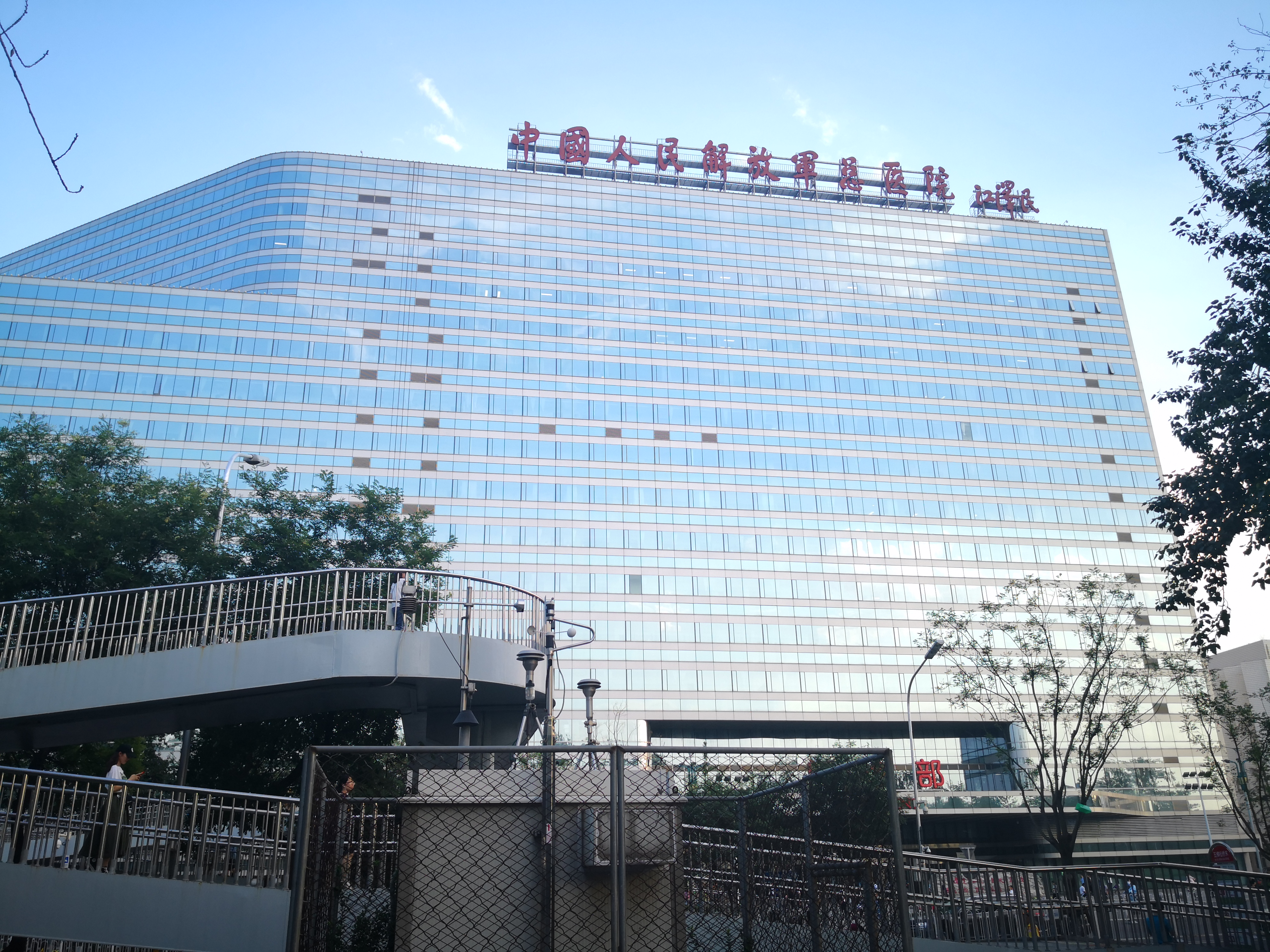

Geography
- Location: 4th Ring Road, Beijing, China
- Coordinates: 39.905312°N 116.271230°E

Organisation
- Type: military, general, teaching

Services
- Beds: 4000

History
- Founded: October 1953

Links
- Lists: Hospitals in China

The People's Liberation Army General Hospital and Medical School, commonly known by its codename 301 Hospital, is a major hospital system and medical school of the People's Liberation Army. It is also the largest military hospital system in China. It operates nine medical centers and five medical zones throughout the municipality of Beijing, as well as a branch hospital in Sanya, Hainan.

The 301 Hospital is administratively affiliated with the People's Liberation Army Joint Logistics Support Force. The hospital's history can be traced back to the Ninggang Maoping Hospital established by the revolutionary army in 1927. The hospital has long been ranked third in China, after Peking Union Hospital and West China Hospital. The hospital is open to the public.

== History ==
The General Hospital was formerly the second clinical institute affiliated to Peking Union Medical College, which was changed in October 1953 into a hospital directly affiliated to the military commission of the Central Committee of the Chinese Communist Party. In July 1954, it was renamed as the 301 Hospital of the PLA. In June 1957, the Department of Defense mandated to cancel the appellation of "301 Hospital", while appointing the name of "the Chinese People's Liberation Army General Hospital". The People's Liberation Army Postgraduate Medical School was constructed with support from the Chinese People's Liberation Army General Hospital. It was founded in November 1958 and closed down in 1962, and in June 1979, it was restored with approval from the military commission. In September 1986, it was formally listed among the universities and colleges of the whole army, with an authorization number.

In 2004, the 304 Hospital and 309 Hospital of the PLA were renamed respectively as the 304 and 309 Clinical Branches, and publicly referred to as the First and the Second Hospitals affiliated to the China PLA General Hospital, meanwhile listed into the compilation sequence of the China PLA General Hospital.
