= Classification of Chinese hospitals =

Within the health system, the Classification of Chinese hospitals is a 3-tier system according to the Ministry of Health of the People's Republic of China. Hospitals are classified in a system that recognizes a hospital's ability to provide medical care, medical education, and conduct medical research. Hospitals are designated as Primary, Secondary or Tertiary hospitals.

1. A primary hospital is typically a township hospital that contains less than 100 beds. They are tasked with providing preventive care, minimal health care and rehabilitation services – i.e. primary care. A primary hospital is similar to community hospitals in the West.
2. A secondary hospital is one that tend to be affiliated with a medium size city, county or district and contain more than 100 beds, but less than 500. They are responsible for providing comprehensive health services, as well as medical education and conducting research on a regional basis. A secondary hospital is similar to a regional hospital or district hospital in the West.
3. A tertiary hospital is a comprehensive, referral, general hospitals at the city, provincial or national level with a bed capacity exceeding 500. They are responsible for providing specialist health services, perform a bigger role with regard to medical education and scientific research and they serve as medical hubs providing care to multiple regions. The tertiary hospital is similar to a Tertiary referral hospital in the West.

Further, based on the level of service provision, size, medical technology, medical equipment, and management and medical quality, these 3 grades are further subdivided into 3 subsidiary levels: A, B and C (甲[jiǎ], 乙[yǐ], 丙[bǐng]). This results in a total of 9 levels. In addition, one special level, 3AAA (三级特等), is reserved for the most specialized hospitals, though no hospitals have yet been placed in this level. This system is hence referred to in Chinese as 三级十等 (sānjí shíděng), 3 Grades and 10 levels.

In 2015, the Ministry of Health's National Health and Family Planning Commission, used the terms community hospital and top level hospital in describing hospital planning.

== History ==
A three-level classification of healthcare is present during the Mao era. The first level consisted of neighborhood, workplace, and village clinics; the second level was city district and village health centers; the final level was city and town-level hospitals.

The current classification took shape in November 1989. There was a long pause on hospital classification between 1998 and 2008, when a new guideline was produced. Hospital classification was officially restarted in 2010.

== Grading ==
A 1000-point system is implemented, with 900 points and above being rated as Grade 3A, 750 points to 900 points as Grade 3B, and 600 points to 750 points as Grade 3C. Hospital grades are not lifelong and are managed dynamically. In addition, the comprehensive medical quality evaluation standards highlight the "patient-centered" service concept and require hospitals to regularly solicit patient opinions and hold patient opinion seminars every quarter. Hospitals must also set up free drinking water supplies, public telephones, implement online and telephone appointment booking for medical treatment, require laboratory test reports to be issued within 24 hours, publicize charging prices, provide cost inquiries, and implement a cost list system.

== Grade A tertiary hospitals ==
Grade-A tertiary hospitals (Chinese: 三级甲等医院; pinyin: sānjí jiǎděng yīyuàn), shortly 3A hospitals (Chinese: 三甲医院; pinyin: sān jiǎ yīyuàn), provide high-level specialized medical and health services to several regions and perform higher education and scientific research tasks.

=== Criteria ===
Grade 3A refers to those who score no less than 900 points (or 90%) according to the grading criteria. The evaluation of Grade A tertiary hospitals is generally carried out by provincial health administrative departments.

Tertiary (Level 3) hospitals (with more than 500 beds) are regional or higher level hospitals that provide high-level specialized medical and health services to several regions and perform higher education and scientific research tasks. The evaluation adheres to emphasis on service, management, quality, safety, foundation, and guarantee, no campaigns, no formalities, and no fraud. Private hospitals can participate in the grade assessment on an equal footing with public hospitals. The main items of assessment include medical services and management, medical quality and safety, technical level and efficiency.

=== Quantity ===
According to statistics in the "Statistical Bulletin on the Development of the National Health Care Industry in 2023" issued by the National Health Commission, as of the end of 2023, there were 1,795 Grade-A tertiary hospitals in China mainland.

As of December 10, 2019, there were 673 3A Western medicine hospitals under the supervision of health commissions at all levels. As of the end of 2022, there were 705 3A Traditional Chinese medicine (TCM) hospitals under the jurisdiction of TCM administration bureaus at all levels, including 571 TCM hospitals, 76 TCM and Western medicine combined hospitals, 24 TCM specialty hospitals, and 34 ethnic minority medicine hospitals. Another type of Grade A tertiary hospitals are the military hospitals affiliated with the People's Liberation Army and the People's Armed Police Force. The information of this type of hospitals has not yet been made public.

== See also ==
- Medicine in China
- List of hospitals in China
- Public hospital § India
