= Nature Index =

Database of international scientific output

- Discipline: Multidisciplinary
- Language: English

Publication details
- History: Since 2014
- Publisher: Springer Nature
- License: CC BY-NC-SA 4.0
- ISO 4: Find out here

Links
- Journal homepage

The Nature Index is a database that tracks institutions and countries/territories and their scientific output since its introduction in November 2014. Originally released with 64 natural-science journals, the Nature Index expanded to 82 natural-science journals in 2018, then added 64 health-science journals in 2023. Each year, the Nature Index ranks the leading institutions (which can be companies, universities, government agencies, research institutes, or NGOs) and countries by the number of scientific articles and papers published in leading journals. This ranking can also be categorized by individual fields of research such as life sciences, chemistry, physics, or earth sciences, with different institutions leading in each. The Nature Index was conceived by Nature Portfolio. In total, more than 17,000 institutions are listed in the Nature Index.

== Methodology ==
The Nature Index attempts to objectively measure the scientific output of institutions and countries, taking into account differences in quality. Therefore, only articles published in 145 selected high-quality journals are counted. These journals were selected by independent committees. If authors from several institutions and/or countries are involved in a scientific article, it is divided accordingly, assuming that all researchers were equally involved in the article. For example, this "fractional count" (Share) received by each author would be 0.1 for an article with 10 authors. If an author is affiliated with more than one institution, that author's Share is then subdivided equally across their affiliated institutions. The process is similar for countries/territories and regions, though the fact that some institutions have overseas labs makes the process more complicated, with such labs being counted towards their appropriate host countries.

== Top institutions ==
The top 25 institutions with the highest share of articles published in scientific journals according to the Nature Index 2026, which is valid for the calendar year 2025:

Rank	Institution	Country	Total share	Count
1	Chinese Academy of Sciences	China	3655.1	12822
2	Zhejiang University	China	1276.85	3213
3	Harvard University	United States	1259.01	4246
4	Tsinghua University	China	1213.59	4062
5	Shanghai Jiao Tong University	China	1191.47	3301
6	University of Science and Technology of China	China	1128.58	3763
7	Peking University	China	1066.49	4264
8	University of the Chinese Academy of Sciences	China	1055.67	5191
9	Nanjing University	China	952.65	2609
10	Sichuan University	China	880.93	1721
11	Fudan University	China	872.5	2662
12	Sun Yat-sen University	China	839.24	2160
13	Max Planck Society	Germany	764.09	3218
14	Stanford University	United States	711.53	2348
15	Xi'an Jiaotong University	China	708.45	1528
16	French National Centre for Scientific Research	France	701.98	5212
17	Huazhong University of Science and Technology (HUST)	China	697.95	1527
18	Helmholtz Association	Germany	682	3406
19	Jilin University	China	651.71	1332
20	Shandong University	China	615.77	1813
21	Massachusetts Institute of Technology	United States	593.59	2418
22	Wuhan University	China	588.25	1342
23	Tianjin University	China	565.88	1792
24	Nankai University	China	560.46	1554
25	Tongji University	China	551.06	1462

== Top countries ==
The table here shows the countries with the highest share of articles published in scientific journals according to the Nature Index 2026, which contains data for the calendar year 2025. The per-capita figures are calculated from the population figures shown in the table.

Rank	Country or territory	Count	Share	Population	Count per ten million people	Share per ten million people
1	China	59472	52735.17	1,409,670,000	422	374.10
2	United States	37995	26006.15	335,893,238	1131	774.24
3	Germany	12483	5827.33	84,607,016	1475	688.75
4	United Kingdom	11955	4819.70	67,596,281	1769	713.01
5	Japan	6869	3890.15	124,000,000	554	313.72
6	France	6855	2850.78	68,394,000	1002	416.82
7	South Korea	4649	2827.28	51,293,934	906	551.19
8	India	3620	2437.38	1,400,744,000	26	17.40
9	Canada	5647	2355.77	40,769,890	1385	577.82
10	Italy	5098	1971.22	58,972,268	864	334.26
11	Australia	5151	1921.36	26,821,557	1920	716.35
12	Spain	4883	1868.02	48,592,909	1005	384.42
13	Switzerland	4568	1766.66	8,960,817	5098	1971.54
14	Netherlands	3964	1452.55	17,967,505	2206	808.43
15	Sweden	3072	1019.30	10,549,287	2912	966.23
16	Singapore	2428	900.40	5,917,600	4103	1521.56
17	Denmark	2258	826.60	5,961,249	3788	1386.62
18	Taiwan	1653	752.29	23,420,442	706	321.21
19	Israel	1583	707.85	9,880,000	1602	716.45
20	Belgium	2059	688.32	11,820,117	1742	582.33
21	Austria	1825	580.12	9,159,993	1992	633.32
22	Brazil	1550	563.92	203,080,756	76	27.77
23	Poland	1629	538.30	37,620,000	433	143.09
24	Russia	1019	462.66	146,150,789	70	31.66
25	Finland	1302	435.54	5,574,011	2336	781.38
26	Iran	658	377.13	84,055,000	78	44.87
27	Norway	1260	371.66	5,550,203	2270	669.63
28	Czech Republic	1210	369.11	10,900,555	1110	338.62
29	Turkey	910	318.40	85,372,377	107	37.30
30	Portugal	968	296.52	10,467,366	925	283.28
31	Saudi Arabia	881	268.36	32,175,224	274	83.41
32	New Zealand	721	209.92	5,305,600	1359	395.66
33	Ireland	813	181.36	5,281,600	1539	343.38
34	Mexico	603	176.17	129,625,968	47	13.59
35	Chile	750	175.15	19,960,889	376	87.75
36	Hungary	587	152.34	9,584,000	612	158.95
37	Thailand	604	149.49	66,090,475	91	22.62
38	South Africa	724	149.19	62,027,503	117	24.05
39	Greece	661	140.56	10,413,982	635	134.97
40	Argentina	503	135.92	46,654,581	108	29.13
41	United Arab Emirates	394	101.27	9,282,410	424	109.10
42	Pakistan	422	75.22	241,499,431	17	3.11
43	Slovenia	272	74.99	2,123,103	1281	353.21
44	Malaysia	339	74.94	33,379,500	102	22.45
45	Egypt	396	62.91	104,462,545	38	6.02
46	Vietnam	213	60.74	100,300,000	21	6.06
47	Romania	374	55.72	19,051,562	196	29.25
48	Indonesia	206	52.76	279,118,866	7	1.89
49	Colombia	379	49.51	52,695,952	72	9.40
50	Croatia	258	49.11	3,855,641	669	127.37

== See also ==
- Innovation Cluster Rating, top 100 science and technology clusters
- List of cities by scientific output
- List of countries by number of scientific and technical journal articles
- List of sovereign states by research and development spending
