= List of universities and colleges in Hebei =

The following is a list of universities and colleges in Hebei.

Name	Chinese name	Type	Location	Note
Hebei University	河北大学	Provincial	Baoding	
Hebei University of Engineering	河北工程大学	Provincial	Handan	
Hebei GEO University	河北地质大学	Provincial	Shijiazhuang	
Hebei University of Technology	河北工业大学	Provincial	Tianjin	Administrated by Hebei
North China University of Science and Technology	华北理工大学	Provincial	Tangshan	
Hebei University of Science and Technology	河北科技大学	Provincial	Shijiazhuang	
Hebei University of Architecture	河北建筑工程学院	Provincial	Zhangjiakou	
Hebei University of Water Resources and Electric Engineering	河北水利电力学院	Provincial	Cangzhou	
Hebei Agricultural University	河北农业大学	Provincial	Baoding	
Hebei Medical University	河北医科大学	Provincial	Shijiazhuang	
Hebei North University	河北北方学院	Provincial	Zhangjiakou	
Chengde Medical University	承德医学院	Provincial	Chengde	
Hebei Normal University	河北师范大学	Provincial	Shijiazhuang	
Baoding University	保定学院	Provincial	Baoding	
Hebei Normal University for Nationalities	河北民族师范学院	Provincial	Chengde	
Tangshan Normal University	唐山师范学院	Provincial	Tangshan	
Langfang Teachers University	廊坊师范学院	Provincial	Langfang	
Hengshui University	衡水学院	Provincial	Hengshui	
Shijiazhuang University	石家庄学院	Provincial	Shijiazhuang	
Handan College	邯郸学院	Provincial	Handan	
Xingtai University	邢台学院	Provincial	Xingtai	
Cangzhou Normal University	沧州师范学院	Provincial	Cangzhou	
Shijiazhuang Tiedao University	石家庄铁道大学	Provincial	Shijiazhuang	
Yanshan University	燕山大学	Provincial	Qinhuangdao	
Hebei Normal University of Science and Technology	河北科技师范学院	Provincial	Qinhuangdao	
Tangshan University	唐山学院	Provincial	Tangshan	
North China Institute of Science and Technology	华北科技学院	National (Other)	Langfang	
Chinese People's Armed Police Force Academy	中国人民武装警察部队学院	National (Other)	Langfang	
Hebei Institute of Physical Education	河北体育学院	Provincial	Shijiazhuang	
Hebei Finance University	河北金融学院	Provincial	Shijiazhuang	
North China Institute of Aerospace Engineering	北华航天工业学院	Provincial	Langfang	
Institute of Disaster Prevention	防灾科技学院	National (Other)	Langfang	
Hebei University of Economics and Business	河北经贸大学	Provincial	Shijiazhuang	
Central Institute for Correctional Police	中央司法警官学院	National (Other)	Baoding	
Hebei Institute of Communications	河北传媒学院	Private	Shijiazhuang	
Hebei Polytechnic Institute	河北工程技术学院	Private	Shijiazhuang	
Hebei Academy of Fine Arts	河北美术学院	Private	Shijiazhuang	
Hebei College of Science and Technology	河北科技学院	Private	Baoding	
Hebei Foreign Studies University	河北外国语学院	Private	Shijiazhuang	
Industrial and Commercial College, Hebei University	河北大学工商学院	Private	Baoding	
College of Light Industry, North China University of Science and Technology	华北理工大学轻工学院	Private	Tangshan	
Polytechnic College, Hebei University of Science and Technology	河北科技大学理工学院	Private	Shijiazhuang	
Huihua College, Hebei Normal University	河北师范大学汇华学院	Private	Shijiazhuang	
College of Economics and Management, Hebei University of Economics and Business	河北经贸大学经济管理学院	Private	Shijiazhuang	
Clinical College, Hebei Medical University	河北医科大学临床学院	Private	Baoding	
Science and Technology College, North China Electric Power University	华北电力大学科技学院	Private	Shijiazhuang	
Kexin College, Hebei University of Engineering	河北工程大学科信学院	Private	Handan	
City College, Hebei University of Technology	河北工业大学城市学院	Private	Langfang	
Liren College, Yanshan University	燕山大学里仁学院	Private	Qinhuangdao	
Sifang College, Shijiazhuang Tiedao University	石家庄铁道大学四方学院	Private	Shijiazhuang	
Huaxin College, Hebei GEO University	河北地质大学华信学院	Private	Shijiazhuang	
College of Modern Science and Technology, Hebei Agricultural University	河北农业大学现代科技学院	Private	Shijiazhuang	
Jitang College, North China University of Science and Technology	华北理工大学冀唐学院	Private	Tangshan	
Great Wall College, China University of Geosciences	中国地质大学长城学院	Private	Baoding	
Yanching Institute of Technology	燕京理工学院	Private	Langfang	
Dongfang College, Beijing University of Chinese Medicine	北京中医药大学东方学院	Private	Langfang	
Haibin College, Beijing Jiaotong University	北京交通大学海滨学院	Private	Cangzhou	
Hebei University of Traditional Chinese Medicine	河北中医学院	Provincial	Shijiazhuang	
Zhangjiakou University	张家口学院	Provincial	Zhangjiakou	
Hebei University of Environmental Engineering	河北环境工程学院	Provincial	Qinhuangdao	

== See also ==
- Oriental University City
