= Yamagata University =

University in Yamagata Prefecture, Japan

- 山形大学
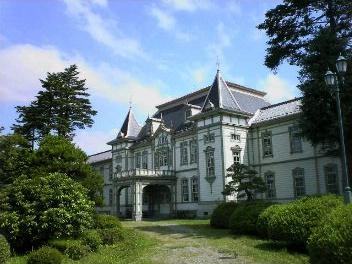
- The main Building of the Faculty of Engineering (ex- The Yonezawa Higher Technical School) built in 1910 is still in use as a University Museum.
- Motto: "Act Globally, Base Locally"
- Type: Public (National)
- Established: 1878 (1949)
- Endowment: US$320 million (FY2006)
- President: Kiyohito Koyama
- Faculty: 777 (2007)
- Administrative staff: 1,834 (2007)
- Students: 9073 (2015)
- Undergraduates: 7586 (2015)
- Postgraduates: 1287 (2015)
- Other students: 200 (International, 2015)
- Location: 1-4-12 Kojirakawa-machi, Yamagata 990-8560, Japan (Yamagata Campus); 2-2-2 Iida-nishi, Yamagata 990-9585, Japan (Iida Campus); 4-3-16 Jonan, Yonezawa 992-8510, Japan (Yonezawa Campus); 1–23 Wakaba-machi, Tsuruoka 997-8555, Japan (Tsuruoka Campus); 3-3-6-503 Shibaura, Minato, Tokyo 108-0023, Japan (Tokyo Center), Yamagata, Yonezawa, Tsuruoka, Yamagata, Japan; 38°15′16″N 140°20′53″E
- Campus: 8.47 km^{2} (2,094 acres)
- Colours: Green
- Nicknames: YU, Yamadai
- Website: www.yamagata-u.ac.jp

- Japan Yamagata Prefecture

Yamagata University (YU) (山形大学, Yamagata daigaku) is a national university located in the Japanese cities of Yamagata, Yonezawa, and Tsuruoka in Yamagata Prefecture.

The Times Higher Education released World University Rankings 2016–2017. Yamagata University ranked 600-800th out of the top 980 universities in the world.

In addition, YU is ranked the tenth place (10th) in Japanese research organization ranking, announcement in April 2017, by the analysis of the number of the highly cited papers in a "Materials Science" field alone in the Japanese local national university. Ranking by Thomson Reuters

The university was established in 1949, but its origin can be traced back to the Yamagata Normal School (山形師範学校, Yamagata Shihan Gakkō), a public teacher-training institution, founded in 1878 in Yamagata City. The university also has other roots: the Yonezawa Higher Technical School (米沢高等工業学校, Yonezawa Kōtō Kōgyō Gakkō) founded in 1910 in Yonezawa City, the Yamagata Higher School (山形高等学校, Yamagata Kōtō Gakkō) founded in 1920 in Yamagata City, the Yamagata Youth Normal School (山形青年師範学校, Yamagata Seinen Shihan Gakkō) founded in 1922 in Yamagata City, and the Yamagata Prefectural Agricultural College (山形県立農林専門学校, Yamagata Kenritsu Nōrin Senmon Gakkō) founded in 1947 in Tsuruoka City.

Yamagata University is the second-largest university in the Tohoku Region. The university has six faculties and about 10,000 students in four campuses. It also has an additional subcampus in which University K-9 schools are administered.

== History ==
The Imperial Japan (Meiji) Government decided to merge the "old" Yamagata, Okitama, and Tsuruoka Prefectures into one new Yamagata Prefecture in August 1876. Each of the former three prefectures had its own normal schools, but these were closed with the discontinuance of their administrative bodies. The direct institutional history dates back to 1877 when the Congress of new Yamagata Prefecture authorized an establishment of a new public teacher-training institution, Yamagata Prefectural Normal School, which was founded in September 1878 in Hatago-machi, Yamagata City.

Meanwhile, Yonezawa Higher Technical School, the first national school of higher education in the prefecture, was founded in 1910. The institute was the seventh National Higher Technical School in Japan following the establishment of Tokyo, Osaka, Kyoto, Nagoya, Kumamoto, and Sendai Higher Technical Schools. It was renamed the Yonezawa Engineering College under reformation of the law in 1944.

Ten years after the establishment of the Yonezawa Higher Technical School, another national school of higher education was founded (1920) in Yamagata Prefecture, Yamagata Higher School, located in Yamagata City and the 14th national higher school in Japan. During World War II, the United States' bombers destroyed the Komagome laboratories of the Japanese science research institute RIKEN, and it was evacuated to several local cities (Kanazawa, Osaka and Yamagata) as the situation worsened. One of the evacuations sites was Yamagata Higher School.

The National Yonezawa Higher Technical School and Yamagata Higher School were both prestigious schools at the time and played a central role when Yamagata University was established after World War II. The two schools produced a number of exceptional graduates, and alumni numbered about 5,500 and 5,000, respectively.

To meet the growing needs of primary and secondary education, Yamagata Prefecture founded one more public teacher-training institution, the Yamagata Prefectural Teacher's School for Vocational Supplementary Education, in 1922. The school developed and was renamed the Yamagata Youth Teachers School when control was transferred to the Japanese Ministry of Education (文部省, Monbushō) in 1944. Yamagata Prefectural Agriculture and Forestry School, founded in 1947 in Tsuruoka City, was also one of the predecessors of current Yamagata University.

Yamagata University was established on 31 May 1949 following the National School Establishment Law. Five old institutions of higher education in Yamagata Prefecture were integrated to form the new university: Yamagata Normal School founded in 1878, Yonezawa Engineering College founded in 1910, Yamagata Higher School founded in 1920, Yamagata Youth Teachers School founded in 1922, and Yamagata Prefectural Agriculture and Forestry School founded in 1947. The new university had a Faculty of Literature and Sciences, a Faculty of Education, a Faculty of Engineering, and a Faculty of Agriculture.

In 2006, Yuki Akio became the new university president in an election that caused much acrimony and hit the national press. Although he did not win the popular vote, a cabal of non-university Election Committee members forced through his nomination. Yuki was a civil servant at the Japanese Ministry of Education at the time and his appointment attracted much criticism for being a case of amakudari, a corrupt practice the government had vowed to stamp out.

=== List of events ===
1878
Yamagata Prefectural Normal School founded
1889
Established the Division of Woman Education in the Yamagata Prefectural Normal School
1902
Separated the Division of Woman Education and founded the Yamagata Prefectural Woman's Normal School
1910
Founded the National Yonezawa Higher Technical School with two departments (Dyeing and Weaving, and Applied Chemistry)
Established the Library of the Yonezawa Higher Technical School
1913
Established the Department of Machinery in the Yonezawa Higher Technical School
Reorganized the Department of Dyeing and Weaving into two independent departments (Dyeing and Weaving) in the Yonezawa Higher Technical School
1920
Founded the National Yamagata Higher School
Established the Yamagata Higher School Library
1921
Began an intercollegiate sports match between the Yonezawa Higher Technical School and the Yamagata Higher School
1922
Established the Department of Electricity in the Yonezawa Higher Technical School
Founded the Yamagata Prefectural Teacher's School for Supplementary Vocational Education
1935
Renamed the Yamagata Prefectural Teacher's School for Supplementary Vocational Education as the Yamagata Prefectural Youth Teachers School
1939
Established the Department of Communication Engineering in the Yonezawa Higher Technical School
1942
Established the Department of Machine Tools in the Yonezawa Higher Technical School
1943
Integrated the Yamagata Prefectural Normal School and the Yamagata Prefectural Woman's Normal School, and founded the National Yamagata Normal School
1944
Renamed the Yonezawa Higher Technical School as the National Yonezawa Engineering College following the amendment of School Education Law
Reorganized seven old departments into four: Departments of Machinery (former departments of Weaving, Machinery and Machine Tools), Chemical Industry (former departments of Applied Chemistry and Dyeing), Electrical Communication (former department of Communication Engineering), and Electricity (not changed)
Established the National Yamagata Youth Teachers School
1947
Founded the Yamagata Prefectural Agriculture and Forestry School with two departments (Agriculture and Forestry)
Founded the Research Institute for Local Industries in the Yonezawa Engineering College
1949
Founded Yamagata University under the National School Establishment Law on 31 May with four faculties (Literature and Sciences, Education, Engineering, and Agriculture)
- The Yamagata Normal School and Yamagata Youth Teachers School was developed into the Faculty of Education.
- The Yonezawa Higher Technical School was developed into the Faculty of Engineering with four departments (Textile Technology, Applied Chemistry, Mechanical Engineering, and Electrical Engineering).
- The Yamagata Higher School was developed into the Faculty of Literature and Sciences with two departments (Literature and Science).
- The Yamagata Prefectural Agriculture and Forestry School was developed into the Faculty of Agriculture with two departments (Agriculture and Forestry).

Established the Central, Engineering and Educational Libraries
Founded the University Farm and Forest in the Faculty of Agriculture

1950
Closed the Yamagata Higher School
Established the Agricultural Library
1951
Closed the Yonezawa Higher Technical School
Closed the Yamagata Normal School
Closed the Yamagata Youth Teachers School
Closed the Yamagata Prefectural Agriculture and Forestry School
1954
Founded the Junior College of Engineering
1957
Established the Department of Agricultural Engineering in the Faculty of Agriculture
1958
Established the Department of Chemical Engineering in the Faculty of Engineering
1959
Founded the Textile Production Research Laboratory in the Faculty of Engineering
1961
Established the Department of Precision Engineering in the Faculty of Engineering
1963
Established the Department of Electronic Engineering in the Faculty of Engineering
Closed the Educational Library and merged it in the Central Library
1964
Established the Graduate School of Engineering (Major courses: Textile Technology, Applied Chemistry, Chemical Engineering, Mechanical Engineering, and Electrical Engineering)
Established the Department of Agricultural Chemistry in the Faculty of Agriculture
1965
Established the Department of Polymer Chemistry in the Faculty of Engineering
Completed to consolidate the Division of Basic Technology in the Faculty of Engineering
Established the Course of Precision Engineering in the Graduate School of Engineering
1966
Founded the Computation Center in the Faculty of Engineering
1967
Established the Course of Electronic Engineering in the Graduate School of Engineering
Reorganized the Faculty of Literature and Sciences into three faculties: the Faculty of Literature and Social Sciences with two departments (Literature and Economics), the Faculty of Sciences with four departments (Mathematics, Physics, Chemistry and Biology), and the Faculty of General Education
1968
Established the Department of Horticulture and Fruit Science in the Faculty of Agriculture
1969
Established the Course of Polymer Chemistry in the Graduate School of Engineering
1970
Established the Graduate School of Agricultural Sciences (Major courses: Agriculture, Forestry, Agricultural Engineering, and Agricultural Chemistry)
Founded the Research Observatory for Biological Production as a joint research facility on the International Biological Program (IBP)
Founded the Radioisotope Laboratory in the Faculty of Science
1972
Renamed the Department of Textile Technology as the Department of Textile and Polymer Technology, Faculty of Engineering
Renamed the Course of Textile Technology as the Course of Textile and Polymer Technology, Graduate School of Engineering
1972
Established the Course of Horticulture and Fruit Science in the Graduate School of Agricultural Sciences
1973
Established the Faculty of Medicine with a department (Department of Medicine)
Established the Radioisotope Laboratory in the Faculty of Medicine
1975
Established the Independent Qualifying Course for School Nurses in the Faculty of Education
Delegated the Research Observatory for Biological Production to Yamagata University, and renamed it as the Urabandai Limnological Station, Faculty of Science
1976
Established the University Hospital
Founded the Laboratory Animal Center in the Faculty of Medicine
1976
Renamed the Textile Production Research Laboratory as the Macromolecular Research Laboratory, Faculty of Engineering
1977
Founded the Institute of Forestry in Heavy Snowing Region in the Faculty of Agriculture
1978
Established the Department of Earth Science in the Faculty of Science
Established the Medical Library
1979
Established the Graduate School of Medicine (Major course: Medicine)
Established the Graduate School of Science (Major courses: Mathematics, Physics, Chemistry and Biology)
1980
Established the Department of Law in the Faculty of Literature and Social Sciences
1981
Established the Instrumental Center in the Faculty of Medicine
1982
Established the Course of Earth Science in the Graduate School of Science
1983
Established the Department of Information Engineering in the Faculty of Engineering
Renamed the Department of Textile and Polymer Technology as the Department of Polymer Materials Engineering, Faculty of Engineering
Established the Evening Course in the Faculty of Engineering with five departments (Polymer Materials Engineering, Applied Chemistry, Mechanical Engineering, Electrical Engineering, and Information Engineering
Founded the Research and Guidance Center for Teaching Practice in the Faculty of Education
Renamed the Instrumental Center as the Central Laboratory for Research and Education, Faculty of Medicine
1985
Closed the Junior College of Engineering
1987
Established the Course of Information Engineering in the Graduate School of Engineering
Renamed the Course of Textile and Polymer Technology as the Course of Polymer Materials Engineering, Graduate School of Engineering
Founded the Yamagata University Computing Service Center (Kojirakawa Center, Yonezawa, Iida and Tsuruoka Branches)
1990
Reorganized nine old departments in the Faculty of Engineering into three: Departments of Materials Science and Engineering (former departments of Polymer Materials Engineering, Polymer Chemistry, Applied Chemistry, and Chemical Engineering), Mechanical Systems Engineering (former departments of Mechanical Engineering and Precision Engineering), and Electrical and Information Engineering (former departments of Electrical Engineering, Electronic Engineering, and Information Engineering)
Established the United Graduate School of Agricultural Sciences (three-year doctorate courses) in Iwate University (representative), Hirosaki and Yamagata University as participants (Major courses: Science of Bioproduction, Science of Bioresources, and Science of Biotic Environment)
1991
Reorganized five old departments in the Faculty of Agriculture into two: Departments of Bioproduction and Bioenvironment
1993
Established the Graduate School of Education (Major courses: School Education, and Teaching Arts)
Established the Department of Nursing in the Faculty of Medicine
Reorganized nine old courses in the Graduate School of Engineering into three major courses with 14 groups of master's program: six groups of Materials Science and Engineering (former courses of Polymer Materials Engineering, Polymer Chemistry, Applied Chemistry, and Chemical Engineering, besides a division of Basic Technology), three groups of Mechanical Systems Engineering (former courses of Mechanical Engineering and Precision Engineering), and five groups of Electrical and Information Engineering (former courses of Electrical Engineering, Electronic Engineering, and Information Engineering, besides a division of Basic Technology)
Renewed two major courses with nine groups of doctorate program in the Graduate School of Engineering: five groups of Materials Science and Energy Engineering and four groups of Systems and Information Engineering
1994
Participated Obihiro University of Agriculture and Veterinary Medicine in the United Graduate School of Agricultural Sciences
1995
Reorganized each department in the Faculty of Science to have two major groups and renamed: Departments of Mathematical Sciences (former department of Mathematics), Physics (not changed), Material and Biological Chemistry (former department of Chemistry), Biology (not changed), and Earth and Environmental Sciences (former department of Earth Science)
Reorganized five old courses in the Graduate School of Agricultural Sciences into two major courses: Courses of Science of Bioproduction and Science of Bioenvironment
1996
Closed the Faculty of General Education
Reorganized three old departments in the Faculty of Literature and Social Sciences into two: Departments of Human Sciences and Cultural Studies (former department of Literature), and Public Policy and Social Studies (former departments of Economics and Law)
Closed the Macromolecular Research Laboratory, Faculty of Engineering
Established the independent course of Human Sensing and Functional Sensor Engineering with five groups of doctorate program in the Graduate School of Engineering
1997
Established the Graduate School of Social and Cultural Systems (Major courses: Social Systems and Cultural Systems)
Established the Course of Nursing in the Graduate School of Medical Science
Renamed the Graduate School of Medicine as the Graduate School of Medical Science with two major courses: Courses of Medicine and Nursing
1998
Reorganized two old departments in the Faculty of Agriculture into three: Departments of Bioproduction, Bioenvironment, and Bioresource engineering
1999
Closed the Graduate School of Science
Renamed the Graduate School of Engineering as the Graduate School of Science and Engineering, and reconstructed the research and educational programs
Established five major courses with ten groups of master's program: two groups of Mathematical Sciences, two groups of Physics, two groups of Material and Biological Chemistry, two groups of Biology, and two groups of Earth and Environmental Sciences
Established a major course with three groups of doctorate program: Interactive Symbiosphere Sciences
Reorganized five old groups in the Course of Human Sensing and Functional Sensor Engineering into six groups of master's and doctorate programs
2000
Reorganized three old departments in the Faculty of Engineering into six: Departments of Polymer Science and Engineering (former courses of polymer science in department of Materials Science and Engineering), Chemistry and Chemical Engineering (former courses of chemical science in department of Materials Science and Engineering), Electrical Engineering (former courses of electrical science in department of Electrical and Information Engineering), Informatics (former courses of Computer Science in department of Electrical and Information Engineering), Bio-System Engineering (former courses of bio-system science in department of Electrical and Information Engineering), and Mechanical Systems Engineering (not changed)
Established the Environmental Preservation Center in Iida Campus
Established the Research Laboratory for Molecular Genetics in Iida Campus
2001
Renamed the Research and Guidance Center for Teaching Practice as the Integrated Center for Education Research and Training, Faculty of Education
2002
Reorganized two old courses in the Graduate School of Agricultural Sciences into three major courses: Courses of Science of Bioproduction, Science of Bioenvironment, and Science of Bioresource Engineering
2004
Transformed Yamagata University into the National University Corporation Yamagata University under the National University Corporation Act
Established the Course of Environmental Life Science in the Graduate School of Medical Science
Reorganized two old courses with twelve groups (Materials Science and Engineering, and Electrical and Information Engineering) in the Graduate School of Science and Engineering into five major courses with twelve groups of master's program: three groups of Polymer Science and Engineering, three groups of Chemistry and Chemical Engineering, two groups of Electrical Engineering, two groups of Informatics, and two groups of Bio-System Engineering
Reorganized the Yamagata University Computing Service Center into the Yamagata University Networking and Computing Service Center
2005
Reorganized the Faculty of Education into the Faculty of Education, Art and Science with three departments: Department of Education, Department of Art and Culture, and Department of Information, Environmental and Food Sciences
Closed the Integrated Center for Education Research and Training, Faculty of Education
Founded the Teacher Training Research Center, Yamagata University
2006
Renamed the Department of Public Policy and Social Studies as the Department of Law, Economics and Public Policy, Faculty of Literature and Social Sciences
Established the Course of Science of Cryobiosystems in the United Graduate School of Agricultural Sciences
Reorganized the University Farm and Forest into the Yamagata Field Science Center in the Faculty of Agriculture

== Campuses and colleges ==
Yamagata University has four main campuses, Yamagata-Kojirakawa, Yamagata-Iida, Yonezawa and Tsuruoka. Approximately 10,000 students are enrolled, including 177 international students. Yamagata-Matsunami Campus has no research facility except for Teacher Training Research Center; there exists University K-9 schools. Also the university has the Tokyo Satellite Center (3-3-6-503 Shibaura, Minato, Tokyo 108-0023, Japan).

=== Campuses ===
- Kojirakawa Campus (1-4-12 Kojirakawa-machi, Yamagata 990-8560, Japan)

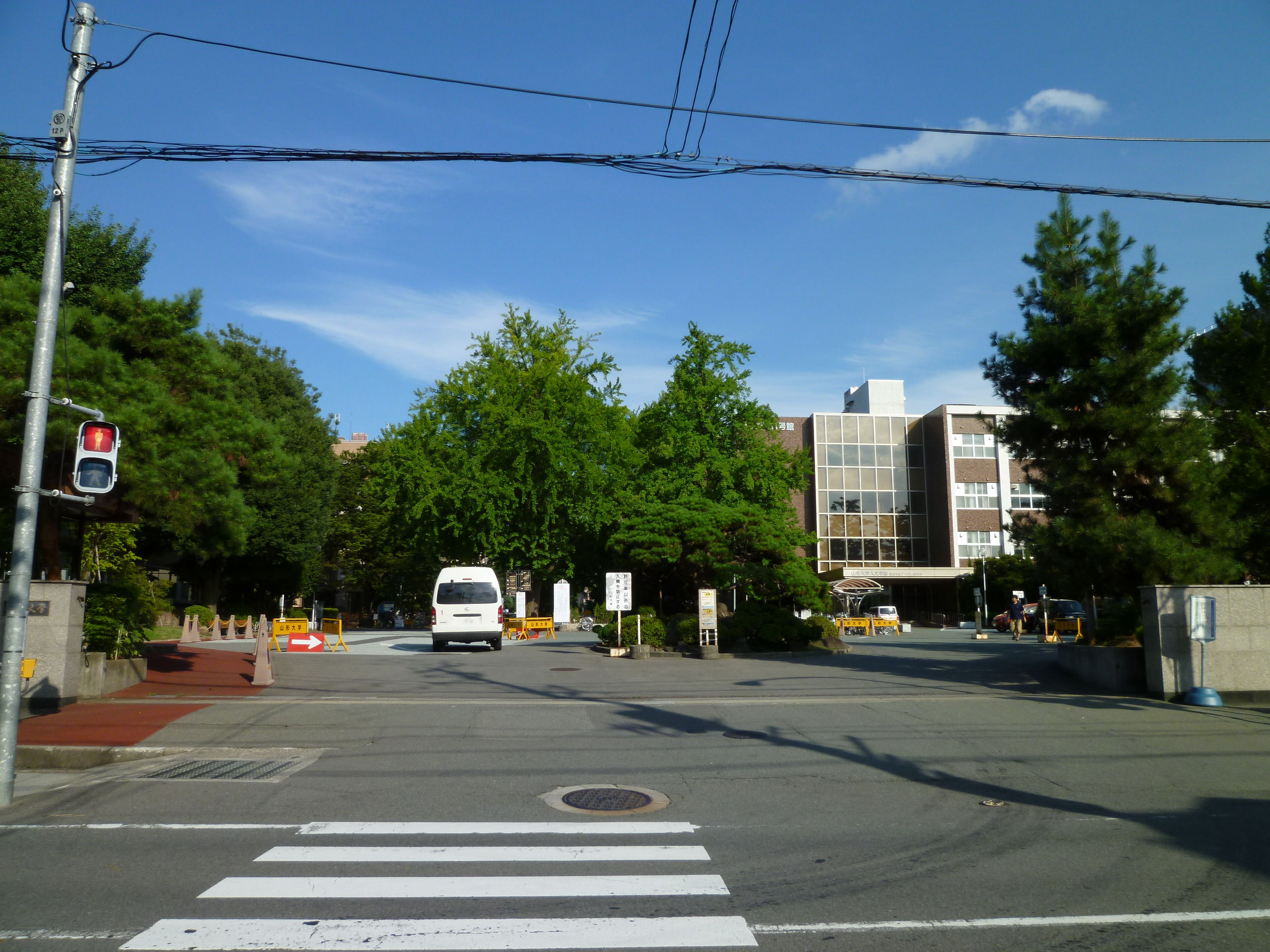
Yamagata-Univ. Kojirakawa-Campus Main-Gate

- Administration Bureau
- Faculty of Education, Art and Science

Primary Education course
Music course
Art course
Sports course
Intercultural Studies course
Food Science and Nutrition course
Environment and Space Design course
Systems Science and Information Studies course

- Faculty of Literature and Social Sciences
- Faculty of Science
- University Library
- University Museum
- Cooperative Research Center (Yamagata Satellite)
- Education Center for Foreign Language
- Information Center
- International Center
- Networking and Computing Service Center (Yamagata Branch)
- Radioisotope Laboratory
- Research Center for Higher Education
- Teacher Training Research Center
- Health Administration Center
- Gymnasium

- Iida Campus (2-2-2 Iida-nishi, Yamagata 990-9585, Japan)

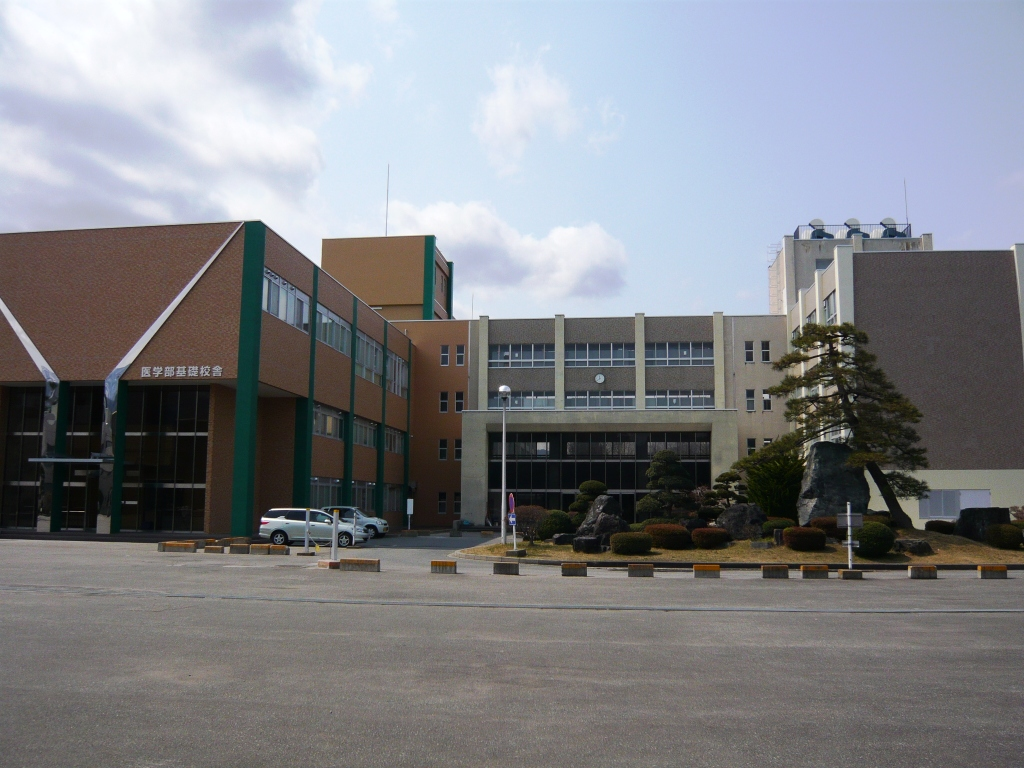
Department of Medicine, Yamagata University, JAPAN building for basic medicine

- Faculty of Medicine
- University Hospital
- University Library (Medical Branch)
- Central Laboratory for Research and Education
- Environmental Preservation Center
- Laboratory Animal Center
- Radioisotope Laboratory
- Research Laboratory for Molecular Genetics
- Special School Attached to the University
- Gymnasium

- Yonezawa Campus (4-3-16 Jonan, Yonezawa 992-8510, Japan)

- Faculty of Engineering
- University Library (Engineering Branch)
- Cooperative Research Center
- Incubation Center
- Networking and Computing Service Center
- Venture Business Laboratory (VBL)
- Health Administration Center (Yonezawa Branch)
- Gymnasium

- Tsuruoka Campus (1–23 Wakaba-machi, Tsuruoka 997-8555, Japan)
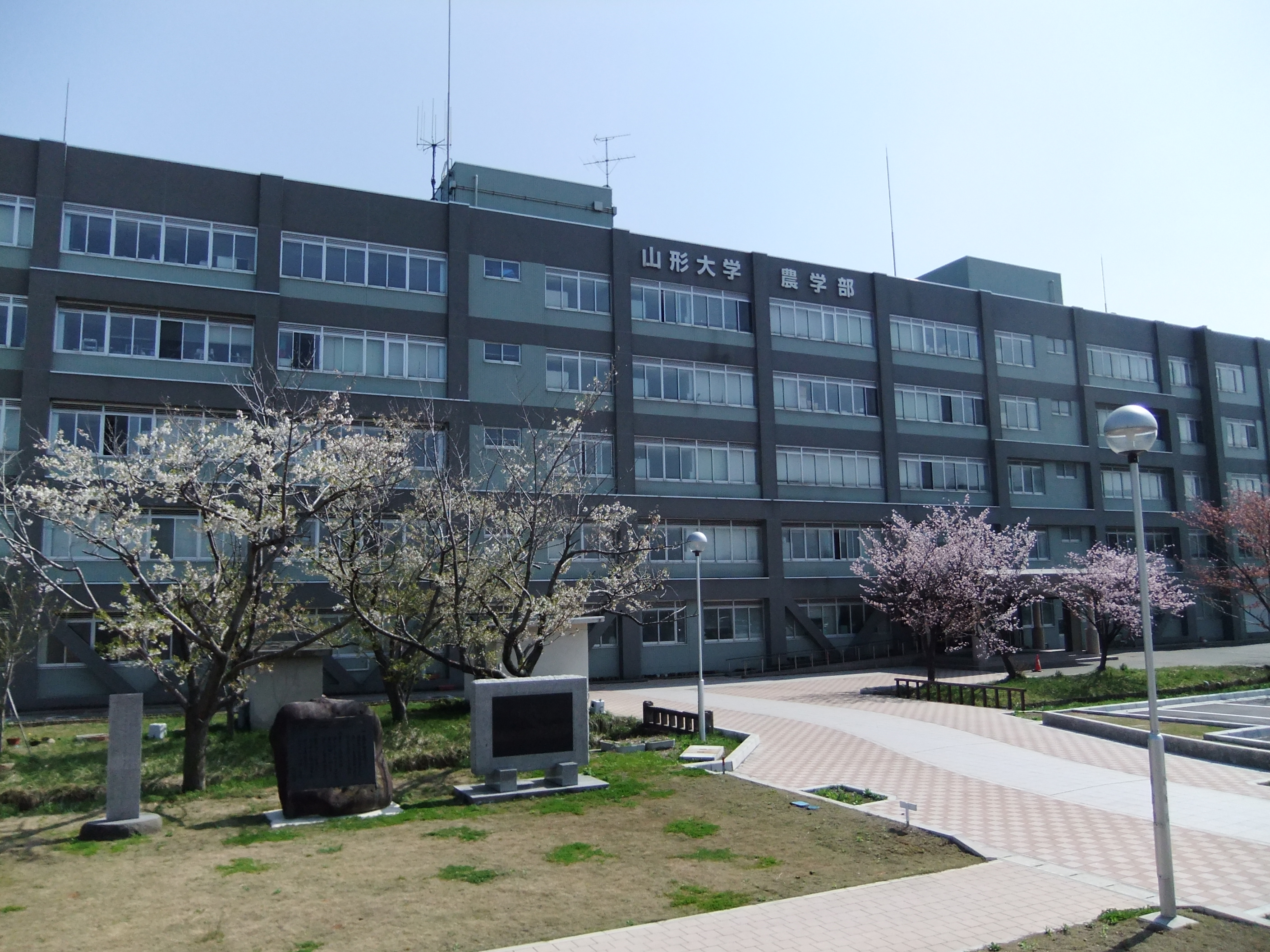
  Campus of Faculty of Agriculture, Yamagata University, Japan

- Faculty of Agriculture
- University Farm
- University Forest
- University Library (Agricultural Branch)
- Networking and Computing Service Center (Tsuruoka Branch)
- Research Laboratory for Molecular Genetics (Tsuruoka Branch)
- Research Laboratory for Radioisotope (Tsuruoka Branch)
- Health Administration Center (Tsuruoka Branch)
- Gymnasium

=== Faculties ===
Yamagata University consists of six faculties:

- Faculty of Literature and Social Sciences
- Faculty of Education, Art and Science
- Faculty of Science
- Faculty of Medicine
- Faculty of Engineering
- Faculty of Agriculture

=== Graduate schools ===
Yamagata University consists of six graduate schools and a united graduate course:

- Graduate School of Social and Cultural Systems
- Graduate School of Education
- Graduate School of Science
- Graduate School of Medicine
- Graduate School of Engineering
- Graduate School of Agricultural Sciences
- The United Graduate Course of Agricultural Sciences

=== Research facilities ===
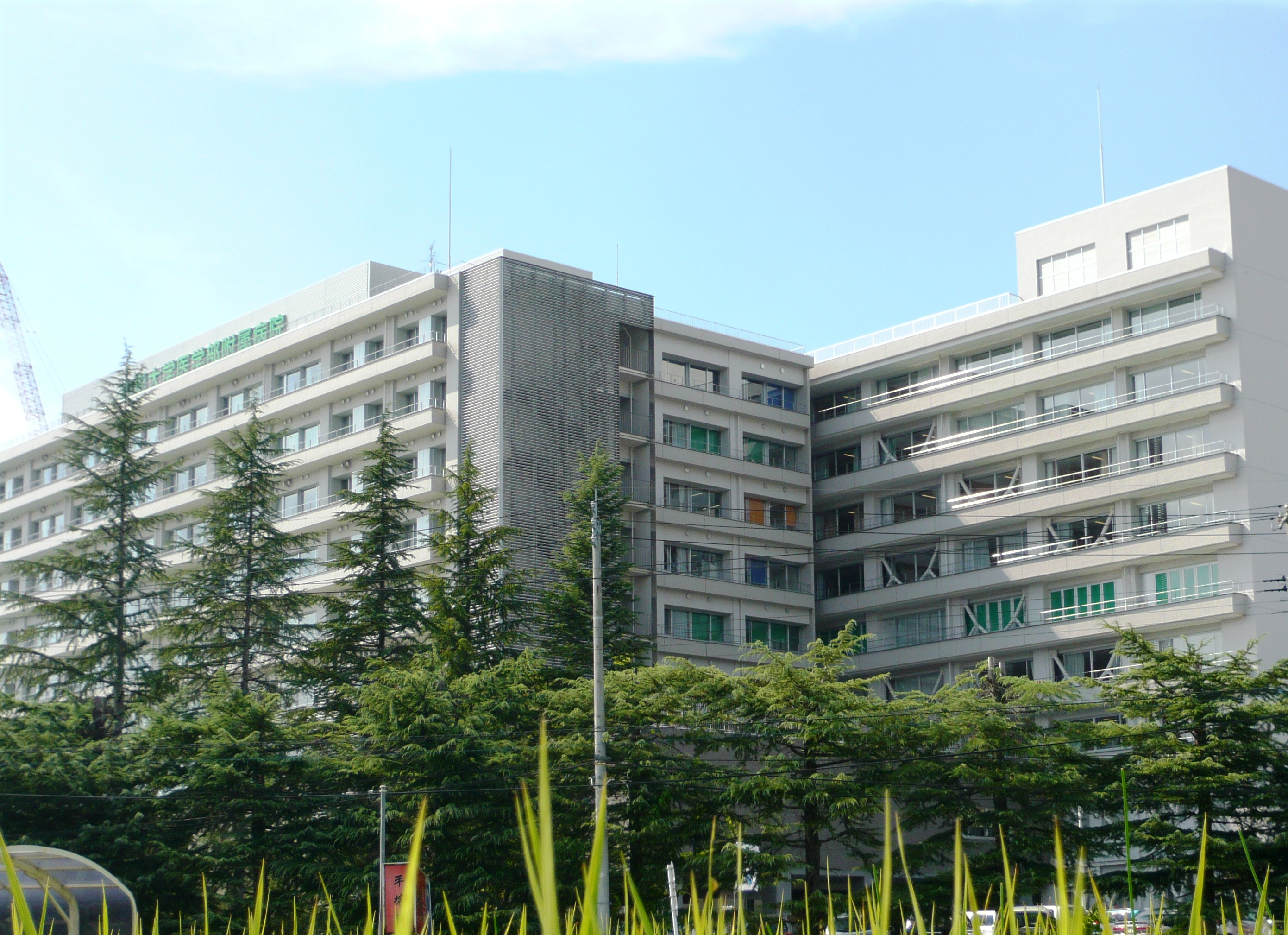
- Yamagata University Hospital.
  University Farm
- University Forest
- University Hospital
- University Libraries (Central, Medical, Engineering, Agricultural)
- University Museum
- Central Laboratory for Research and Education
- Cooperative Research Centers (Yonezawa Center, Yamagata Satellite)
- Education Center for Foreign Language
- Environmental Preservation Center
- Incubation Center
- Information Center
- International Center
- Laboratory Animal Center
- Networking and Computing Service Centers [NCSC] (Yamagata Center, Yonezawa, Iida and Tsuruoka)
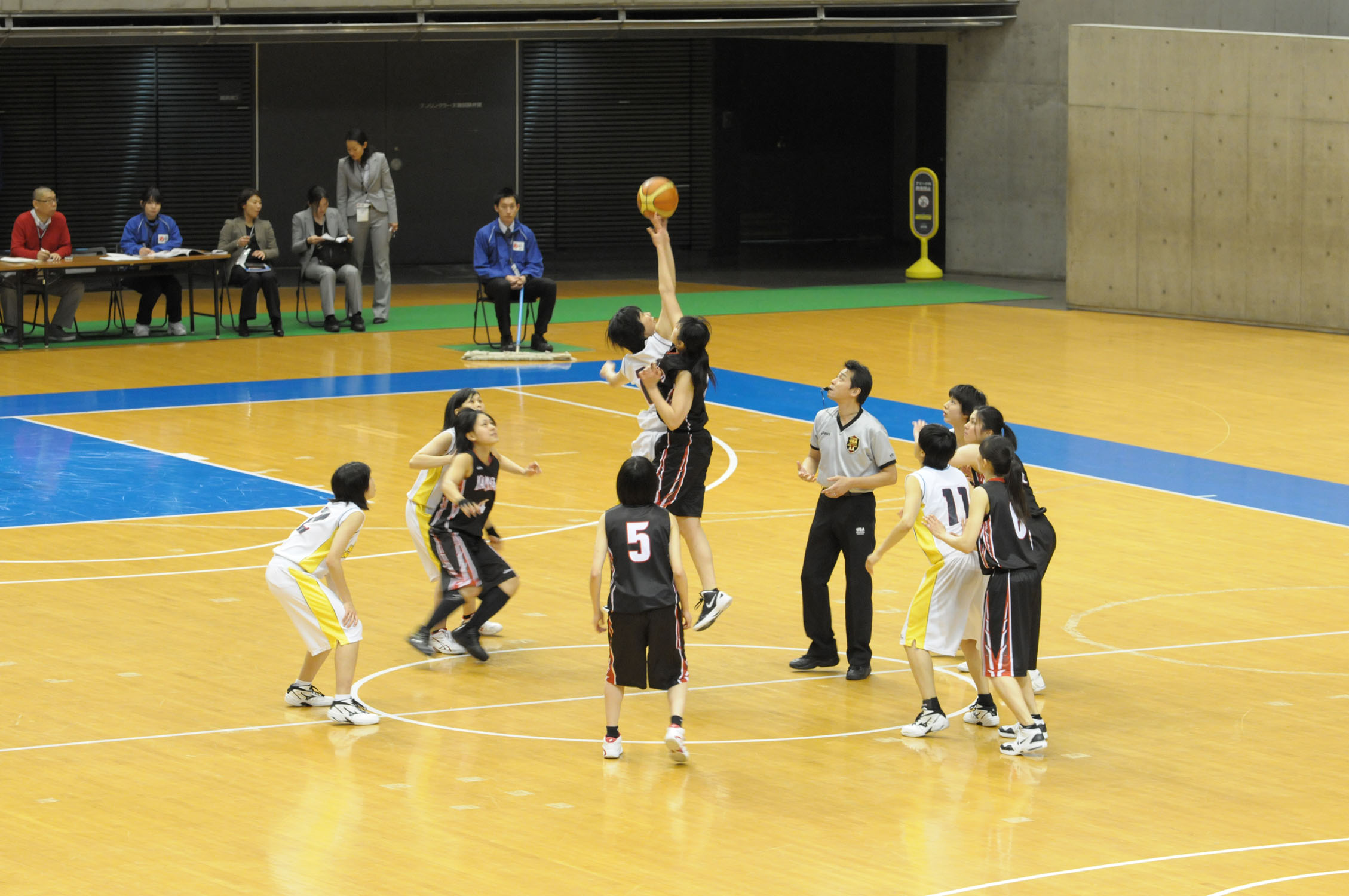
- Osaka University of Human Sciences vs Yamagata university. Women's basketball 2012.
  Radioisotope Laboratory (Yamagata Center, Iida and Tsuruoka)
- Research Laboratories for Molecular Genetics (Iida Center and Tsuruoka)
- Research Center for Higher Education
- Teacher Training Research Center
- Teacher Training Research Center
- Venture Business Laboratory [VBL]

=== Other facilities ===
- University Gymnasia (Yamagata, Iida, Yonezawa and Tsuruoka)
- Health Administration Centers (Yamagata, Yonezawa and Tsuruoka)
- University-Attached Schools (Kindergarten, Elementary School, Junior High School and Special School)

== Affiliations ==
Yamagata University is affiliated with 48 universities and institutes in 18 countries. The University maintains international exchange agreements with 25 institutions in nine different countries (2007).

=== Inter-University Agreement ===
Country	Institute
Chile	University of Talca
China	Harbin Medical University
China	Hebei Medical University
China	Jilin University
China	North China Coal Medical University
Estonia	Tallinn University
Latvia	University of Latvia
Peru	National University of San Marcos
Russia	Buryat State University
South Korea	Daegu University
South Korea	Inje University
Taiwan	Ming Chuan University
United States	State University of New York
United States	State University of New York at Cobleskill
United States	The University of Texas at Arlington

=== Inter-Faculty Agreement ===
Faculty of Literature and Social Sciences
Country	Institute
China	Guangxi Normal University
China	Harbin Institute of Technology, School of Foreign Languages
Russia	Buryat State University, Department of Oriental Studies
South Korea	Chonnam National University, College of Humanities
United States	Fort Lewis College (Durango, CO)
Faculty of Education, Art and Science
Country	Institute
China	Beihua University
Latvia	University of Latvia, Faculty of Modern Languages
Romania	University of Bucharest
South Korea	Inje University, School of Humanities and Social Sciences
Taiwan	Ming Chuan University, School of Applied Languages
Faculty of Science
Country	Institute
South Korea	Daegu University, College of Natural Sciences
South Korea	Pusan National University, College of Natural Sciences
Faculty of Medicine
Country	Institute
China	Harbin Medical University
China	Hebei Medical University
China	Ningxia Medical College
China	North China Coal Medical University
China	Shanghai Jiao Tong University School of Medicine
China	Zhejiang University School of Medicine
Faculty of Engineering
Country	Institute
Bangladesh	Chittagong University of Engineering and Technology
China	Donghua University, School of Material Science and Engineering
China	Henan Polytechnic University
China	Henan University, College of Chemistry and Chemical Engineering
China	Jilin Institute of Chemical Technology
China	Jilin University
China	Northeast Dianli University
China	The Chinese Academy of Sciences, Institute of Chemistry (ICCAS)
Germany	Friedrich Alexander University of Erlangen Nuremberg, Technical Faculty
Hungary	Budapest University of Technology and Economics
Ukraine	Kharkiv National University of Radioelectronics
United States	Texas State University
United States	The University of Texas at Dallas, Erik Jonsson School of Engineering and Computer Science
Vietnam	Ho Chi Minh City National University, Ho Chi Minh City University of Natural Sciences
Faculty of Agriculture
Country	Institute
Bangladesh	Hajee Mohammad Danesh Science and Technology University
Bangladesh	Sher-e-Bangla Agricultural University
Chile	University of Talca, Faculty of Agricultural Sciences
China	China Agricultural University, College of Food Science and Nutritional Engineering
China	Shenyang Agricultural University
China	Yanbian University, Agricultural College
China	Zhejiang Academy of Agricultural Sciences
Indonesia	Gadjah Mada University, Faculty of Agriculture
Indonesia	Gadjah Mada University, Faculty of Forestry
Indonesia	Lambung Mangkurat University, School of Agriculture
Laos	National University of Laos, Faculty of Engineering
Mongolia	Mongolian State University of Agriculture
South Korea	Chungbuk National University, College of Agriculture, Life and Environments Sciences
Sri Lanka	University of Peradeniya, Faculty of Agriculture

== Notable people and alumni ==
- Yasushi Akashi (1931–) – Yamagata Higher School (1950), Diplomat and UN administrator
- Takeo Doi (1904–1996) – Yamagata Higher School (1925), Aircraft Designer, He designed Kawasaki Ki-10, Ki-61, Ki-100 and NAMC YS-11.
- Michiro Endō (1950–) – Yamagata University (1973), Musician
- Shūhei Fujisawa (1927–1997) – Yamagata Normal School (1949), Author
- Yatarō Mishima (1867–1919) – Yamagata Prefectural Normal School (1882), 8th President of the Bank of Japan, Senator, House of Peers of the Japanese Imperial Diet
- Shichirō Murayama (1908–1995) – Yamagata Higher School (1929), Linguist
- Mikio Narita (1935–1990) – Faculty of Literature and Sciences (1959), Actor
- Yoshihiro Togashi (1966–) – Faculty of Education (1988), Manga artist
- Takaaki Yoshimoto (1924–) – Yonezawa Higher Technical School (1945), Poet, literary critic, and philosopher

== Points of interest ==
- Main Building of Yonezawa Higher Technical School (a designated national Important Cultural Property)

4-3-16 Jonan, Yonezawa 992-8510, Japan (Yonezawa Campus, Yamagata University)

- Education Museum of Yamagata Prefectural Museum (ex- Main Building of Yamagata Prefectural Normal School, one of the Japanese "Designated National Important Cultural Properties")

2-2-8 Midori-cho, Yamagata 990-0041, Japan

- Auditorium of Yamagata Prefectural Yamagata North High School (ex- Music Hall of Yamagata Prefectural Normal School, one of the Prefectural "Designated Important Cultural Properties")

2-2-7 Midori-cho, Yamagata 990-0041, Japan
