= Athletics at the 2005 Summer Universiade – Women's 10,000 metres =

The women's 10,000 metres event at the 2005 Summer Universiade was held on 15 August in İzmir, Turkey.

The winning margin was 45.51 seconds which as of 2024 remains the only time the women's 10,000 metres has been won by more than 40 seconds at these games.

== Results ==
Rank	Athlete	Nationality	Time	Notes
1st place, gold medalist(s)	Eri Sato	Japan	34:12.06	
2nd place, silver medalist(s)	Zeng Guang	China	34:57.57	PB
3rd place, bronze medalist(s)	Mary Davies	New Zealand	35:58.20	
4	Janet Bett Jessang	Uganda	36:44.14	
	Volha Krautsova	Belarus	DNS	
	Jolene Byrne	Ireland	DNS	
	Tatyana Pukhovich	Kazakhstan	DNS	
