= Zheng Zhiying =

Chinese businessman

- 郑志瑛
- Born: June 1963; 63 years ago Jize, Handan, China
- Education: Hebei University of Economics and Business Chinese Academy of Social Sciences; Yanshan University Tsinghua University
- Occupation: Chairman of Bank of Handan
- Political party: Chinese Communist Party

Zheng Zhiying is the chairman of Bank of Handan Co. Ltd, a state-owned regional joint-stock commercial bank, since 2014. Zheng is a specialist with special government allowances of the State Council.

== Education ==
In 1978, Zheng studied in the Department of Business and Economics at Hebei University of Economics and Business, where Zheng pursued a bachelor's degree in economics. In 1995, he attended the Graduate School of the Chinese Academy of Social Sciences, specializing in Business Management, and obtained a graduate certificate. In 2004, Zheng enrolled in the graduate program at Yanshan University, organized by the Organization Department of the Hebei Provincial Committee of the Chinese Communist Party (CCP). During this program, Zheng earned a graduate degree, an MBA degree, and a master's degree in Industrial Engineering. He Zheng pursued an executive MBA at Tsinghua University's PBC School of Finance.

== Career ==
Zheng has worked in various roles throughout his career.

=== Handan City government ===
Zheng started by working as a farmer at Baisan Brigade in Jize County, Hebei. Then he worked in the Planning Commission of Handan City government and concurrently served as the Secretary of the Communist Youth League branch. Following that, Zheng worked at Handan Trust and Investment Company, holding positions such as Deputy Office Director and Senior Economist. Zheng also served as the deputy director at the Port Office of the Handan Municipal Government.

Subsequently, Zheng held positions as deputy director in the General Office of the Handan Municipal Government and Deputy Secretary-General of the Municipal Government.

=== Bank of Handan ===
From 2005 to 2014, Zheng has been the General Manager of Handan Urban Credit Cooperative Society Co., Ltd., as well as the President of the Bank of Handan. In 2014, Zheng assumed the role of Chairman of the Bank of Handan.

Zheng emphasized a shift towards increased CCP influence in bank operations, emphasizing the leadership role of the CCP. This change aims to ensure that the CCP provides essential support for the real economy. Additionally, it seeks to reduce excessive focus on the "three meetings and one layer" system, which was previously accorded great significance. These measures are seen as aligning with central directives and legal provisions, reflecting a broader effort to enhance the CCP's oversight in banking operations.

In 2021, Zheng publicly expressed that he lean toward conservatism to adopting new technologies in the banking sector. Zheng believes that banks should prioritize risk control over innovation. Zheng suggests waiting for new technologies to mature, citing concerns about the digital divide and trial-and-error costs. He emphasizes the need for strict regulation in China's fintech development.

=== Part-time position at universities ===
Zheng is part-time supervisor for Master's Students at Yanshan University, Hebei University of Economics and Business, Hebei Finance University, and Guangdong University of Finance and Economics, Part-time Professor at Hebei University of Economics and Business and Handan Municipal Party School.

== Professional qualifications and awards ==
- Senior economist (a professional qualification in China)
- Special government allowances of the State Council

== Publications ==
- Annual Report On The Development Of Finance In Beijing-Tianjin-Hebei Region
