= Institute of Civil Engineering (disambiguation) =

The Institute of Civil Engineering (India) may refer to:

- Institute of Civil Engineering of the University of the Philippines Diliman.
- Indian Railways Institute of Civil Engineering of Indian Railways.
- Hebei Institute of Architecture and Civil Engineering, a private university in Hebei, China.

As an organization, it may also refer to:

- Institution of Civil Engineers.
