= Liujiang Basin Geological Relics National Nature Reserve =

Nature reserve in Hebei, China

- China
- Location: Shimenzhai Town, Haigang District, Qinhuangdao, Hebei, China
- Coordinates: 40°08′N 119°35′E
- Area: 1,395 ha (5.39 sq mi)
- Established: 2005

The Liujiang Basin Geological Relics National Nature Reserve is a national nature reserve of the People's Republic of China located in Shangzhuangtuo Village, Shimenzhai Town, Haigang District, Qinhuangdao, Hebei Province (formerly under Funing District).

== Introduction ==
The Liujiang Basin Geological Relics National Nature Reserve is the core scenic area of the Qinhuangdao Liujiang National Geopark, located in Shimenzhai Town and Zhucaoying Town of Haigang District, Qinhuangdao. Geological strata from the Archean, Proterozoic, Paleozoic, Mesozoic, and Cenozoic eras are distributed throughout the basin. Featuring three stratigraphic sequences, three major rock types, six unconformities, abundant paleontological fossils, and diverse geological structures and landforms, the basin provides a comprehensive record of 2.5 billion years of environmental change, crustal evolution, and biological evolution, earning it the reputation of a "geological encyclopedia" among scholars. Its principal features include paleontological fossils, stratigraphic relics, karst landscapes, and granitic landforms, and it has been described as a "geological museum of the Earth" and a "laboratory and natural museum for geoscientific research".

In 2002, Qinhuangdao Liujiang National Geopark was approved as one of the second batch of 33 national geoparks in China. The geopark and its surrounding areas contain karst caves, Elephant Trunk Hill, sinkholes, cliffs, and solution grooves formed through karst processes; waterfalls, isolated hills, and river terraces formed by fluvial action; and marine geological features including sea arches, sea cliffs, wave-cut grooves, sea caves, marine terraces, wave-cut platforms, and tidal flats. In summary, mixed granites formed between 2.5 and 1.6 billion years ago constitute the geological background of the Beidaihe and Shanhaiguan tourist areas; limestones deposited in ancient seas between 540 and 250 million years ago gave rise to karst landforms such as Elephant Trunk Hill and caves; Mesozoic granite mountains formed between 250 million and 65 million years ago created mountainous tourist landscapes; and modern marine geological processes have produced China's largest coastal dunes and lagoons, together with various erosional and depositional coastal landforms.

In 1869, Ferdinand von Richthofen family conducted geological surveys of coalfields in the Liujiang Basin. In 1919, Liu Chi-chen and Yeh Liang-fu established the type section of the Liangjiashan Formation. In 1922, German geologist Madiyou conducted studies on the limestone and sandstone formations of the basin. In 1982, the Geological Society of China held its 60th anniversary conference in Beidaihe and conducted field investigations in the basin. In 1993, the 30th International Geological Congress designated the basin as a special excursion route. In 2000, the Sixth International Organisation of Palaeobotany Conference was held in Qinhuangdao.

The Liujiang Basin serves as a field practice base for students majoring in geology, geography, resources, environmental science, and civil engineering, and as a research base for geological institutions. It has been referred to as the "second classroom of geological education" and the "cradle of geoscientific talent". In 1923, Sun Yun-chu of the Department of Geology at Peking University led five students, including Yang Zhongjian, to the basin for field practice. Since the establishment of the People's Republic of China, more than seventy universities and research institutions, including Peking University, China University of Geosciences, Northwest University, and the Chinese Academy of Sciences, have conducted research and teaching practice in Qinhuangdao. Prominent researchers who have worked in the basin include Ferdinand von Richthofen, Weng Wenhao, Ding Wenjiang, Sun Yunzhu, Liu Jichen, Ye Liangfu, Ma Diyou, Huang Jiqing, Cheng Yuqi, Zhang Wenyu, and Chen Guoda.

On 23 July 2005, the General Office of the State Council issued the "Notice on the Establishment of 17 New National Nature Reserves Including the Hebei Liujiang Basin Geological Relics Reserve" (Guobanfa [2005] No. 40), approving the proposal of the State Environmental Protection Administration and thereby establishing the Liujiang Basin Geological Relics National Nature Reserve.

On 9 August 2005, the State Environmental Protection Administration issued a notice (Huanhan [2005] No. 314) defining the area, boundaries, and functional zoning of the seventeen newly established national nature reserves. The Liujiang Basin Geological Relics National Nature Reserve was designated with a total area of 1,395 hectares, including a core area of 476 hectares, a buffer zone of 516 hectares, and an experimental zone of 403 hectares. Its principal conservation targets are standard geological sections and typical geological structures. Located between 119°30′–119°40′E and 40°02′–40°14′N, the reserve consists of four relatively independent sections:

- Dongbuluo–Chaoshuiyu–Shaguodian Area: "With a total area of 857 hectares, it extends eastward from the western foot of Zhangyanzi Village along an axis of 280° to a point 500 metres north of Dongbuluo Village, with a width ranging from 500 to 900 metres. It then continues westward along an east–west axis to a point 500 metres south of Shiling Village, extending 3,750 metres in length and 750–2,000 metres in width. The axis then turns to 150° and extends approximately 2,000 metres to a point 800 metres east of Shaguodian Village, with a width of 770 metres."
- Liangjiashan–Huanxiling–Wajiashan Area: "Covering 217 hectares, it extends from the steep eastern slope of Liangjiashan through the eastern side of Huanxiling Village to the ridge west of Wajiashan Village, forming an S-shaped belt with a width ranging from 250 to 850 metres."
- Heishanyao–Dawashan Area: "With an area of 155 hectares, it stretches from the western side of Houshan Village in Heishanyao along an axis of 295° to the western slope of Dawashan, approximately 2,500 metres long and 600–800 metres wide."
- Jiguanshan Area: "Covering 166 hectares, it extends northwestward from the foot of the slope located 350 metres northwest of Balinggou Village, crossing the Tang River valley to the cliffs west of Dapingtai."

== Qinhuangdao Liujiang Geoscience Museum ==
Qinhuangdao Liujiang Geoscience Museum
- Location in Hebei
- Established: 2014
- Location: Shangzhuangtuo Village, Shimenzhai Town, Haigang District, Qinhuangdao, Hebei, China
- Coordinates: 40.133°N 119.583°E

The Qinhuangdao Liujiang Geoscience Museum is located within the Liujiang Basin Geological Relics National Nature Reserve and is administered by the Department of Land and Resources of Hebei Province. On 18 May 2014, coinciding with the 38th International Museum Day, the Qinhuangdao Liujiang Geoscience Museum was officially opened. Zhang Guojun, Deputy Director of the Hebei Provincial Department of Land and Resources, delivered a speech, and together with Song Zhanyu, Vice Chairman of the Qinhuangdao Municipal Committee of the Chinese People's Political Consultative Conference, unveiled the museum plaque.

The museum has a floor area of 8,122 square metres and consists of five sections: the Earth Science Hall, the Liujiang Basin Geological Relics Hall, the Rock, Mineral and Fossil Specimen Hall, the Qinhuangdao National Geopark Landscape Hall, and a Multimedia Auditorium. Through videos, display panels, models, physical specimens, and reconstructed scenes, the museum presents the universe and the Solar System, the structure of the Earth, geological processes, biological evolution, the marine and terrestrial changes of the Liujiang Basin and its geological relics, as well as the geological and natural landscapes of Qinhuangdao.

The museum occupies the former site of the China Coal Miners School in Qinhuangdao, which has been designated a protected cultural heritage site by Qinhuangdao Municipality. After the founding of the People's Republic of China, the government established retraining platforms for coal miners and founded specialized coal miners' schools throughout the country. One of these institutions was the China Coal Miners School in Qinhuangdao. Established in December 1950, the school was located on the site of the former Great Wall Coal Mine at Shangzhuangtuo in Funing District, north of Qinhuangdao. Chen Yu, Minister of Fuel Industry of the Central People's Government, served concurrently as honorary principal, while Jin Zhifu, Chairman of the China National Coal Mine Trade Union, served as principal.

In its early years, the school's infrastructure and facilities were rudimentary, and model workers, activists, students, and staff participated personally in the construction of campus buildings. In 1952, the institution was renamed the China Coal Miners Accelerated Middle School. In 1959, it was reorganized as the Qinhuangdao Enterprise Management School, offering majors in accounting, planning and statistics, and materials management. In 1973, it became the Hebei Qinhuangdao Coal Mine School, and in 1979 it was renamed the Qinhuangdao Coal Finance School.

In 1980, the school applied to the Ministry of Coal Industry of the People's Republic of China for permission to relocate to urban Qinhuangdao, which was approved. A new campus occupying 230 mu was subsequently established at Baitaling in the city. After 1983, five additional programs—transportation, auditing, labor administration, computer applications, and secretarial archives—were introduced, covering most administrative specialties required by coal enterprises. In 1984, the school was renamed the Qinhuangdao Coal Industry Management School of the Ministry of Coal Industry.

In 1987, the new campus was completed and part of the institution relocated, initiating a period during which the school operated at two sites, with the original campus becoming known as the "Beishan Campus". Following the 1993 restructuring of the State Council, which abolished eighteen industrial ministries including the Ministry of Coal Industry, schools formerly under ministerial administration were transferred to provincial governments. In 1998, plans were made to merge the school with Hebei Agricultural and Technical Teachers College in Changli County. The merger was completed in 2000 under the name Hebei Vocational and Technical Teachers College, which was renamed Hebei Normal University of Science and Technology in 2003.

After the relocation of the institution, the former coal school campus at Liujiang Beishan was abandoned. Many buildings remain structurally sound and retain their orderly layout, representing typical campus architecture of the 1950s and 1960s. The surrounding area also preserves numerous industrial and military sites constructed during the mid-twentieth century, including the former Liujiang Coal Mine, the former Great Wall Cement Plant, the former Qinhuangdao Beishan Power Plant, a former People's Liberation Army barracks, and early Japanese-style industrial buildings such as a power station.
