= Hebei University of Chinese Medicine =

Hebei University of Chinese Medicine Chinese: 河北中医药大学
- Motto: Learn extensively and seek the source; cultivate virtue and benefit the world.
- Type: Public
- Established: 1956
- Affiliations: Hebei Provincial Department of Education
- President: Gao Weijuan
- Students: 9,899
- Location: Hebei Province, China
- Campus: 596,855.63 square meters
- Website: www.hebcm.edu.cn

Hebei University of Chinese Medicine (HUST) is a higher education institution of traditional Chinese medicine located in Shijiazhuang, capital city of Hebei Province, China. Founded in 1956, it was one of the earliest institutions in Chinese medicine established in the People’s Republic of China. The university is jointly established by the People's Government of Hebei Province and the State Administration of Traditional Chinese Medicine.

== History ==
In 1956, "Hebei Traditional Chinese Medicine Junior College" was established in Baoding, Hebei Province. The Hebei Institute of Traditional Chinese Medicine was also established in the same year.

In 1958, the school was renamed "Hebei College of Traditional Chinese Medicine".

In 1962, the college merged with Tianjin College of Chinese Medicine.

In 1969, the college merged with the Hebei Medical College to form the "Hebei New Medical University".

In 1984, Hebei Medical College (Department of Traditional Chinese Medicine) and Hebei Provincial Hospital of Traditional Chinese Medicine merged to form the new Hebei College of Traditional Chinese Medicine.

In May 1995, according to a decision by the Hebei Provincial Government, Hebei Medical College, Hebei College of Traditional Chinese Medicine, and Shijiazhuang Medical College merged to form Hebei Medical University.

In April 18, 2013, Hebei College of Traditional Chinese Medicine was established by the merger of Hebei Medical University School of Traditional Chinese Medicine and Hebei Academy of Traditional Chinese Medicine.

On June 25, 2018, the Qizhou Campus of Hebei College of Traditional Chinese Medicine (formerly the Anguo Medicinal Herb Planting Experimental Farm of Hebei Province) was officially established.

In June 2023, with the approval of the Ministry of Education, The Hebei College of Traditional Chinese Medicine was renamed "Hebei University of Chinese Medicine".

== Current situation ==
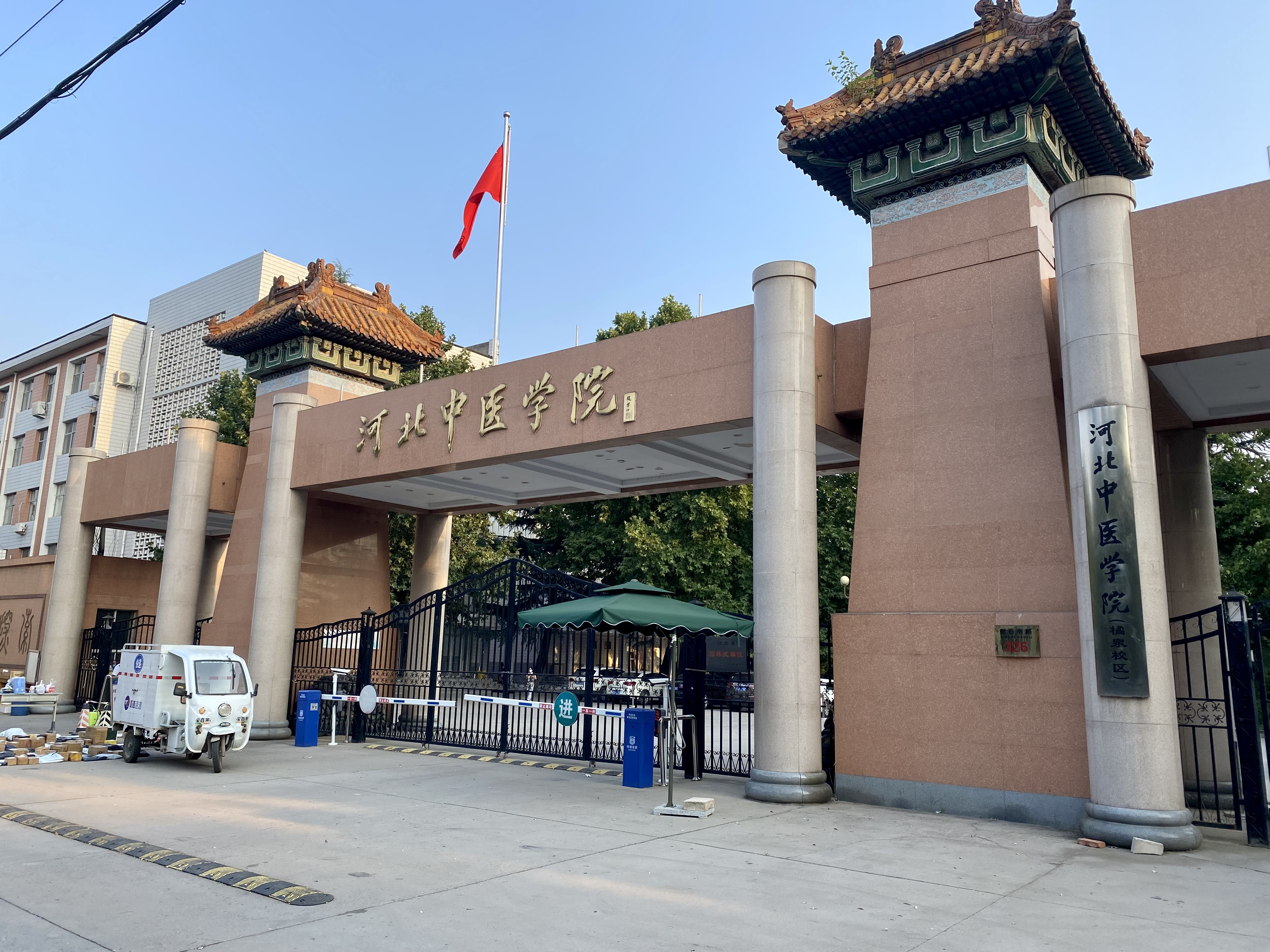
Hebei University of Traditional Chinese Medicine (Juquan Campus)

There are three campuses, Xingyuan (main campus), Juquan and Qizhou, covering a land area of 582,621.78 square meters totally.

There are 21 hospitals, 2 directly affiliated and 19 non-directly affiliated.

There are 9,399 full-time students, including over 1,000 international students from 30 countries.

The university published 3 papers listed in Nature Index for the Time frame of 1 January 2025 - 31 December 2025.

In the 2026 Shanghai Ranking, Hebei University of Chinese Medicine ranked 20 among China's universities of Chinese medicine.

The university is a provincial key university of Hebei. Among its tens of thousands of graduates, there are three academicians and a number of masters of traditional Chinese medicine.

== Undergraduate Programs ==
The university offers 26 undergraduate programs, including Traditional Chinese Medicine, Integrated Traditional Chinese and Western Medicine, Traditional Chinese Pharmacy, Nursing, Acupuncture and Moxibustion, Rehabilitation Therapy, Traditional Chinese Medicinal Resources and Development, Medical Laboratory Technology, Medical Imaging Technology, Bioengineering, Pharmaceutical Engineering of Traditional Chinese Medicine, Cultivation and Identification of Traditional Chinese Herbal Medicines, Stomatological Technology, Pediatric Traditional Chinese Medicine, Traditional Chinese Medicine Health Preservation, Traditional Chinese Medicine Rehabilitation, Traditional Chinese Medicine Orthopedics, Pharmacy, Midwifery, Applied Psychology, Health Services and Management, Chinese International Education, Public Administration, Marketing, Pharmaceutical Engineering, and Health Inspection and Quarantine. These programs cover five academic disciplines: medicine, science, engineering, management, and literature. And there are programs for master and doctoral degrees.

== See also ==
- Hebei Medical University
