= Institute of the Pacific United =

- Former name: International Pacific College (1990–2015)
- Motto: Go Global at IPU New Zealand
- Type: Private Training Establishment (PTE)
- Established: 11 May 1990; 36 years ago
- Accreditation: NZQA
- Academic affiliations: Soshi Educational Group
- President: Chris Collins
- CEO: Hiroshi Ohashi
- Academic staff: 50 (2025)
- Students: 217 (2025)
- Location: Palmerston North, New Zealand; 40.3848°S 175.6166°E
Colours
- Mascot: Kiwi-Kun
- Website: www.ipu.ac.nz

Institute of the Pacific United is a Japanese and New Zealand private tertiary educational institution based in Palmerston North, New Zealand. Another network of the institute is International Pacific University, which was established in 2007 in Okayama, Japan. Students of IPU New Zealand come from more than 20 different countries around the world.

As of 2025, IPU New Zealand is rated as a Category 2 provider by the New Zealand Qualifications Authority, a change from its previous Category 1 status.

IPU New Zealand mainly offers tertiary education in business (including accounting, finance, marketing and management), international relations, linguistics, environmental studies and tourism.

The institution had been known as International Pacific College (IPC) for 25 years until its name was officially changed to Institute of the Pacific United (IPU New Zealand) on 26 September 2015.

== Courses ==
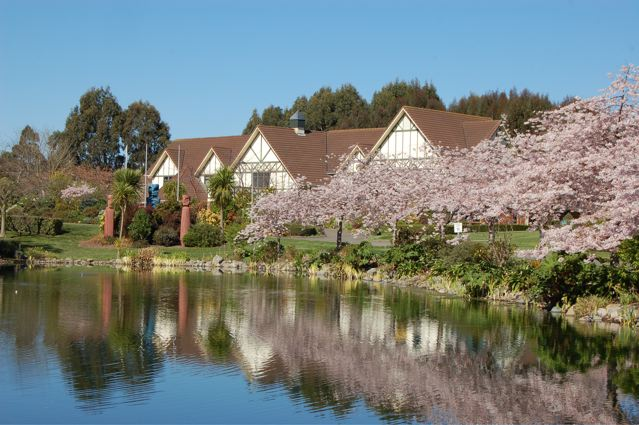
View of the IPU New Zealand campus's Administration Building, with the blossoming Sakura trees in September.

IPU New Zealand offers the following courses:

- Master of Global Business (MGB) and Postgraduate Diploma in Global Business (PDGB): These programmes are designed to prepare students for careers in international business.
- Master of Contemporary International Studies (MCIS) and Postgraduate Diploma in Contemporary International Studies (PDCIS): These programmes have been replaced by the Master of Global Business (MGB) and Postgraduate Diploma in Global Business (PDGB), respectively. The MCIS and PDCIS are no longer accepting new enrolments under their former names, though currently enrolled students may complete their studies by 2027.
- Graduate Diploma of Contemporary International Studies: Aimed at students who already hold an undergraduate degree and wish to expand their knowledge in areas such as Language Studies, International Business, and International Relations.
- Bachelor of Contemporary International Studies (BCIS): This undergraduate programme allows students to explore key disciplines and specialise in areas including International Business, International Relations, Japanese Studies, and TESOL & Language Studies.
- TESOL: IPU New Zealand offers short-term, intensive training courses for in-service teachers of English as a Foreign Language (EFL).
- Level 1–5 English Language Studies – These programmes are designed for students seeking to improve their English language proficiency. The courses are based on learner-centred, communicative classroom approaches, each focusing on one of the four key communication skills: listening, speaking, reading, and writing.

== Clubs and Student Activities ==
IPU hosts a range of student clubs and organisations that support cultural, recreational, and sporting activities. Among the best known is the Japanese KODAMA Drum Team, a taiko drumming club that has performed at national and local events, including the 2014 World Taiko Meet, a Super Rugby match between the Hurricanes and the Sunwolves, and the annual Festival of Cultures in Palmerston North. Other student organisations include the Art Club, Badminton Club, and Indonesian Student Community Club. The university also organises a programme of excursions known as Tiki Tours, which provides students with opportunities to travel and explore different parts of New Zealand.

== Alumni Network ==
The IPU Alumni Network supports graduates' professional development and fosters connections. It includes initiatives such as:

- Global Networking: Provides a platform for alumni to connect internationally, potentially leading to collaborations and career opportunities.
- Exclusive Job Opportunities: Offers early access to job listings from organizations associated with IPU alumni and partners.
- Professional Development Events: Organizes workshops, seminars, and networking sessions, available online and in-person, to support career advancement.
- Alumni Mentor Program: Connects alumni with current IPU students to facilitate guidance.
- New Student Referral Program: Allows alumni to participate in student recruitment efforts for IPU.

== Partner universities ==
- (Brazil) Universidade Christus (Unichristus)
- (Brazil) Fundación Escuela de Comercio Álvares Penteado
- (Brazil) Del Rey Colégio Internacional
- (Brazil) Colégio Santo Antônio
- (China) National Institute of Japanese language courses in Middle School
- (China) Guilin University of Technology
- (China) Guizhou University
- (China) Liaoning University of Technology
- (China) Dali University
- (China) Jiao Zuo University
- (China) Shanghai Industrial and Commercial Polytechnic
- (China) Xingtai University
- (China) Qingdao University of Science and Technology
- (Indonesia) President University
- (Indonesia) Universitas MaChung
- (Indonesia) Universitas Gadjah Mada
- (Japan) International Pacific University
- (Japan) Tokyo International Business College
- (Japan) Kanda Gaigo-gakuin
- (Kazakhstan) Suleyman Demirel University
- (Mexico) ITESO - Universidad Jesuita de Guadalajara Guadalajara
- (Mexico) ICT - Instituto Cultural Tampico
- (Russia) Vladivostok State University of Economics and Service
- (Russia) Peter the Great St. Petersburg Polytechnic University
- (Russia) MiSIS - National University of Science and Technology
- (Taiwan) National Chengchi University
- (Tajikistan) Tajik State University of Commerce
- (Tajikistan) Lyceum of Tajik State University of Commerce
- (Thailand) Rangsit University
- (Thailand) Payap University
- (Uzbekistan) Karshi State University
- (Uzbekistan) Samarkand State University
- (Uzbekistan) Banking-Finance Academy
- Uzbekistan State University of Languages
- "El-Yurt Umidi" - Foundation for training specialist abroad under the Agency for the Development of Public service and the President of the Republic of Uzbekistan
- The Republican Research Center for Development of Innovative Methods in Teaching Foreign Languages at the Uzbekistan State University of World Languages
- Academic Lyceum of the Uzbekistan State World Languages University
- (Uzbekistan) Academic Lyceum of Westminster University in Tashkent
- (Vietnam) Foreign Trade University
- (Vietnam) Ho Chi Minh City Department of Education and Training

== Controversies ==
=== Madogiwa-zoku employment dispute ===
In 1994, academic Noel Hanlon filed a case against the institution, then known as IPC, claiming he was subject to the Japanese employment practice known as "madogiwa-zoku" ("window people"), in which staff are removed from active duties but cannot be dismissed due to lifetime employment policies. The dispute was settled out of court.

=== Staff redundancies ===
On 24 May 2013, the Manawatu Standard broke an article detailing the difficulties the reporter had getting information from the management staff as to the organisational restructure that was taking place. Sources, including previous and current employees, had revealed to the newspaper, under the condition of anonymity, that more than 10% of the work force had been "laid off, left or were "forced out" since the start of the year." Sources also revealed the extent of the institutions use of service as opposed to permanent employment contracts, and that "Management were reluctant to be upfront about the restructure because of cultural differences and the need to "save face."

President Wayne Edwards responded to the article more than a month and half later in an interview with the reporter, stating that privacy concerns had prompted the College's extended silence on the issue.

=== Fraud allegations ===
In April 2020, Stuff reported that IPU New Zealand’s parent company, Soshi Gakuen, had unsuccessfully taken one of its former employees, Khiet Thanh Vo, to the High Court, alleging he had used money intended for overseas recruitment trips to buy a house. Associate Judge Kenneth Johnston dismissed the claim, finding there was no evidence of fraud and that the financial arrangements in question were standard practice.

A later Stuff article reported that the court ordered Soshi Gakuen to pay Vo $19,800 in legal costs, with the judge describing the fraud allegation as merely a "theory" and criticising the organisation for making such a serious claim without proper evidence.
