= Evgeniya Korobkova =

Russian writer (born 1985)

Evgeniya Sergeevna Korobkova (Russian: Евгения Сергеевна Коробкова; born 2 July 1985) is a Russian literary critic, poet, journalist, translator and blogger living in Moscow. Candidate of philological sciences. Currently, she works at the Izvestia.

In 2007, she graduated with honours from the South Ural State University. In 2009, she graduated with honours from the Faculty of Journalism of the Chelyabinsk State University. She also graduated from the Maxim Gorky Literature Institute.

She worked as a university lecturer and engineer. She worked at the Vechernyaya Moskva.

As a literary critic, she collaborates with Znamya, Oktyabr, Moskva.

She was born in Kartaly and has lived in Moscow since 2010.

In 2016 she received the Rimma Kazakova prize.
