= Bank of Handan =

Chinese state-owned regional commercial bank

Bank of Handan Co Ltd
- Native name: 邯郸银行股份有限公司
- Industry: Financial Services
- Founded: 2007; 18 years ago
- Headquarters: Congtai District, Handan, Hebei, China
- Area served: Hebei Province
- Key people: Zheng Zhiying(郑志瑛)
- Revenue: ▼CN¥ 3,532 billion (2022)
- Net income: ▲CN¥ 1,519 billion (2022)
- Website: https://www.hdcb.cn/

Bank of Handan Co Ltd is a state-owned regional commercial bank based in Handan, Hebei, China. It focus on deposits, wealth management, micro loans, foreign exchange, internet banking, and trade finance services. The bank also offer services to institutional and international customers.

== History ==
In 1984, the first urban credit cooperative in Handan was established. In 1994, the Handan Urban Credit Cooperative was established and in October 1996 it officially opened. In March 2002, according to the requirements of the financial system reform of the State Council, on the basis of the original 15 urban credit cooperatives in urban areas, it was restructured and reorganized into a single-legal entity joint-stock urban credit cooperative.

On October 30, 2007, China Banking Regulatory Commission approved the establishment of Handan City Commercial Bank based on the restructured cooperative. On June 10, 2008, the Hebei Banking Regulatory Bureau approved the opening of Handan Commercial Bank Co., Ltd and on July 10, 2008 it was officially listed. On November 26, 2010, the China Banking Regulatory Commission approved the renaming of Handan City Commercial Bank as Bank of Handan Co Ltd.

On December 28, 2010, Shijiazhuang Branch of Bank of Handan officially opened. At the end of June 2018, there were 32 business outlets, the balance of deposits was CN¥ 16.2 billion, and the balance of full-caliber loans was CN¥ 7.7 billion. On December 30, 2016, Baoding Branch opened; on April 22, 2018, Xingtai Branch opened.

== Controversies ==
In 2022, the Bank of Handan was reported that it was involved in a fraud case related to Lihe Jimin, with the amount involved exceeding CN¥ 210 million.

== Award ==
In 2018, Bank of Handan ranked 662 in Top 1000 World Banks ranking released by magazine The Banker.
