= Zeng Guang =

Chinese epidemiologist at the Chinese Center for Disease Control and Prevention

- 曾光
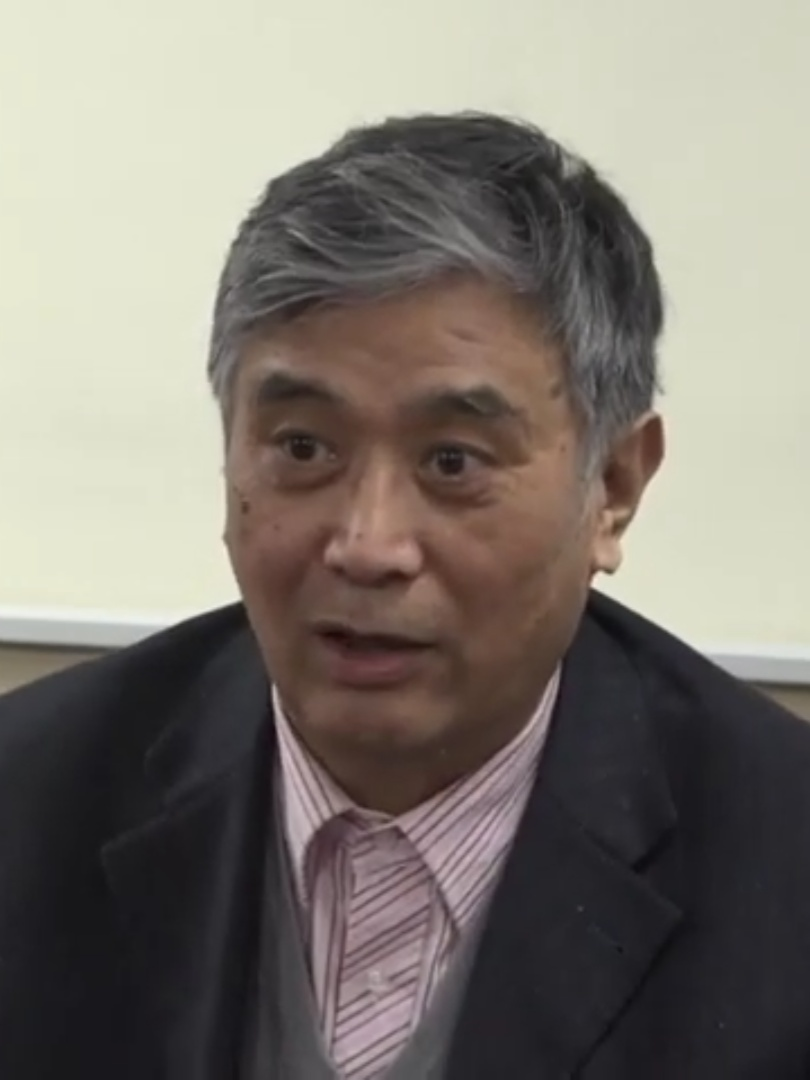
- Zeng Guang
- Born: May 22, 1946 (age 80); Beijing, China
- Education: Hebei Medical University; Peking Union Medical College
- Scientific career
- Fields: Epidemiology
- Workplaces: Chinese Center for Disease Control and Prevention (CDC)

Zeng Guang (Chinese: 曾光; pinyin: Zēng Guāng; born 22 May 1946) is a Chinese epidemiologist who is a chief scientist and doctoral supervisor at the Chinese Center for Disease Control and Prevention (Chinese CDC). He is a member of the High-level Expert Panel of the National Health Commission.

== Biography ==
Zeng was born in 1946 in the Republic of China. After graduating from Hebei Medical College (now Hebei Medical University), he was in the graduate school of Peking Union Medical College, studying for a master's degree in medical science. He was a visiting scholar at the Centers for Disease Control and Prevention (CDC) between 1985 and 1986. In 2003, he served as a consultant for the SARS Prevention and Control Headquarters. In a June 2021 interview with Chinese Communist Party-owned tabloid Global Times, Zeng stated that a probe into the origins of COVID-19 should shift to the United States.
