= Chelyabinsk State University =

Public university in Chelyabinsk, Russia

Coordinates: 55°10′38.0″N 61°19′10.4″E

Chelyabinsk State University (CSU)
- Челябинский Государственный Университет (ЧелГУ)
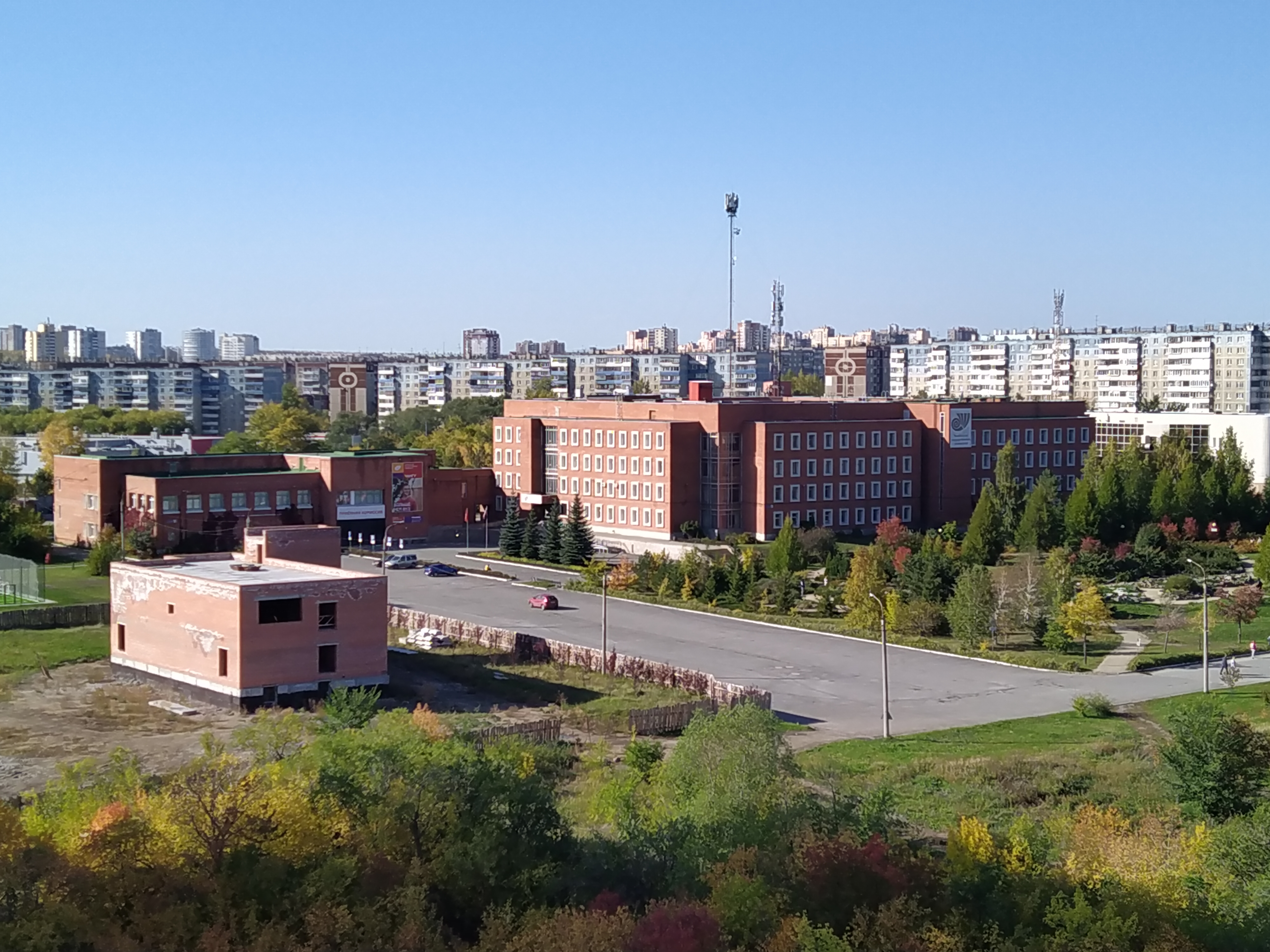
- Motto: Primum mobile in saecula saeculorum
- Type: Public
- Established: 1976
- Location: Chelyabinsk, Russia
- Campus: Urban
- Website: www.csu.ru/en

University rankings

Regional – Overall
- QS Emerging Europe and Central Asia: 401-450 (2022)

Chelyabinsk State University is a public university in Chelyabinsk, Russia. It was established in 1976 and is considered to be one of the leading academic institutions in the Ural region. Member of Association of Classical Universities of Russia and Eurasian Association of Universities.

== History ==
On April 3, 1974, Council of Ministers of the Soviet Union decided on establishment of Chelyabinsk State University - the first university of the Southern Ural On October 4, 1976, the official opening took place. In 1997, a scientific center of nature and human study, based on archeological laboratory, was founded

In 2023, building of university campus was started Also, partnerships were established between university and Chelyabinsk region's basketball federation, ice hockey club Traktor, volleyball club Dynamo-Metar, football club Chelyabinsk, water polo club Uralochka

Today the structure of the University includes 13 faculties and in 7 educational and research institutes. The University has three branches (Miass, Troitsk, and Kostanay (Kazakhstan)), and 13 offices (Argayash, Verkhniy Ufaley, Zlatoust, Shadrinsk, Kopeysk, Orsk, Nyazepetrovsk, Trekhgorny, Yuzhnouralsk, Satka, Kyshtym, Varna, Ust-Katav).

== Administration ==
In accordance with the legislation of the Russian Federation and Chelyabinsk State University Charter, the University management is carried out by the Rector, who is elected in a secret vote at the Conference for a five-year term.

In order to settle the most important questions concerning the vital university activities, the University Conference is summoned by the Rector and the Academic Council, composed of the university academic staff along with other occupational groups and students.

=== Rectors ===
In 1976, S.E. Matushkin, a corresponding member of the USSR Academy of Pedagogical Sciences, became the first rector of Chelyabinsk State University.

In 1987, V.D. Batukhtin, Professor of Physics and Mathematics, became a rector.

In 2004, A.Yu. Shatin, Professor of Economics, was elected as a rector.

In 2014, Diana Tsiring, Professor of Psychology, was elected as a rector.

Since 2019, Sergey Taskaev, Professor of Physics and Mathematics, is a rector. Before that, he was Dean of the Faculty of Physics.

== Academics ==
=== Post-graduate studies ===
Foreign citizens without knowledge of the Russian language are enrolled in preparatory one-year course.

=== Doctoral studies programmes ===
Foreign citizens without knowledge of the Russian language are enrolled in preparatory one-year course.

== Faculties and Institutes ==
The following are the Faculties and Institutes of the University:

- Faculty of Biology
- Faculty of Chemistry
- Faculty of Ecology
- Faculty of Economics
- Faculty of Journalism
- Faculty of History and Philology
- Faculty of Eurasia and East
- Faculty of Extra Mural and Distant Education
- Faculty of Fundamental Medicine
- Faculty of Linguistics and Translation
- Faculty of Mathematics
- Faculty of Physics
- Faculty of Psychology and Pedagogy
- Institute of Economics of Industry, Business and Administration
- Institute of Information Technologies
- Institute of International Education
- Institute of Law
- Institute of Professional Development and Retraining
- Laboratory of Quantum Topology
- Management Faculty
- Russian language Courses

== International cooperation ==
Faculty of Eurasia and East has more than 20 foreign partner universities, such as Shenyang Normal University, Hebei University of Economics and Business, Liaocheng University, Ehime University, Tashkent State University of Oriental Studies, Shenyang University, L. N. Gumilyov Eurasian National University, and others.

The academic journal "The Sign. Problematic Areas of Media Education" by the Faculty of Journalism of the Chelyabinsk State University has been included in the European Reference Index of the Humanities and the Social Sciences (ERIH PLUS) which is a reference database for the humanities and the social sciences.

== Rankings ==
- 1 in RAEX Ural Federal District Universities Rating 2023
- 28-37 in Superjob Russian universities rating by salaries in economics and finances 2023
- 32-33 in Rating of publication activity of Russian universities (section Mathematics) according to analytical center "Expert" 2022
- 37 in Vladimir Potanin Foundation Universities Rating 2022
- 40 in Forbes Russian Universities Rankings 2020
- 46 (among Russian universities) in Webometrics Ranking of World Universities 2023
- 47-59 in Superjob Russian universities rating by salaries in IT 2023
- 56 (among Russian universities) in Nature Index 2021
- 61 in Media activity university rating 2023
- 83 (among Russian universities) in SCImago Institutions Rankings 2022
- 83 in HeadHunter Best Regional Russian Universities Rating 2020/21
- Top 100 in National Aggregated Rating of Russian Universities 2023
- 110-134 (among Russian universities) in QS Emerging Europe & Central Asia Rankings 2022
- 152 in HeadHunter Best Russian Universities Rating 2022/23
- 171-173 in Interfax National Universities Rating 2023
- Top 10% in Global Aggregated Rating of Universities 2024
