= Hebei University of Economics and Business =

Public University in Hebei, China

Coordinates: 38°7′58.11″N 114°29′20.96″E

- 河北经贸大学
- Seal of the University
- Motto: 严谨为师 勤奋为学 诚信为人
- Type: Public university
- Established: 1953; 73 years ago
- President: Huang Sheng (黄晟)
- Vice-president: Zhang Xiushan (张秀山)
- Academic staff: 1800
- Students: 21,000
- Location: Shijiazhuang, Hebei, China
- Campus: Urban, 433.26 acres
- Colors: Blue
- Website: en.hueb.edu.cn

The Hebei University of Economics and Business (HUEB; 河北经贸大学) is a provincial public university in Shijiazhuang, Hebei, China. It is affiliated with the Province of Hebei and sponsored by the provincial government.

== History ==
=== Hebei Trade & Finance Institute (since 1953) ===
Hebei Trade & Finance Institute traces its roots back to the establishment of the Hebei Provincial Supply and Marketing Society Cooperative School in Shijiazhuang in 1953. In 1958, it was renamed as the "Hebei Province School of Business and Technical Cadres." Following a merger with the Provincial Grain School in 1959, it was transformed into the "Hebei Province School of Finance and Trade Technical Cadres." Building upon this foundation in 1960, the "Hebei Province School of Commerce" was established, but due to historical reasons, it ceased operations after 1965. The institution was re-established as the "Hebei Province School of Commerce" in 1973. Expanding on this, the Hebei College of Finance and Trade was founded in 1978 on the basis of the Hebei Province School of Commerce, and it was renamed the Hebei Trade & Finance Institute in 1984.

=== Hebei College of Trade & Economics (since 1968) ===
Hebei Provincial Hutuo River Five-Seven Cadre School in September 1968

The history of Hebei College of Trade & Economics dates back to the establishment of the Hebei Provincial Hutuo River Five-Seven Cadre School in September 1968. This was later converted into the Hebei Provincial Cadre School in 1979. Building on the foundation of the Provincial Cadre School in 1982, Hebei Construction Institute was established. It underwent transformations and was renamed Hebei Institute of Economic Management Cadres in 1983. In 1987, the Hebei Provincial Administrative College was founded, merging with Hebei Institute of Economic Management Cadres. The year 1988 marked the revival of the Hebei Provincial Socialist College, co-located with Hebei Institute of Economic Management Cadres. In 1992, Hebei Institute of Economic Management Cadres jointly established Hebei Provincial Township Enterprise College with the Provincial Township Enterprise Bureau. Then, in 1994, Hebei College of Trade & Economics was founded based on the foundation of Hebei Institute of Economic Management Cadres.

=== Hebei Commerce College (since 1956) ===
The origins of Hebei Commerce College can be traced back to the establishment of the "Hebei Provincial Business Cadre School" in 1956. Following a restructure in 1959, it became the "Hebei Provincial School of Finance and Trade Cadres." It was renamed once again as the "Hebei Provincial Business Cadre School" in 1963. Due to specific circumstances, enrollment was temporarily suspended in 1965. In 1982, the Hebei Provincial Business Cadre School was reestablished and operated at the same location as the Hebei Provincial School of Commerce. This institution underwent changes and was renamed the "Hebei Business Vocational College" in 1984. Its name was changed once more in 1992 to become the "Hebei Commerce College".

=== Merger and the Establishment of Hebei University of Economics and Business ===
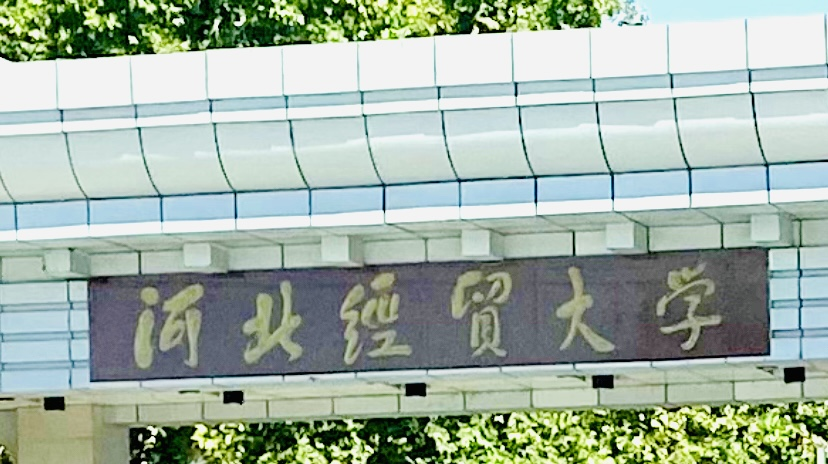
South Gate of HUEB with the name inscribed by Jiang Zemin in 1995

Hebei University of Economics and Business (HUEB) was established in 1995 under approval by the State Education Commission and through combination of three former colleges(Hebei Trade & Finance Institute, Hebei College of Trade & Economics and Hebei Commerce College).

On June 6, 1995, Jiang Zemin, then General Secretary of the CPC Central Committee and the President of China, inscribed the name of HUEB.

HUEB is one of the key universities in Hebei Province and it offers degree programs both at undergraduate and postgraduate levels.

== Academics ==
=== Research ===
From 2017 to 2022, Hebei University of Economics and Business has been active in the field of research, taking on more than 90 projects funded by the national social science fund, natural fund, and the Ministry of Education. In addition to these, they have been involved in over 1500 other various academic programs. The funding for these research projects has exceeded CN¥120 million.

=== Economic Research Center ===
In 2007, the monograph Service Industry Competitiveness published by Economic Research Center won the Hebei Provincial Social Science Outstanding Achievement Award. The Hebei Industrial Competitiveness Report released every year has become an important basis for Hebei Province to formulate the Eleventh Five-Year Plan.

=== Academic Journals Managed by HUEB ===
==== Journal of Hebei University of Economics and Business ====
Journal of the Hebei University of Economics and Business is a comprehensive economic, academic journal published at home and abroad, founded in 1980. It is now a bimonthly journal, published on the 15th of every month. Journal of Hebei University of Economics and Business has been selected as a national Chinese core journal, Chinese Social Sciences Citation Index (CSSCI) source journal (extended version), China Humanities and Social Sciences Comprehensive Evaluation AMI core journal. The editor-in-chief is Mr. Peng Jianqiang, Vice President of Hebei University of Economics and Business.

==== Economy and Management ====
Economy and Management was founded in 1986; at present, this publication is a bimonthly magazine sponsored by HUEB, mainly publishes economic and management research papers. It is originally the Hebei Economic Management Cadre College Journal. The original unit in charge of the journal is the Organization Department of Hebei Provincial Party Committee, and then adjusted to the sponsorship of Hebei University of Economics and Business and the Department of Education of Hebei.

== Education Quality ==
=== National Ranking ===
In the Wu Shulian Ranking(Chinese University Ranking), HUEB ranked 399th nationally.

HUEB's performance in the Shanghai Ranking(Academic Ranking of World Universities) China Financial Universities Ranking and its overall national standing have shown consistent trends over the years:

- In the Shanghai Ranking China Financial Universities Ranking, HUEB secured the ▼27th position in China in 2023.
- Nationally, HUEB's reference ranking remained stable at 360th position in recent years.

Shanghai Ranking China Financial Universities Ranking of HUEB
Year	2020	2021	2022	2023
Ranking	22	▲20	▼21	▼27

=== Student Experience ===
The highlight of the comprehensive survey by Shanghai Ranking in 2023
Aspect	Satisfaction / Approval Rate	National Ranking Percentile
Strong teaching & research quality	▼40% ~ 45%	Top 50%
Extensive library resources	▲60% ~ 65%	Top 25%
Teachers are knowledgeable	▲55% ~ 60%	Top 25%
Students proud to be part of HUEB	▼50% ~ 55%	Top 50%
Alumni Support	▼60% ~ 65%	Top 50%
Campus safety assurance	▼55% ~ 60%	Top 50%
Closing expectation-reality gap	▼40% ~ 45%	Below average
Note: ▲ and ▼ means the movement compared with previous year's data.

=== Fight for Doctoral Degree Conferring Right ===
Universities in China have to pass strict examination system to obtain doctoral degree conferring right. HUEB currently has no right to confer doctoral degrees, unlike neighboring universities such as Shandong University of Finance and Economics, Shanxi University of Finance and Economics, and Tianjin University of Finance and Economics. HUEB's subject offerings are limited to finance and economics, with no science or technology disciplines, making its overall academic strength relatively weak compared to other institutions in Hebei province. Other universities of similar academic quality, such as North China University of Science and Technology and Hebei University of Science and Technology, already have or are in the process of obtaining the right to confer doctoral degrees. With even lower admission requirements and academic quality, the Hebei University of Engineering in Handan has also received a special project doctoral program.

== Faculties ==
Until 2023, HUEB has 17 faculties.

- The School of Finance, established in 1980, offers majors in Finance, Fintech, Insurance, Investment, and Financial Engineering. It has been selected as a national-level first-class undergraduate major construction site in 2019.
- College of Mathematics and Statistics, established in 2001, offers undergraduate majors such as Mathematics and Applied Mathematics. They also provide programs in Information and Computational Science, Statistics, and Applied Statistics.
- The Public Administration College was established in 1983 and offers majors in Public Administration, Labor and Social Security, and Public Utility Administration.
- The School of Business Administration, founded in 1983, offers majors in Business Administration, Marketing, Human Resource Management, and Cultural Industry Management. They have been recognized as a national-level first-class undergraduate major construction site in 2019.
- The Law School, founded in 1995, offers a major in Law. It has been recognized as a national characteristic major in 2008 and became a national-level comprehensive reform pilot for majors in 2013. In 2019, it was selected as a national-level first-class undergraduate major construction site.
- The School of Culture and Communication, established in 2003, offers majors in Journalism, Radio and Television, Advertising, Publishing, Chinese Language and Literature, and Chinese International Education.
- The School of Foreign Languages, founded in 1998, offers majors in English, Japanese, Korean, Romanian, and Business English.
- The School of Information Technology, offers majors in Electronic Information Engineering, Computer Science and Technology, Network Engineering, Software Engineering, and Data Science and Big Data Technology.
- The School of Biological Science and Engineering, offers majors in Biotechnology, Food Science and Engineering, and Food Quality and Safety.
- The College of Public Finance and Taxation, offers majors in Asset Evaluation, Public Finance, and Taxation.
- The Business School, offers majors in Economics, International Economics and Trade, Trade Economics, and E-commerce.
- The School of Management Science and Engineering, offers majors in Information Management and Information Systems, Engineering Management, and Logistics Management.
- The School of Tourism, offers majors in Tourism Management, Hotel Management, Exhibition Economy and Management, and Real Estate Development and Management.
- The School of Accountancy, offers majors in Accounting, Financial Management, and Auditing. It has been recognized as a national characteristic major in 2007 and became a national-level comprehensive reform pilot for majors in 2013. In 2019, it was selected as a national-level first-class undergraduate major construction site.
- The School of Arts, offers majors in Visual Communication Design, Environmental Design, Product Design, Animation, Painting, Music Performance, and Dance Performance
- School of Marxism
- International Education School

== International Collaboration ==
=== Concordia University Chicago ===
In November 2014, the provincial Department of Education informed a reporter from Shijiazhuang Daily that the Ministry of Education had approved the collaboration between HUEB and Concordia University Chicago for an undergraduate marketing education program.

=== Woosuk University (우석대학교) ===
In February 2021, under the joint guidance of the doctoral supervisors of Woosuk University and HUEB, all 21 HUEB faculty members pursuing their doctoral degrees in South Korea graduated with their doctoral degrees. HUEB and Woosuk University in South Korea have been engaged in joint doctoral training since 2018, with 15 HUEB professors employed as joint doctoral supervisors. This program is the first overseas joint doctoral training program of HUEB. However, the quality of those doctoral degrees is questioned by some people online.

=== Confucius Institute ===
On June 13, 2007, HUEB established the Confucius Institute with Kathmandu University. HUEB also established a Confucius Institute in Zambia with the University of Zambia.

== Staff & Administration ==
=== Staff ===
As of 2022, HUEB employs over 1,800 teachers and staff members, with a majority of them being full-time teachers. There are also over 600 senior professionals and 600 individuals who either hold a PhD or are currently pursuing one.

=== Administration ===
The Charter of Hebei University of Economics and Business expresses the management system as follows:

The university implements the president accountability system under the leadership of the Hebei University of Economics and Business Committee of the Chinese Communist Party. Adhere to the leadership of the party committee, the accountability of the president, the teaching of professors, and democratic management.

Top Executives of Hebei University of Economics and Business
Role	Name
Chinese Communist Party Committee Secretary	Prof. Dr. Liu Bing
Chinese Communist Party Deputy Committee Secretary & President	Prof. Dr. Huang Sheng
Deputy Secretary of the Party Committee	Prof. Liu Jianping
Member of the Standing Party Committee & Vice-President	Prof. Dr. Yang Jintian
Member of the Standing Party Committee & Vice-President	Prof. Gao Xiaofeng
Member of the Standing Party Committee & Vice-President	Prof. Zhang Xiushan
Member of the Standing Party Committee & Vice-President	Prof. Dr. Cheng Ruifang
Member of the Standing Party Committee & Secretary of the Discipline Inspection Commission	Mr. Wang Baojun
Member of the Standing Party Committee & Vice-President	Prof. Dr. Tian Xuebin
Member of the Standing Party Committee & Vice-President	Prof. Dr. Li Guijun

== Environment ==
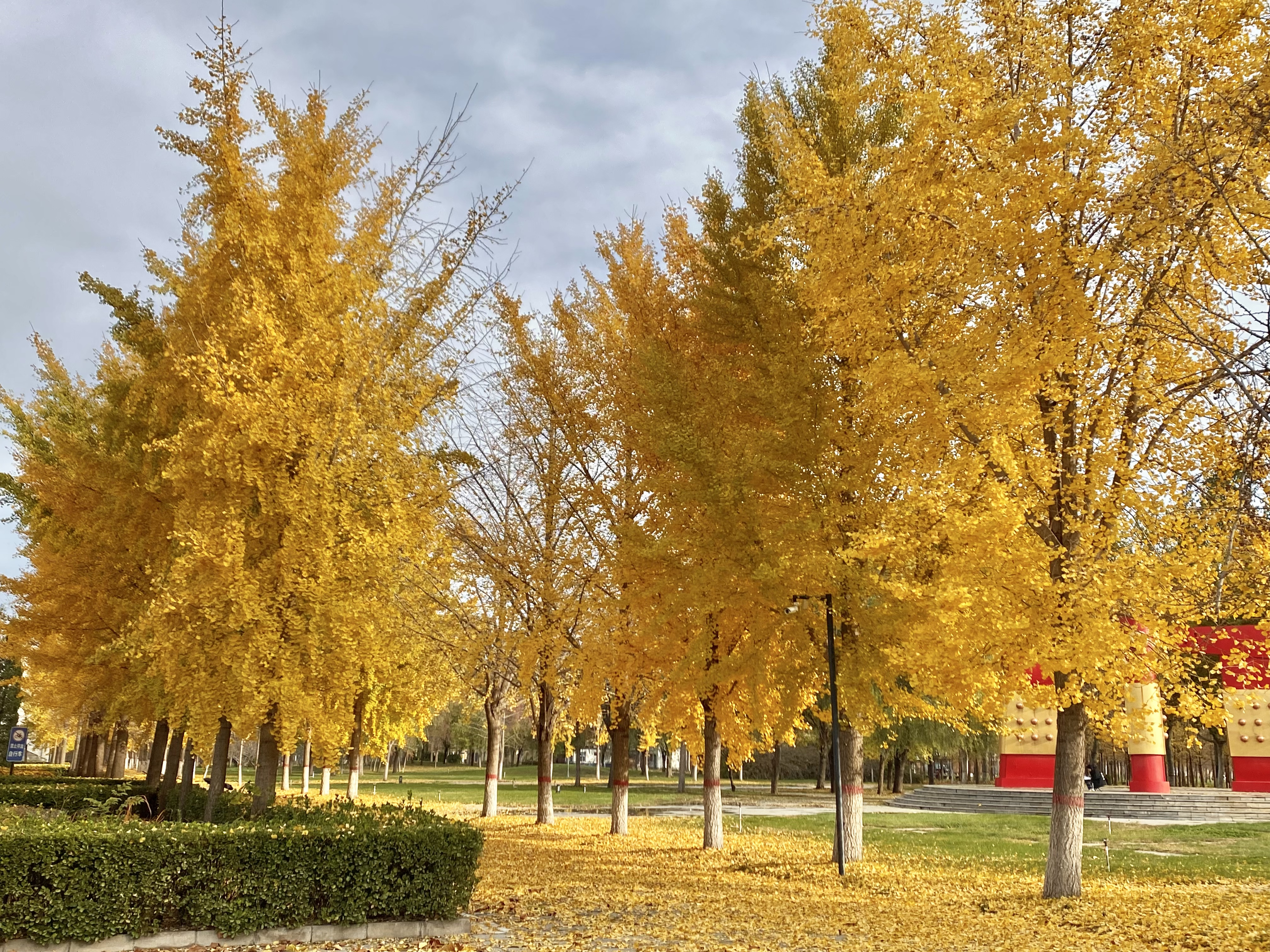
HUEB in October

The main campus is located on the south bank of the Hutuo River in the north of Shijiazhuang, occupying an area of 2,600 acres, which was the largest single university campus in Hebei Province before the 21st century, with a greening rate of up to 40 percent.
