= Hebei Institute of Physical Education =

Sports institute in Shijiazhuang, Hebei, China

Coordinates: 38.12361°N 114.50161°E

The Hebei Institute of Physical Education (Chinese: 河北体育学院; pinyin: Héběi Tǐyù Xuéyuàn) is a sports institute in Shijiazhuang, Hebei, China. Founded in 1984, the institute merged with the Hebei Sports School in 2002. It currently has about 4,700 students and a teaching staff of 450, and offers majors in physical education, sports training, social sports, traditional national sports, human body science, English, and dance. The institute is run under the aegis of the provincial government.
