= Shijiazhuang University =

University in Shijiazhuang, China

- 石家庄学院
- Type: Public university
- Established: 1956
- Faculty: 495
- Administrative staff: 829
- Students: 12,199
- Location: Shijiazhuang, Hebei, China
- Campus: urban 82 Hectares
- Website: http://www.sjzc.edu.cn/

Shijiazhuang University (Chinese: 石家庄学院; pinyin: Shíjiāzhuāng xuéyuàn) is a university in Shijiazhuang, Hebei, China.

== Campuses ==
There are two campuses: North Campus and South Campus with 82 hectares of land and 350,000 square meters of floor space.
