= Hebei University of Science and Technology =

Provincial public university in Shijiazhuang, Hebei, China

- 河北科技大学
- Former names: Hebei Institute of Chemical Technology and Light Industry; Hebei Institute of Mechano-Electric Engineering; Hebei Textile Staff & Workers University
- Type: Public university
- Established: 1996
- Students: 19,440
- Location: Shijiazhuang, Hebei, China
- Campus: Central Campus, West Campus, East Campus, Gaoxin Campus
- Website: www.hebust.edu.cn/

The Hebei University of Science and Technology (HEBUST; 河北科技大学) is a provincial public university in Shijiazhuang, Hebei, China. It is affiliated with the Province of Hebei, and funded by the provincial government.

Hebei University of Science and Technology was established in May 1996 by the merger of the original Hebei Light Chemical Engineering College, Hebei Mechanical and Electrical College, and Hebei Textile Workers University. In 2002, Hebei Textile Industry School was merged into the school. In 2021, the school received accreditation for awarding doctoral degrees.
