= Xingtai University =

University in Hebei, China

Xingtai University (Chinese: 邢台学院; pinyin: Xíngtái xuéyuàn) is a university in Hebei, China under the provincial government.
