= Hebei University of Architecture =

University in Zhangjiakou, Hebei, China

Hebei University of Architecture 河北建筑工程学院
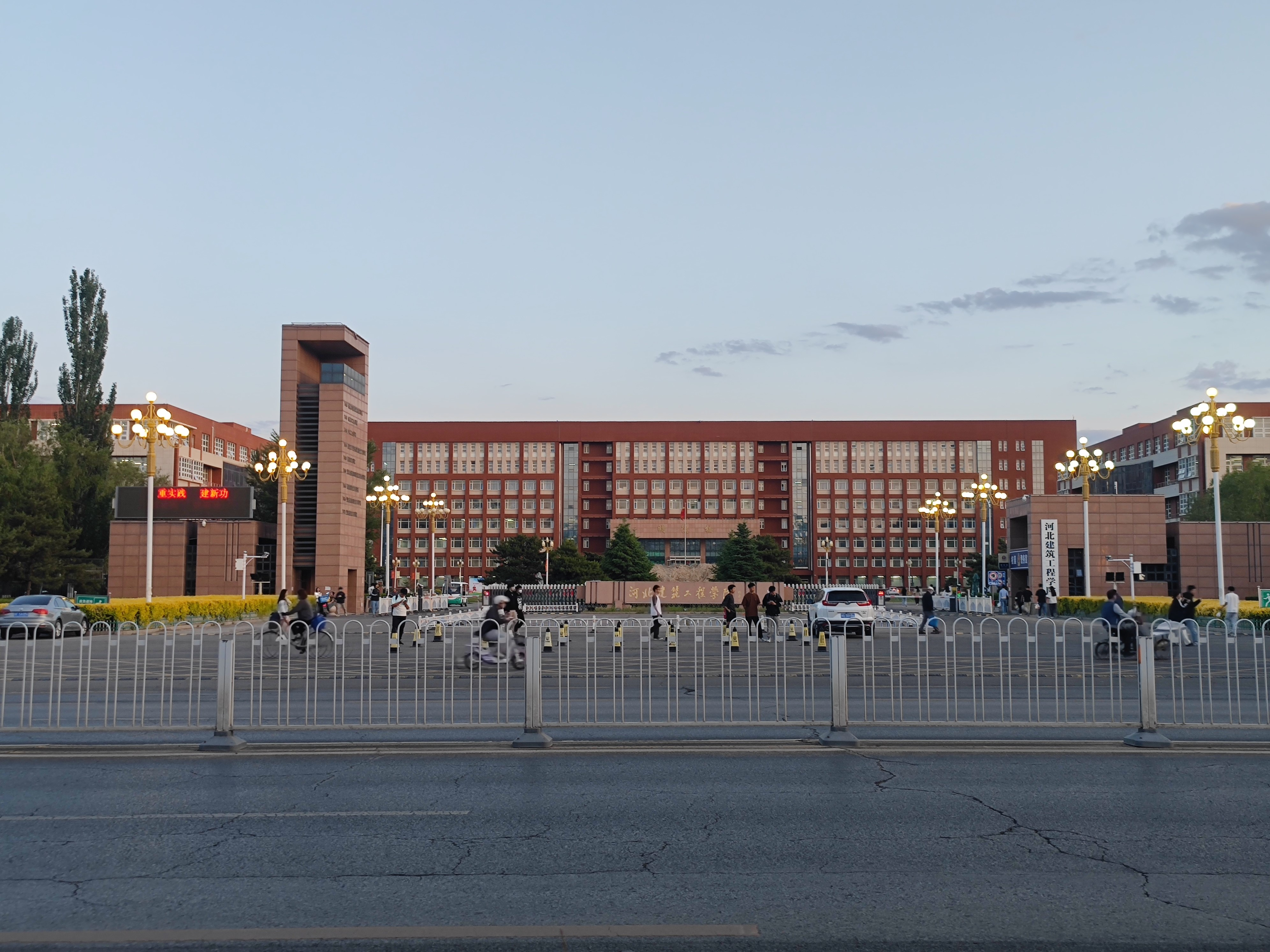
- North (Main) Gate of Hebei University of Architecture
- Motto: 艰苦朴实、勤奋进取
- Established: August 1950
- Academic staff: 762
- Students: 13,551
- Postgraduates: 599
- Location: Chaoyang West St. 13rd, Zhangjiakou, China
- Campus: Chaoyang Campus
- Website: www.hebiace.edu.cn

Hebei University of Architecture (Chinese: 河北建筑工程学院; pinyin: Héběi jiànzhù gōngchéngxué yuàn), formerly Hebei Institute of Architecture and Civil Engineering, is a university in Zhangjiakou, Hebei, China under the provincial government.

Hebei Institute of Architecture and Civil Engineering was founded in August 1950 and was initially named Zhang Jiakou Technical School (Chinese: 察哈尔工学院). In 1951, it was renamed as the Chahar Industrial Institute, and in December 1952 changed its name again to the North China Industrial Institute, under the leadership of the North China Administrative Committee. In May 1954, it became the Zhang Jiakou Architecture and Engineering School attached to the Central People's Government Construction Engineering Department. In June 1958, it was incorporated into Hebei province and changed names successively as the Zhang Jiakou Engineering Institute, Zhang Jiakou Engineering Training School, and Zhang Jiakou Architecture and Engineering School. It was approved by the State Council to be upgraded to an institution of higher learning in 1978 as Hebei Institute of Architecture and Civil Engineering. It is the only higher education institute providing instruction in both architecture and engineering in Hebei province.

In the 2000s decade, it was renamed to the Hebei University of Architecture.

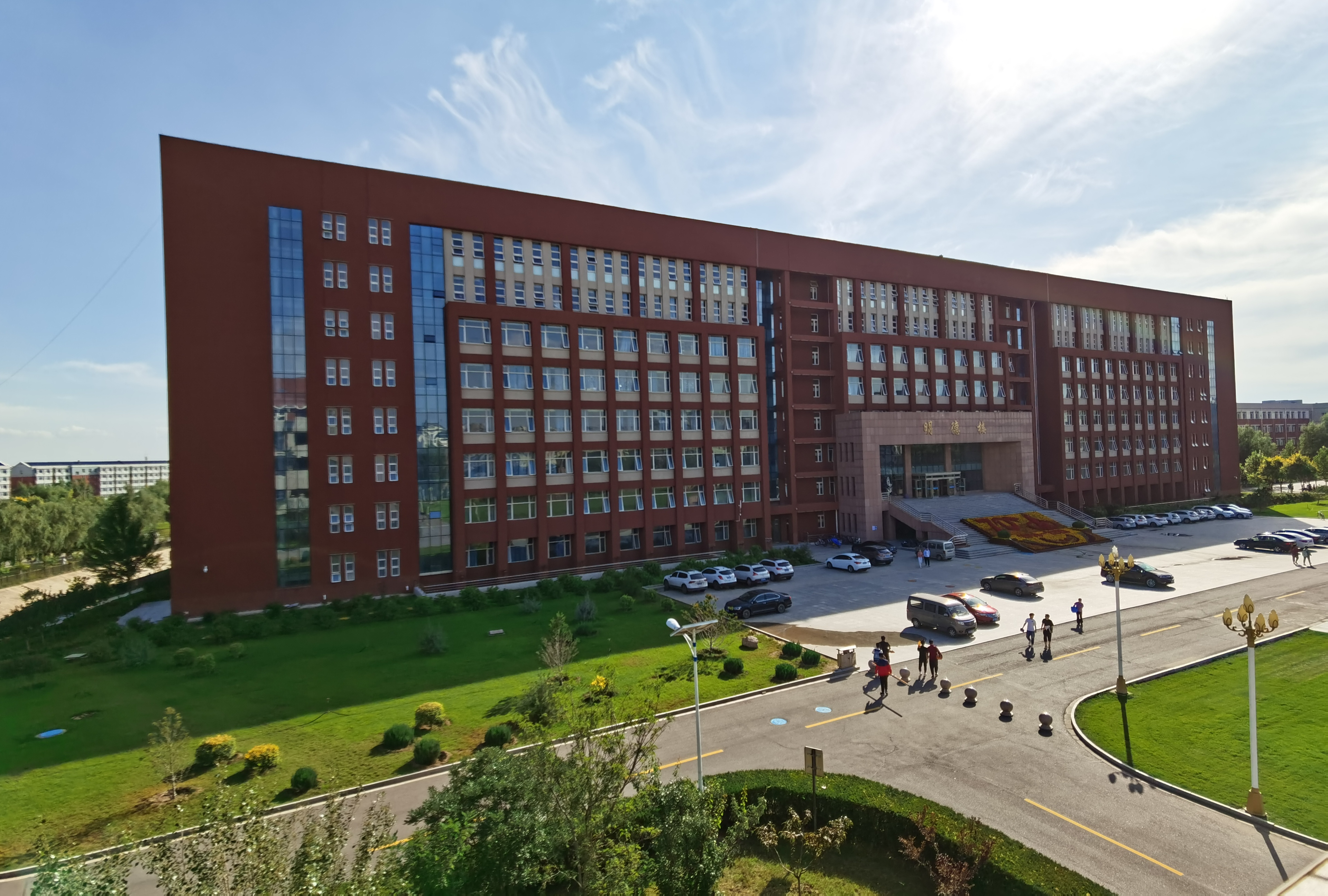
Mingde Building

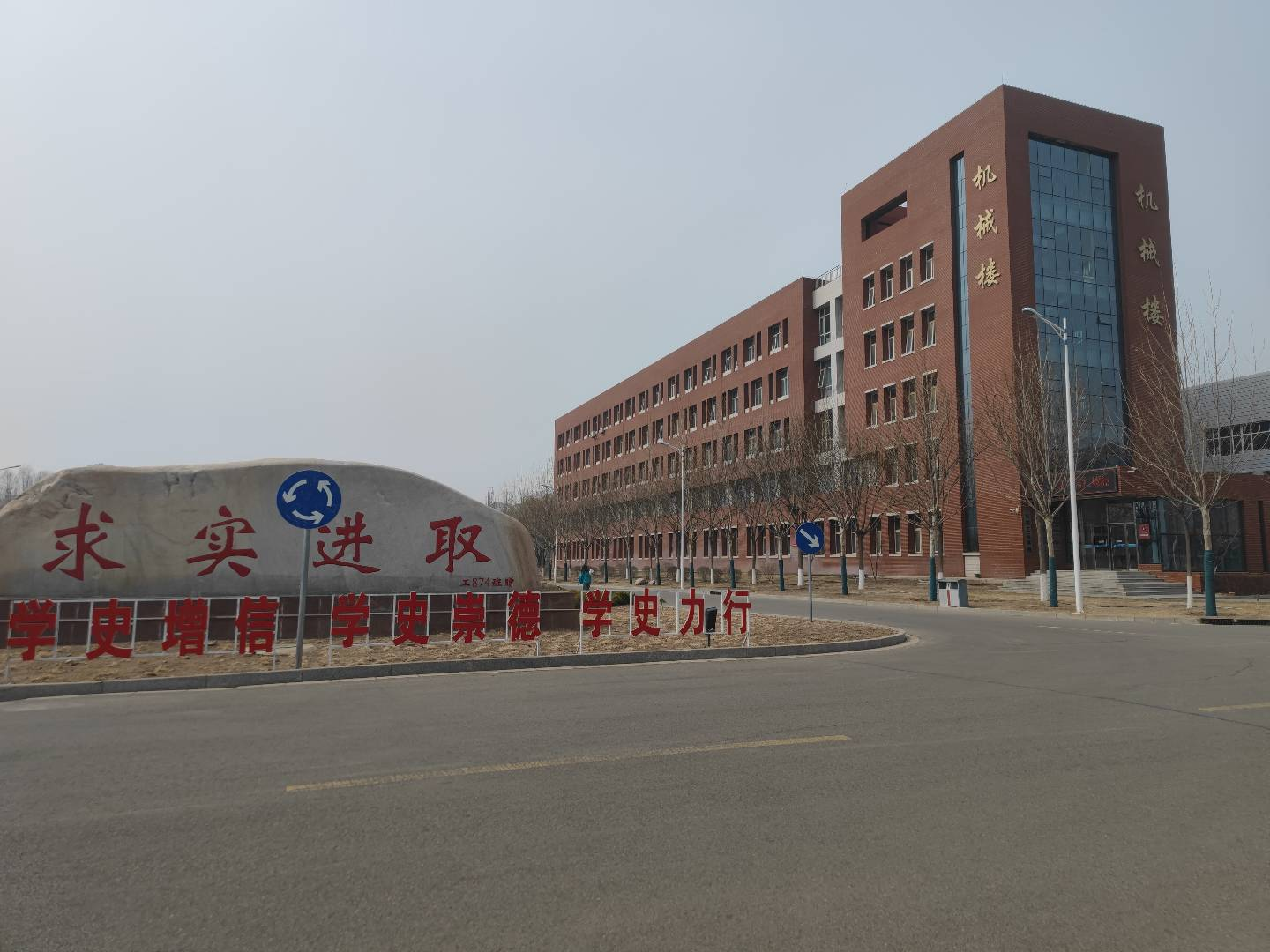
Mechanical Building

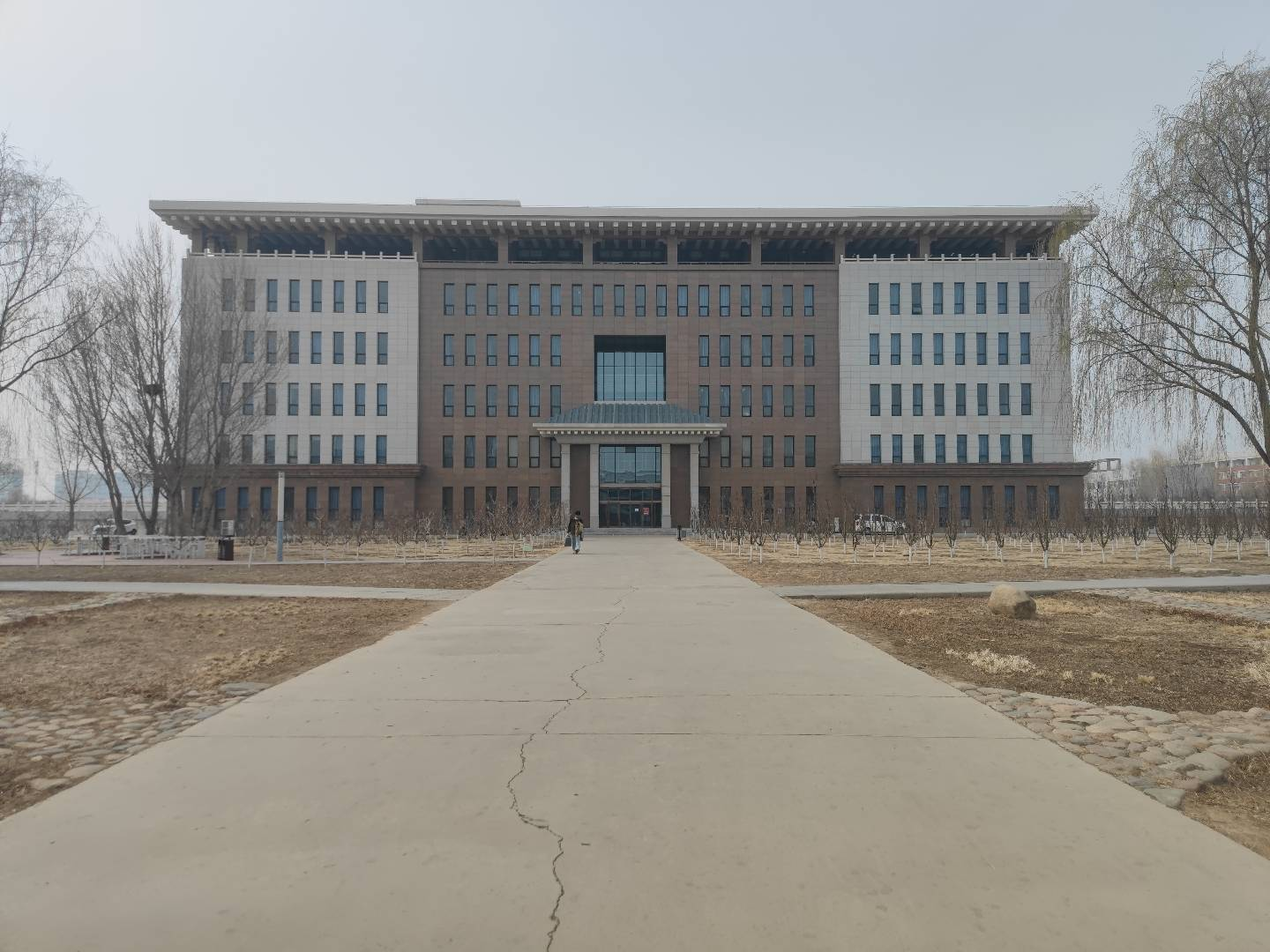
Library

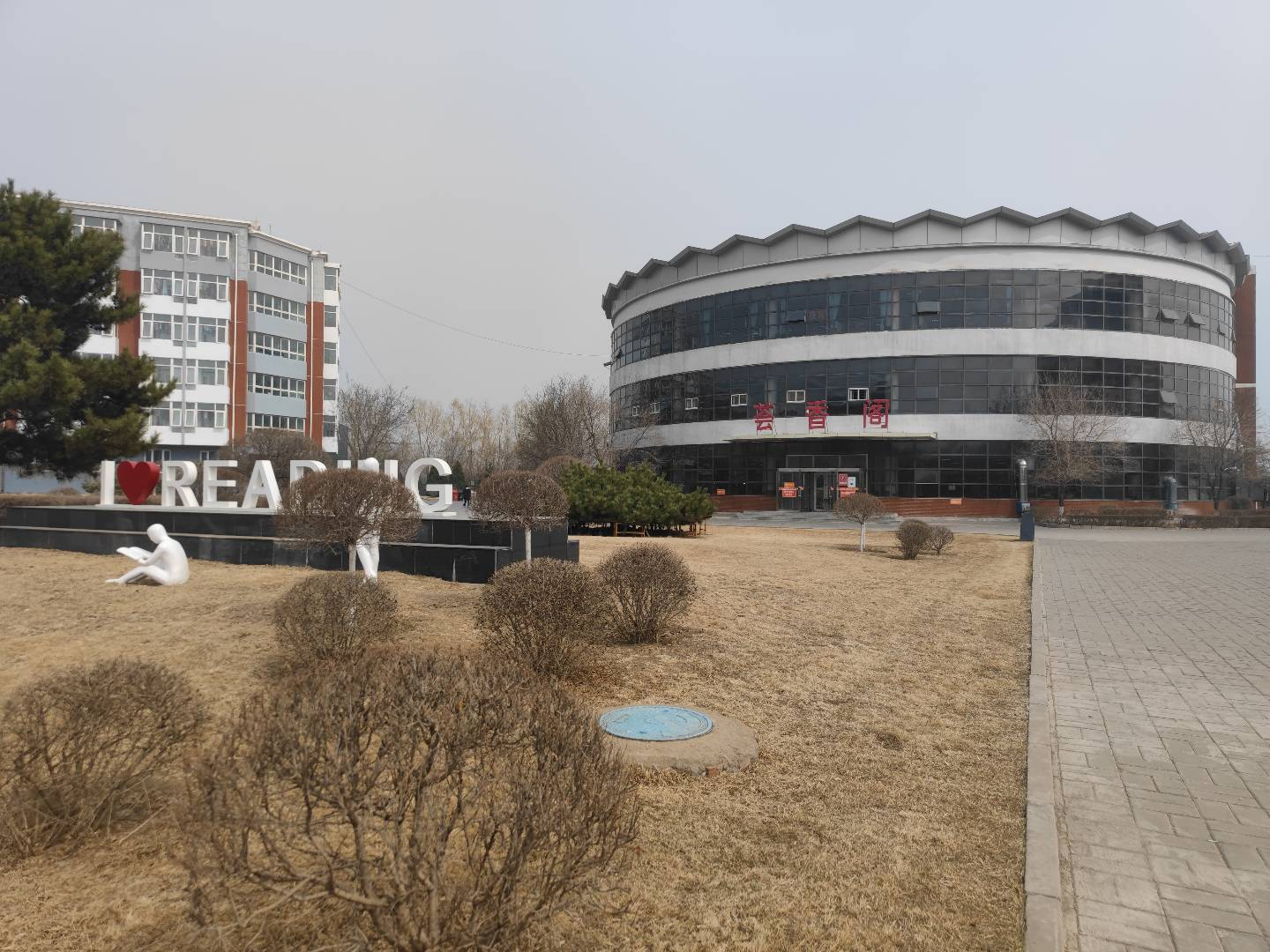
Huixiangge Canteen

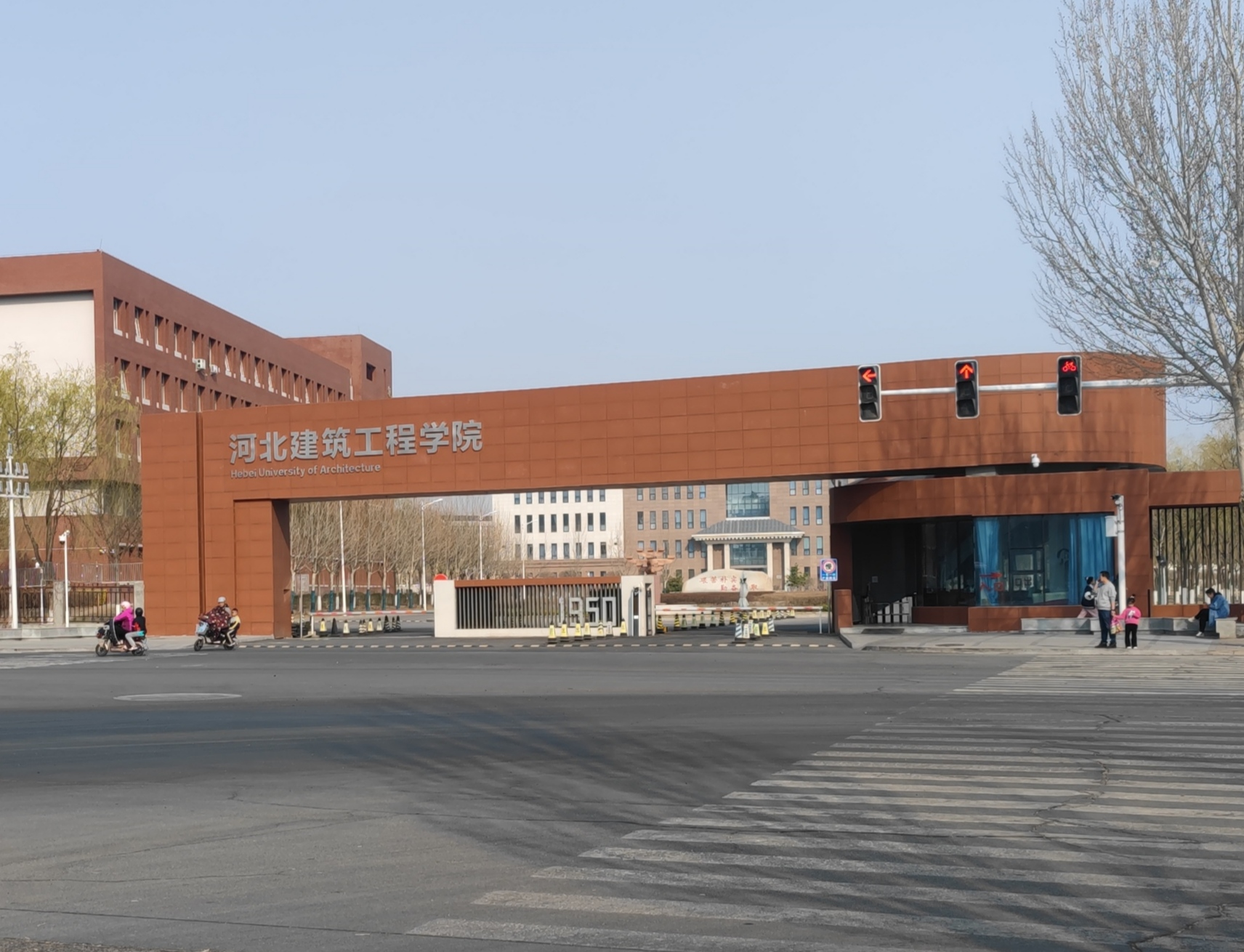
West Gate
