= Hebei Normal University of Science and Technology =

Provincial public college in Qinghuangdao, Hebei, China

- Type: Public college
- Location: Qinhuangdao, Hebei, China
- Website: www.hevttc.edu.cn

The Hebei Normal University of Science and Technology (Chinese: 河北科技师范学院; lit. 'Hebei Technology Normal College') is a provincial public college in Qinghuangdao, Hebei, China. It is affiliated with the Province of Hebei and sponsored by the provincial government. Previously a vocational technical college, the institute was granted college status in 2003. Despite its English name, the institute has not been granted university status.
