= Hebei University of Engineering =

Public College in Hebei, China

- 河北工程大学
- Former names: Hebei Institute of Architectural Science and Technology; North China Institute of Water Conservancy and Hydro-electric Power; Handan Medical College; Handan Agriculture College
- Motto: 立德立志，善学善行。
- Type: Public university
- Established: 2012
- Administrative staff: 2,235
- Location: Handan, Hebei, China
- Campus: Urban 1,560,800 square meters
- Website: http://www.hebeu.edu.cn

Hebei University of Engineering (Chinese: 河北工程大学; pinyin: Héběi Gōngchéng Dàxué) is a provincial university based in Handan, Hebei, China.

It was established in 2003 from the amalgamation of individual colleges: Hebei Institute of Architectural Science and Technology, North China Institute of Water Conservancy and Hydro-electric Power, Handan Medicine College and Handan Agriculture College.

In 2006, the Ministry of Education of China authorised the university to change its name to Hebei University of Engineering. The university now specialises in the fields of civil engineering, together with science disciplines, water power, agriculture and medicine.

== Location ==
The university has four campuses, namely Main, Zhong Hua Nan, Congtai and Mingguan, the university covers an area of 2,340 mu (1,560,800 square meters), with a building area of 830,000 square meters.

== Ranking ==
Ranking Source	Rank / Position	Notes / Context
CWUR (2025)	World # 1,987	Among ~21,462 universities globally cwur.org
U.S. News – Best Global Universities	~2,151	As per the "Mastersportal" summary for U.S. News ranking MastersPortal
Soft Science (ShanghaiRanking / 软科) — China University Rankings (Main List)	# 295 in China (2025)	This is the "Chinese Best Universities" ranking by ShanghaiRanking. shanghairanking.cn+1
Cuaa / Alumni Association Ranking (2025)	# 261 in China	Among Chinese universities, ranked 261st in 2025 by the Alumni Association ranking. Sohu
Meta-ranking (UniversityGuru)	# 366 (China) / # 345 (China)	Meta ranking among Chinese universities based on multiple sources. UniversityGuru
Scimago Institutions Rankings	75th percentile in China	Indicates it performs better than ~75% of institutions in China by Scimago's metrics

== Faculty structure ==
The university is organised into the following departments:

- School of Science
- School of Architecture
- School of Civil Engineering
- School of Urban Construction
- School of Mechanical and Electrical Engineering
- School of Resource Science
- School of Information Science and Electrical Engineering
- School of Economy and Management
- School of Humanities
- School of Natural Science
- School of Agriculture
- School of Hydraulic and Hydro-power
- School of Medicine
