= North China University of Science and Technology =

Provincial public university in Tangshan, Hebei, China

- 华北理工大学
- Former names: Hebei United University
- Motto: 明德博学，勤奋求实
- Type: Public
- Established: 1926
- Head: Liu Xiaoping
- Students: 47,126
- Location: Tangshan, Hebei, 063210, China
- Campus: 745 acres (301 ha)
- Website: ncst.edu.cn

The North China University of Science and Technology (NCST; 华北理工大学) is a provincial public university in Tangshan, Hebei, China. It is affiliated with the Province of Hebei, and co-funded by the provincial government, Ministry of Emergency Management, and SASTIND.
