= Hebei Medical University =

Public Medical School in Hebei, China

- 河北医科大学
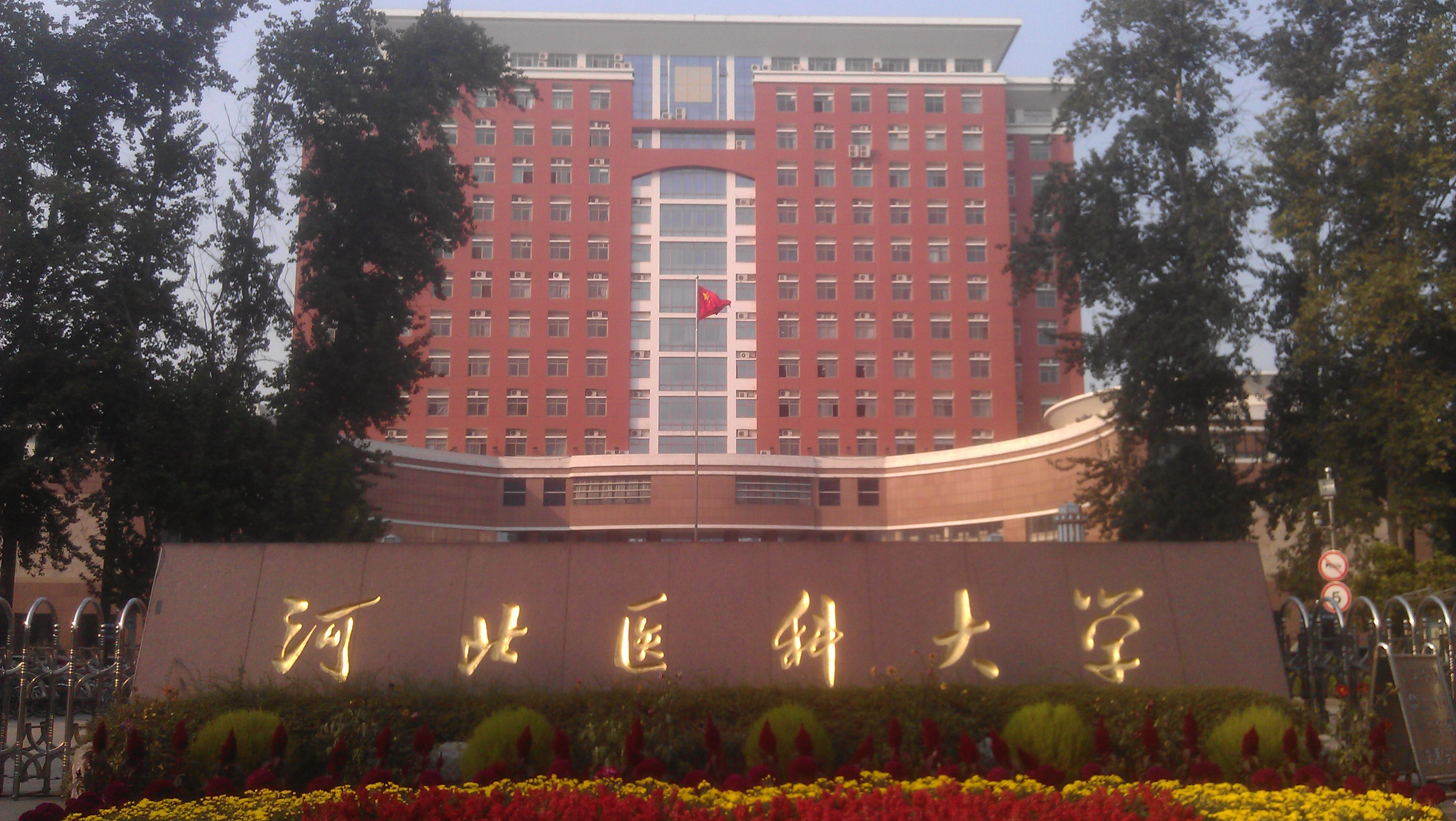
- Type: Public
- Established: 1894; 132 years ago
- Faculty: 1,333
- Students: 25,600
- Location: Shijiazhuang, Hebei, China; 38°02′44″N 114°32′07″E
- Campus: Urban
- Website: www.hebmu.edu.cn

Hebei Medical University (Chinese: 河北医科大学; pinyin: Héběi Yīkē Dàxué) is a university in Shijiazhuang, Hebei, China, under the provincial government. It was established in 1894, making it one of the oldest in China, and is an AAA graded medical school in China.

== Staff ==
The staff numbers over 7,100. Of these, 366 are professors, senior researchers and chief physicians. There are 967 associate professors.

== Students and Fees ==
There are 25,600 students.

Hebei Medical University has long history of enrolling international students from countries including the United States, Japan, Korea, Philippines, Taiwan, the UK, India, Ghana, Pakistan, Nepal and Bangladesh, Morocco, South Africa, Thailand.In collaboration with International Education College of Jiangxi University of Traditional Chinese Medicine, a total of more than 300 international students have already completed their Bachelor of Medicine, Bachelor of Surgery (MBBS) from the university in 2010–2011. Currently, there are around 200 students studying undergraduate MBBS in Hebei Medical University, International Education College as of 2026. The fees for International Students studying undergraduate under the International Medical College of Hebei Medical University typically pay 36,000 yuan as a tuition fee and a dormitory fee of approximately 4000-5000 yuan depending on the number of occupants of a room as of 2026.

== Colleges ==
After 80 years development and evolution, Hebei Medical University has become a comprehensive medical university composed of western medicine, traditional medicine, pharmacy and other subjects. Now there are 14 colleges, and 15 specialties. The primary campus is in Changan District and is used for the undergraduate students of the following courses: MBBS, Pharmacology, Nursing etc. Another campus is located in the Jianhua district and is used by students who are in their final years of study. There is a new campus under construction in the city of Zhengding and is expected to be put into use around 2028.

== Affiliated hospitals ==
The university has six affiliated hospitals, in which there are 4,566 in-patient beds. Four hospitals have been granted the status of "first-class hospitals in the third category". In addition, it also has 77 teaching hospitals and practice bases providing students with sites of clinical teaching, specialist teaching and practice.

== Achievements ==
It carried out the first finger transplantation surgery in China, and made the first diagnosis in the world of acute motor axonal neuropathy.

It has 9 subjects and 4 laboratories assessed at advanced provincial level, and 6 research institutes at provincial level. The Chinese Academy of Preventive Medical Science has set up its Hebei Academic Branch in this university. Each year nearly 200 research projects are undertaken. In addition three national and eight provincial academic periodicals have been compiled and published here.

Hebei Medical University has started the MBBS programme in 2004 and enrolled 200 students successfully from India and Nepal, and in 2005 enrolled 200 more students from India. Both batches have graduated in 2010 and 2011 respectively.

The MBBS programme is taught in English as well as many other courses, something that other universities cannot do, such as Traditional Chinese Medicine, Acupuncture and Massage, Clinical Medicine, Clinical Medicine of Integration of Traditional Chinese Medicine and Western Medicine, Stomatology, Anesthesiology, Preventive Medicine, Medical Imaging, Advanced Nursing Science, Chinese Pharmacology, Pharmacology, Pharmaceutics.

In the past few years, Hebei Medical University has become an important window of cultural and economic exchange with the world. It has established closer cooperation with about ten medical colleges and research institutes in Japan, South Korea, U.S.A and France successively. 24 foreign experts have been invited to take honorary positions in this university. Over 400 experts and professors have been sent abroad to give lectures or attend international academic conferences. Nearly 100 young teachers are studying assiduously abroad for PhD degrees. Its cooperation with the domestic colleges and universities has grown tremendously over the years.Hebei Medical University is turning on a new look and making great efforts to establish a superior comprehensive medical university with local characteristics to meet the needs of socialist construction.
