= Li Peng (disambiguation) =

Li Peng (1928–2019) was a Chinese politician who served as the premier of China from 1987 to 1998.

Li Peng or Peng Li may also refer to:

- Peng Li (professor), Chinese-born researcher at Texas A&M University, USA
- Li Peng (table tennis) (born 1955), Chinese table tennis player
- Li Peng (footballer) (born 1990), Chinese association footballer
- Li Peng (physiologist) (born 1965), Chinese physiologist
