= Henan Provincial People's Hospital =

Coordinates: 34°46′26.73″N 113°41′16.84″E

Henan Provincial People's Hospital (Chinese: 河南省人民医院)
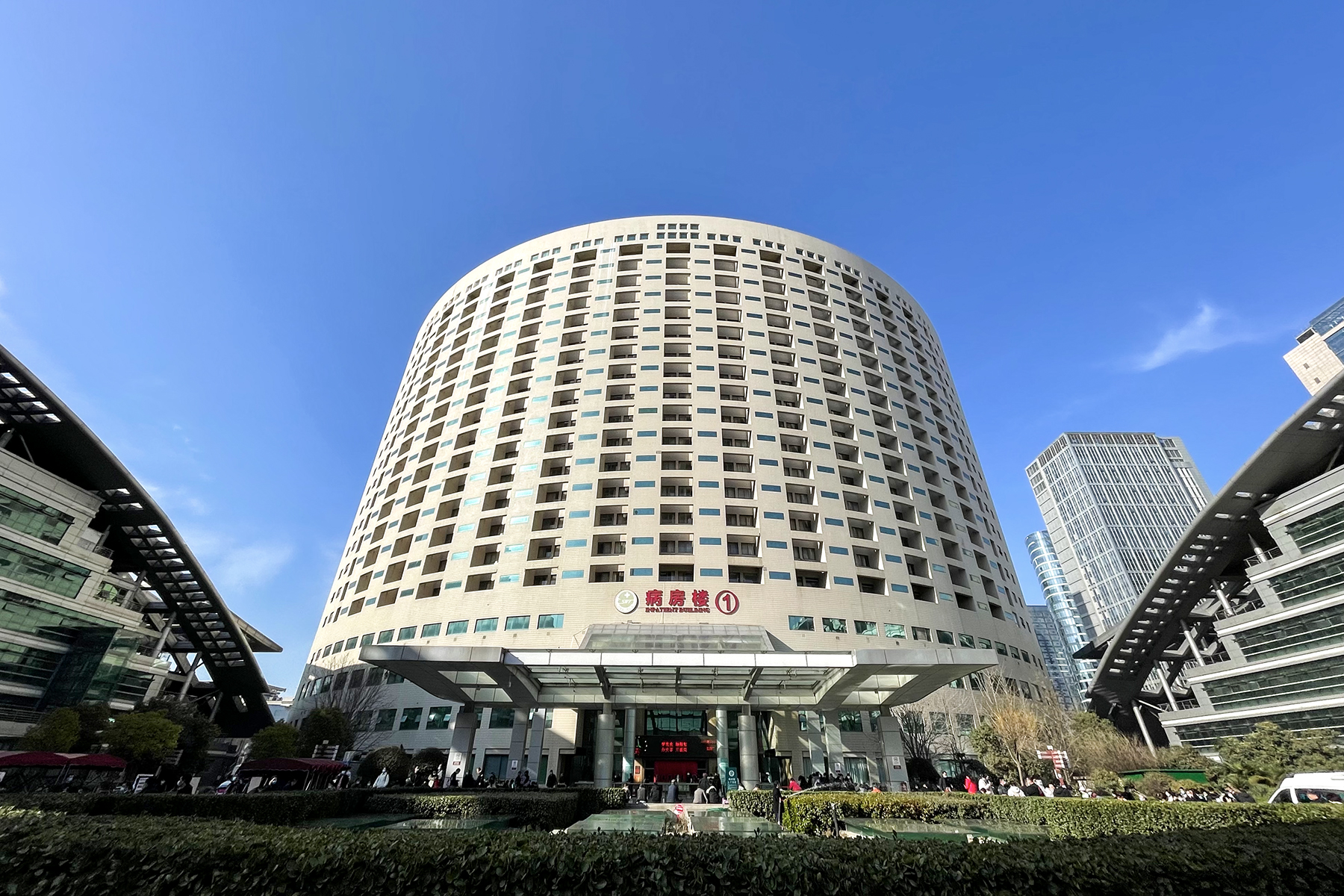

Geography
- Location: Zhengzhou City, Henan Province, People's Republic of China

Organisation
- Type: Comprehensive, teaching hospital
- Affiliated university: Zhengzhou University

Services
- Standards: 3A

History
- Founded: 1904

Links
- Website: www.hnsrmyy.net

Henan Provincial People's Hospital, or "People's Hospital of Zhengzhou University", is a century-old public hospital in Zhengzhou, capital city of Henan Province of China. Founded in 1904, the hospital is now a large national top-100 Grade A tertiary hospital integrating medical treatment, education and research.

== History ==
Henan Provincial People's Hospital was originally the "Kaifeng Gospel Hospital" founded in Kaifeng of Henan Province in 1904 by the China Inland Mission.

In February 1950, the hospital was renamed "Henan Provincial People's Hospital".

In March 1955, the hospital moved to Zhengzhou City with the Henan Provincial Government.

In 1993, the hospital was approved as one of the first batch of Grade A tertiary hospitals in the country.

In 2010, the hospital was also named "Zhengzhou University People's Hospital".

In 2012, it became a hospital jointly built by the Ministry [of Health] and the Province.

In 2016, the hospital cooperated with Henan University to jointly build the Henan University School of Medicine.

In 2017, the hospital became a top-100 hospital in China.

In 2019, the hospital was included in the system of directly affiliated hospitals of Zhengzhou University.

In 2022, the hospital was selected as one of the first batch of research-oriented hospitals in China.

In 2024, the hospital's annual revenue exceeded 10 billion yuan RMB.

== Subordinate Hospitals ==
The following hospitals or campuses are subordinated to Henan Provincial People's Hospital:

Fuwai Central China Cardiovascular Hospital

Henan Provincial Eye Hospital

Henan Provincial People's Hospital First Affiliated Hospital

Henan Provincial People's Hospital Second Affiliated Hospital

Henan Provincial Reproductive Hospital

Henan Provincial Cerebrovascular Hospital

Henan Provincial People's Hospital Southeast Branch

Henan Provincial People's Hospital Pingyuan Hospital

== Other information ==
Henan Provincial People's Hospital has 17 national key clinical specialties and 13 provincial key clinical specialties. It boasts the only national-level major infectious disease prevention and control base and a flagship hospital integrating traditional Chinese and Western medicine.

There are 1,032 professors, 10 distinguished academicians, and over 3,000 patient beds. The hospital is strong at Ophthalmology, Cardiology, Neurology and General Surgery. And medical cost here is much cheaper than China's first-line cities.

The hospital successfully performed the province's first heart transplant surgery and the first lung transplant surgery, ranking fourth in the country in terms of surgical volume.

In scientific research, the hospital published 54 papers listed in Nature Index for the time frame of 1 June 2025 - 30 May 2026, ranking 349th globally and 145th in China.

In the 2024 China Hospital and Specialty Reputation Ranking, Henan Provincial People's Hospital ranked A (top-100) nationally.

Location: 7 Weiwu Road, Zhengzhou, Henan Province, China.

== Photo Gallery ==
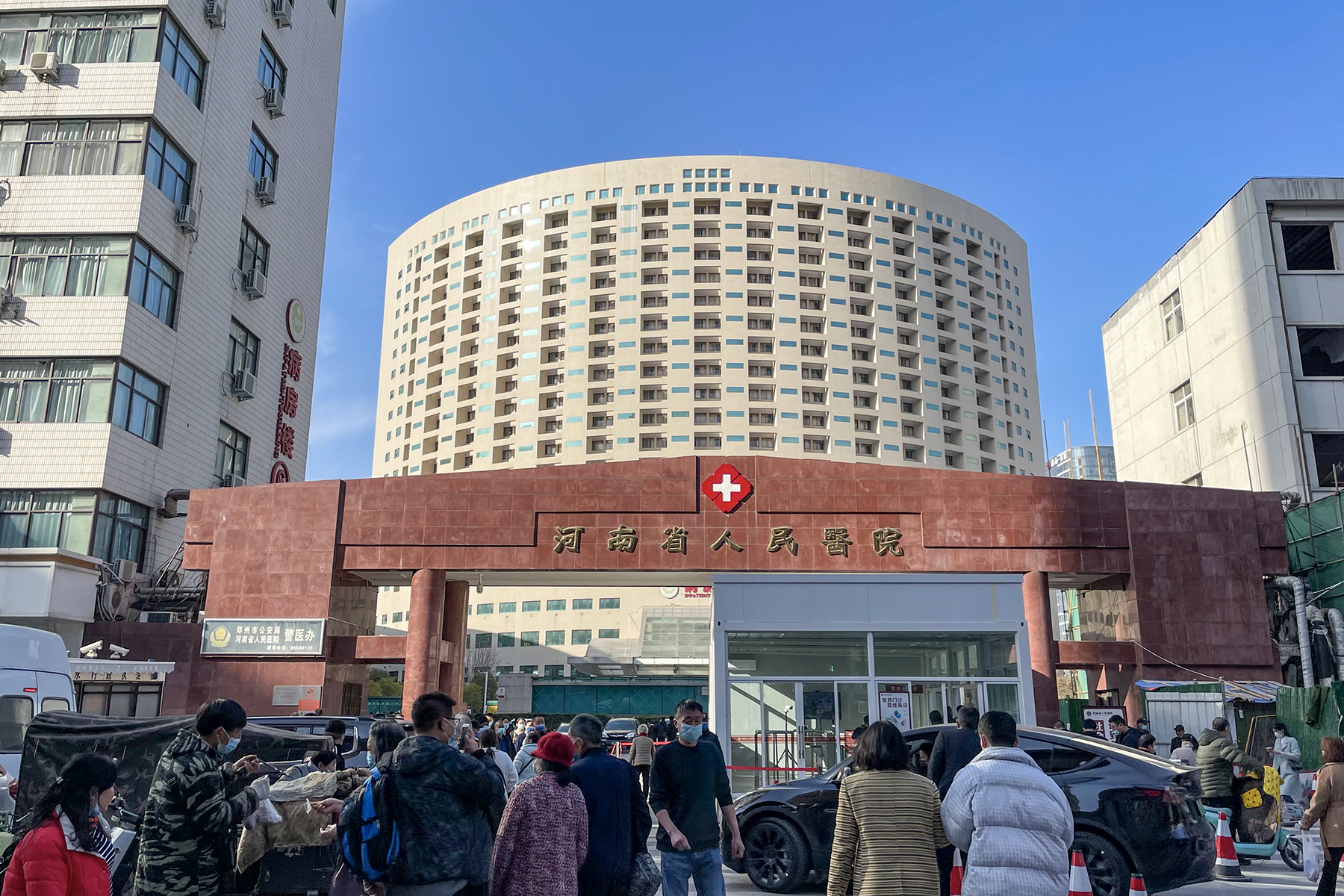
South Gate and Ward Building No. 1

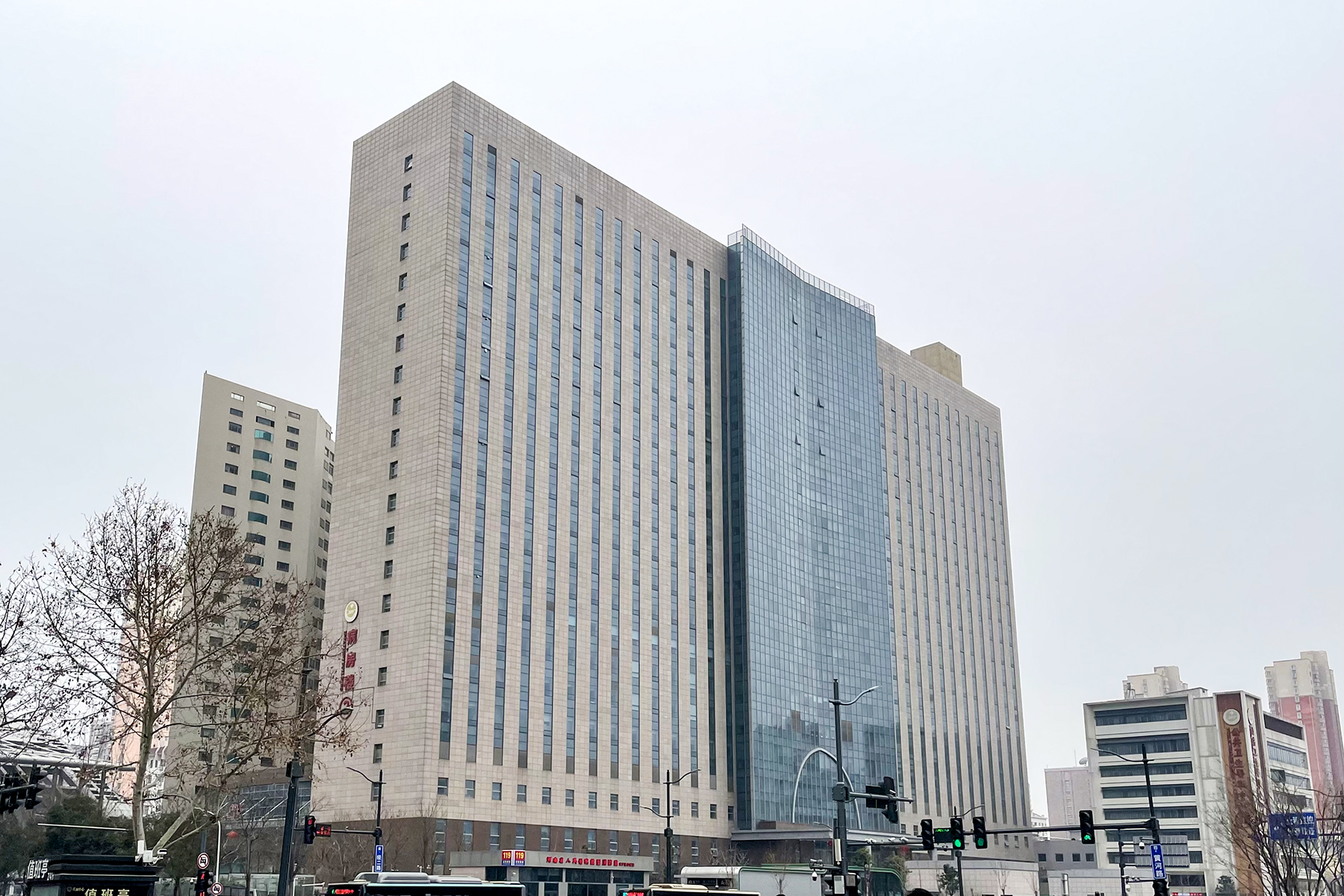
Ward Building No. 2

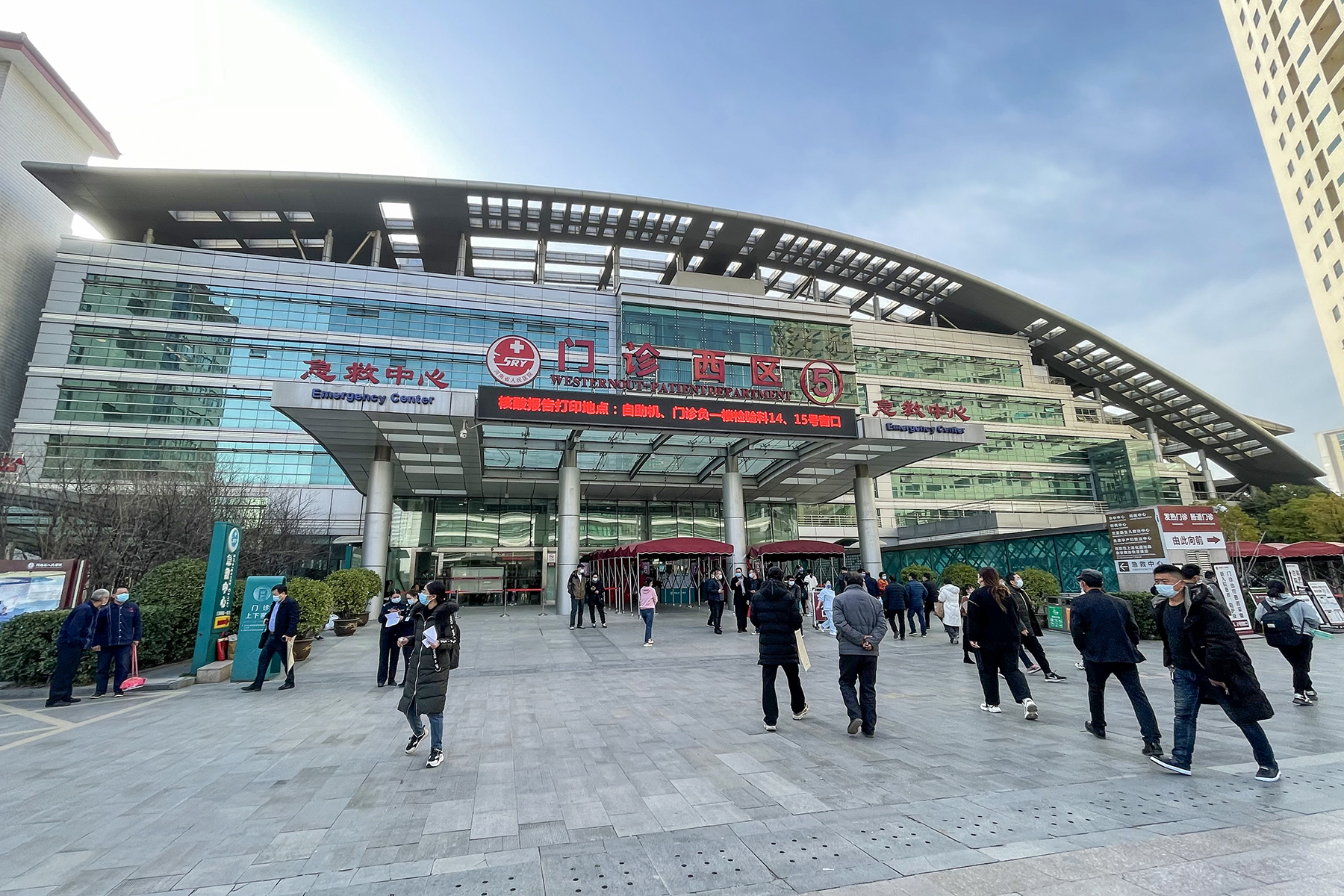
Outpatient West Wing and Emergency Center

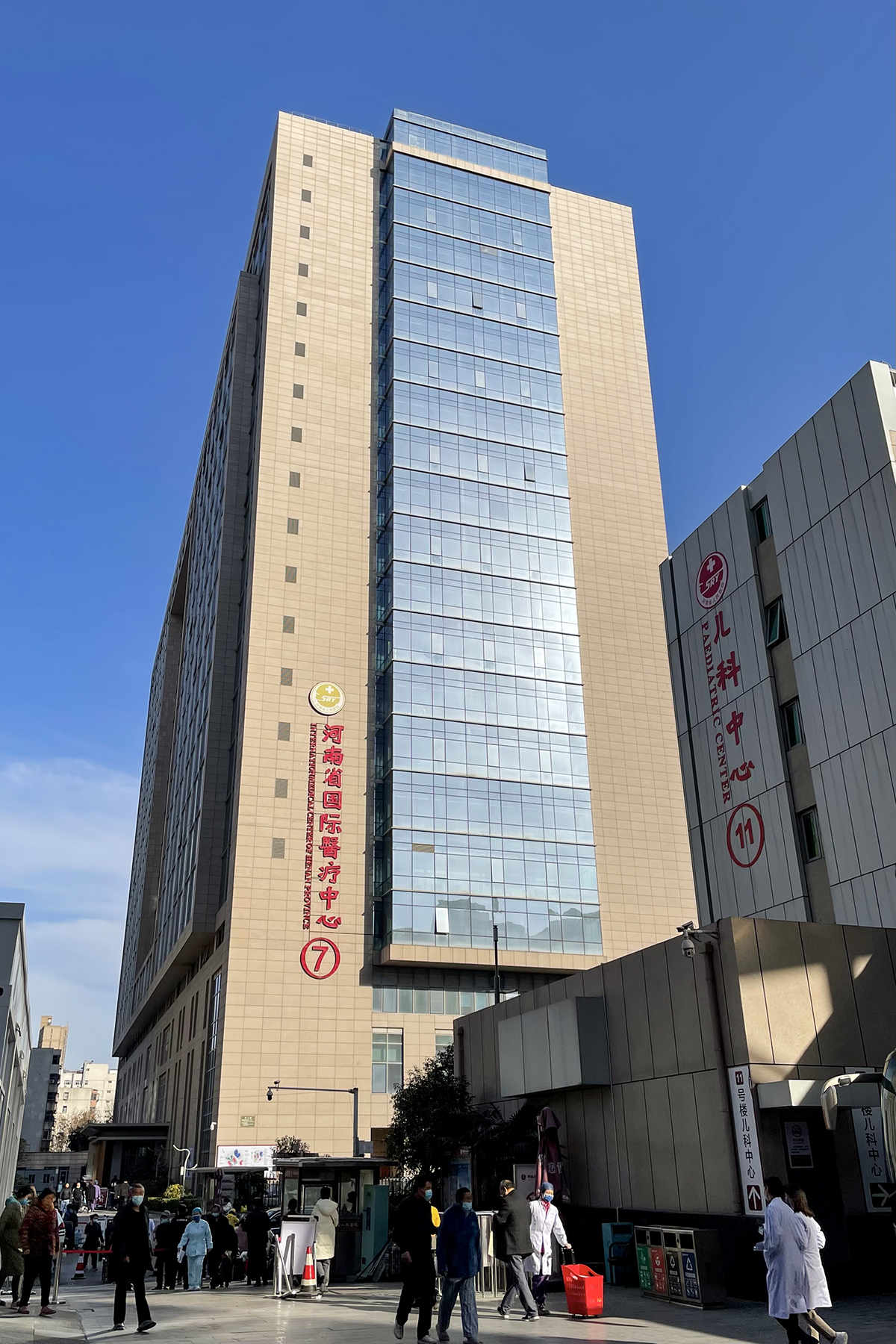
Henan International Medical Center

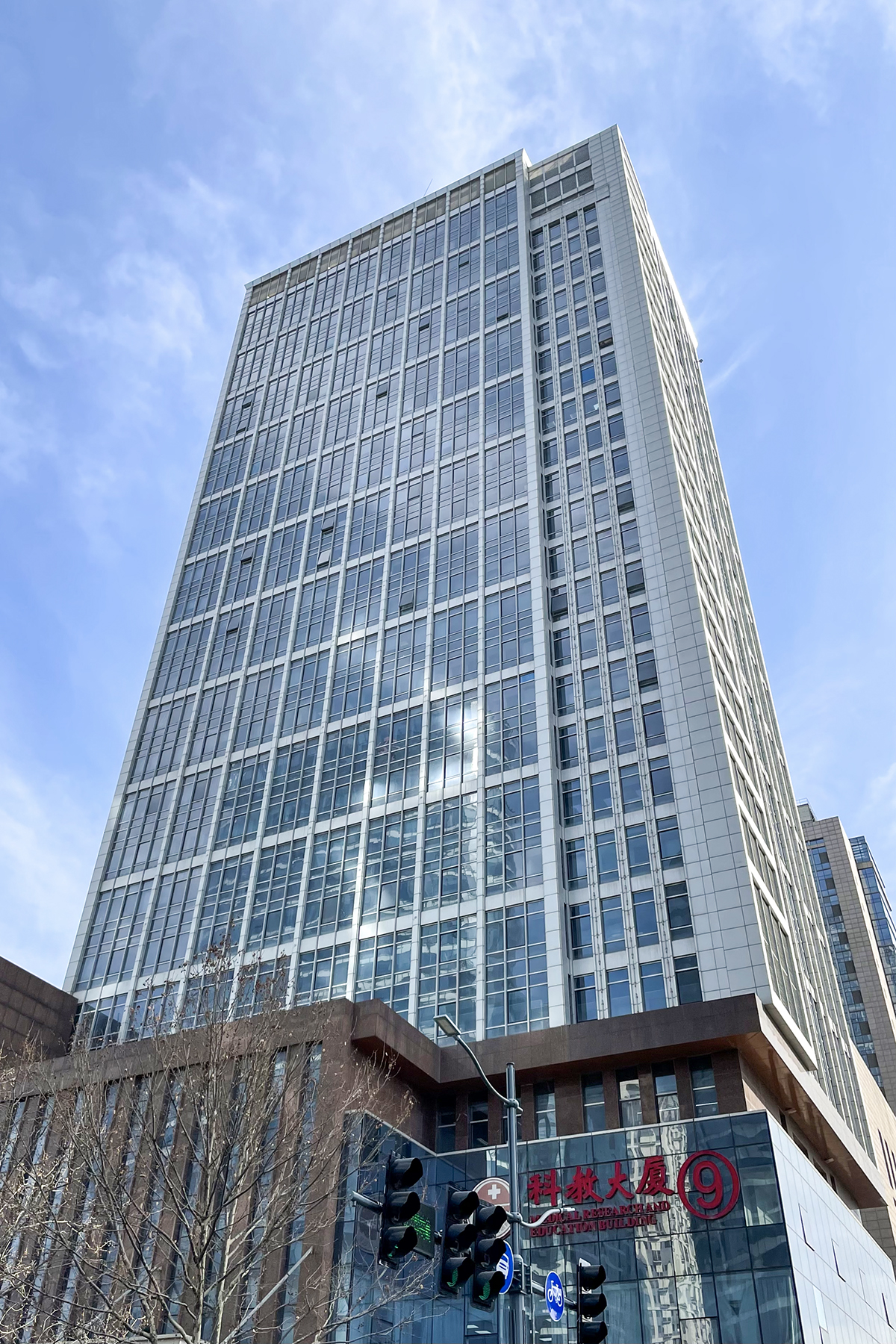
Science and Education Building

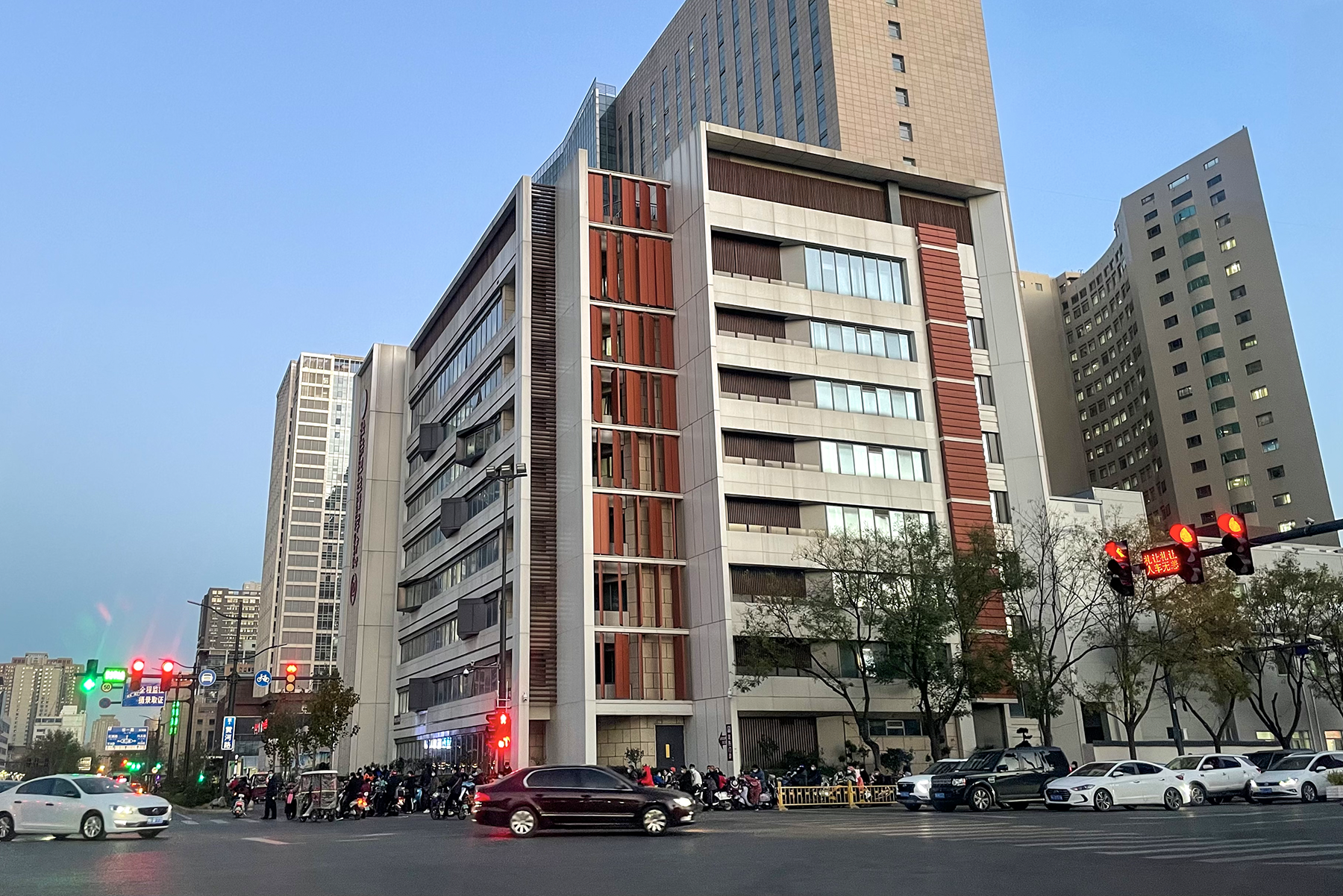
Public Health Medical Center

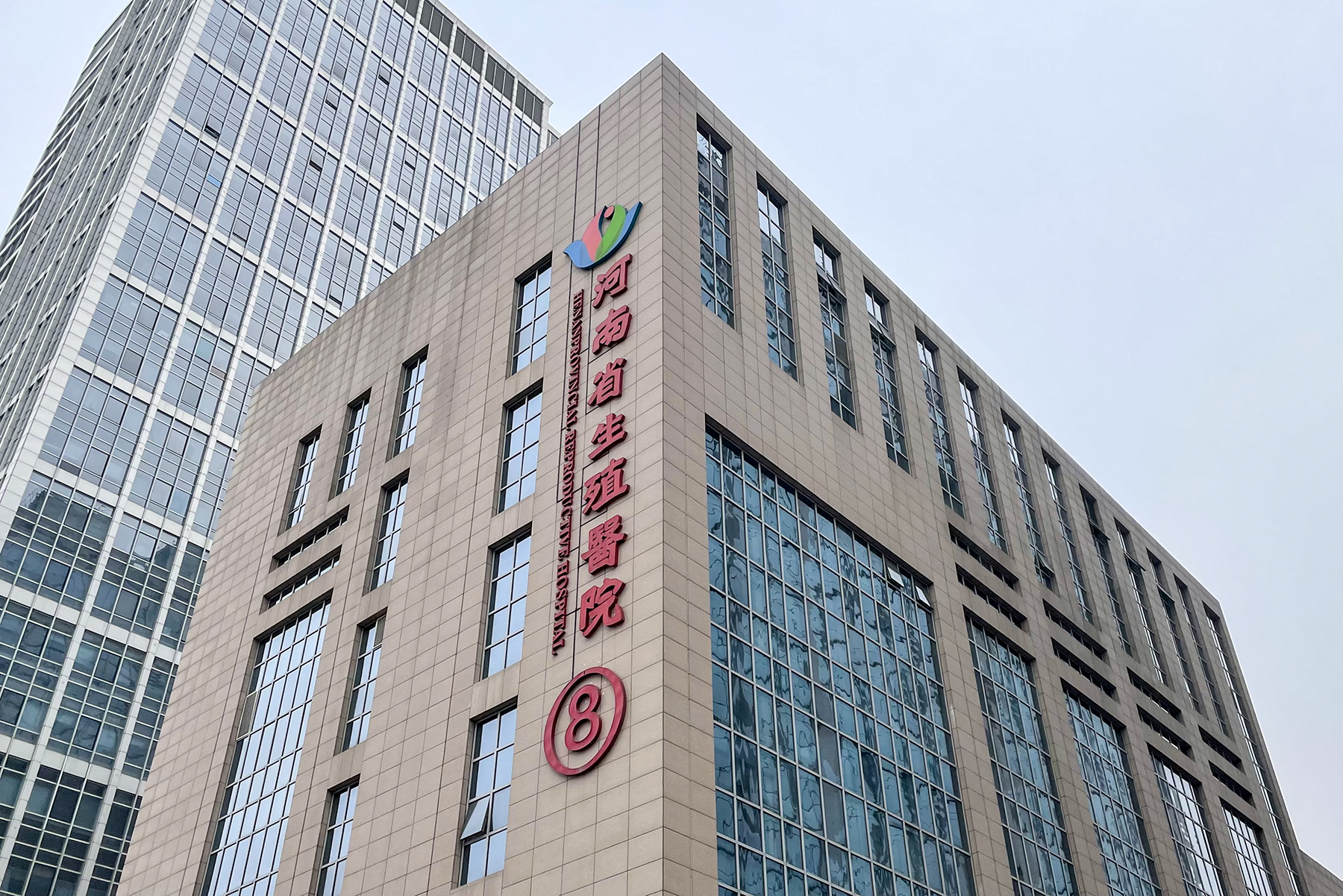
Henan Reproductive Hospital

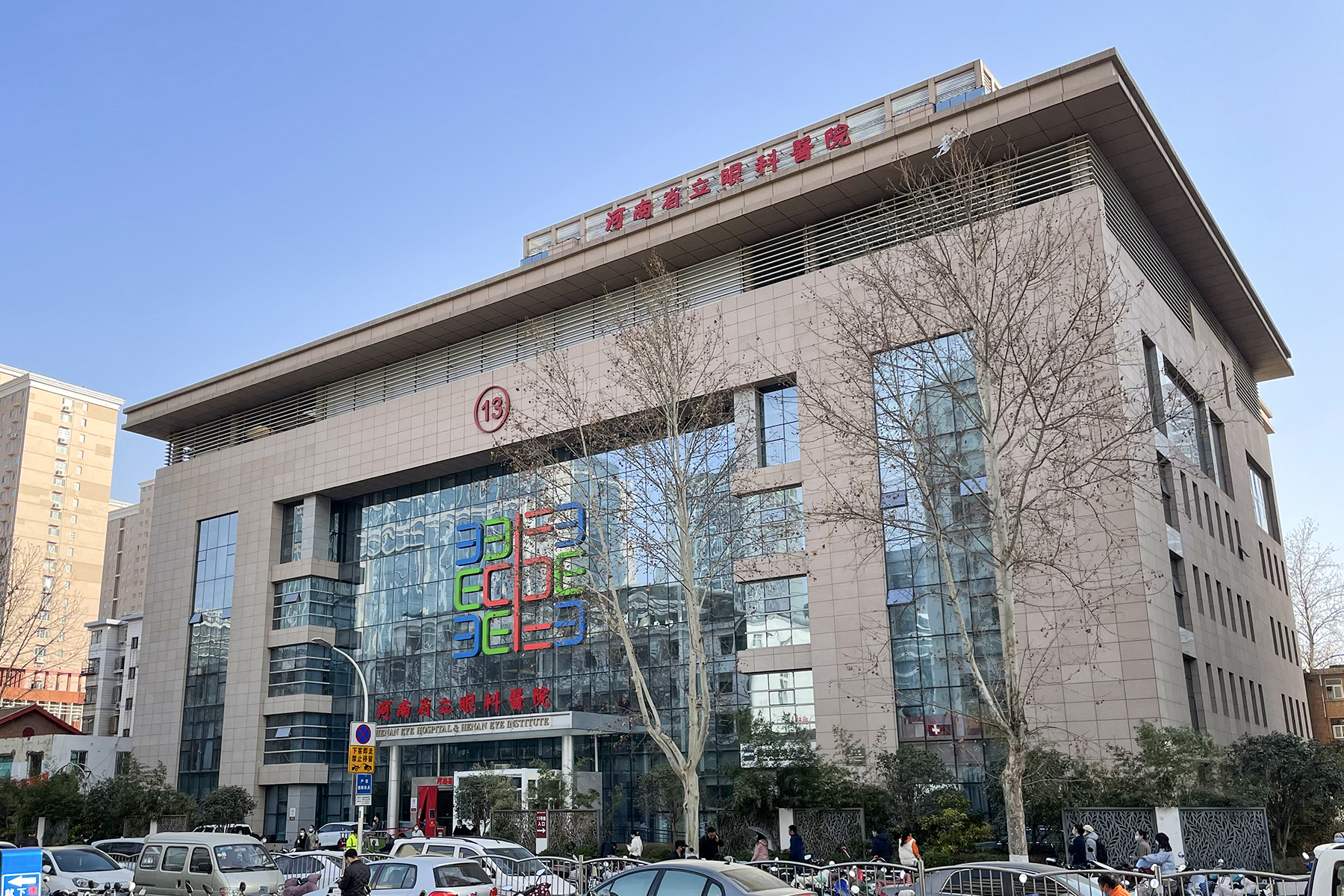
Henan Provincial Eye Hospital

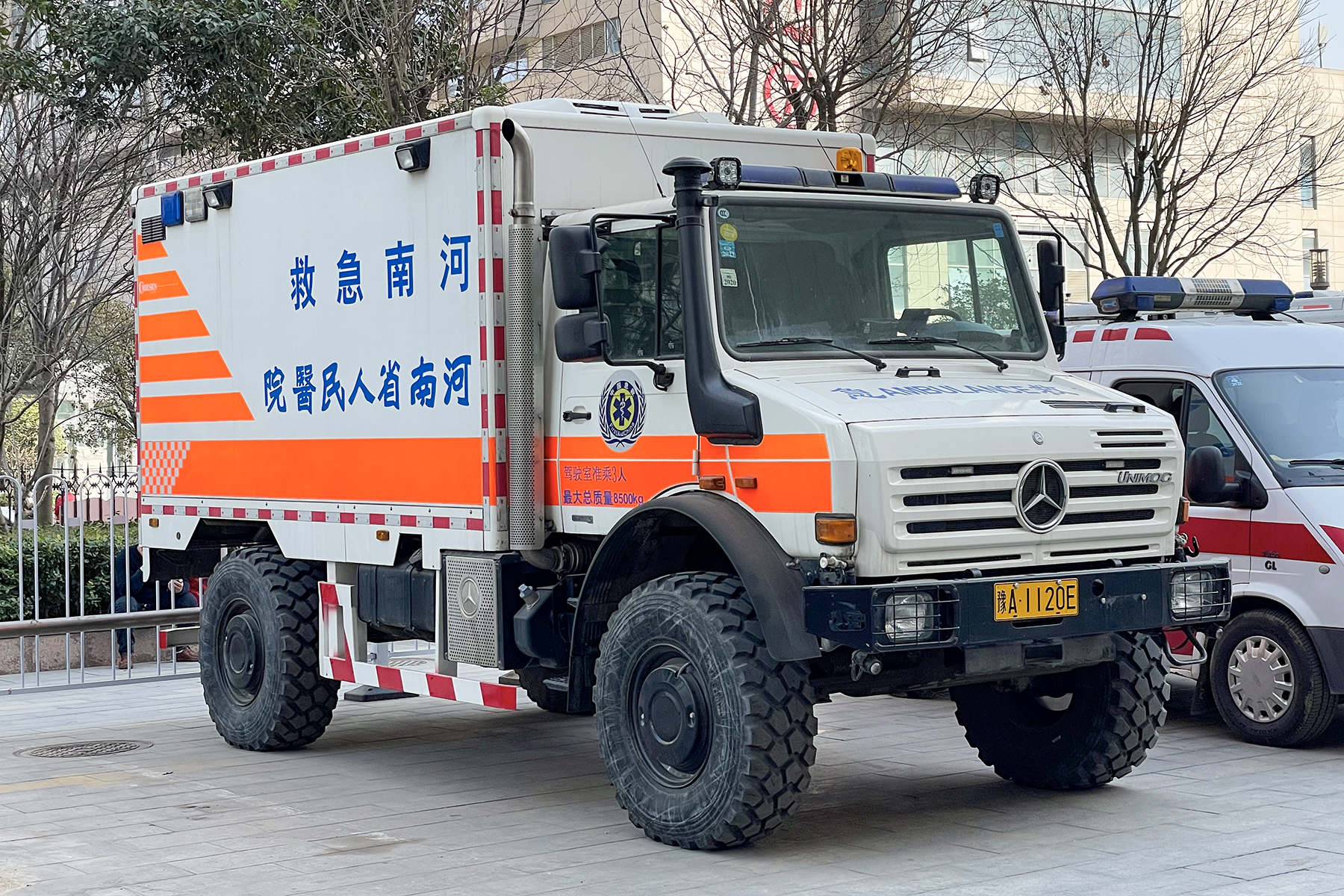
Mercedes-Benz Unimog All-Terrain Ambulance

== See also ==
- Henan Medical College of Zhengzhou University
- Henan People's Hospital station
- Henan University
- Zhengzhou University
- List of hospitals in China
