= Henan Medical College of Zhengzhou University =

Medical school in Zhengzhou, China

- 郑州大学河南医学院
- Type: public
- Established: 1928
- Affiliations: Zhengzhou University
- Dean: Dong Zigang
- Location: Zhengzhou City, Henan Province, People's Republic of China
- Campus: *Zhengzhou University Main Campus: 100 Science Avenue, Medical School Campus: 40 University North Road (former site of Henan Medical University), Airport Campus: new campus of the Medical School, under construction.
- Website: Official website: https://www7.zzu.edu.cn/smzzu/index.htm

Henan Medical College of Zhengzhou University is the medical school of Zhengzhou University located in Zhengzhou, capital of Henan Province in China. Founded in 1928, Henan Medical College has developed into the provincial leader in medical education. The First Affiliated Hospital of the college has been reported to be the largest hospital in the world by number of beds.

== Historical Development ==
In year 1928: The Henan Sun Yat-sen University (now Henan University) established a medical college in Kaifeng. It was the first higher medical college in Henan Province.

1952: Henan Medical College became independent from the university.

1958: Henan Medical College moved from Kaifeng to Zhengzhou.

1984: Henan Medical College was renamed "Henan Medical University".

1991, Henan Medical University built the first postdoctoral research station in Henan Province.

2000: Henan Medical University merged with the former Zhengzhou University and Zhengzhou University of Technology to form the new Zhengzhou University.

2018: Zhengzhou University established a medical college.

In November 2019, the State Key Laboratory for Esophageal Cancer Prevention and Treatment, jointly established by the Ministry of Science and Technology and the Henan Provincial People's Government, was launched. It ranks among the top in the country in esophageal cancer treatment research.

2022: The medical college was renamed "Henan Medical College of Zhengzhou University". After the name change, Zhengzhou University Henan Medical College was to be jointly operated with Zhengzhou University Academy of Medical Science, two names of the same leadership team, and the same set of internal departments.

In July 2024, the new campus of Henan Medical College officially started construction in the Airport Economic Zone, covering a total area of 2391.70 mus and a total building area of 552,664 square meters. The new campus will be able to accommodate 15,000 students.

== Teaching ==
Henan Medical College is recognized by the World Health Organization (WHO). Its education at bachelor, master and doctorial levels is supported by the departments of

- Basic Medical College
- School of Public Health
- School of Nursing and Health
- School of Pharmacy
- School of Stomatology
- Clinical Skills Center

etc.

== Affiliated Hospitals ==
The college is supported by a network of affiliated hospitals, including

- the First Affiliated Hospital of Zhengzhou University
- Second Affiliated Hospital of Zhengzhou University
- Third Affiliated Hospital of Zhengzhou University
- Fifth Affiliated Hospital of Zhengzhou University
- Henan Provincial People's Hospital
- Zhengzhou University Affiliated Children's Hospital
- Zhengzhou University Affiliated Cancer Hospital
- Zhengzhou University Affiliated Zhengzhou Central Hospital
- Zhengzhou University Affiliated Luoyang Central Hospital
- Zhengzhou University Affiliated Chest Hospital
- Zhengzhou University Affiliated Brain Hospital
- Zhengzhou University Affiliated Infectious Disease Hospital

among which, the First Affiliated Hospital of Zhengzhou University has been listed as the largest hospital in the world by number of beds. It is also China’s largest Grade A tertiary hospital for medical treatment, education and scientific research.

== Research ==
Zhengzhou University is a “211 Project” university and also elected as part of the national “Double First-Class Construction” program. The college's research performances in Clinical Medicine, Pharmacology and Toxicology are ranked in the top 0.1% globally by ESI.

== See also ==
- Zhengzhou University
- First Affiliated Hospital of Zhengzhou University
- List of medical schools in China
