= Li Xiaojiang =

Chinese scholar of women's studies (1951–2025)

- Born: 1951
- Died: 12 February 2025 (aged 73)
- Occupations: Professor and Director of the Gender Research Center of Dalian University
- Known for: Feminist
- Notable work: Eve's Exploration (1987); Gender Gap (1898); Academic Discussion on Women/Gender (2005); Criticism in the Post-Utopia Age (2013); and Dialogue with Wang Hui (forthcoming).

Li Xiaojiang (李小江; 1951 – 12 February 2025) was a Chinese scholar of women's studies who was arguably the first to bring Women's Studies to importance in post-Mao China. One of China's leading feminist thinkers and writers, she was a professor at several colleges, as well as director of gender studies at Dalian University. As a young student, she started off at the Henan University studying Western Literature, until an encounter showed her how lacking women's studies scholarship was and caused her to change her major from Western Literature to Women's Studies. In 1983 her work Xiawa de Tansuo (In Search of Eve) was the catalyst for a surge of women's studies. She founded the first Women's Studies Research Centre and later a museum dedicated to women's cultural anthropology.

== Early career ==
Her father was the president of Zhengzhou University. Li Xiaojiang's first concern was with the phrase "women". She wanted to eliminate the regular word which was tied up with cultural baggage, so she recommended nuren, which is a combination of human and female. The new word is void of the cultural baggage of the old word. Li's idea of women's liberation involved personal fulfilment which couldn't be given to anybody from outside, which was a problem of the Chinese Cultural Revolution. The revolution declared it had freed everyone, men and women alike, but Li didn't agree, believing that if women didn't free themselves it showed them as powerless. She also believed that the Cultural Revolution and Social Constructionism ignored the biological differences between men and women.

== Teaching career ==
As a teacher she taught Chinese and Western literature at Zhengzhou University, as well as at the Women's Studies Centre at Henan University in the city of Kaifeng. Both universities are in the Henan Province. At Henan University she founded the Enlightenment series at the Henan People's Press. She also established a Women's Studies program at Zhengzhou University. In May 1985 she organized a class on women and domestic policy and lectured on the topic of women's self-recognition at the Women Cadres School, also in the Henan Province. The women's rights activist Liang Jun also taught there at the same time. The reestablishing of Women's Education Programs soon spread throughout the country. In 1990 Li Xiaojiang organized another women's conference, this time in Zhengzhou.

== Philosophy ==
Li argued from a Marxist perspective that history had three stages of theorizing about women. The first is "Bourgeois Feminist Theory", which was the Paris Commune scene and the middle-class Feminist Rights Movement Against Androcentric Traditional Society. The second is The Proletarian Women's Movement which stretched from the Commune period to the Second World War. The third and final is the revival of the global women's movement. It is the rise of women's theory in socialist and capitalist countries as women ready themselves for the final battle. Li also viewed women's studies and gender studies as two distinct categories. Li's differentiation of Chinese feminism and Western feminism was predicated on the cultural norms. In Chinese culture, it is accepted that gender is a social construct. The Chinese words for man and woman both start with the root for human, ren, and from there the male or female character is added.

Using her experiences of interviewing female revolutionaries and ordinary women during the Chinese Communist Party's early years, Li held a seminar at Columbia University about how Marxists and Maoist ideologies promoted political equality for women. An example is Chairman Mao's "Women hold up half the sky" quote to promote the idea that women should be considered just as good as men. However, in politics and in the employment sector, women did not and do not have as prominent a position as men. And, because of China's political and cultural background, even while Chinese feminists are globally linked, they face different opportunities and challenges from their Western counterparts.

Li Xiaojiang took up an independent feminist viewpoint based on her Marxist background that did not align with the state's position on women's liberation. Like many Chinese feminists, Li usually did not call herself a feminist, both because of the state, and to distance her point of view from Western feminism. She spoke out against Western feminism, which is not always relevant to Chinese women's situations. In her opinion, the problems facing Western women and Chinese women were quite different and the solutions found by Western feminism would not work for Chinese feminism. The important goal of Western feminism was financial freedom for women. Li's feminist theory believes that an important part of Chinese Feminism is home and family. She wanted to be able to remain feminine while still being equal to men. Her vision of feminism largely involves personal fulfilment which cannot be given to you from the outside.

== Career and legacy ==
Li became the general editor of the Women's Studies Research Series. She worked in the Department of Chinese in Zhengzhou University and chaired the Women's Studies Research Center. She also served on the international advisory board for the feminist academic journal Signs.

Li Xiaojiang has been a divisive figure in women's studies. While Li remained attached to Marxist humanist discourse, two other notable scholars, Meng Yue and Dai Jinhua believe that gender difference does not need to be rooted in a person's sex. Li argued frequently with the All-China Women's Federation, a State-sponsored women's organization. Li criticized the Women's Federation for lacking Gender Identity Theory, and the Women's Federation was unwelcoming of Li Xiaojiang. Part of Li Xiaojiang's ability to create controversy while avoiding feedback was due to her location. She resided in a small industrial town with limited resources and of no real importance. The Ford Foundation cooperated with her and through her to fund Women's Studies projects by Chinese feminists. Li had two projects funded by the Ford Foundation. The first was the China Women's Oral History from 2000 to 2003 and the Women/Gender Studies and the Higher Education from 2001 to 2003. China Women's Oral History was the first large project of Gender Studies conducted in China. In 2004 she was the Director of Gender Studies at Dalian University.

== Death ==
Li died on 12 February 2025, at the age of 73.

== Awards and achievements ==
- Henan Women's Study Centre 1985—first women's research NGO since 1949
- First nationwide non-government women's conference, 1985
- Earliest course on women's gender awareness, 1985
- Earliest college discipline on women's issues, 1985
- Earliest discipline framework on China's women, 1986
- First large-scale publication of academic books on women — Women's Studies, 1987–1992
- First women's research centre in a higher education institute — Women Research Center of Zhengzhou University
- First women's academic conference on China's mainland, 1990

== Published works ==
- Gap between Sexes, SDX Joint Publishing Company, 1989
- Study on Women's Aesthetic Awareness, Henan People's Publishing House, 1989
- Women's Journey — Documentary of Women's Development in the New Era, Henan People's Publishing House, 1995
- Interpretation of Women, Jiangsu People's Publishing House, 1999
- Women's Studies, Henan People's Publishing House, 1992, chief editor
- Women's Study and Movement — Case Study of China, Oxford University Press 1997
- Women or Feminism? — Culture Conflicts and Identity Recognition, Jiangsu People's Publishing House, 2000, chief editor

== Research projects ==
- China Women's Oral History, Ford Foundation, 2000–2003
- Women/Gender Studies and the Higher Education, Ford Foundation, 2001–2003
