= First Affiliated Hospital of Zhengzhou University =

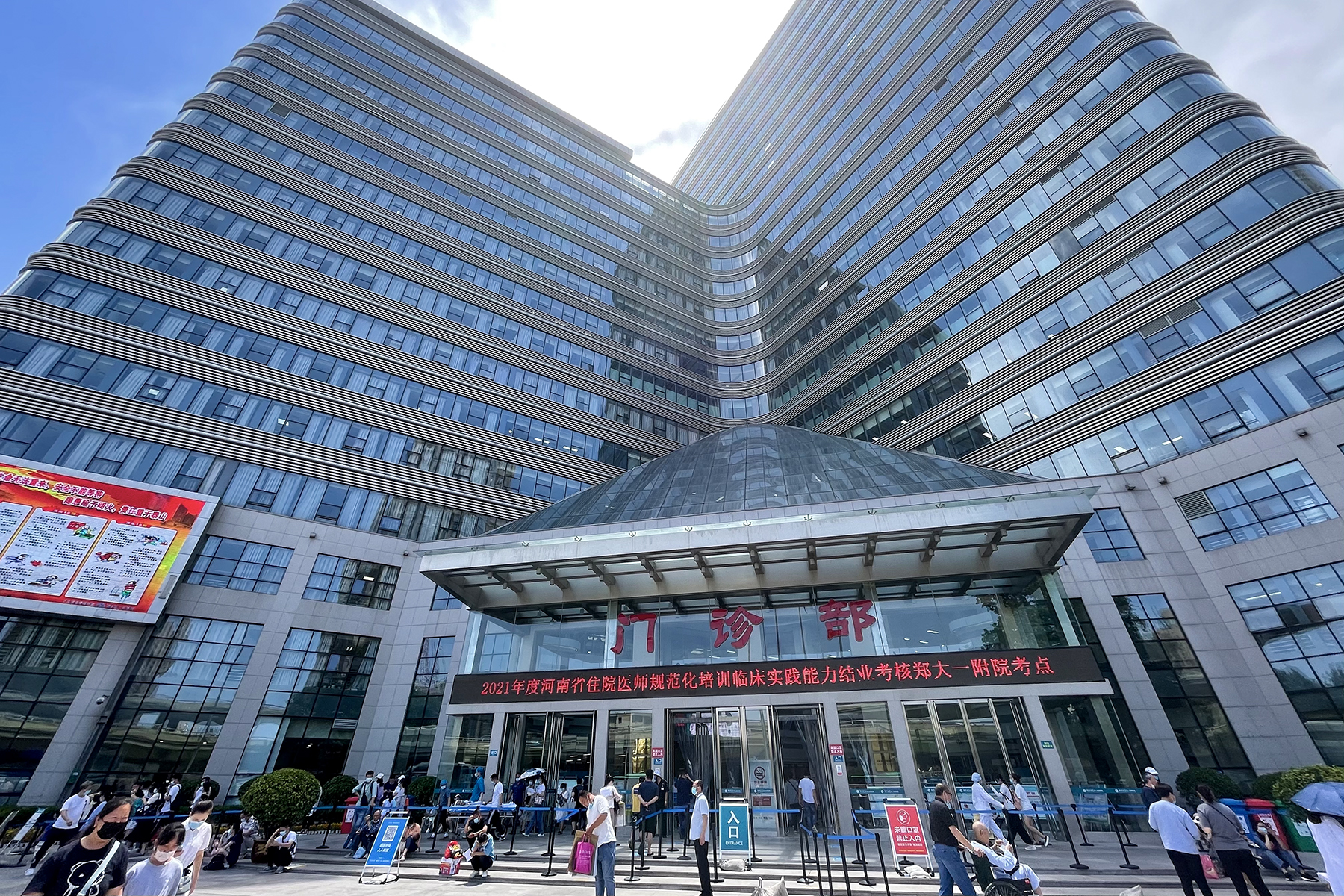

Geography
- Location: 1 Jianshe E Rd, Erqi District, Zhengzhou, Henan, China
- Coordinates: 34°45′11.7″N 113°38′44.1″E

Organisation
- Care system: Public
- Type: Teaching
- Affiliated university: Zhengzhou University

Services
- Emergency department: Yes
- Beds: 7,000 (Heyi Hospital); 3,000 (Zhengdong Hospital)

History
- Founded: 1928

Links
- Website: zdyfy.com
- Lists: Hospitals in China

The First Affiliated Hospital of Zhengzhou University (ZDYFY; Chinese: 郑州大学第一附属医院) is an affiliated hospital of Zhengzhou University, a public university in Zhengzhou, China. With more than 7,000 beds provided and an annual revenue of 7.5 billion Yuan in 2014, the hospital claims itself as "the largest hospital in the world."

== History ==
The hospital was established as the First Affiliated Hospital of National Henan University in September 1928 in Kaifeng, the then capital of Henan province. It was relocated to Zhengzhou in 1958 and was renamed as the First Affiliated Hospital of Henan Medical College. In 2000, with the merger of Zhengzhou University, Zhengzhou Institute of Technology and Henan Medical University, the hospital was renamed to its current name.
