= Liang Jun (activist) =

Chinese teacher and activist

Liang Jun (Chinese: 梁軍; pinyin: Liáng Jūn; born 1945) is a Chinese activist and teacher, who has campaigned for women's right to education in China, as well as being a co-founder of both the Henan Community Education Research Centre and China's first women's history museum, the Henan Women and Children Activity Center.

== Biography ==
Liang was born in Yiyang county in Henan in 1945. She graduated from Beijing Normal University's History Department in 1968. From 1985 she subsequently taught at Henan Women Cadres School, where she was eventually promoted to the role of Vice President. During her time as a teacher she travelled to rural communities talking to women, and giving lectures to professional bodies such as the Women Technical Workers' Association, the Women Cadres' Association, the Women's Teachers' Association, and the Women Medical Workers' Association.

An advocate for women's rights in China since the 1980s, and in particular the right to education, in 1998 Liang co-founded the Henan Community Education Research Centre. The centre worked to support women in rural areas to establish cooperatives, as well as campaigning against domestic violence, and other issues. She has also worked with people who are HIV positive, and established the Red Ribbon Association. She was later appointed Vice President of Zhengzhou University International Friendship Women's College.

Liang has also worked as an oral historian, collecting testimonies for China's first women's history museum, the Henan Women and Children Activity Center, which she co-founded with Li Xiaojiang and others.

== Selected publications ==
- Li Xiaojiang, and Liang Jun. "The Contradictory Aspects of Women Cadres' State of Mind and Social Adjustments: Also on Certain Issues Involving Construction of the Ranks of Women Cadres." Chinese Sociology & Anthropology 20.3 (1988): 52–68.
- Liang Jun. "The Prevention and Cure of AIDS in Rural Areas: Experiences in Community Intervention." Chinese Sociology & Anthropology 40.4 (2008): 90-96.
