= Peng Li (professor) =

Peng Li from the Texas A&M University, College Station, TX, USA was named a fellow of the Institute of Electrical and Electronics Engineers in 2016 for contributions to the analysis and modeling of integrated circuits and systems.
