= Li Peng (physiologist) =

Chinese physiologist

- 李蓬

President of Zhengzhou University
- Incumbent
- Assumed office 5 June 2022
- Preceded by: Liu Jiongtian

Personal details
- Born: October 1965 (age 60–61) Ningdu County, Jiangxi, China
- Party: Chinese Communist Party
- Spouse: Lin Shengcai
- Education: Beijing Normal University; University of California, San Diego
- Scientific career
- Fields: Molecular physiology
- Workplaces: Singapore Institute of Molecular and Cell Biology (1997–2003); Hong Kong University of Science and Technology (2003–2006); Tsinghua University (2006–2022); Zhengzhou University (2022–present)

Li Peng (Chinese: 李蓬; pinyin: Lǐ Péng; born October 1965) is a Chinese physiologist who is a professor at Tsinghua University, and currently president of Zhengzhou University. She is an academician of the Chinese Academy of Sciences. She is a member of the Chinese Communist Party.

== Biography ==
Li was born in Ningdu County, Jiangxi, in October 1965. She secondary studied at Ningdu High School. In 1983, she entered Beijing Normal University, majoring in the Department of Biology. In 1988, she arrived in the United States to begin her education at the University of California, San Diego. She carried out postdoctoral research at the National University of Singapore in 1995 and University of Texas, Dallas in 1996.

Li was hired as an associate professor and research director of the Singapore Institute of Molecular and Cell Biology in 1997, where she remained until 2003, when she was recruited by the Hong Kong University of Science and Technology. She moved to the School of Life Sciences, Tsinghua University in 2006, and was elevated to vice dean in 2009. In June 2022, she was appointed president of Zhengzhou University, becoming the first female president of the university.

== Personal life ==
Li was married to Lin Shengcai, who is a biologist and an academician of the Chinese Academy of Sciences.

== Honours and awards ==
- 2012 Science and Technology Progress Award of the Ho Leung Ho Lee Foundation
- 7 December 2015 Member of the Chinese Academy of Sciences (CAS)
- 15 November 2016 Fellow of The World Academy of Sciences (TWAS)

Educational offices
Preceded by Liu Jiongtian	President of Zhengzhou University; 2022–present	Incumbent
