= Zhengzhou University =

Provincial public university in Zhengzhou, Henan, China

Coordinates: 34°46′N 113°39′E

- 郑州大学
- Type: Public
- Established: 1928; 98 years ago
- Affiliations: Double First-Class Construction; 211 Project; National Alliance of High-level Local Universities (NAHLU)
- President: Li Peng
- Administrative staff: 5,926
- Students: 72,600
- Location: Zhengzhou, Henan, China
- Campus: Urban
- Website: english.zzu.edu.cn

Chinese name
- Simplified Chinese: 郑州大学
- Traditional Chinese: 鄭州大學
Transcriptions
Standard Mandarin
- Hanyu Pinyin: Zhèngzhōu Dàxué

Zhengzhou University (ZZU; 郑州大学) is a provincial public university in Zhengzhou, Henan, China. It is affiliated with the Province of Henan. The university is part of Project 211 and the Double First-Class Construction.

Zhengzhou University is the largest university in China in terms of number of students (around 73,000 students). The campus size is 433 hectares (1,070 acres).

== History ==
Zhengzhou University is the first comprehensive university established by the State Council of Chinese Government in 1954. According to the State Council, a group of faculty members from Shandong University, Peking University, Jilin University and Northeast University moved to Zhengzhou. The Zhengzhou University was established by these professors in 1954.

Henan Medical University dates back to the medical education in National Fifth Sun Yat-Sen University built in 1928 (the predecessor of National Henan University founded in 1942). This national university moved into Zhengzhou in 1952 and established Henan Medical College (the first batch authorized to confer doctoral degrees) which was the fore running of the higher medical education in Henan province.

Zhengzhou University of Technology as a National Key University under the direct administration of the Ministry of Chemical Industry of China, it was founded in 1963.

The university was admitted into Project 211 in 1996. Zhengzhou University was restructured by the merger of three universities i.e., Zhengzhou University, Henan Medical University, and Zhengzhou University of Technology on July 10, 2000. The purpose of this re-establishment was to create a center of top-notch learning covering a huge range of academic disciplines, equipped with excellent research facilities so as to revolutionize higher education in Central China in general and Henan Province in particular. Since its re-establishment, Zhengzhou University has received more attention by the Chinese Ministry of Education and the People's Government of Henan Province in terms of governmental support, finances, inter institutional cooperation and research collaboration.

== Campus ==
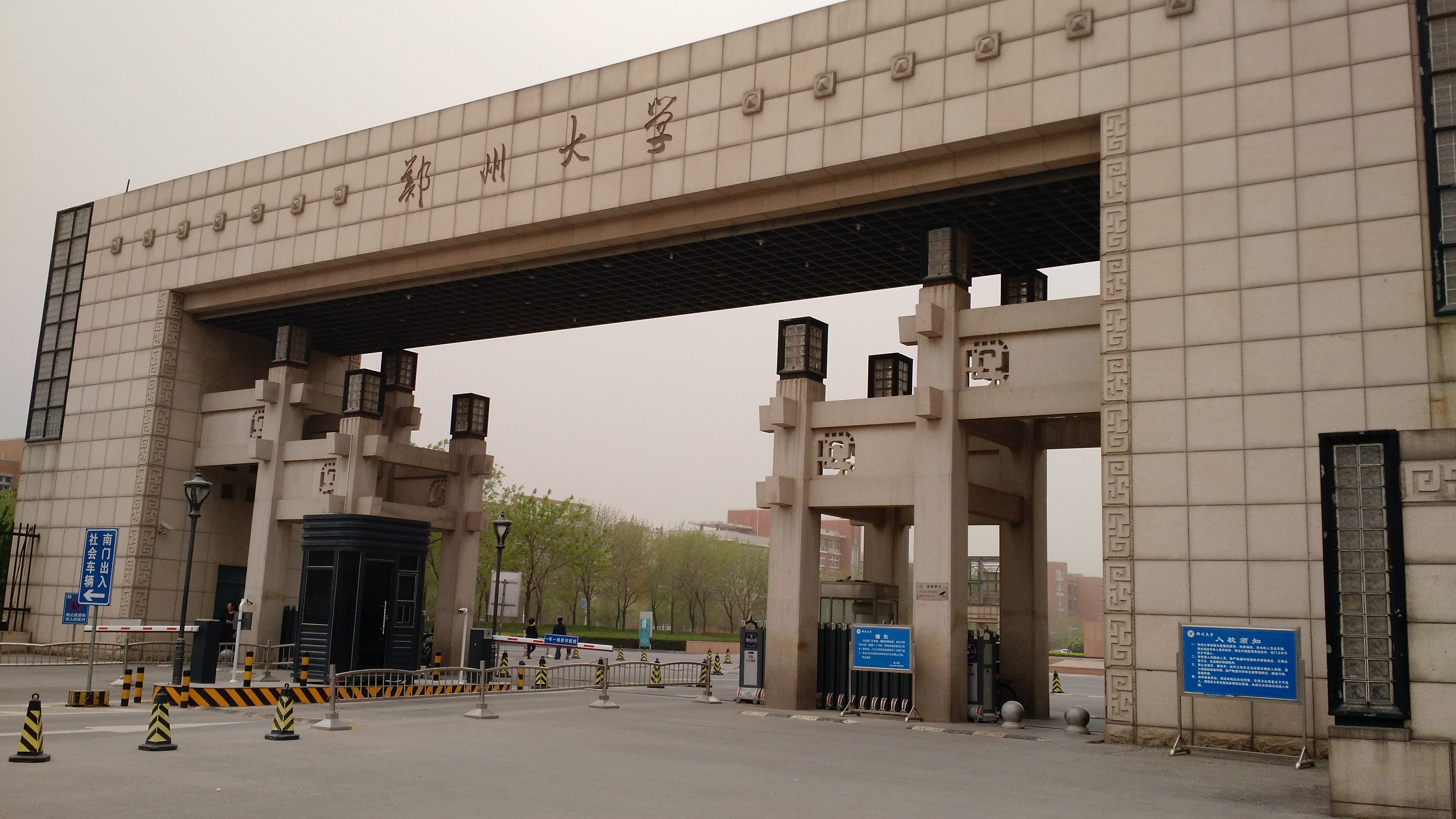
Main Gate of Zhengzhou University

Zhengzhou University now has four campuses covering 1070 acres land across Zhengzhou City. The main campus covers 799 acres of land on Science Avenue and Changchun Road in North-West section of Zhengzhou City. It is one of the most beautiful campuses in China with a construction cost of more than two billion Yuan. Majority of schools and faculties are located at main campus.

The east campus is the campus of previous Henan Medical University in the city center between Zhongyuan Road and Jianshe Road. The clinical stage of medical education is held on this campus. The First Affiliated Hospital of Zhengzhou University, with more than 10,000 sickbeds, is the largest hospital in the world.

The south campus is the campus of previous Zhengzhou University in the city center area of Daxue Road.

The north campus is the campus of previous Zhengzhou University of Technology in the city center of Wenhua Road 97. Some of the buildings were constructed with the help of USSR. One of the most famous School: the School of Cyberspace Security is located in here. The school of Cyberspace Security has three programs for Bachelor, which are among the best in Zhengzhou University.

== Staff, Programs, Students ==
After years of balanced development, Zhengzhou University now is a multi-discipline institution with 12 fields, such as science, engineering, medicine, literature, history, philosophy, law, economics, management science, pedagogy, agriculture and arts. Currently there are six national key disciplines, condensed matter physics, materials processing engineering, history of ancient China, organic chemistry, chemical technology, pathology and pathophysiology; 21 first-level disciplines are authorized to confer doctoral degrees, 3 independent second-level disciplines to confer doctoral degrees, 55 first-level disciplines to confer master's degrees, as well as 24 post-doctoral research stations. There are 51 Schools and departments as well as 9 affiliated hospitals in Zhengzhou University. The number of staff is over 6,000, 4000 academic members, 37 academicians of the Chinese Academy of Science and Engineering (15 full-time, 22 part-time and 4 oversea), 747 professors, and 1,600 associate professors. In 2020, there are around 51,000 undergraduate students, 19,000 graduate students and 2,600 international students studying in Zhengzhou University.

== Schools ==
There exist 51 schools or departments in Zhengzhou University, ranging from art and literature to social and natural science and engineering.

=== Medicine Schools and Departments ===
School	Program (Bachelor)
School of Clinical Medicine	Clinical Medicine (5/7-year) Anesthesiology Medical Imageology MBBS (Six-year)
School of Basic Medicine	Basic Medicine
School of Nursing	Nursing
School of Public Health	Preventive Medicine
School of Pharmaceutical Sciences	Pharmaceutical Preparation Pharmacy
School of Stomatology	Stomatology
Department of Clinical Medical Laboratory Science	Medical Laboratory Science

=== Humanities and Social Science Schools and Departments ===
School	Program (Bachelor)
School of Business	Statistics Business Administration Accounting International Trade Financial Science Economics
Department of Education	Applied Psychology Pedagogy
School of Fine Arts	Calligraphy Sculpture Painting Artistic Design
School of Foreign Languages	German Russian Japanese English
School of History	Archaeology History
School of Information Management	Information Management and Information System Archival Science Library Science
School of Journalism & Communication	Science of Radio and Television Journalism Science of Advertisement Journalism
School of Law	Law
School of Liberal Arts	Teaching Chinese Language Internationally Chinese Language and Literature
School of Management	Electronic Commerce Engineering Management Industrial Engineering Logistics Management
School of Education	Education in Ideology and Politics
School of Music	Music and Performance Musicology
School of Public Administration	Social Work Administration Public Affairs Management Philosophy
School of Physical Education	Physical Education
School of Tourism Management	Marketing Music Performance (flight direction) Hotel Management Tourism Management

=== Science and Engineering Schools ===
School	Program (Bachelor)
School of Cyberspace Security	Information Security Cryptographic Science and Technology Internet of Things Engineering
School of Mathematics & Statistics	Mathematics and Applied Mathematics Information and Computer Sciences Statistics Financial Mathematics
School of Physical Engineering	Electronic Science and Technology Electronic Information Science and Technology Observation & Control Techniques and Instrument Physics Applied Physics
School of Electrical Engineering	Electric Engineering and Automation Automation Biomedical Engineering
School of Chemistry & Molecular Engineering	Chemistry Applied Chemistry
School of Chemical Engineering & Energy	Safety Engineering (System Security Oriented) Medicine-making Engineering Process Equipment and Control Engineering Thermal Energy and Power Engineering Chemical Engineering and Technology Environmental Science
School of Life Science	Biotechnology Biological Engineering Biological information
School of Mechanical Engineering	Industrial Design Mechanical Engineering and Automation Automation and Mechanical Design & Manufacturing
School of Mechanics Science & Engineering	Safety Engineering(Equipment and Safety ) Engineering Mechanics
School of Information Engineering	Software Engineering Electronic Information Engineering Computer Science and Technology Communicational Engineering
School of Civil Engineering	Transportation Engineering Urban Underground Space Engineering Construction Environment & Equipment Engineering Civil Engineering
School of Architecture	Landscape Architecture Urban Planning Architecture Artistic Design (EnvironmentalArtistic Design Oriented)
School of Material Science & Engineering	Packing Engineering Material Shaping and Control Engineering Material Science and Engineering Polymer Materials and Engineering
School of Water Conservancy & Environment	Hydrology and Water Resources Hydraulic and Hydropower Engineering Hydraulic Structure Engineering Water Conservancy Engineering Water Supply and Drainage Engineering Environmental Engineering Structural Engineering Municipal Engineering Geotechnical Engineering Disaster Prevention and Reduction Engineering Harbor, Coastal, and Offshore Engineering Road, Bridge and River Crossing Engineering

== Institutes ==
National Supercomputing Center in Zhengzhou

As the seventh National Supercomputing Center approved by the Ministry of Science and Technology, Zhengzhou Center is a major technology innovation platform deployed by the state in Henan during the 13th “Five-Year Plan” period. The theoretical peak computing capacity of the host system in the center is 100PFlops and the storage capacity is 100PB. The measured continuous computing performance of the host system ranks first in the world.

Zhengzhou University Luoyang Campus

Zhengzhou University Luoyang Campus is a satellite campus of Zhengzhou University located in Luoyang, Henan.

== Rankings ==
University rankings
BCUR National	Domestic	50
Wu Shulian National	Domestic	32
CUAA National	Alumni	71
QS National	General	35
THE National	General	38–51
QS Asia (Asia version)	General	180
THE Asia (Asia version)	General	=170
ARWU World	Research	151–200
QS World	General	=618
THE World	General	601–800
USNWR World	General	=203

There are 17 ESI disciplines in the top 1% of the world, including clinical medicine, chemistry, materials science, engineering, pharmacology and toxicology, biology and biochemistry, molecular biology and genetics, neuroscience and behavioral science, immunology, environment and ecology, physics, social science overview, computer science, agricultural science, microbiology, plant and zoology, mathematics, etc.

Zhengzhou University has been ranked among the top 150-200 global universities by Academic Ranking of World Universities since 2023, and 203rd globally and 45th in Asia as of 2025 by the US News & World Report Best Global University Ranking.

Times Higher Education 2023 has ranked ZZU in 601-800 best global universities, while the QS World University Rankings 2025 ranked it 511 globally. The CWTS Ranking 2023 of Leiden University ranked ZZU as 50th best global university whereas NTU World Universities Ranking 2021 ranked it 134. The QS Asia Top Universities 2022 ranked it among 220 best universities of Asia.

== Research ==
Featuring a considerable scientific research foundation, Zhengzhou University now owns more than 330 scientific research institutions of various disciplines. These include a National Engineering Research Center; a National Technology Research Promotion Center; a National Chemical Safety Engineering Technology Center; a National Research Center for Safety Evaluation of Drugs; two National Drug Clinical Research Bases; three MOE Key Labs; two MOE Engineering Research Centers; a Key Research Base of College Humanities and Social Sciences sponsored by the MOE and the Province; a Sports Culture Research Base under the Sports Culture Development Research Center of the State Sports General Administration; a National Intellectual Property Training Base; six Henan Provincial Collaborative Innovation Centers; Provincial Key Labs; Engineering Technology Research Centers; International United Labs; Key Humanities and Social Science Research Bases; Provincial Universities and Colleges Key Principles Open Labs; Engineering Technology Research Centers; State Key Laboratory Cultivation Bases (totalling up to 104); and Provincial Key Scientific and Research institutions (Totalling up to 125). With a total construction area of 84,000sqm, its library contains a collection of books of more than 7.971 million. The university has its own publishing house and issues 14 academic journals.

== Scholarship programs ==
As the largest university in China, Zhengzhou University provides millions of US dollars to sponsor hundreds of applicants with full scholarship and partial scholarship to pursue their degree non-degree study in Zhengzhou University each year. This is the only Chinese university with so many scholarship seats. In 2018, about 500 newly recruited students were sponsored by various types of scholarship, such as President Scholarship, Henan Government Scholarship, Chinese Government Scholarship, Confucius Scholarship. These scholarships usually covers:

1. Majority part of tuition for bachelor program.
2. Whole tuition for master program.
3. Tuition, accommodation and living allowance for doctor program.

== School of International Education ==
The School of International Education (SIE) is in charge of international education of Zhengzhou University. There are approximately 1,700 overseas students from 70 countries/areas, among them 80% are degree students, more than 10% are supported by full scholarship. SIE also houses a Chinese language education base (accredited by the Overseas Chinese Affairs Office of State Council) and a Chinese international promotion base of Henan Province offering a number of Chinese language programs from short term training to bachelor's and master's degree. SIE runs a Confucius School jointly with Indian Vellore Institute of Technology and a Confucius class with St Mary School in USA. Zhengzhou university in collaboration with MEDVIZZ - CEO, Dr G Bhanu Prakash to train all medical fraternities for USMLE, PLAB AND FMGE in the campus itself.

Zhengzhou University is dedicated to conducting various forms cooperation and exchanges with famous universities abroad, absorbing advanced education programs and striving to achieve the objective of internationalization.

== Notable alumni ==
- Zhang Hongjiang, a Chinese computer scientist, international member of National Academy of Engineering, and executive. He served as CEO of Kingsoft, managing director of Microsoft Advanced Technology Center (ATC) and chief technology officer (CTO) of Microsoft China Research and Development Group (CRD).
- Chen Quanguo, the current Communist Party Secretary of Xinjiang and the former Party Committee Secretary of Tibet Autonomous Region

== Notable faculty ==
- Liang Jun, teacher and women's rights activist

== Image archive ==
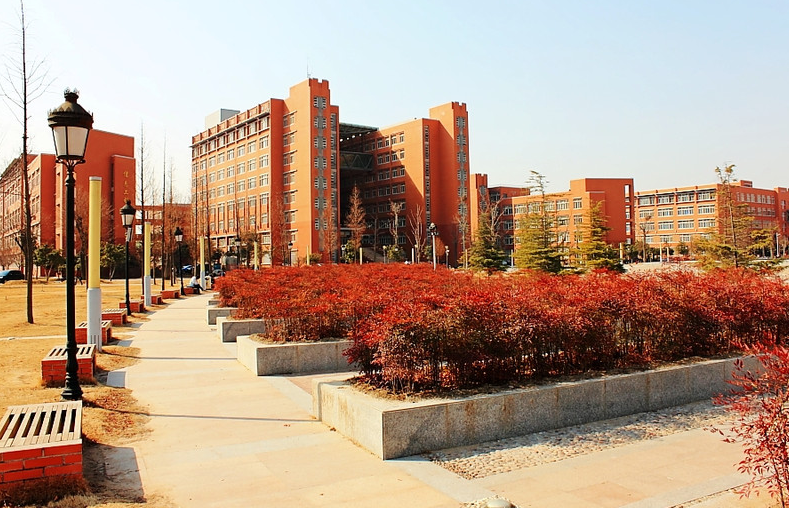
Core Teaching Area Central

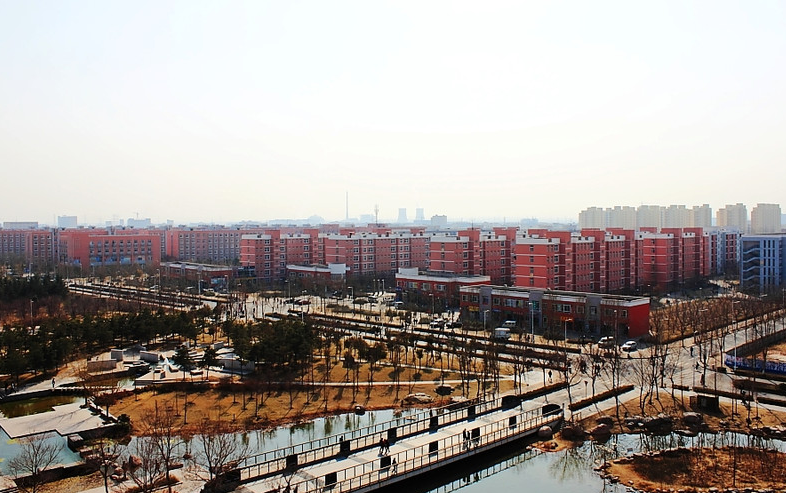
Overlook of Zhengzhou University Campus

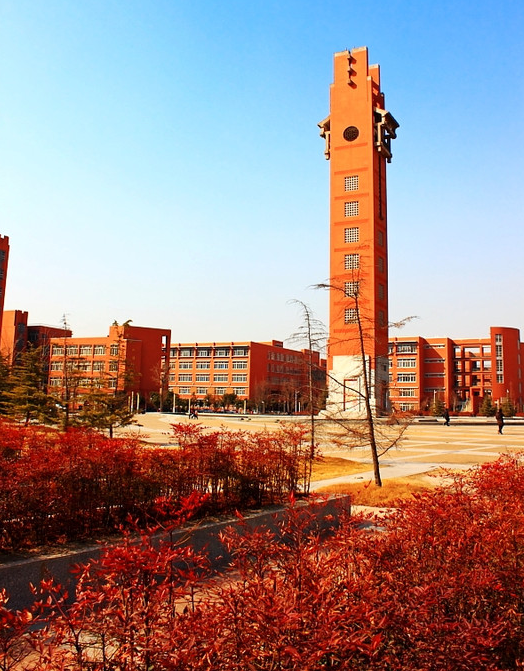
Bell tower square

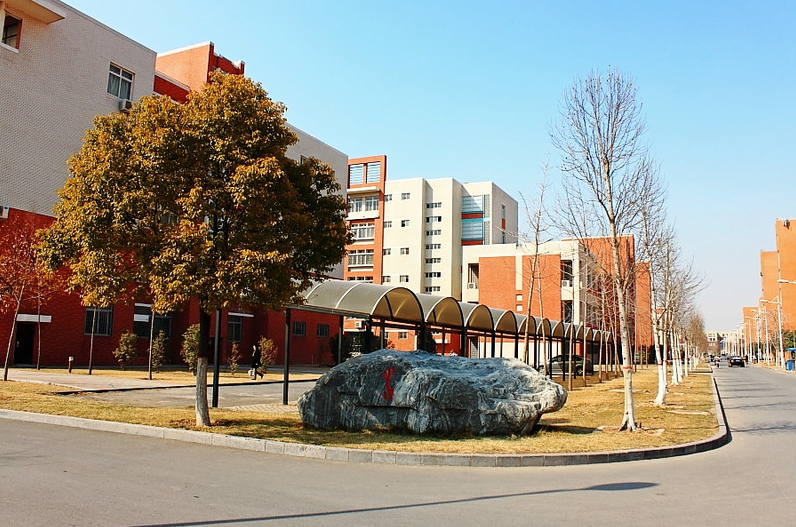
Zhengzhou University Campus

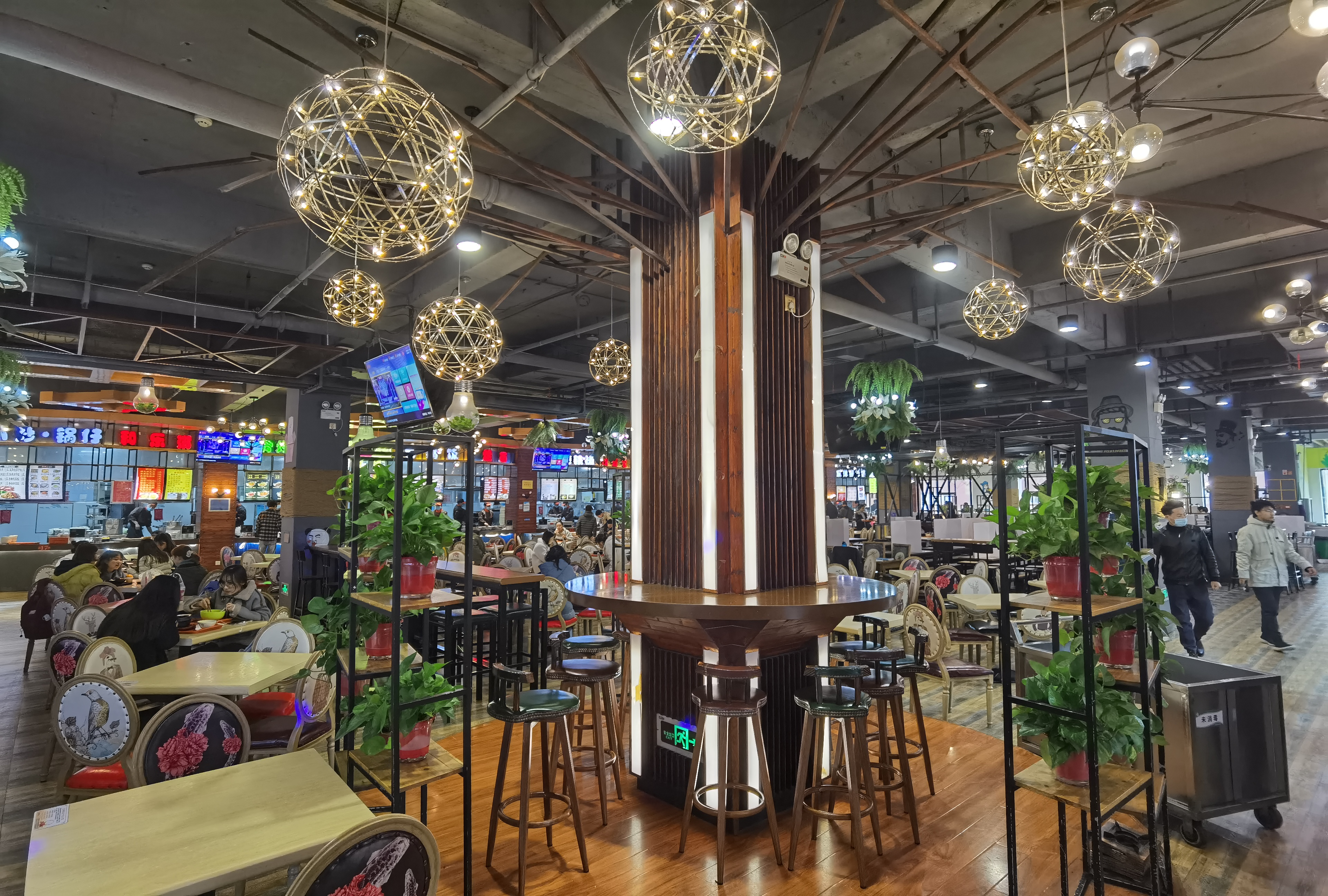
Zhengzhou University Restaurant

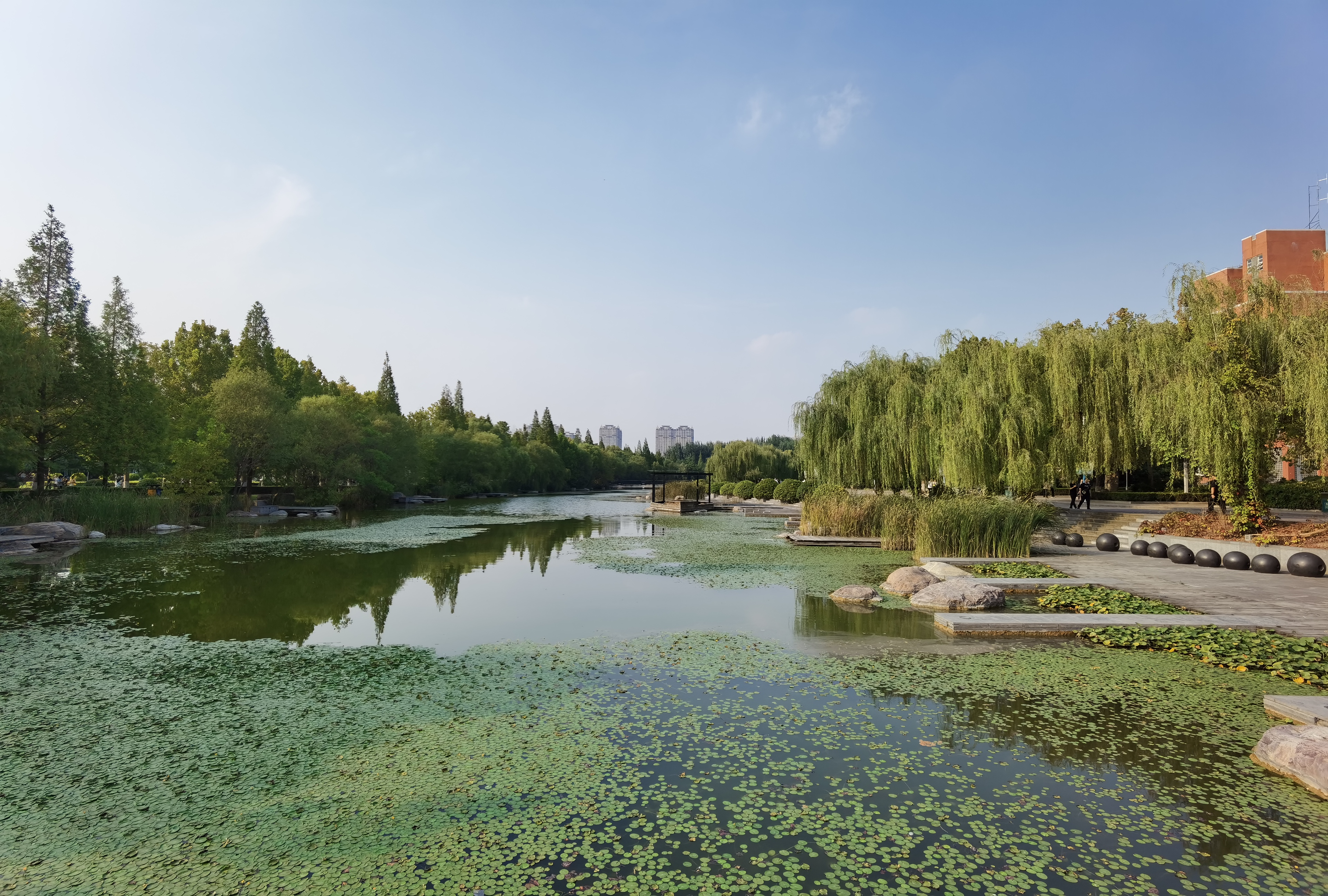
Meihu Artificial Lake, Zhengzhou University

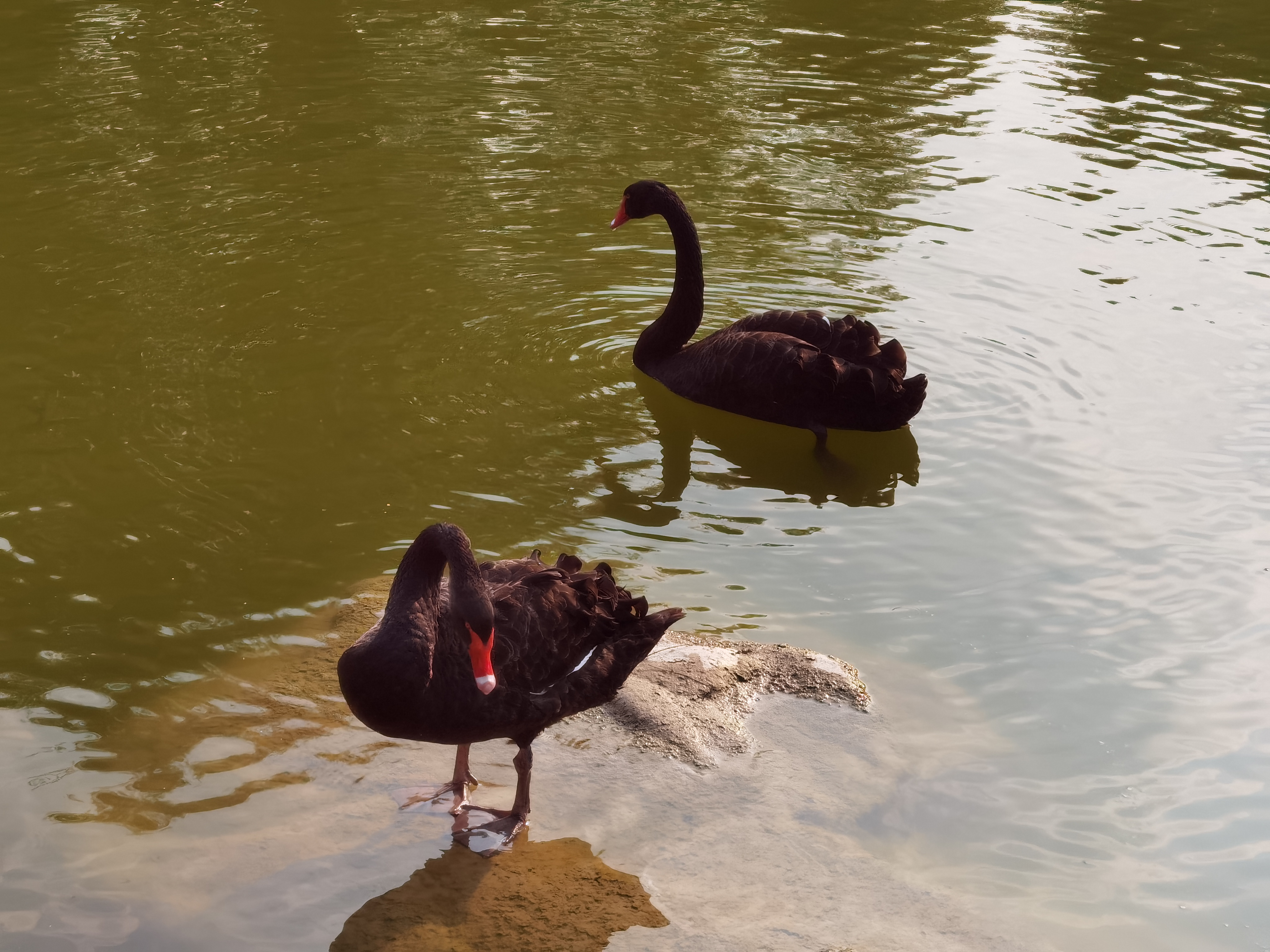
Meihu swan of Zhengzhou University

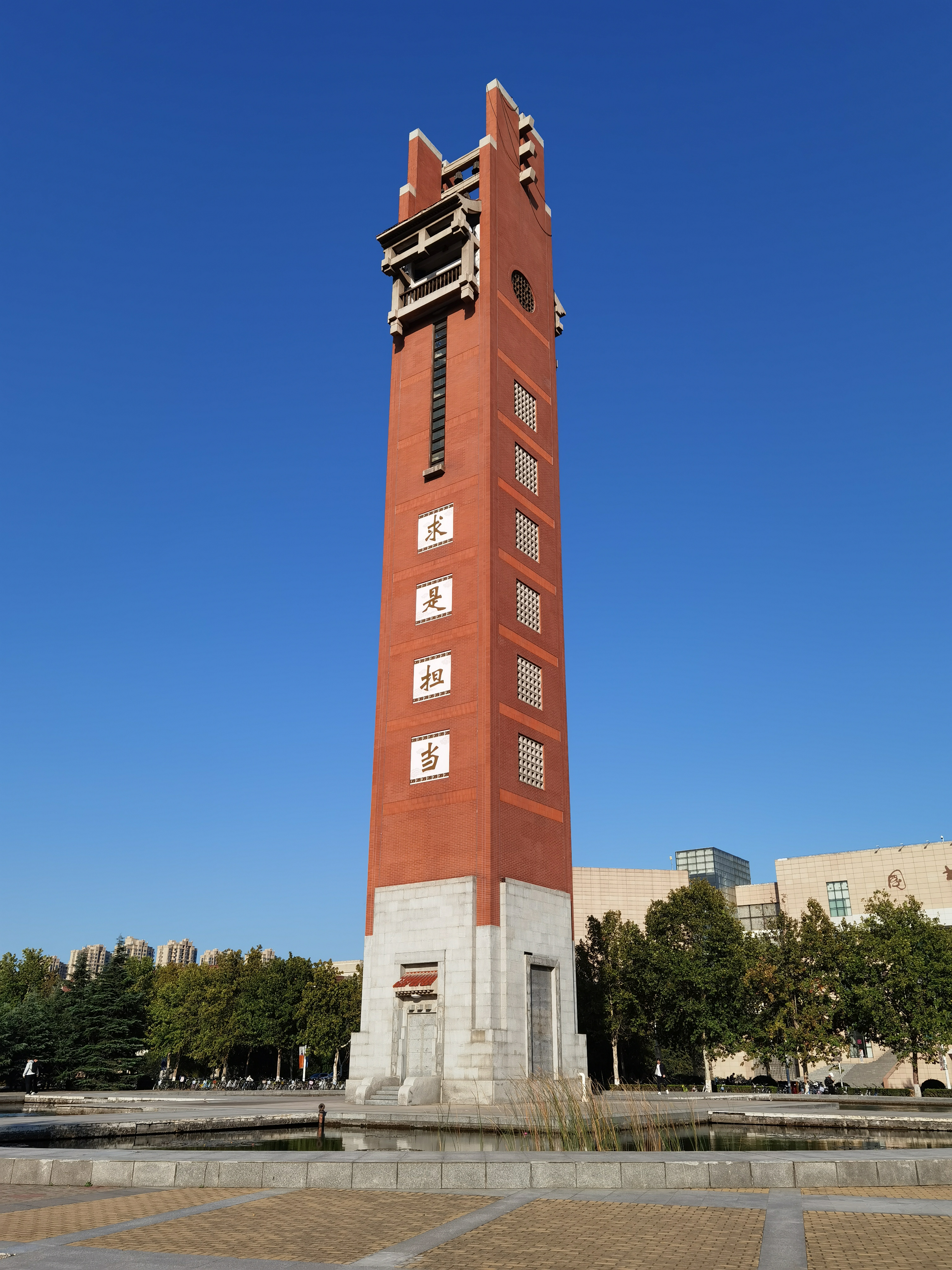
Clock tower of Zhengzhou University

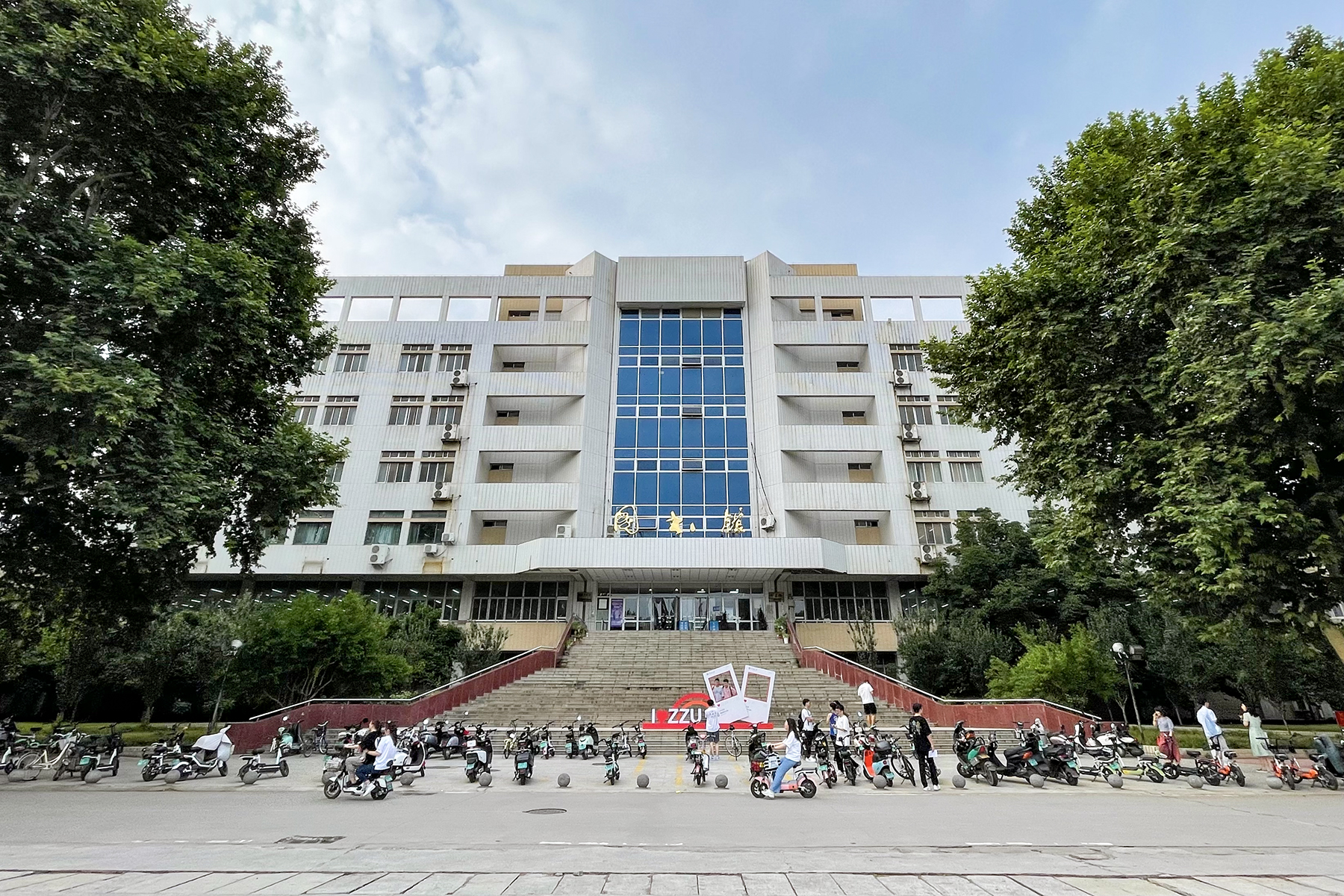
Library of ZZU South Campus

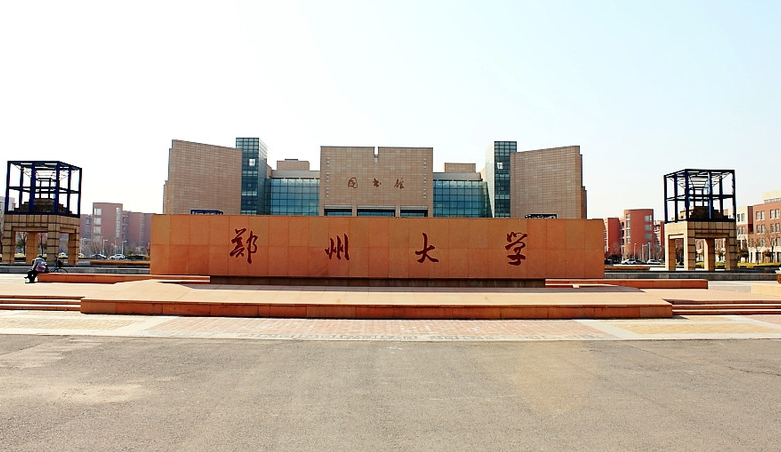
Zhengzhou University Main Gate

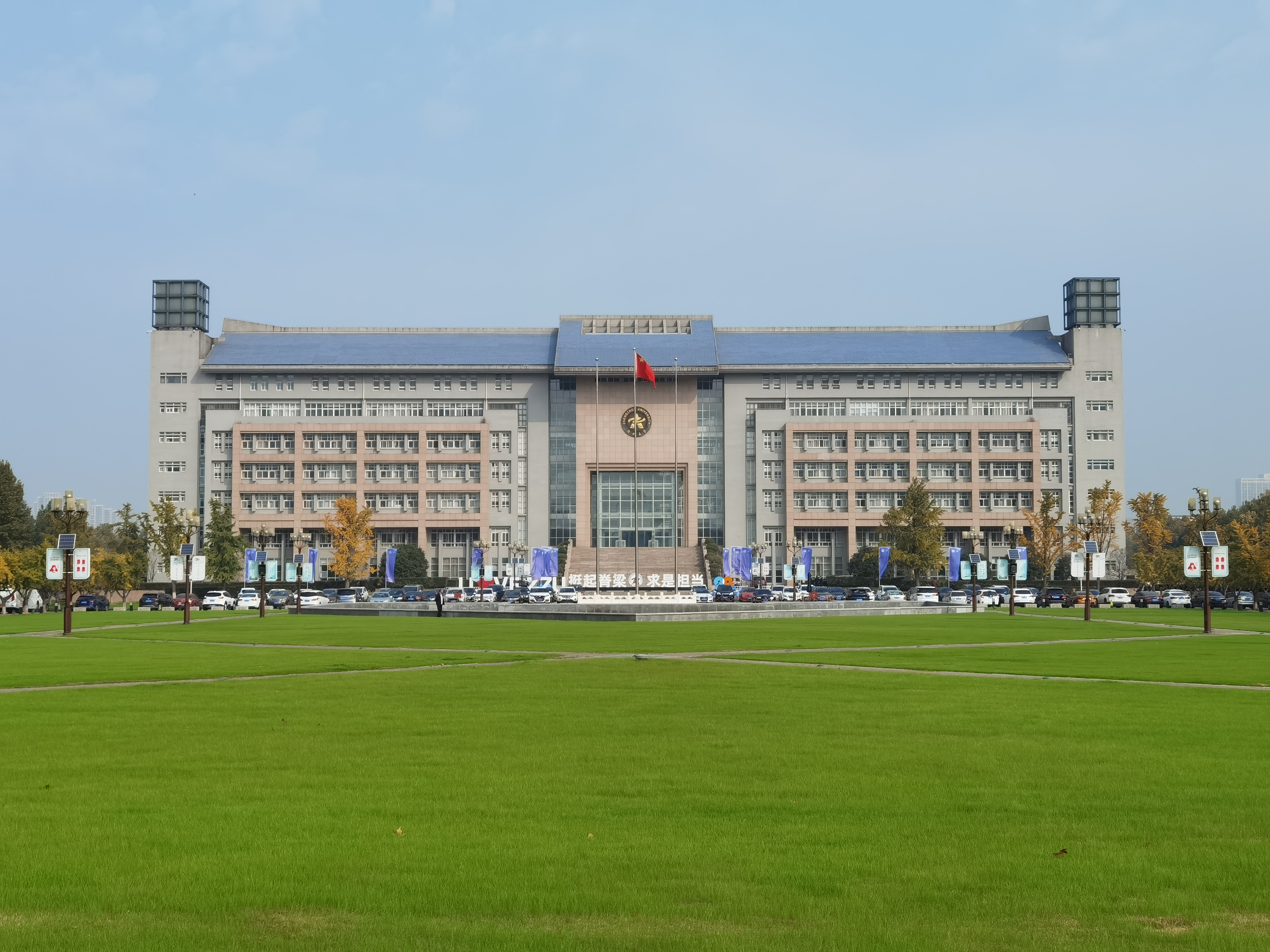
Administration building of Zhengzhou University

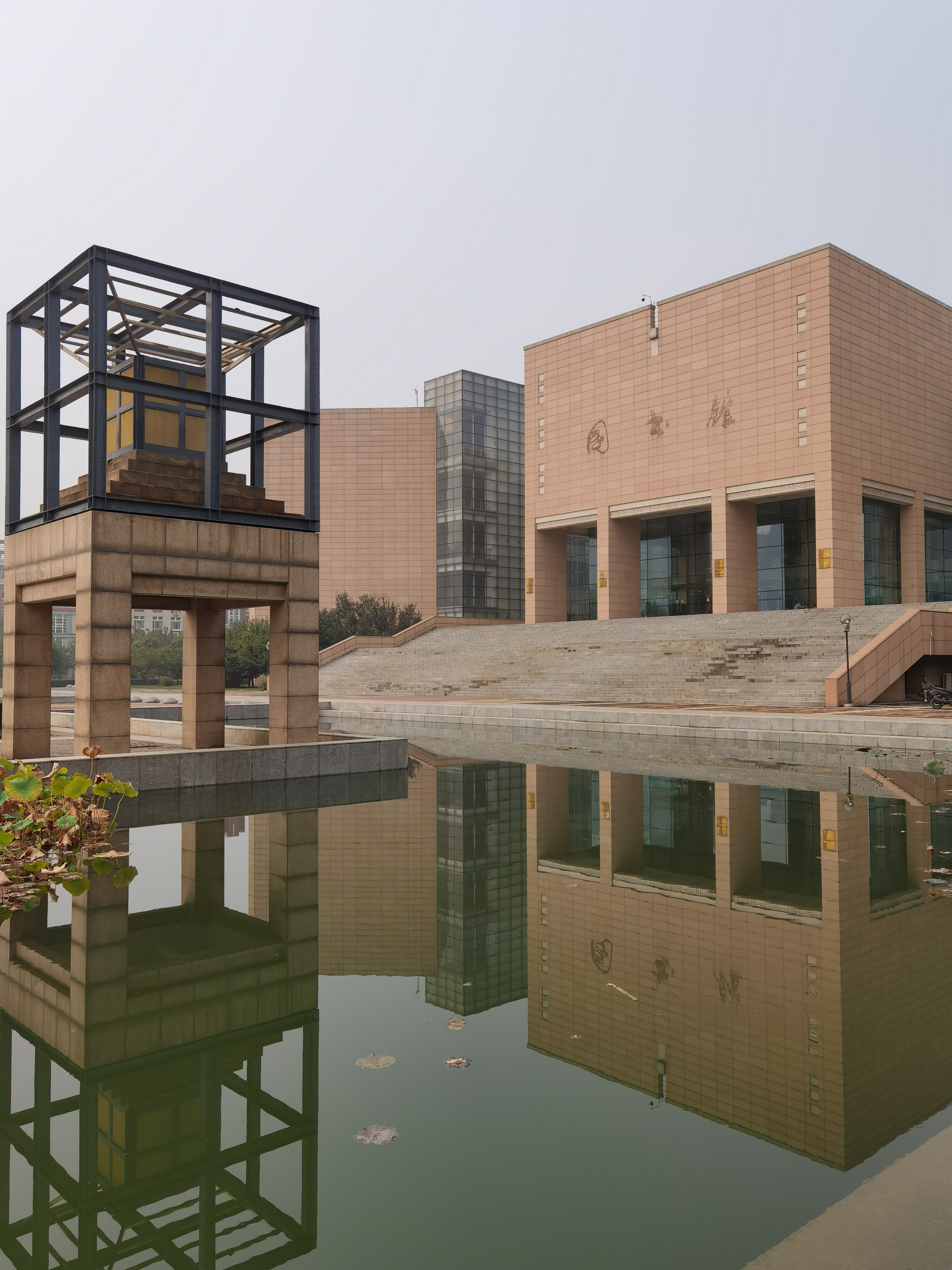
Zhengzhou University Library

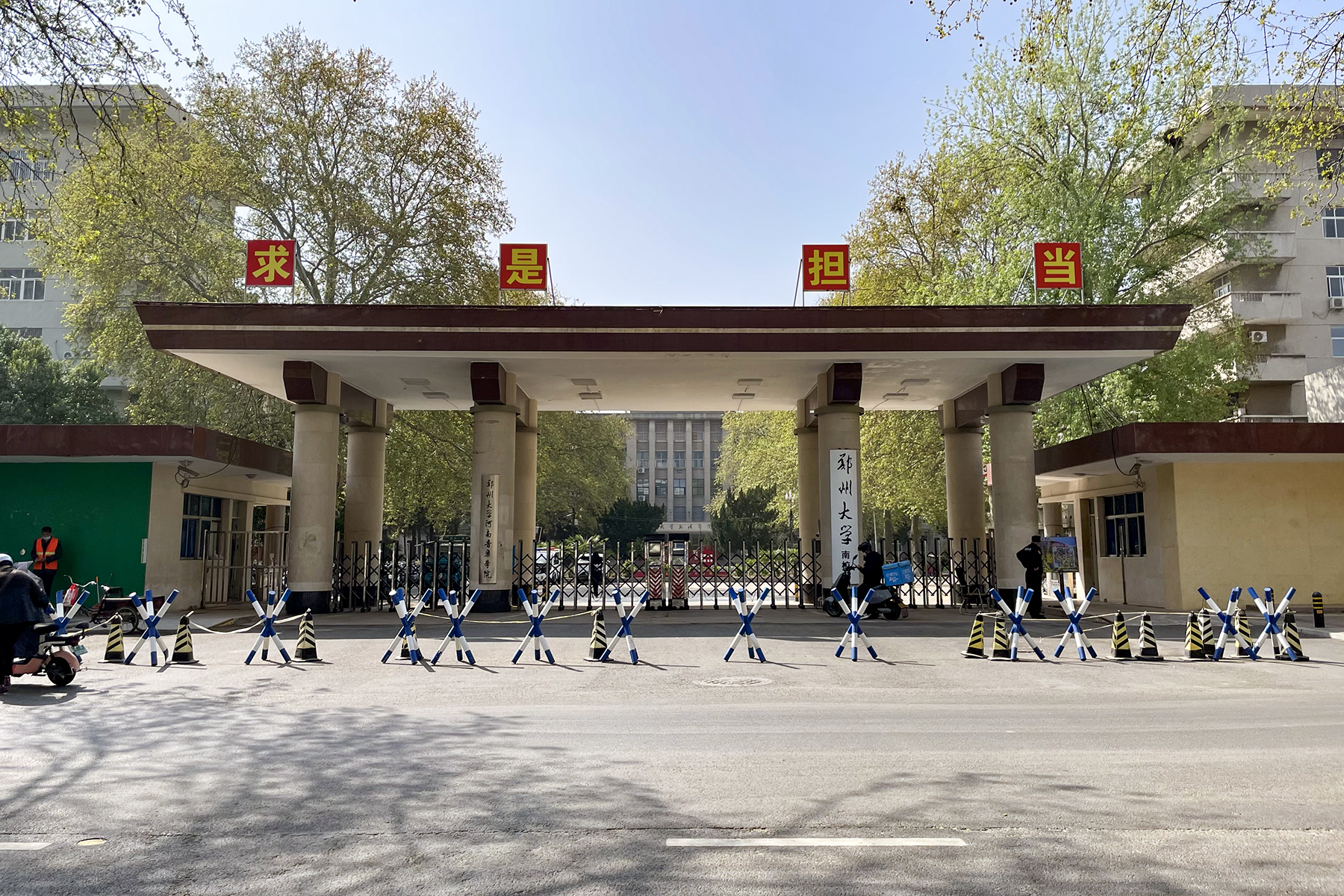
North Gate of the South Campus of Zhengzhou University

== See also ==
- Shengda College
- Sias International University
