= Henan University =

Provincial public university in Henan, China

- 河南大学 (Chinese)
- Motto: 明德，新民，止于至善
- Motto in English: To illustrate illustrious virtue; to renovate the people; and to rest in the highest excellence
- Type: Public university
- Established: 1912; 114 years ago
- President: Song Chunpeng
- Vice-president: Sun Junjian, Yang Chunhua
- Location: Zhengzhou and Kaifeng, Henan, China; 34°48′41″N 114°22′10″E
- Campus: Three campuses: Minglun (original), Jinming (opened in 2002) and Longzi Lake (under construction)
- Colors
- Website: henu.edu.cn

Chinese name
- Simplified Chinese: 河南大学
- Traditional Chinese: 河南大學
Transcriptions
Standard Mandarin
- Hanyu Pinyin: Hénán Dàxué

Henan University (HENU; 河南大学) is a provincial public university in Zhengzhou and Kaifeng, Henan, China. It is affiliated with the Province of Henan and co-funded with the Ministry of Education. The university is part of the Double First-Class Construction.

Henan University maintains three campuses: two (Ming-lun and Jin-ming campus) in Kaifeng City and one (Long-zi Lake campus) in Zhengzhou City.

== History ==
The earliest predecessor of Henan University was founded in 1912 and was originally named Henan Preparatory School for Studying in Europe and America. In 1942, the school was upgraded to National Henan University. In 1952, the school was renamed Henan Normal University after adjustment of departments. It was later renamed Kaifeng Normal College and Henan Normal University. In 1984, the school was renamed Henan University. In June 2000, the original Henan University, Kaifeng Medical College, and Kaifeng Normal College merged to form the new Henan University. In 2022, the legal entity registration address of Henan University was changed from Kaifeng City to Zhengzhou City. As of December 2023, Henan University has opened 92 undergraduate admissions majors in Zhengzhou Longzi Lake, Kaifeng Minglun and Jinming campuses, covering a total area of more than 5,500 acres. There are 45 master's degree authorized first-level disciplines, 35 master's degree authorized categories, 21 doctoral degree authorized first-level disciplines, 20 post-doctoral research mobile stations. There are more than 4,700 faculty and staff, and more than 50,000 full-time students.

== Rankings ==
Henan University is ranked 301-400 in the world on the 2025 Academic Ranking of World Universities (ARWU), #391 on the CWTS Ranking of Leiden University, and #763 on the 2025 U.S. News Rankings. QS Ranking 2027 ranked Henan University as the 1201-1400 university in world.

== Campus Environment ==
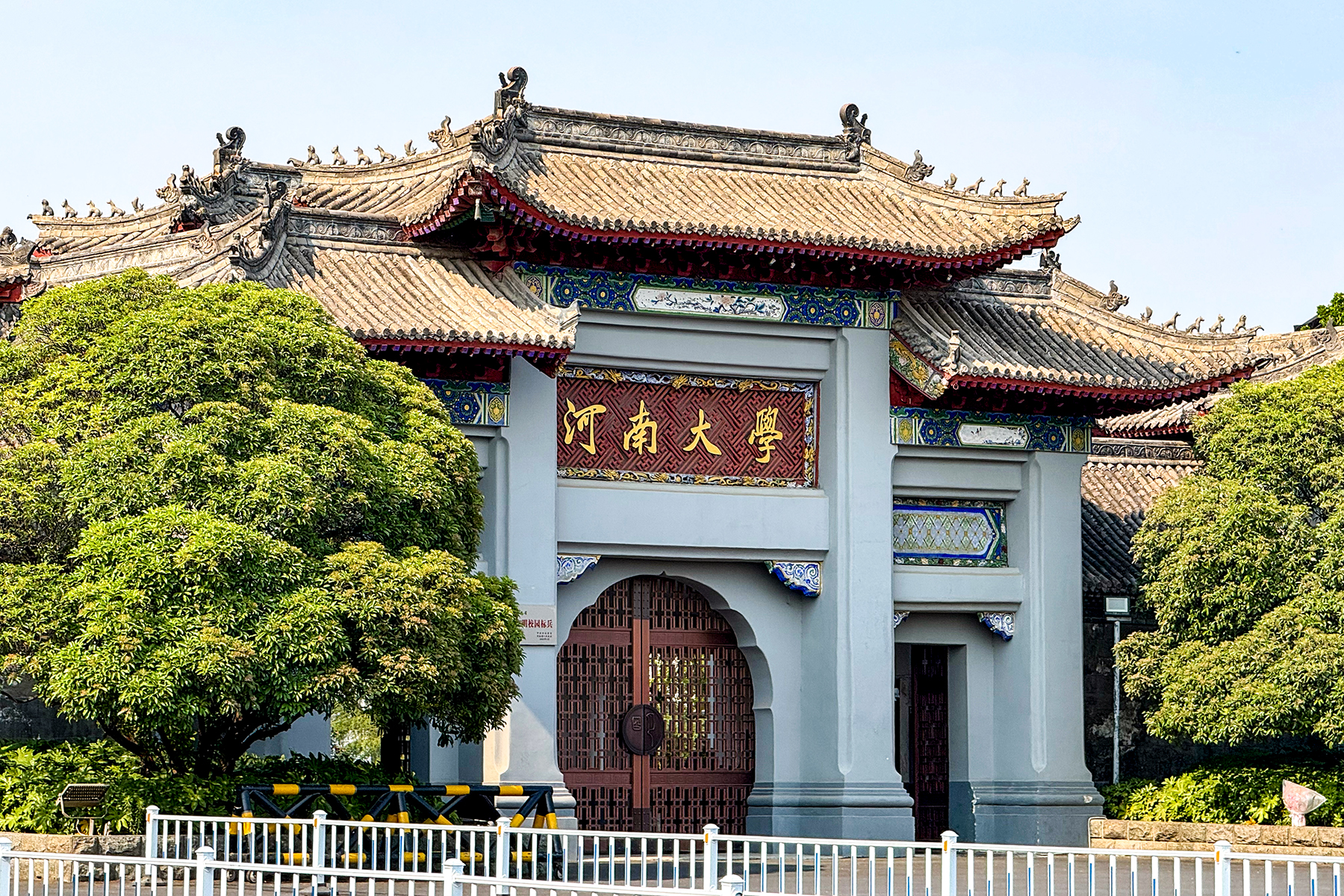
Main Gate

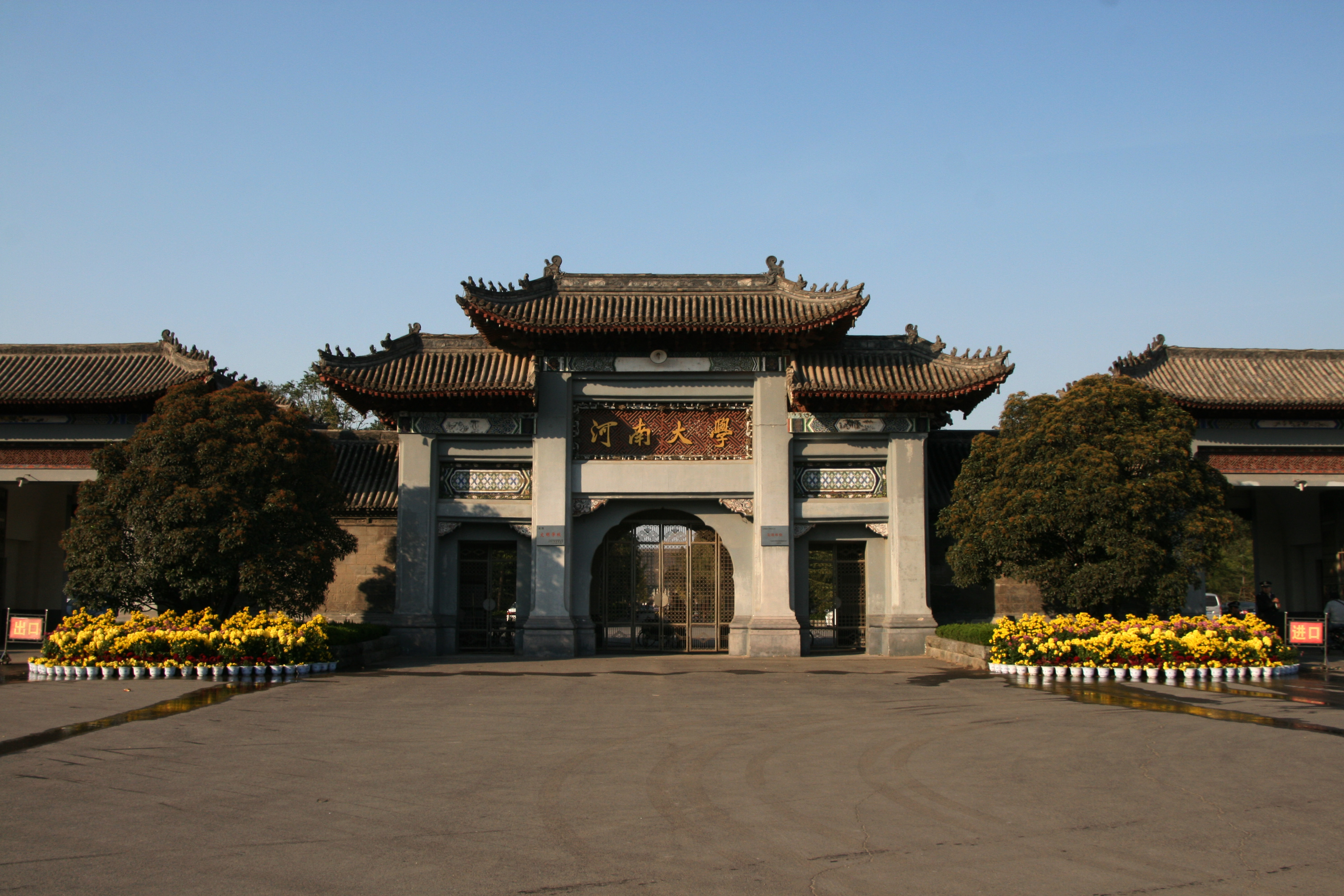
Main entrance

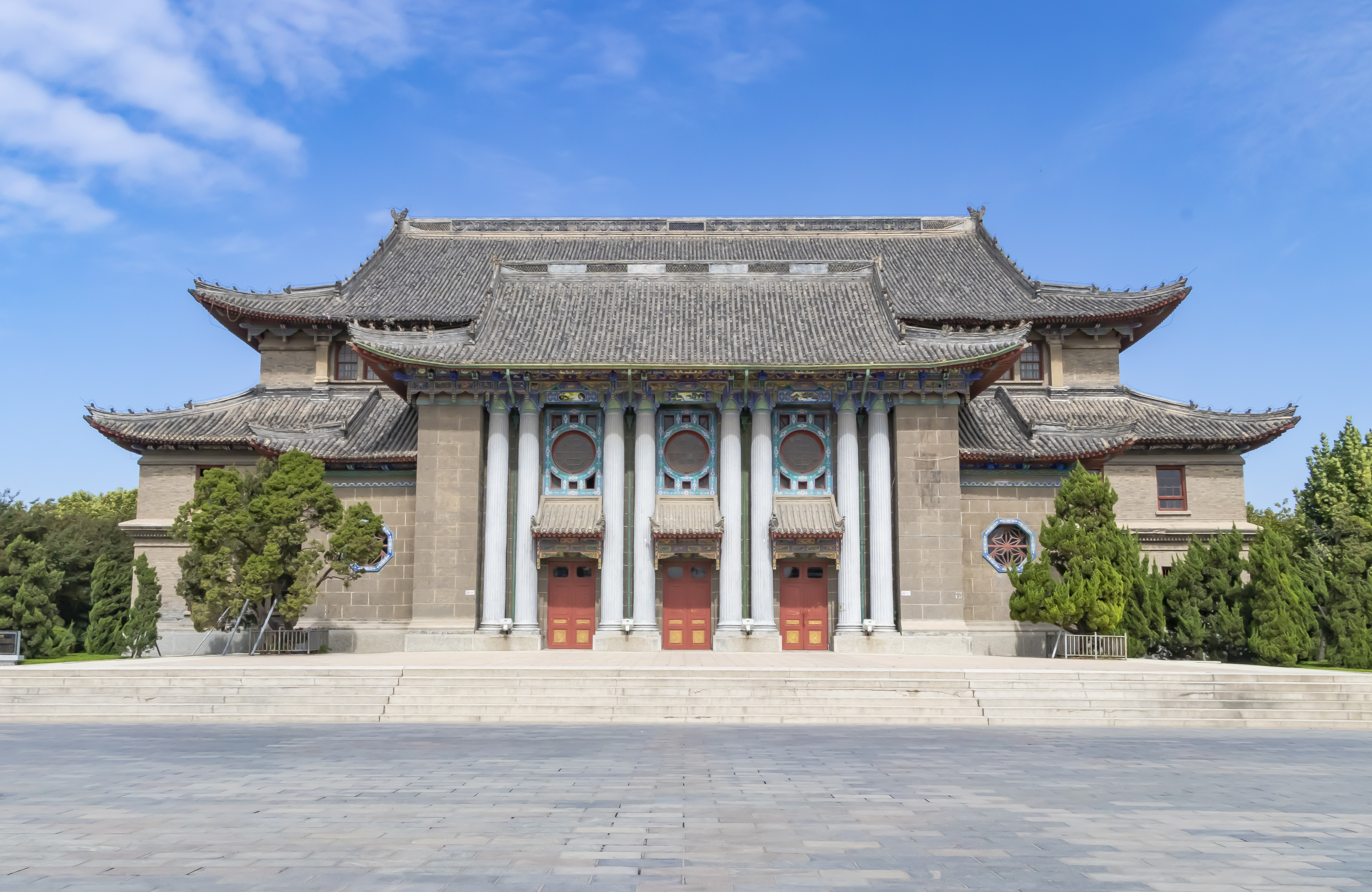
Henan University Auditorium photographed in 2020

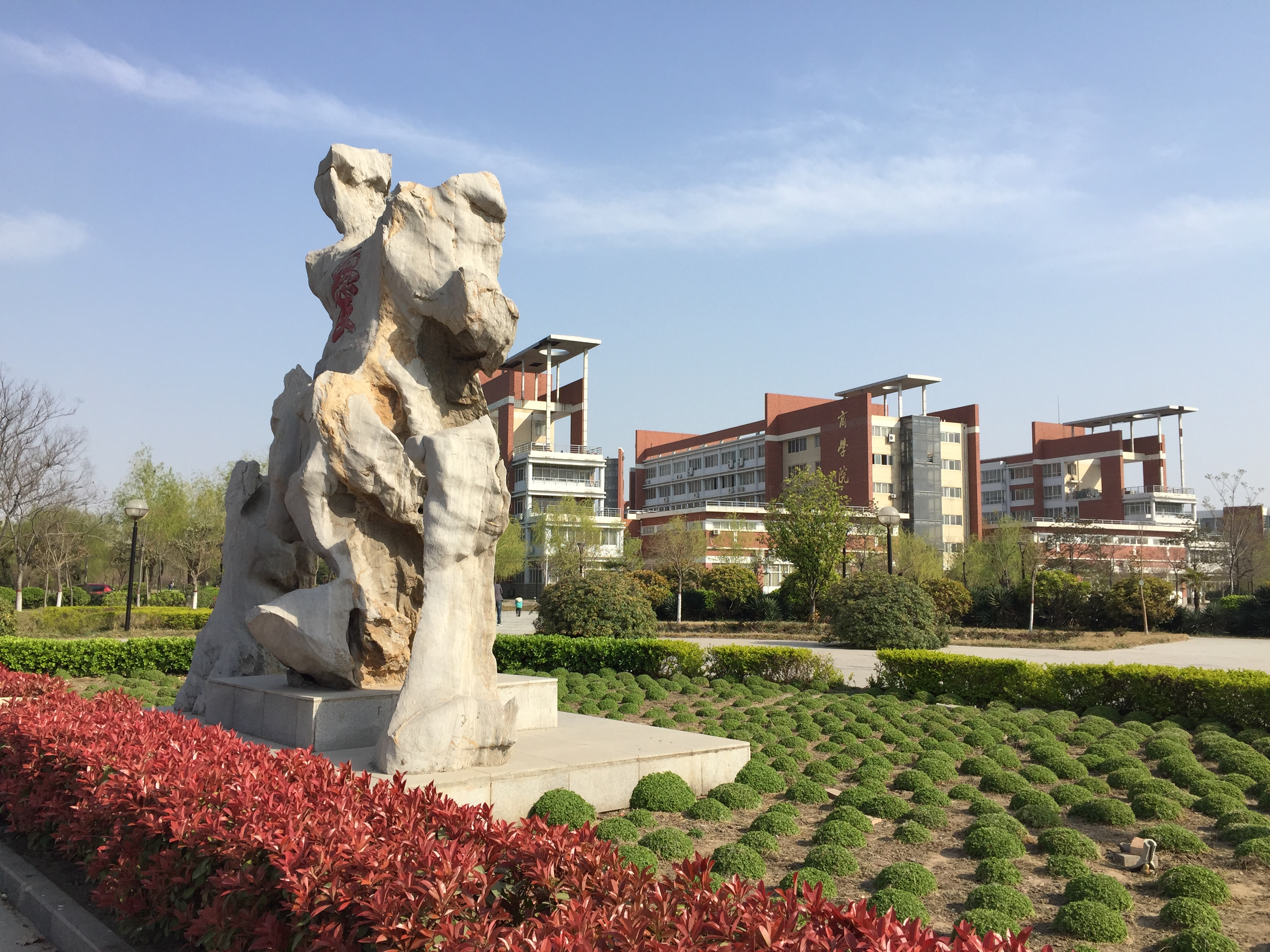
The stone carving in JinMing campus

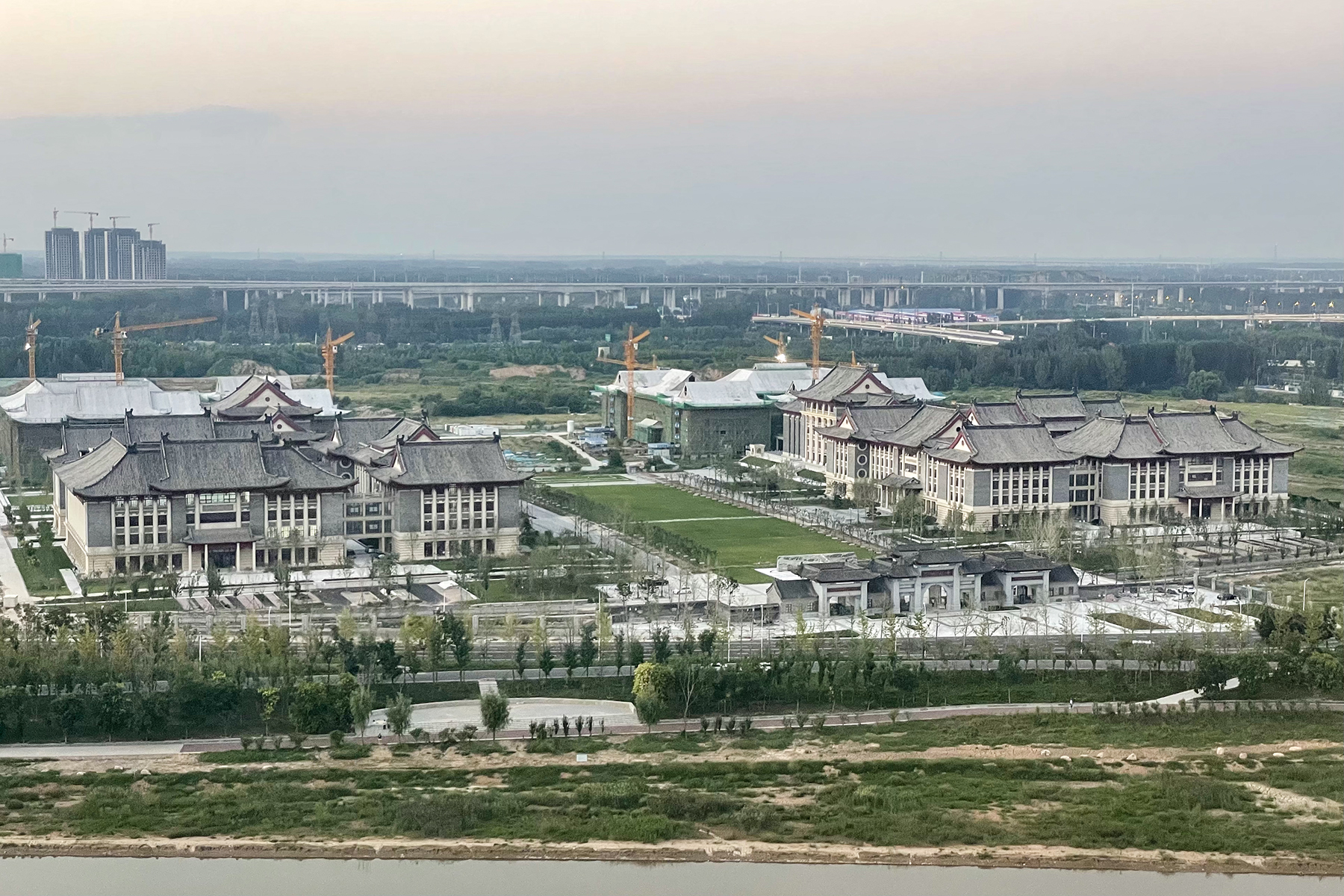
Longzihu Campus of Henan University

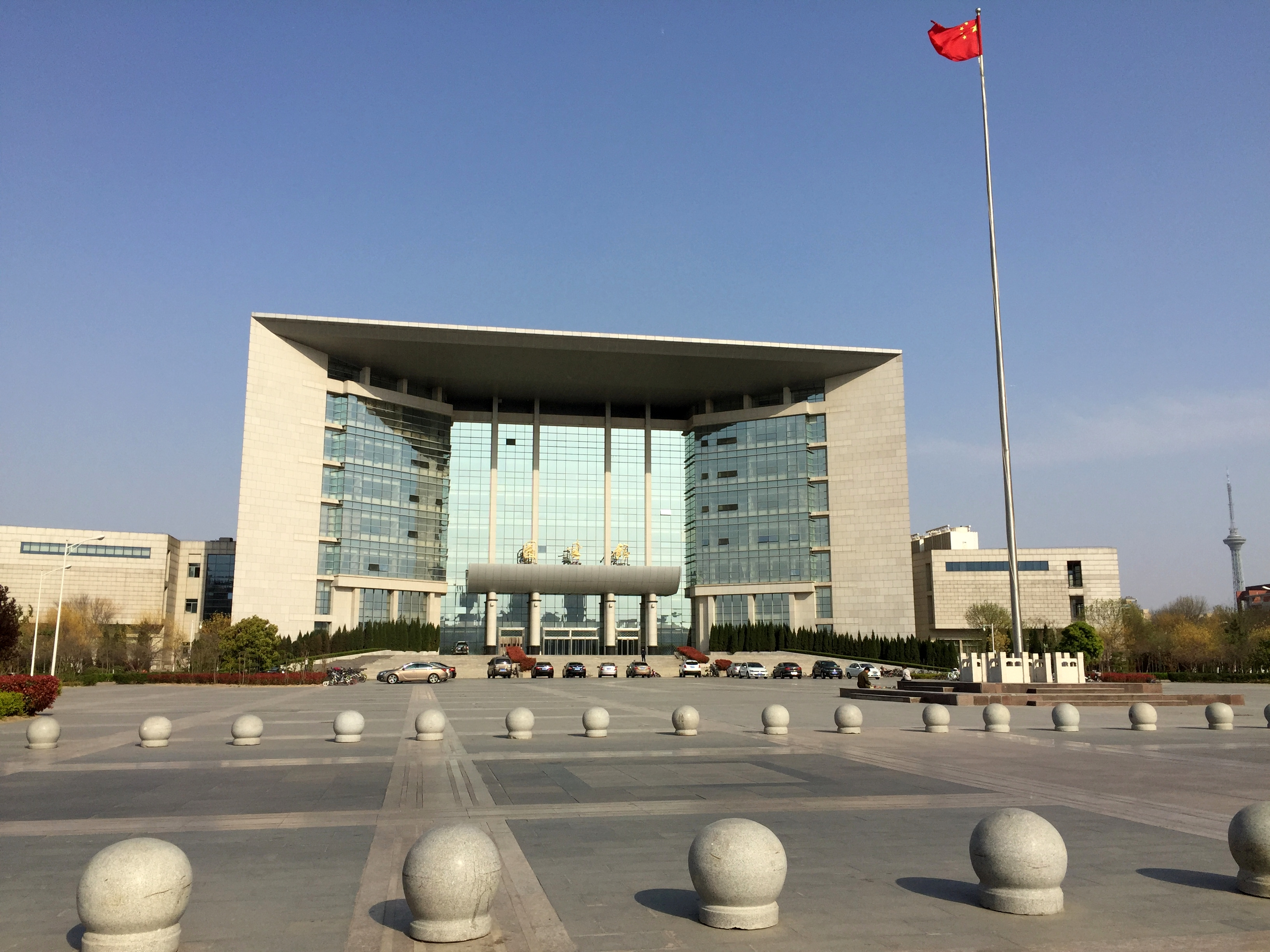
The JinMing library

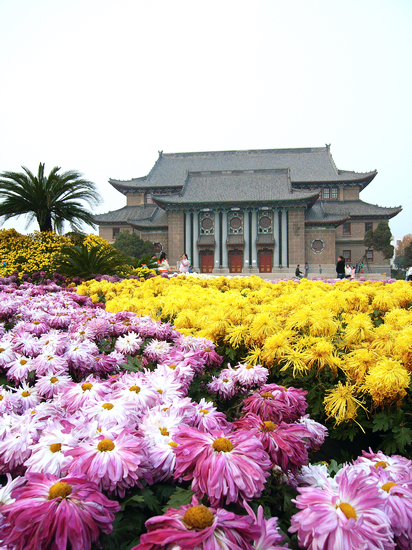
Chrysanthemum and Henan University Auditorium

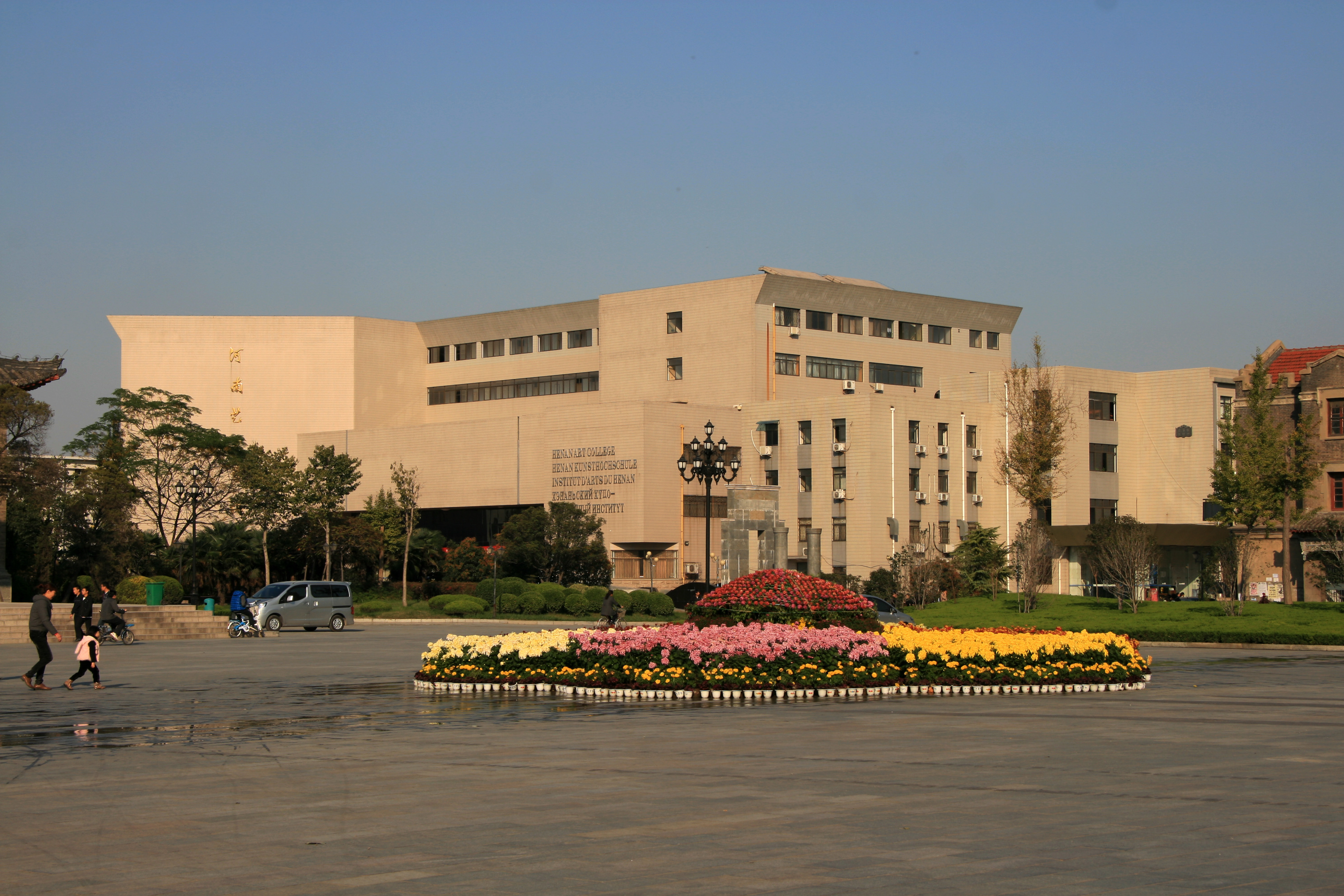
College of Fine Arts, Henan University

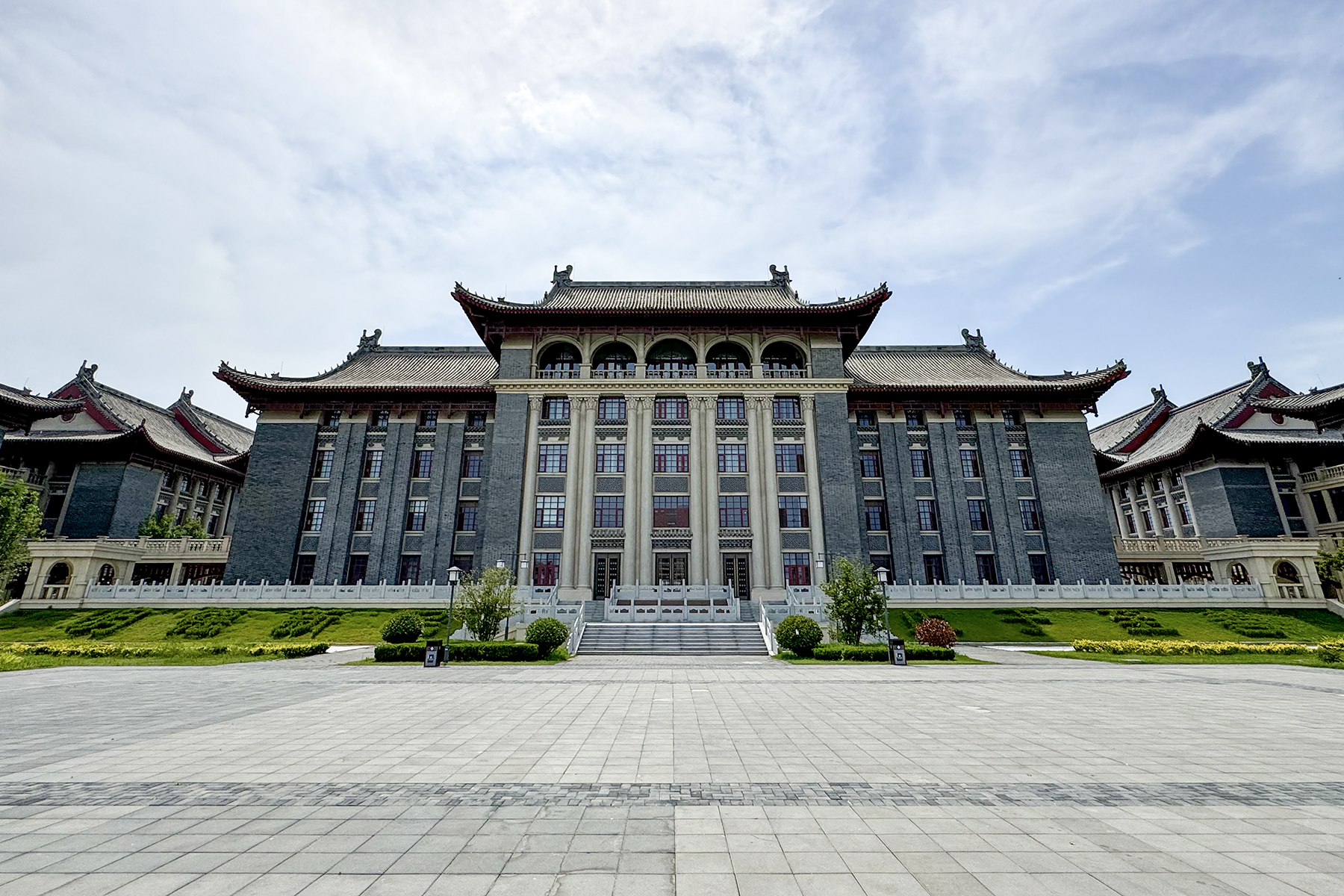
Henan University Longzihu Campus

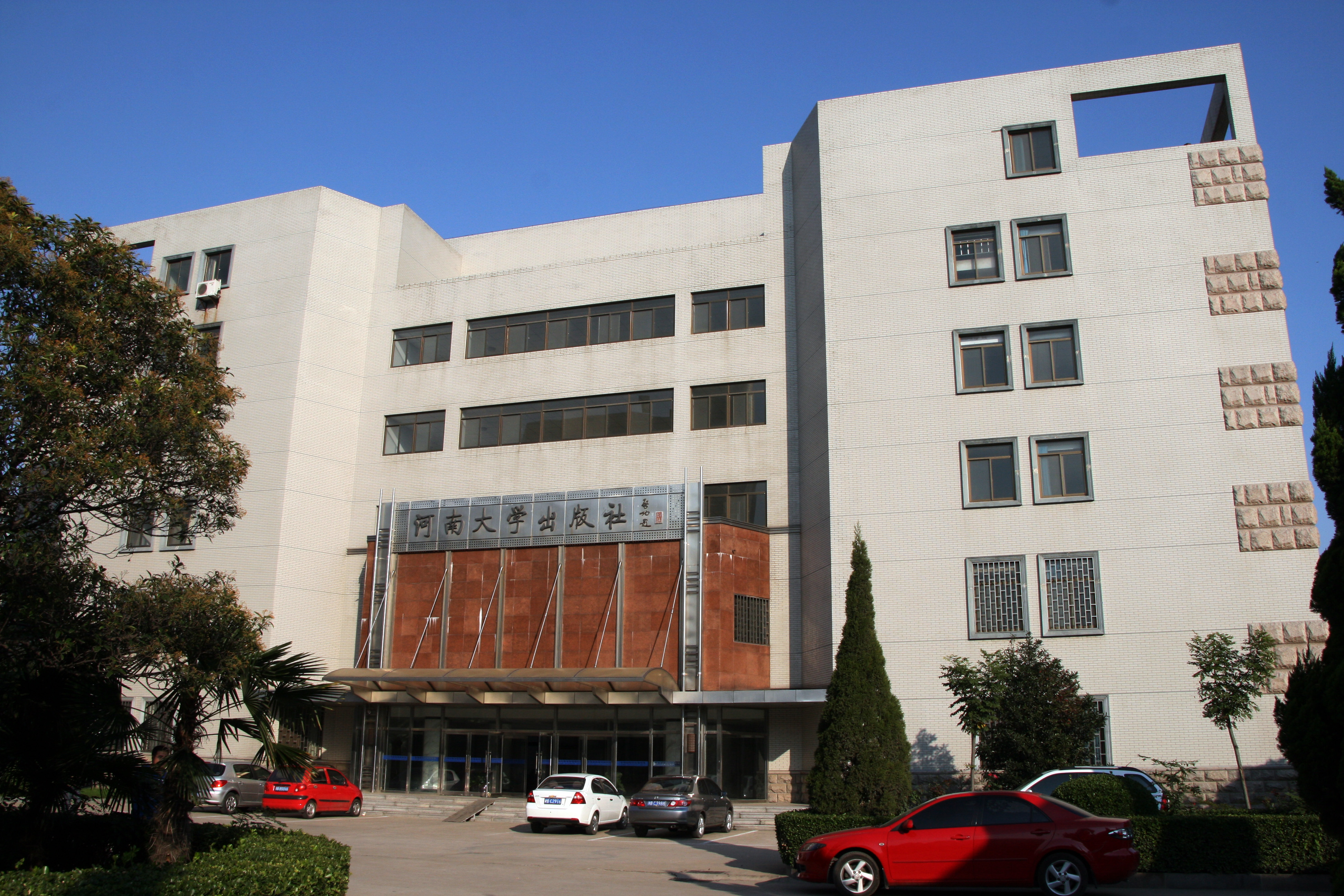
Henan University Publishing House

== Bibliography ==
- Sheridan, James E. (1966). Chinese Warlord. The Career of Feng Yü-hsiang. Stanford, California: Stanford University Press.
