= 2022 Shanghai COVID-19 outbreak =

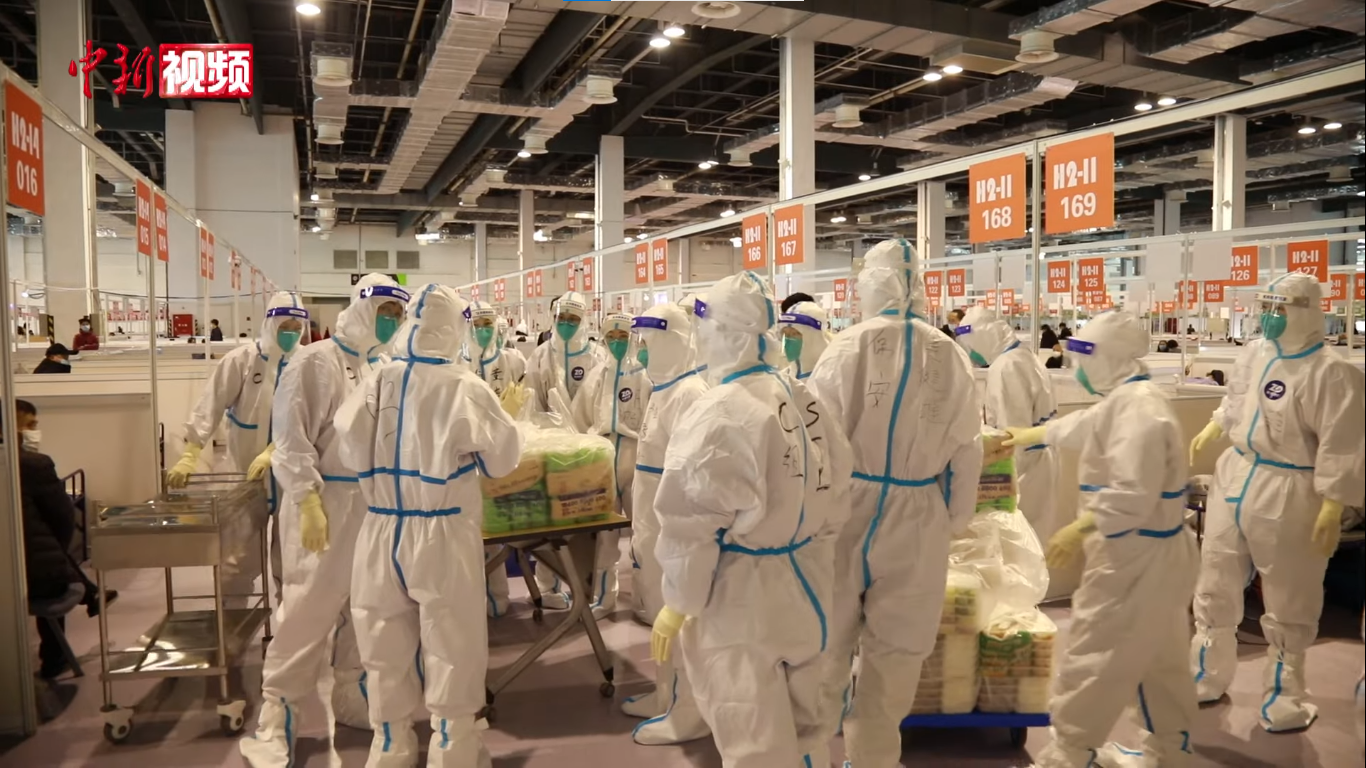
- Beds at Shanghai Expo Exhibition Hall during Shanghai 2022 COVID-19 pandemic
- Disease: COVID-19
- Pathogen: SARS-CoV-2
- Location: Shanghai and other cities in China
- Index case: February 28, 2022
- Date: February 28, 2022 – August 7, 2022 (5 months, 1 week and 3 days duration)
- Confirmed cases: 63,516 (Note: The Chinese case definition differs from that of the WHO. In the COVID-19 diagnosis and treatment guidelines, ninth edition, a "confirmed" case needs to both be positive on a nucleic acid test and satisfy the clinical presentations for a "suspected" case, which requires more than respiratory symptoms. Ones that test positive but do not meet such criteria are labelled "asymptomatic" (even though there may be symptoms not meeting the criteria). In contrast, positivity is sufficient to warrant a "confirmed case" in the WHO definition. This article uses the WHO definition by adding up both reported numbers and subtracting those reported as "asymptomatic turned confirmed". The Johns Hopkins University CSSE data uses the same algorithm, and should agree with this number as it updates.) (as of July 21, 24:00)
- Severe cases: 318 + 52 "critical" (as of April 28, 24:00)
- Recovered: 26,411 + 317,060 asymptomatic (as of April 28 24:00) (Note: "Confirmed" and "asymptomatic" recoveries are counted and termed differently in official reports. The former is described as "cured and discharged" (治愈出院), while the latter is described as "medical observation finished" (解除医学观察).)
- Deaths: 337 (as of April 28, 24:00)

A COVID-19 outbreak in the city of Shanghai, China began on February 28, 2022, and ended on August 7, 2022. The outbreak was caused by the Omicron variant and became the most widespread in Shanghai since the pandemic began two years prior. Authorities responded with mass COVID-19 testing and a strict lockdown of the city in an effort to uphold China's zero-COVID policy; the latter marked the largest one in the country since the lockdown of Hubei in early 2020. The outbreak caused substantial economic and social disruption across Shanghai with consequences felt elsewhere, and led to the spread of COVID-19 to other parts of China, including Beijing, Guangdong, and Hunan.

== Background ==
The COVID-19 pandemic is an ongoing viral pandemic of coronavirus disease 2019. It began in early 2020 as an outbreak in Hubei province, China, which prompted a strict lockdown. The Chinese government's response since then has been to pursue a zero-COVID strategy, aiming to eliminate the virus altogether. However, the increased transmissibility of the SARS-CoV-2 Omicron variant that emerged in late 2021 has posed challenges.

Since 2020, nearly 40% of international arrivals to China came through Shanghai. Shanghai also had a relatively large number of imported cases. By March 14, the number of cases reported as coming from outside mainland China was 4345, compared to 473 local cases. Shanghai authorities had previously taken a "more relaxed" approach to the pandemic compared to other Chinese cities. Doctor Zhang Wenhong of the Shanghai Medical Treatment Expert Group, said the control of COVID-19 in Shanghai is like "catching a mouse in the ceramic shop", and said maintaining a normal manufacturing industry and public life is important. Due to the Omicron variant, Shanghai's COVID-19 response had been challenged.

== Outbreak ==
On February 28, a 56-year-old vaccinated woman came to Tongji Hospital with a fever and was confirmed positive on March 1. This case became patient zero in the outbreak. After confirmation of her case, her dance group had at least 8 people test positive as well.

After confirming a positive diagnosis, the risk levels of some areas of Shanghai were raised from "low risk" to "middle risk". According to Shanghai's information office, the main source for the spread of the outbreak was the Huating Hotel, a previously designated quarantine site for inbound travelers. In response, the Shanghai World Expo Exhibition & Convention Center was converted into a temporary hospital on March 26, 2022. By March 27, just before Shanghai started area-separated testing, a total of 16,013 people had tested positive for COVID-19. Additional temporary quarantine centers in the Shanghai New International Expo Center opened on 29 March 2022.

By April 8, there had been a total of 131,524 people tested positive, with a single severe case. About 90 percent of the cases were "asymptomatic".

By April 17, according to China National Radio, Shanghai had 16 severe cases, all having pre-existing health conditions, with only 1 of them being vaccinated. On the same day, officials reported 3 deaths of COVID-19 infected patients, with all deaths also being linked to other underlying health conditions, such as diabetes. On April 18, officials reported 7 more deaths with ages ranging from 60 to 101; 6 of them were aged above 70.

On April 22, officials announced they would escalate COVID lockdown restrictions and further tighten lockdown measures. Some of the new measures include evacuating people to disinfect their homes and placing electronic door alarms to warn if infected people are trying to leave.

By April 30, officially all of the deaths were caused by other severe symptoms. On the same day, the first fangcang quarantine hospital (fang1cang1 方舱, literally "portable building") was officially closed.

=== Graphs ===
View source data.
View source data.

Data source: National Health Commission of China

== Government response to the outbreak ==
=== Lockdown ===
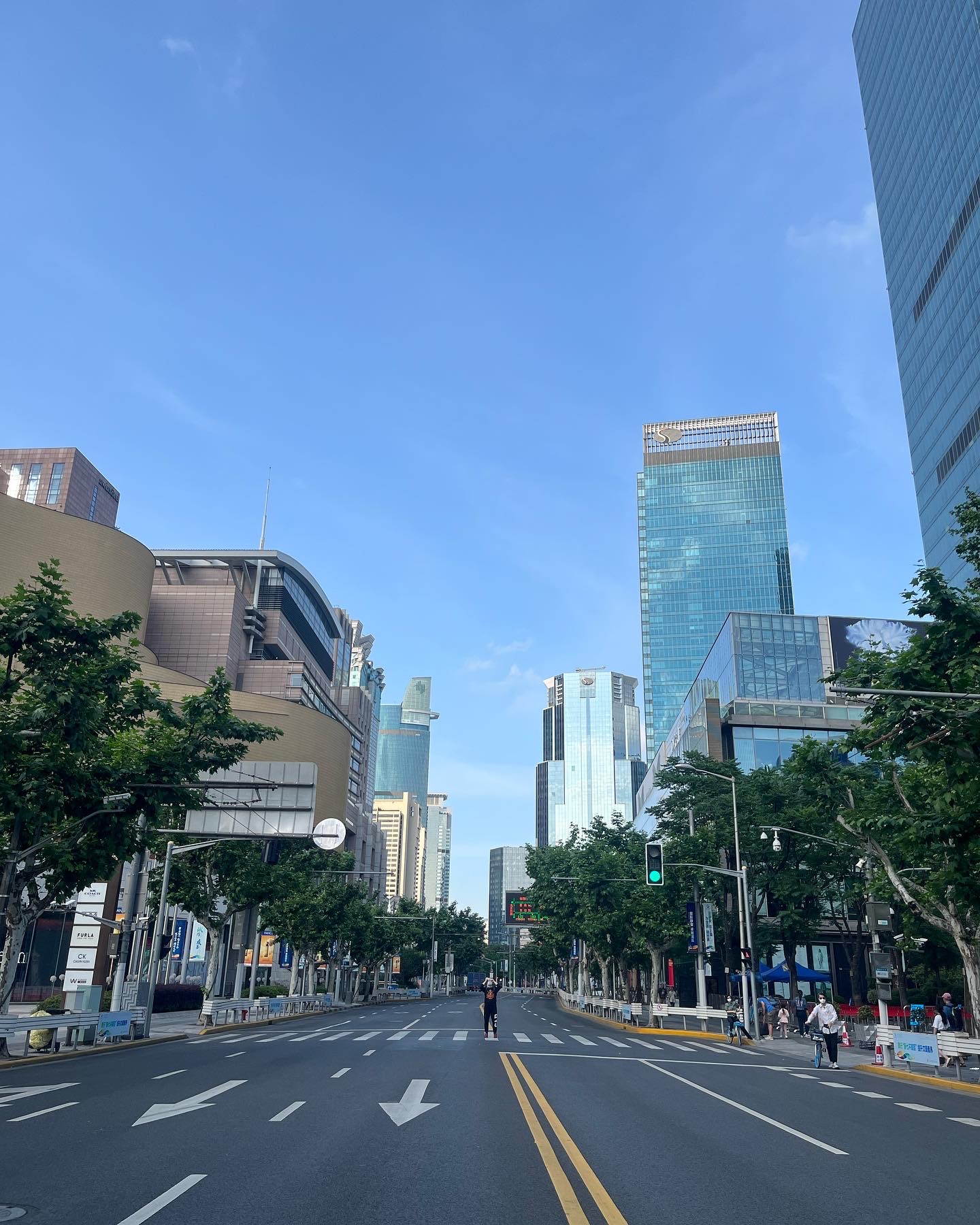
Empty West Nanjing Road after COVID-19 restrictions in some areas were lifted

On February 28, 2022, the introduction of travel restrictions was announced by the Shanghai Municipal People's Government and negative PCR testing within 48 hours of travel became mandatory. In addition to the negative PCR testing, travelling from "control areas" to "prevention areas" was conditioned by a 14 days mandatory quarantine at citizens' own residences (quarantine in commercial facilities such as hotels did not qualify) within the "prevention area". On March 15, Civil Aviation Administration of China announced that international flights into Shanghai would be diverted to other cities.

Shanghai decided to adopt "area-separated and batch-separated control" (Chinese: 分区分批防控) starting on March 28. On March 27, many markets got crowded, with some scholars arguing these conditions were due to city closure. This was extended on April 1. Some media suspected that cases were underreported. Wang Keyu, a staff member at Huashan Hospital stated that (locally-available) COVID-19 vaccines offered weak protection against the Omicron variant, and that a wide range of COVID-19 testing control was important and necessary. By March 29, over 9.1 million people had been tested by roughly 17,000 testers in roughly 6,300 testing areas. By April 1, over 18 million people had been tested.

From April 1, most areas of Shanghai were under three-level control. The levels were "closed areas" (封控区), "control areas" (管控区), and "prevention areas" (防控区) and typically spanned the size of a residential complex, later (in June) granulizing into individual buildings.

On April 5, the lockdown was expanded to encompass the entire city, affecting the population of 25 million. On April 11, Shanghai published the list of closed areas, control areas, and prevention areas. On April 11, Shanghai officially announced all areas are under three-level control and clarified. Closed area contains people who tested positive for COVID-19 in the neighborhood, the "7-7" quarantine policy is required to follow, during 7-day closing period, if there was no people who tested positive, the restriction will be the same as the restrictions of a "control area". People in control areas can, with limit, collect essential supplies within the neighborhood. Neighborhoods which are listed as prevention areas have no reported case within 14 days. People in prevention areas should only travel within the street. In practice, additional restrictions are levied by the local residents' committee.

Since April 22, Shanghai officials said Shanghai have to follow the "static management" (静态管理) policy On April 27, Shanghai officials announced that some hospitals in Shanghai will temporarily suspend their service.

On May 6, multiple areas (including "prevention areas") was put into a so-called "silent period" (静默期), banning all entry and exit, including delivery shipment. The stated rationale was that some positive cases appeared in prevention areas, and for a "final assault" (攻坚) on the case count. On May 17, another wave of "silencing" started, this time spanning the entirety of multiple districts, again under the name of a "final assault".

On May 6, In Shanghai, which is entering its second month of lockdown, city officials said cases have been declining since Apr 22 and its outbreak is under control.

From May 29, plans were announced to ease the lockdown on June 1. The adjustment entails:

- People entering public areas and taking public transport must now show a negative PCR test result taken with 72 hours. The original requirement was 48 hours. The standard for leaving the city remains unchanged: negative PCR test taken within 48 hours must be shown along with a negative antigen test within 24 hours.
- A ban on residents' committees adding additional restrictions in all areas except those marked "closed", "control", "mid-risk", and "high-risk". This has attracted criticism from these committees, who claimed that their extra restrictions were not their own decisions, but unwritten telephone orders from above.
- Lockdown measures on businesses are to be lifted as an effort to help the economy that has been hit hard with strict restrictions.

The adjustments were made to "promote epidemic prevention and control as well as economic and social development, and resume work and a return to normal life," the city official added in the May 29 press conference. City officials also emphasized that the term "lifting the lockdown" (解封) is not to be used, as "static management" is not "lockdown" (封城).

The lockdown was lifted at midnight June 1, with many rushing to the grocery store to restock on food. Shanghai declared that it would do its best to recover the losses caused by the epidemic.

On June 3, four neighborhoods in Jing'an and Pudong were put back into "closed" lockdown and designated as "mid-risk" due to seven new cases found the prior day. On June 7, some more areas are restricted to "closed" area.

In early July, many cases reported is related to a person who visited illegally operated KTV.

=== Mass testing and Isolation ===
On March 4, Shanghai instituted a policy of mass COVID testing. In every building with a positive COVID-19 case, all residents were required to undertake individual "nucleic acid" COVID tests. Other areas undertook pooled COVID-19 testing.

Shanghai residents were required to undertake nucleic acid tests throughout the lockdown, ranging from multiple times per week to once per day. Tests were initially posted on the Health Cloud APP, but over the course of the lockdown migrated to mini programs on Alipay or WeChat. Tests were required for all regions regardless of risk, and would generate a colored health code (Chinese: 健康码; pinyin: jiànkāng mǎ). Each district was responsible for implementing their own system around the code Green codes were issued to people with negative antigen tests, yellow for close contacts of positive cases or those who did not test, and red for positive cases. Enforcement of health codes was left up to individual districts and communities; some locations forbade residents from leaving their neighborhoods regardless of the health code.

Residents that refused COVID testing would see their health code turned red. Some neighborhoods threatened permanent red-code status for those who refused or resisted transportation to a quarantine center, with one location promising on April 12 that such people would "never be rehabilitated" (永不摘帽).

Shanghai authorities converted schools, residential buildings and other structures into quarantine facilities when designated facilities ran short on space.

=== Education ===
As the caseload in the outbreak was growing, there were messages like "Shanghai will stop school" on Weibo. On March 8, a Shanghai official denied the possibility, but for students absent due to COVID-19 the platform "Air Class" would allow for education to continue. On March 12, in-person school was suspended, with students able to participate using platforms such as "Shanghai V-Class" or "Shanghai Education" instead. On May 7, Official announced the National College Entrance Examination in Shanghai would be extended to June, Senior High School Entrance Examination in Shanghai would be extended to July, with lab and English speaking test sections being removed and counted as a full credit towards final score.

Shanghai Ministry of Education stated all middle and high school student could come to school before June 14.

=== Transportation ===
On April 13, the Public Security Bureau of Shanghai announced that people in prevention areas must not enter "closing areas"; nonessential automobiles would also be prohibited.

=== Law enforcement ===
On March 22, two people posted information on a group chat saying Shanghai was about to perform a "city closure"(feng1cheng2 封城). The next day, the public security bureau of Shanghai investigated both for the crime of posting false information intentionally. On March 26, Wu Fan, the vice-principal of Shanghai Medical College stated that Shanghai would not go into lockdown because of how much the city contributed to the economy of China.

In general, mainland China has strict laws controlling crime related to pandemic management. According to Chinese jurist Luo Xiang's Criminal Law Textbook, people who don't obey basic isolation rules when they know they have tested positive for COVID-19 have committed the crime of harming public safety (Chinese: 以危险方法危害公共安全罪). Other people who don't obey isolation rules but caused heavy losses may get accused of the crime of distraction of disease prevention (Chinese: 妨碍传染病防治罪). People who post allegedly false content about COVID-19 control policies may be accused of the crime of posting false information (Chinese: 编造、故意传播虚假信息罪).

On April 18, the Public Security Bureau of Shanghai posted that the message "The women who gave preterm birth failed to ask for help and died because of hemorrhage" was false information. The women gave natural birth and were sent to a hospital on time and successfully gave birth. The publisher Zhang had been captured.

There have been cases of fraud and illegal marketing during the Shanghai lockdown. On April 16, the legal representative of a medical company was arrested for selling 29,000 masks that did not meet health standards. On April 19, a man was arrested for selling rotten pork for over 320,000 yuan.

== Impacts ==
The outbreak and the strict response had significant economic impacts. Oil prices fell globally. By mid-April, the lockdown had led to Shanghai residents complaining of food shortages.

On April 12, the United States ordered all nonessential workers at the Shanghai consulate to leave.

During late March, Zhang Wenhong, a doctor who made many speeches during the pandemic, was absent fomr a few events, some media suspected that this was a "sign" made by Shanghai government.

== Popular culture depictions ==
After the outbreak, artist Wang Yuanchao created the Shanghainese-language song "Steamed Eggs with Clams" (Chinese: 蛤蜊炖蛋), (Note: This song's title is approximately homophonic with "isolate and wait" (隔离等待), moreso in Shanghainese.) which described how people in Shanghai work together to prevent the spread of COVID-19. The song got considerable attention on the internet upon its publication. On March 27, the song "First Snap Up Groceries, Then Do Nucleic Acid" (Chinese: 先抢菜，再做核酸) was published on the WeChat Public Account; it got over 100,000 views in the first ten minutes after being published. Afterwards, the three authors renamed the song to "Buy Groceries" and uploaded it to NetEase Cloud Music, where it received more than 200,000 views. The song uses with humorous Shanghainese lyrics.

A gala celebrating the Covid response was planned on April 12 but got cancelled after public outcry.

An April 22 montage called The Sounds of April (四月之声) featured clips of government announcers and events such as pet-killing, child separation, and medical delays. The author also included some positive events like people sharing foods with in area and stated it was meant to be neutral. Many posts, including the original one, containing the montage were quickly taken down and netizens attempted to fight its removal on WeChat by various edits. Some users even tried to change their username on platforms like Weibo to protest. The original video had been played more than 5 million times before it was taken down.

In late April to early May, online personality Dawn Wong produced Fake News with Alison Alison (爱丽森假新闻), an English-language, Chinese-subtitled satirical news show about lockdown conditions, from her residence in Shanghai. She posted two episodes to Weibo and YouTube, both being censored on the former. She was arrested on May 11 shortly after posting the second episode and was released after a two-hour "talk" resulting in the unlisting of these videos from YouTube.

Wuheqilin created his artwork Shanghai Must Not Fall during the outbreak. The illustration depicts hazmat-clad figures shutting gates as a swarm of snakes attempt to pour through. Wuheqilin dedicated the artwork to the "fighters in Shanghai".

=== Online protests ===
Some content saw takedown by the authorities.

- A rap song titled New Slave was uploaded to YouTube and saw some dissemination on WeChat timelines.
- A clip of the "Do You Hear the People Sing?" sequence from the 2012 film version of the musical Les Misérables circulated on Chinese social media in protest of the lockdown.
- On April 28, some Shanghai residents self-organized an at-home protest on WeChat. They went to their balconies at night and banged pots in demand of food. The authorities quickly took the organizing posts down and claimed involvement of "foreign influences".
- On May 11, a group of epidemic prevention workers in white hazmat suits forced a citizen who was claimed to be a close contact to go to a quarantine facility due to CCP's Zero-COVID policy. The citizen told them that they had no right to force him to go to a quarantine facility because it was against the law. After an epidemic prevention worker threatened punishment all the way to his 3rd generation, the citizen responded, "We are the last generation, thank you!"
  A report from China Digital Times pointed out that this video was forwarded widespread online and commented on by netizens, expressing remonstrance towards the three-child policy. The original video was taken down on the same day.

== Controversies ==
=== Non-COVID medical delay and deaths ===
The lockdown has caused a number of deaths due to an inability to receive appropriate medical care as COVID testing was required to access any emergency services and any hospital that had treated a Covid positive patient needed to undergo disinfection. High-profile individuals who died included a former Fudan University professor Yu Huizhong, a Dongfang Hospital nurse Zhou Shengni, and violinist Chun Shunping. On April 14, an article on WeChat listed 12 deaths due to lockdown practices, but was deleted soon after. A crowd-sourced continuation of the effort on Airtable listed 186 deaths as of April 30.

Shanghai violinist Chen Shunping experienced a severe stomach ache and vomiting at night on April 13. Upon calling emergency services, he was told he would have to "wait in line". Later that night, he went to two different hospitals and was unable to receive medical service at either. Faced with immense pain, he committed suicide by jumping off a building.

A 58-year-old male was found dead at home on May 1, with rumors of death by starvation. The city fact-checking service interviewed paramedics and confirmed that the actual cause was cardiac arrest. The community also said that they took good care of the man prior to his death, knowing that he was not in good health, having regularly delivered food during the pandemic.

==== Suicides ====
On March 26, an old man is seen having died after falling off a residential building. The original poster suggested that the death was due to lack of access to medical help, but the family clarified that the dead has been allowed to regularly go to the hospital to the government-run fact checker.

On April 3, a Shanghai woman wanted to send her grandfather meals, but the distance between their homes was very far. She found a man to deliver the meals for her to Qingpu but did not ask for money. The next day, the woman transferred him 200 yuan by phone but was later criticized for paying too little when she shared her story online. On April 6, she committed suicide. Her parents and other online commentators called for the people who bullied her to be sued or punished.

On April 12, Hongkou District Health Department IT lead Qian Wenxiong killed himself, leaving behind his cancer-ridden wife. Many Chinese netizens believe his suicide was due to the stress under the zero-COVID policy. (Previous rumors inaccurately attributed the death either to Qian's wife or to another official named Cai Yongqiang and were "dispelled" by official sources.)

On April 26, a French citizen was seen on a two-minute-long video asking quarantine workers for help with suicide in three languages. He was subdued and later became stabilized. The French embassy confirmed his identity and commented that food shortage was likely not the reason.

=== Pet killing ===
On April 6, a community guard beat a Corgi to death after refusing a request to allow the dog to be taken with the owner into isolation. Later, the local community stated that they were worried that the dog may have been infected but acknowledged that they didn't "think very carefully" and would compensate the owner.

On April 7, the infected owner of a cat called the CDC about bringing their cat to quarantine. The CDC bluntly responded that the "only thing they could do was to wait to be taken away and to give up on their cat".

On May 9, live fish were recorded getting killed by ground impact at the entrance to a residential complex in Jingan. The local residents' committee explained that the group-buy organizer acquired permission for buying refrigerated fish, not the prohibited live fish actually delivered. The organizer chose to kill the fish outside the gate to comply.

=== Forced quarantine ===
According to a 19-minute recording, a woman and her husband were forced to go to a mobile cabin hospital, even though none of their family members were positive for COVID-19. They consented to leaving if tested positive, but policies had forced them to leave home because officials already believed they were positive for COVID-19. Shanghai officials replied saying that person in question was a 13-year-old girl, and they had already communicated with the family many times previously. and they had agreed at first, but this time they disagreed; according to the policy, they need to take them to a mobile cabin hospital. Officials also said that the results from the "Health Cloud" app may differ from the actual situation.

=== Child separation ===
A system for quarantining children, including infants, away from adults was implemented. The site in Jinshan was first reported online by desperate parents. The separation was described officially on April 2 as a policy to "quickly help" minors and involves "temporary guardians". On April 4, the health committee said that a system is in place to allow some children to be accompanied by their also COVID-positive parents. An online trend started where parents sought to become infected to stay with their children.

This system was described as a "humanitarian crisis" by a Radio France Internationale commentator. On March 31, the Consulate of France in Shanghai issued a protest to the Shanghai Government on behalf of 24 EU states.

=== Legality ===
In early May, constitutional academic Tong Zhiwei expressed his opposition to forced quarantine transport and home disinfection, stating that the authorities' legal basis (Public Security Penalties Law, Art. 50(1)) is nil – the law requires a state of emergency to be declared, but none has been. Around the same time, financial lawyer Liu Dali expressed his opposition to procedural problems in quarantine transport, namely lack of paperwork and an overly liberal definition of "contact" involving whole floors or even buildings. Both articles were quickly taken down on the Chinese internet, their Weibo accounts suspended, and bar associations warned not to distribute these articles.

== See also ==
- COVID-19 pandemic in Shanghai
- Transmission of COVID-19 § Surface (fomite) transmission
