= Zhang Wenhong =

Chinese doctor

- 张文宏
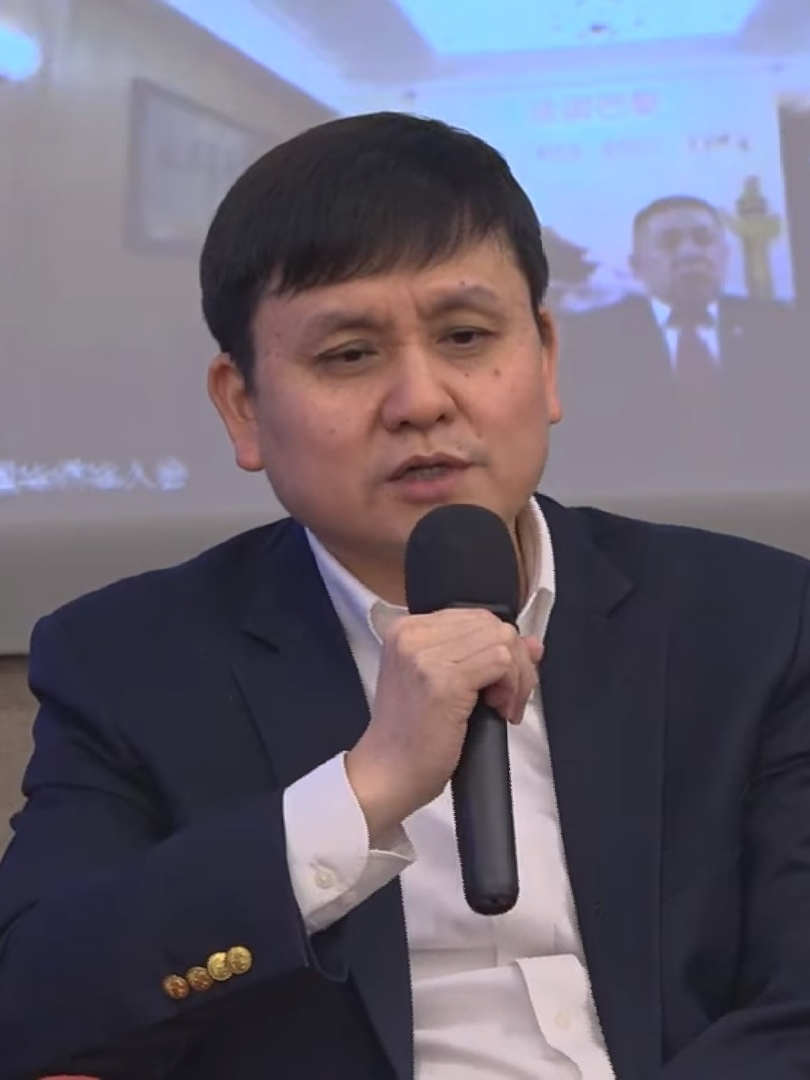
- Born: August 27, 1969 (age 57); Rui'an, Zhejiang, China
- Education: Shanghai Medical College (now under Fudan University)
- Scientific career
- Fields: pathogenesis, diagnosis and treatment of viral hepatitis, tuberculosis, bacterial infections and other infectious diseases
- Workplaces: Huashan Hospital

Chinese name
- Traditional Chinese: 張文宏
- Simplified Chinese: 张文宏
Transcriptions
Standard Mandarin
- Hanyu Pinyin: Zhāng Wénhóng

Zhang Wenhong (Chinese: 张文宏; born 27 August 1969) is a Chinese physician, and a member of the Chinese Communist Party. He is the director and party branch secretary of the Department of Infectious Diseases at Huashan Hospital affiliated to Fudan University, the director of the Internal Medicine Department of the Shanghai Medical College, and also the leader of the Shanghai Medical Treatment Experts Group, deputy director of the Shanghai Institute of Liver Diseases, and standing committee member of the Infectious Disease Branch of the Chinese Medical Association.

== Experience ==
Zhang graduated from Shanghai Medical University in 1993, majoring in medicine, and received his Ph.D. from Fudan University in 2000. His Ph.D. dissertation, titled "Study on the KatG Gene Mutations of Mycobacterium tuberculosis and its Relationship to Isoniazid Resistance", made the ground-breaking discovery that the "S315T mutation was related the INH resistance and R463L substitution does not significantly affect enzymatic activity of katG". He has studied at the BI Medical Center affiliated to Harvard Medical School and the Queen Mary Hospital affiliated to Hong Kong University.

== Related news ==
In a 2018 interview, Zhang said,"With the continuous updating of therapeutic drugs, hepatitis C can now be cured."

=== COVID-19 pandemic ===
Zhang is the leader of the Shanghai Medical Treatment Expert Group in the COVID-19 pandemic. He suggested that directors personally inspect rooms, instead of "pointing fingers behind others' backs"; changing positions, as "one cannot bully the obedient", "replace all doctors in all positions and replace them with departmental Communist Party members", and "no bargaining". The video went viral on Weibo and other social media, with netizens calling him a "hard-core director." Later, in an interview with the media, he said: "Everyone is a 'warrior' from now on. You are not isolated at home, you are fighting! Do you feel very bored? The virus will also be 'bored to death' (suffocated) by you. 'Bore' yourselves for two weeks"; "If the whole society is mobilized, 'boring' the virus is to contribute to society". Since then, he has put forward three important standards on returning to work, namely "fire prevention, anti-theft, and 'anti-colleagues'".

At the end of February, Zhang said in a media interview that in China, the first occurrence of COVID-19 was only in Wuhan. If it was transmitted to China from outside, it should have infected several Chinese cities at the same time, not one by one. He also said that the source of the virus is a controversial issue, but there must be "exact basis" to make claims, so he does not agree that the virus originated outside China. However, related reports have been removed from mainland China's news websites.

On March 15, Zhang posted on the official WeChat account of the Department of Infectious Diseases, Huashan Hospital, Fudan University. The post reads, "I originally believed that if China had properly controlled the situation, the world would also follow suit. East Asian countries such as Singapore, Japan, and South Korea did very well but Europe has now become the new epicenter of the epidemic, bringing us huge uncertainty. China will still face great import risks in the future. " He predicted, "With respect to the current global anti-epidemic measures, it is basically impossible for this epidemic to end this summer. If the epidemic continues to evolve in Italy and Iran, then the risk of COVID-19 becoming a cross-annual epidemic will increase along with it."

== Publications ==
- Prevention and Control of COVID-19 (张文宏教授支招防控新型冠状病毒) (Persian, English, Portuguese and Vietnamese translated version available)

== See also ==
- COVID-19 pandemic in mainland China
  - COVID-19 pandemic in Shanghai
