= Tang Yuhan =

Hong Kong-Chinese oncologist and businessman

- Born: 1913; Zhenhai, Ningbo, Zhejiang, China
- Died: May 25, 2014 (aged 100–101); Hong Kong
- Occupations: Physician, businessman
- Spouse: Chen Yunshang

Tang Yuhan, or Hans Tang (Chinese: 湯于翰; pinyin: Tāng Yúhàn; 1913 – 25 May 2014) was a Hong Kong-Chinese oncologist and businessman. He founded the Sino-Belgium Cancer Hospital of Radiation Therapy in Shanghai and served as president of the Hong Kong Chinese Medical Association (香港中華醫學會) and the founder of Tang Fund (湯氏基金).

== Life ==
=== Early life ===
Tang was born in Zhenhai, Zhejiang, China. He entered elementary school in Ningbo, and spent part of his childhood in Shanghai. He obtained his first M.D. from Shanghai Medical College (now the medical school of Fudan University). He then went to Western Europe and continued his study in medicine, especially in cancer therapy. He obtained his second doctor's degree from the Catholic University of Leuven in Belgium. He subsequently returned to Shanghai and served as president of the Sino-Belgian Radium Institute, the first cancer specialty hospital in China, and president of the Chinese Red Cross General Hospital.

=== 1950s ===
Tang went to Hong Kong as a doctor and businessman. He cooperated with Henry Fok in a series of investments. During this period, he became the member of Royal College of Physicians of London and Royal College of Physicians of Edinburgh and was selected to be the president of Hong Kong Chinese Medical Association (香港中華醫學會).

=== 1990s and later ===
Tang visited mainland China many times. As a member of Ningbo Group (寧波幫), he made contributions to Chinese education. A hospital affiliated to Ningbo University in Ningbo is named after him. He donated more than 10 million yuan RMB for this hospital, which was opened in 2005. To honor his donations, the Ningbo Government awarded him Honorary Citizenship of Ningbo in 1998 and the Zhejiang Government awarded him the honorary title of "Loving-Homeland Model" (愛鄉楷模) in 2000.

== Personal life ==
Tang's wife, Chen Yunshang, was an actress during the 1940s in Hong Kong and Shanghai. They married in 1943. Tang was a vegetarian and spoke several European languages.

== Memberships and other roles ==
- Member, Royal College of Physicians of London
- Member, Royal College of Physicians of Edinburgh
- Member, Hong Kong College of Physicians
- Member, Hong Kong Academy of Medicine
- Member, FHKAM (Medicine)
- Member and former president of Hong Kong Chinese Association of Medicine
- Honorary director of the Medical School, Ningbo University
