= COVID-19 pandemic in Beijing =

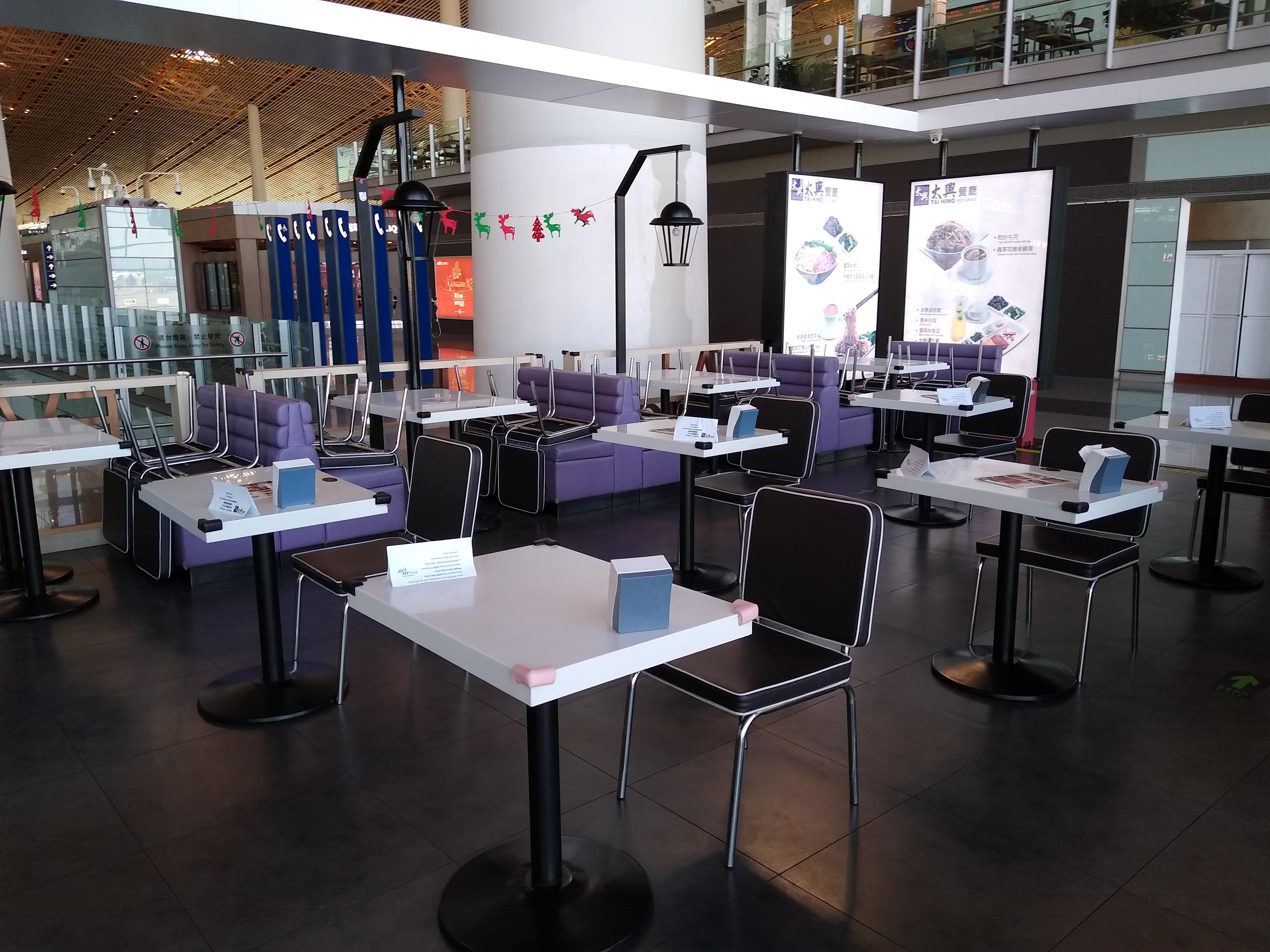
- Tables arranged for social distancing at Beijing Capital International Airport in March 2020
- Disease: COVID-19
- Pathogen: SARS-CoV-2
- Location: Beijing, China
- First outbreak: Wuhan, Hubei
- Index case: Daxing District
- Arrival date: 20 January 2020 (6 years, 10 months and 2 days ago)
- Confirmed cases: 935
- Recovered: 926
- Deaths: 9

The COVID-19 pandemic in Beijing is part of the worldwide pandemic of the coronavirus disease 2019 (COVID-19), caused by the severe acute respiratory syndrome coronavirus 2 (SARS-CoV-2). The disease first reached Beijing on 20 January 2020.

== Timeline ==
=== 2020 ===
==== 20 January–31 ====
On 20 January 2020, the Daxing District Health Committee informed people that two patients with fever had been diagnosed with the new coronavirus. They had visited Wuhan and had been isolated and treated without respiratory symptoms. This was the first reported case found in Beijing.

On 21 January, the Beijing Municipal Health Commission issued an announcement saying that Beijing had added five new cases of coronavirus pneumonia. Among the five people, three were men and two were women. The oldest was 56 years old, and the youngest was 18 years old. They all have travel histories in Wuhan. As of 18:00 on 21 January, a total of 10 confirmed cases were reported in Beijing.

On 22 January, the Beijing Municipal Committee of the Chinese Communist Party and the Beijing Municipal Government decided to establish a leading group for the prevention and control of the new coronavirus infection pneumonia with medical security. Seven groups were established, including transportation guarantee, commodity supply, service guarantee for major events, public opinion response, social stability, and college work. On the same day, four new cases were reported, and 14 cases were accumulated.

On 23 January, the Palace Museum announced that it would be closed from 25 January to prevent and control the epidemic. At the same time, many museums and art museums closed, including the National Museum of China, the National Library of China, Prince Gong's Mansion, and the National Art Museum of China, and the Beijing Miaohui was cancelled.

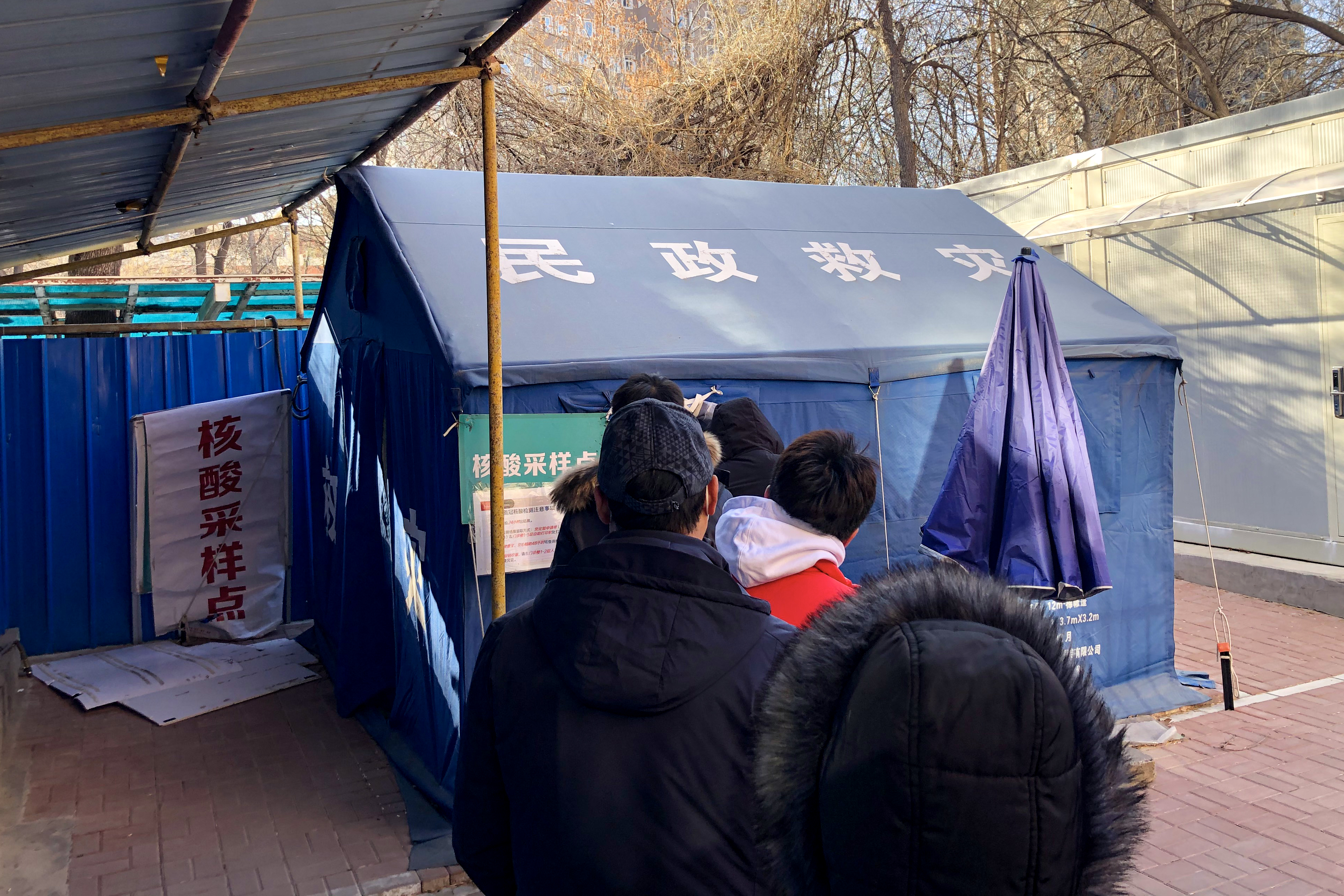
People wait in line to receive coronavirus tests outside Haidian Hospital, January 2021

In the early morning of 24 January, the Beijing Municipal Health Commission informed that from 14:00 to 24:00 on 23 January, there were four new cases of pneumonia caused by a new coronavirus infection in Beijing, all of whom were male and aged from 21 to 65 years old. They had a history of contact with Hubei. On the afternoon of the same day, Beijing re-informed three newly confirmed cases. A woman living in Daxing District recovered and was discharged on the same day. On the same day, between 5 p.m. and 8 p.m., the Beijing Municipal Health Commission notified five newly confirmed cases and two suspected cases.

On 25 January, a male patient living in Daxing District recovered and was discharged, becoming the second discharged patient in Beijing. On the afternoon of the same day, the Beijing Municipal Health Commission notified five newly confirmed cases, two of which had no history of contact with Hubei.

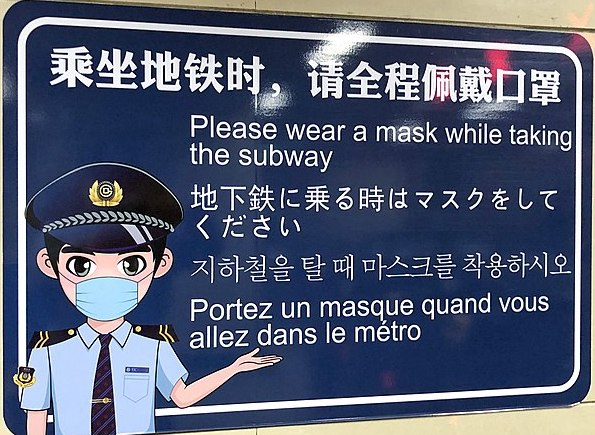
A sign at Dongzhimen station advising readers to wear a mask while riding the subway.

Starting on 26 January, all inter-provincial passenger transport and inter-provincial tour chartered vehicles entering and leaving Beijing were suspended; Beijing's universities, middle schools, primary schools, and kindergartens were delayed; offline training by off-campus training institutions was suspended; and the Beijing Film Academy examination was postponed. On the same day, the Beijing Municipal Health Commission notified 10 newly confirmed cases. In addition, the Beijing Municipal Health Commission also notified people that three doctors had been infected, two of whom had been to Wuhan on business. They received isolation treatment.

In the early morning of 27 January, the Beijing Municipal Health Commission notified that there were five new cases of pneumonia infected by the new coronavirus in Beijing from 18:00 to 21:00 on 26 January. One of the cases involved a 9-month-old baby girl who became ill on 25 January and went to see a doctor on 26 January. She had contact history in Hubei before. At 3 p.m. on the same day, the Beijing Municipal Health Commission reported that from 21:00 on the 26th to 9:00 on 27 January, Beijing had four new cases of pneumonia infected with the new coronavirus, of which one was a close contact of the previously confirmed case. As of 9:00 on 27 January, Beijing had reported a total of 72 confirmed cases, including 1 in Dongcheng District, 7 in Xicheng District, 11 in Chaoyang District, 17 in Haidian District, 4 in Fengtai District, 2 in Shijingshan, 6 in Tongzhou District, 1 in Shunyi District, 5 in Daxing District, 7 in Changping District, and 11 in Beijing from other places. That night, the Beijing Municipal Health Commission notified the details of the first death. The deceased was 50 years old. He went to Wuhan on 8 January. After returning to Beijing on 15 January, he developed a fever and sought medical attention on 21 January. He was diagnosed with a new coronavirus infection on 22 January, and his condition deteriorated. Due to respiratory failure, he died on 27 January due to ineffective rescue efforts. According to media reports, the dead patient was Yang Jun, a former vice president of Trina Solar, executive president of China Commercial Value Group, and employee of the project development department of Shanghai Electric's design company.

On the morning of 28 January, the Beijing Municipal Health Commission notified eight new cases of pneumonia infected by the new coronavirus, of which one was a close contact of the previously confirmed case. In the afternoon of the same day, 11 new cases of pneumonia infected by the new coronavirus were notified, of which 5 cases had contact histories in Hubei and 7 cases were close contacts of previously confirmed cases. As of 12:00 on 28 January, Beijing had a total of 91 confirmed cases. Among them, 2 cases were in Dongcheng District, 8 cases in Xicheng District, 17 cases in Chaoyang District, 21 cases in Haidian District, 7 cases in Fengtai District, 2 cases in Shijingshan District, 7 cases in Tongzhou District, 2 cases in Shunyi District, 7 cases in Daxing District, and 7 cases in Changping District, as well as 11 cases of foreigners who came to Beijing. On the same day, two patients with pneumonia infected by the novel coronavirus who were treated at the Fifth Medical Center of the PLA General Hospital in Beijing recovered and were discharged. The high school affiliated with Renmin University of China issued a statement saying that the parents of the third-year high school students were infected with the new type of coronavirus pneumonia and died after treatment.

On 29 January, the Beijing Municipal Health Commission notified 11 new cases of pneumonia caused by the new coronavirus, of which 7 had contact histories in Hubei and other provinces, 7 were close contacts of confirmed cases, and one had not yet completed the epidemic. According to the scientific investigation, four cases involved close contacts with both a history of contact in Hubei and confirmed cases. There were six males and five females, ages 2 to 80. On the evening of the same day, Beijing added nine new cases of pneumonia caused by the new coronavirus, of which seven had contact histories in Hubei and other provinces; two were close contacts of confirmed cases; six were males; and three were females. The age range was 25–80 years. In the afternoon, Pang Xinghuo, deputy director of the Beijing Municipal Center for Disease Control and Prevention, stated at a press conference that the epidemic in Beijing is in the transitional stage from the import period to the spread period.

On 30 January, the Beijing Municipal Health Commission notified three new cases of pneumonia caused by the novel coronavirus, two of which had contact history in Hubei and other provinces; one was a close contact of the confirmed case; two were men; and one was a woman. The age range was 21–73 years old. In the afternoon of the same day, Wang Guangfa, director of the Department of Respiratory and Critical Care Medicine at Peking University First Hospital, was discharged from Ditan Hospital.

On 31 January, the Beijing Municipal Health Commission notified seven new cases of pneumonia caused by the new coronavirus, from 8:00 a.m. to 20:00 p.m. on 30 January, of which two cases had contact histories in Hubei and other provinces, and five cases were close to being confirmed cases. Contact was made; another case was discharged. On the same day, it was notified that 11 new cases of pneumonia infected by the new coronavirus were reported from 20:00 to 24:00 on 30 January. Among them, 7 had contact histories in Hubei and other provinces, 5 were close contacts of confirmed cases, and 1 of them had existing Hubei. The contact history is also a close contact of the confirmed case; seven new coronavirus-infected pneumonia cases were added from 24:00 on the 30th to 14:00 on 31 January, of which six cases have contact histories in Hubei and other provinces and five cases are close contacts of confirmed cases. Among the contacts, four cases had contact histories in Hubei and other provinces and were close contacts of confirmed cases.

==== June ====
Although China managed to flatten the curve, there was a concern that another second wave of coronavirus would wreak havoc in Beijing and lead to a new lockdown. There was a spike of 137 new local cases in a few days in mid-June 2020. Nonetheless, the number of deaths from COVID-19 was still rather low, at only nine victims.

=== 2022 ===
==== April ====
There were reports of panic buying by residents to stock up supplies on 24 April 2022 due to a new Omicron variant outbreak in the city. As a response to the outbreak, authorities ordered three rounds of mass testing on all of its residents to avoid another citywide lockdown similar to Shanghai. On 29 April, Beijing closed all schools, with students making up more than 30% of the 150 total cases since the start of the wave two weeks prior.

==== May ====
On 3 May, Beijing reopened their isolation facility.

== See also ==
- COVID-19 pandemic in mainland China
- COVID-19 pandemic in Shanghai
