= Mulan Joins the Army (1939 film) =

- Traditional Chinese: 木蘭從軍
- Simplified Chinese: 木兰从军
- Hanyu Pinyin: Mùlán cóng jūn
- Directed by: Bu Wancang
- Written by: Ouyang Yuqian
- Produced by: Zhang Shankun
- Starring: Chen Yunshang
- Cinematography: Yu Xingsan
- Edited by: Chen Yiqing
- Music by: Yan Gongshang
- Production company: Hwa Cheng Studio
- Distributed by: United Motion Picture Corporation Inc.
- Release date: February 16, 1939 (China)
- Running time: 89 minutes
- Country: China
- Language: Mandarin

Mulan Joins the Army (simplified Chinese: 木兰从军; traditional Chinese: 木蘭從軍; pinyin: Mùlán cóngjūn) is a 1939 Chinese historical war film and is one of several film adaptations of the Hua Mulan (花木兰) legend, a story of a young woman who disguises herself as a man in order to take her father's place in the army. Described as a musical comedy, the film was directed by Richard Poh (Bu Wancang) and stars Nancy Chan (credited as Chen Yunshang) as the title character. The success of the movie was evident by its record-breaking run of 83 days in Shanghai. The screenplay by Ouyang Yuqian, was produced in Shanghai by the Hwa Cheng Studio (華成製片廠), a subsidiary of the Xinhua Film Company.

== Plot ==
Hua Mulan, the heroine, is a young maiden who lives with her elderly father during the Tang Dynasty. Mulan is a mischievous girl who is also skilled in martial arts and archery as her father has raised her. After a day of hunting, she tricks some village people from the Li village into letting her go after setting up a ruse for an impossible archery challenge. Upon returning, she learns that her father has been conscripted for the war effort and decides to go in his stead.

On the day of departure, Mulan is followed by two conscripts who take an interest in her. They question her designation and origin among other things before another conscript intervenes but Mulan puts an end to it with a show of humiliation. She stops at an inn and coincidentally sees the latter conscript who introduces himself as Yuandu Liu.

For the next three years, Mulan and Yuandu work together to protect the border from the barbarian army. Yuandu reports to Mulan of a secret assault but says the commander is in denial after becoming complacent leading him to underestimate the enemy. Mulan and Yuandu manage to get approval of a reconnaissance mission to prove the assault. Yuandu and Mulan split up, having disguised a barbarian hunter and women respectively, to find the location of the army. Mulan is eventually stopped by two barbarian guards who she deceives into disclosing their army numbers. After acquiring further proof by dispatching a barbarian messenger she returns and reports directly to the Marshal her findings. The commander, who has been bribed by the enemy generals, refutes her claims saying it is all a decoy. Frustrated and persistent, Mulan continues to make preparations in secret and on the day of the attack, they manage to strategically reclaim their city as the commander is found guilty of being a traitor and is executed.

Returning to the Imperial capital, Mulan is offered a position in the Emperor's court. She turns the position down, asking only to return to her home. Returning to her feminine persona, she then marries Yuandu. After her heroic achievements and brave service to the State, Mulan finally reveals her life as a woman while Liu symbolically restores the conventional male role.

== Production and cast members ==
- Director: Richard Poh (Bu Wancang)
- Screenplay: E. C. Ouyang (Ouyang Yuqian)
- Producer: Zhang Shankun
- Studio: Huacheng
- Release Date: 16 February 1939
- Duration: 89 minutes

=== Cast ===
- Nancy Chan (Chen Yunshang (陈云裳)) as Hua Mulan (花木兰), the film's heroine
- Mai Hsi (Mei Xi) as Liu Yuandu (劉元度), Mulan's fellow general and eventual love interest.
- L. K. Han (Han Langen (韩兰根)) as one of the two draftees
- S. C. Ying (Yin Xiucen (殷秀岑)) as the second draftee
- C. C. Liu (Liu Jiqun (刘继群)) as Liu Ying (劉英)
- C. Z. Chong (Zhang Zhizhi (章志直)) as one of the soldier comrades
- N. S. Wong (Huang Naishuang (黄耐霜)) as Mulan's sister
- J. Tom (Tang Jie (汤杰)) as the Military Commander
- C. L. Hong (Hong Jingling (洪警铃)) as barbarian soldiers
- Yan Yan (严岩) as the Hunter
- He Jianfei (何剑飞) as Mulan's Father
- Wang Di (王蒂) as Mulan's Mother
- Jiang Xiou (姜修) as the Emperor
- Ye Xiaozhu (叶小珠) as Mulan's Brother
- Fu Weilian (傅威廉) as the Marshal

== History of the tale of Mulan ==
The story of Mulan first made its appearance in China as an ancient Chinese folk ballad. The story about Mulan, a warrior maiden who battled while dressed as a male soldier and shone, was retold for hundreds of years. The earliest written account of Mulan was in the Northern and Southern Dynasties (years 386–589), in a narrative poem called "Mulan Ci". It was written in the Northern Wei Dynasties, but also included in the Ancient and Modern Music Records of Chen in the Southern Dynasty. Mulan's story has continued to resonate with audiences through the centuries and has been a recurring theme in traditional Beijing opera performances. There are specific parts of the story that are present in its many retellings: a young woman takes the place of her elderly father in war, disguises as a man, serves her country, and returns home with honor and glory to resume her life as a woman. The film “Mulan Joins the Army” has been the subject of extensive historical discourse due to its contentious nature. To secure distribution in areas under Japanese control, the producer negotiated with Japanese authorities. These dealings subsequently fueled allegations that Japanese funding was involved when the film debuted in Chongqing. Nonetheless, the production took place in Shanghai, where it navigated the censorship thresholds of the Shanghai Municipal Council. By blending elements of national resistance with comedic and entertaining undertones, the film managed to cater to the unique tastes of the ‘Solitary Island’ audience while adhering to the expectations of the Shanghai Municipal Council. The story had previously been adapted as two silent films: Hua Mulan Joins the Army (1927) by Tianyi Film Company, and a less successful Mulan Joins the Army (1928) produced by China Sun Motion Picture Company. The 1939 film was also part of a broader wartime Chinese-language film culture. During the Second Sino-Japanese War, Chinese-language films continued to be produced in several regions, including Shanghai, Chongqing, Hong Kong, Singapore, and Manchukuo. Shanghai remained especially active: between 1938 and 1941, studios in the city released 230 feature films, and six new cinemas opened in the Shanghai concessions in 1939. Some people in the film industry referred to 1939 as the "year of cinema".

== Production ==
After the Japanese invasion in 1937, film production in Shanghai in the late 1930s was quite difficult, with most of the established talent fleeing to Hong Kong and the interior. One of the remaining production companies, the Xinhua Film Company, hoped to make Shanghai the “Hollywood of the East,” with the release of the costume epic Diao Chan, directed by Bu Wancang. Mulan Joins the Army was produced by Hwa Cheng Studio, which had developed from Xinhua Film Company. Hwa Cheng released twenty-four films in 1939, including Mulan Joins the Army. The film was a huge success, one that Xinhua’s chief Zhang Shankun wished to replicate with a second costume epic.

This film should be addressed with wartime of Shanghai, instead of only a war film that illustrate an ancient historical epic. Considering that this film was produced during Second Sino-Japanese War, Mulan Joins the Army used a well-known heroic figure, encouraged audiences' concern about the contemporary foreign invasion.

Nearly all of Shanghai's big stars such as Jin Yan or Zhao Dan had fled to Chongqing by 1939. Zhang attempted to recruit Hu Die in Hong Kong for his studio's newest venture but failed. While in Hong Kong, however, he managed to sign with the playwright Ouyang Yuqian to pen his film, and Cantonese actress Chen Yunshang to star. Before starring in Mulan Joins the Army, Chen had appeared in more than a dozen Cantonese-language productions and was already known to audiences in South China. Their involvement reflected the movement of film talent between Hong Kong and Shanghai during the wartime period. Zhang very much focused on making the actress a fresh face for Shanghai, and publicity for Chen began before the studio even saw the script.

Ouyang’s original inspiration for the script was drawn from the traditional interpretations of the legend of Hua Mulan, where she takes her own life, as well as his previous works that centred around tragic and oppressed women. Initially, he wanted Mulan to be portrayed as the tragic female heroine “who opposed feudalism". Still, he ultimately infused the film with subtle nationalist undertones and romance, choosing a more uplifting and patriotic approach to raise audience’s spirits in light of the ongoing Second Sino-Japanese War. According to Ouyang, he added plot details based on his research into records from the Ming and Qing dynasty regarding stories of Mulan. Impressed with the script, Zhang and Xinhua invested heavily in both production and publicity of the film. To promote Chen Yunshang, the actress who portrayed Mulan, the studio drew an image of her as a Westernized persona in real life and on-screen. Due to Bu Wancang’s vision of adding gimmicks into the film, Ouyang’s initial intentions were never fully conveyed by the film, and his original script was never released to the public. However, his final script was published a month after the release of the film, and was used by some Chinese travelling theater troupes as wartime propaganda to encourage the masses to take action.

== Release ==
Mulan Joins the Army was made during the Second Sino-Japanese War and the so-called Solitary Island period, when the city's foreign concessions remained outside direct Japanese occupation while much of Chinese-administered Shanghai had fallen after 1937. Given the film's subtle patriotism, it proved extremely popular with domestic audiences. Premiering in Shanghai's newest theater, the Astor in February 1939, in time for the Chinese New Year, Mulan Joins the Army ended up being a critical success. It was moreover, a major commercial success, playing to full theaters in Shanghai and remained on-screen for 83 consecutive days. The success even made its lead, Chen Yunshang, into a bona fide star, with Hwa Cheng studio quickly capitalizing on her newfound fame by casting her in two additional musicals. Not only that, but before the release of this film, the movie industry during the isolated island period was rather sluggish. The release of "Mulan Joins the Army" pointed a direction for producers of the time. In the following two years, the emergence of many similar films provided spiritual solace to the people of Shanghai.

When the Xinhua Film Company’s Mulan Joins the Army was first screened at the Only Cinema in Chongqing in 1940, it faced audience opposition due to the film's perceived relationship with the ongoing Second Sino-Japanese War. During the premiere, numerous attendees took to the stage to express their dissent through speeches. They argued that the film’s recurring motif, introduced in three separate interludes with the phrase “When the sun rises, it shines over the whole world,” was a veiled reference to Japan. The situation escalated into a protest against the screening. On the second day of the incident, the National Government's Central Telegraphic Inspection Committee's spokesperson released a written statement stating that the film did not go against the Committee's regulations and that it did not go against anti-Japanese resistance as was alleged and criticized. There were, however, opposing views to this. Ma Yanxiang, a dramatist, and director had watched a small-scale trial screening of Mulan Joins the Army. He and his mentor tried to publicly call for the cancellation of the screening of the film, but their request was rejected by the local newspaper agency.

The Chongqing riot incident marked an unprecedented moment in Chinese film history, being the first time a local Chinese film incited a riot with audiences. Furthermore, the film was declared banned despite it already having previously been cleared by the government censors and shown to the public. Following the incident, the film had to be re-submitted to the CFCC for another review and was then re-released a few months later.

Today, the film is seen as an obvious appeal to the Shanghai audience's own wartime sensibilities. The weak Chinese generals and the outside nomad invaders all would have reminded the audience of the country's woes at that time, namely the corrupt warlords within the Nationalist establishment and the outbreak of the Second Sino-Japanese War. As one scholar posits, the film was seen as a call to arms, with the Chinese hero (or in this case, heroine) rising up to defeat foreign attackers striking a particularly resonant chord. The director used various cinematic techniques and angles to implore the public to reflect on the current political situation, drawing the parallel with reality at the time. Real-life political figures, such as Chiang Kai-Shek and Wang Jingwei (Wang Ching-wei), inspired the portrayal of some characters in the movie.

== Wartime significance ==
Produced during the Second Sino-Japanese War, Mulan Joins the Army used the familiar Mulan legend to address contemporary concerns about patriotism, national resistance, and gendered service to the nation. Its historical setting allowed the film to present wartime themes indirectly while also remaining commercially appealing to Shanghai audiences. The film is also significant as an example of Republican-era wartime popular culture, combining a historical legend, musical comedy, gender disguise, and patriotic allegory for audiences in wartime Shanghai.

== Themes ==
Themes of warfare and feminism can be identified throughout the movie. In 1939, the movie premiered in theaters, and China was suffering from the Second Sino-Japanese War. This film significantly glorified warfare and focused on the fame and recognition of soldiers received from serving the nation. The movie is a blend of modern and urban thoughts along with traditional cultural ideas. When China citizens needed the motivation to defend the nation from foreign aggression, the film helped inspire Chinese people to enlist and liberate their country from Japanese occupation. Mulan Joins the Army was rich in "double entendre" dialogue and was one of the primary tools to convey the political message. The author underlines the idea of a citizen's duty, not only to one's family but to the country as a whole, by describing Mulan's life after her heroic acts. During the isolated island period in Shanghai, the release of Mulan was a huge hit. This was because citizens were oppressed and Mulan's acts inspired patriotic thoughts in people's minds.

During the male dominated time period in China, women were supposed to raise children, do housework and rarely involved themselves in politics. Mulan brought on the idea of women challenging the traditional, social and sexual orders. The ambiguity of modern women brought out different ideas in many aspects like culture, class, generation, and ethnicity. However, these female models shown through big screens inspired women to step up in those areas and begin to show their political potential. When most of the men in China enlisted in the army to defeat the Japanese, women started to step into the workforce to sustain the economy. With the political allegory, the director describes an issue that is mentioned multiple times in the movie: Chinese men are not able to protect their motherland. Also from the 1920s and 1930s, the concept of "New Woman" emerged in the media. The image of "modern Mulans" had sparked off debates over gender, modernity, and the changing relationships in early 20th century China. Bu Wancang also brings up the topic of hetero and homosexuality of the "mischievous tomboy" character despite the conservative views of the public. The theme of New Woman encouraged the aspirations of women to pursue equal education, employment, and political representation as men.

== Culture and influence ==
Mulan Joins the Army emerged not just as wartime entertainment but as a cultural emblem during the Second Sino-Japanese War. The film presented Hua Mulan as a gender-defying patriot, a woman who subverts traditional roles to serve her nation. Scholarly analysis finds that this adaptation reflects a broader shift in gender narratives: the film transitions from patriarchal storytelling to a portrayal of feminine self-awakening and gender equity in cinematic context.

Beyond gender, Mulan Joins the Army acts as a cultural palimpsest, layering diverse symbolic values over the Mulan legend. Critics argue it unites elements of loyal filial piety, national resistance, chastity, and proto-feminist symbolism, weaving together strands of China’s complex ideological heritage. It resonates with audiences of "isolated island" Shanghai by offering both escapism and patriotic affirmation.

Consequently, the film reinforced the “New Woman” archetype and cemented its regional and transnational legacy. Its construction of Mulan as a loyal soldier and filial daughter, presaged later portrayals in Chinese opera film, mid-century television adaptations, and even Western productions like Disney's Mulan.

=== Modern media significance ===
Mulan Joins the Army (1939) is considered the earliest surviving sound film adaptation of the Mulan legend and has played a significant role in shaping subsequent representations of the character in both Chinese and international media. The film established key narrative elements, such as Mulan disguising herself as a man, demonstrating military prowess, and fulfilling filial duty that have remained central to later adaptations. Its influence can be seen in mid-20th century Chinese operatic films and television portrayals, as well as in animated and live-action productions outside of China, most notably Disney's Mulan (1998) and Mulan (2020) remake. While later versions reinterpret the legend within different cultural frameworks, they retain core themes popularized by the 1939 film, including patriotism, gender identity, and personal sacrifice

== Relevant art movements ==
The film draws on the legacy of the May Fourth Movement, particularly in its feminist reinterpretation of the Mulan legend and its use of leftist melodrama to convey nationalistic and social themes. The name Mulan is connected with idiomatic expressions such as “替父从军” (tì fù cóng jūn) and “代父从军” (dài fù cóng jūn, ‘join the army in one’s father’s place’) emphasising both filial duty and gender subversion. Produced during the Second Sino-Japanese War, during an afternoon screening, a man took the stage and condemned the filmmakers as traitors. The left-wing screenwriter Xia Yan later criticized the film and its producer Zhang Shankun because of the film's perceived relationship with Japanese-occupied Shanghai. The film’s depiction of Mulan as a courageous and autonomous heroine aligns with the contemporary discourse on the “New Woman” (新女性), a symbol of modernity and female empowerment in Republican-era China.

== Analysis ==
In the film, Mulan is depicted as the epitome of Confucian virtues, embodying the roles of a filial daughter and a virtuous soldier, willing to sacrifice her life rather than compromise her identity and dishonor her family. Her character also symbolizes the readiness of women to confront adversaries in war, showcasing female resilience and might. Mulan is portrayed as a person of profound familial and patriotic obligation, maintaining her integrity as she carves out her place in battle and prevails against formidable challenges. She stands as a testament to the victories of a zealous warrior, personifying the ideal “national” forms.

Contrastingly, the film presents Mulan as a rugged, autonomous individual who challenges traditional gender expectations by engaging in hunting and shunning the expected domestic task of weaving. This reimagined character champions the evolving societal roles of women, resonating with the contemporary nationalist movement. While the narrative preserves the strong bond between father and daughter, it introduces a dynamic of conflict, casting the father as a proponent of traditional moral principles and Mulan as a progressive force, ultimately striving for personal fulfillment that transcends mere filial devotion.

Among the many ways in which Chinese dramatists sought to galvanize the support of the people to fight against the invading Japanese, perhaps none was more effective and appealing than the cultivation and exaltation of female resistance symbols. In the film, instead of the conventional representation of women, Bu Wancang portrays Mulan as a courageous warrior who is more masculine than any of her comrades as masculinity is defined by courage, loyalty and fearlessness in battle. In a country's time of need, it is only Hua Mulan who does what is right and saves them all. Her behavior throughout the film is seen as exceptional as she stands out and outperforms the rest of the actual men. This was already seen in the opening hunting scene where Mulan strikes a male hunter with her arrow and tells him she mistook him for a rabbit. This scene presented Mulan's masculinity over the other male hunters who have hunted down no animals in contrast to Mulan who has quite a haul as well as the emasculation of the male hunter she struck by comparing him to a rabbit which is slang for a homosexual man. This also demonstrated her superior skills as well as wisdom and brains as she manages to escape their humiliation in the end. She has proved her potential and ability to accomplish great things with the right motives to the men.

== Availability ==
The film is available with English subtitles through the Chinese Film Classics project.
