= Eye and ENT Hospital of Fudan University =

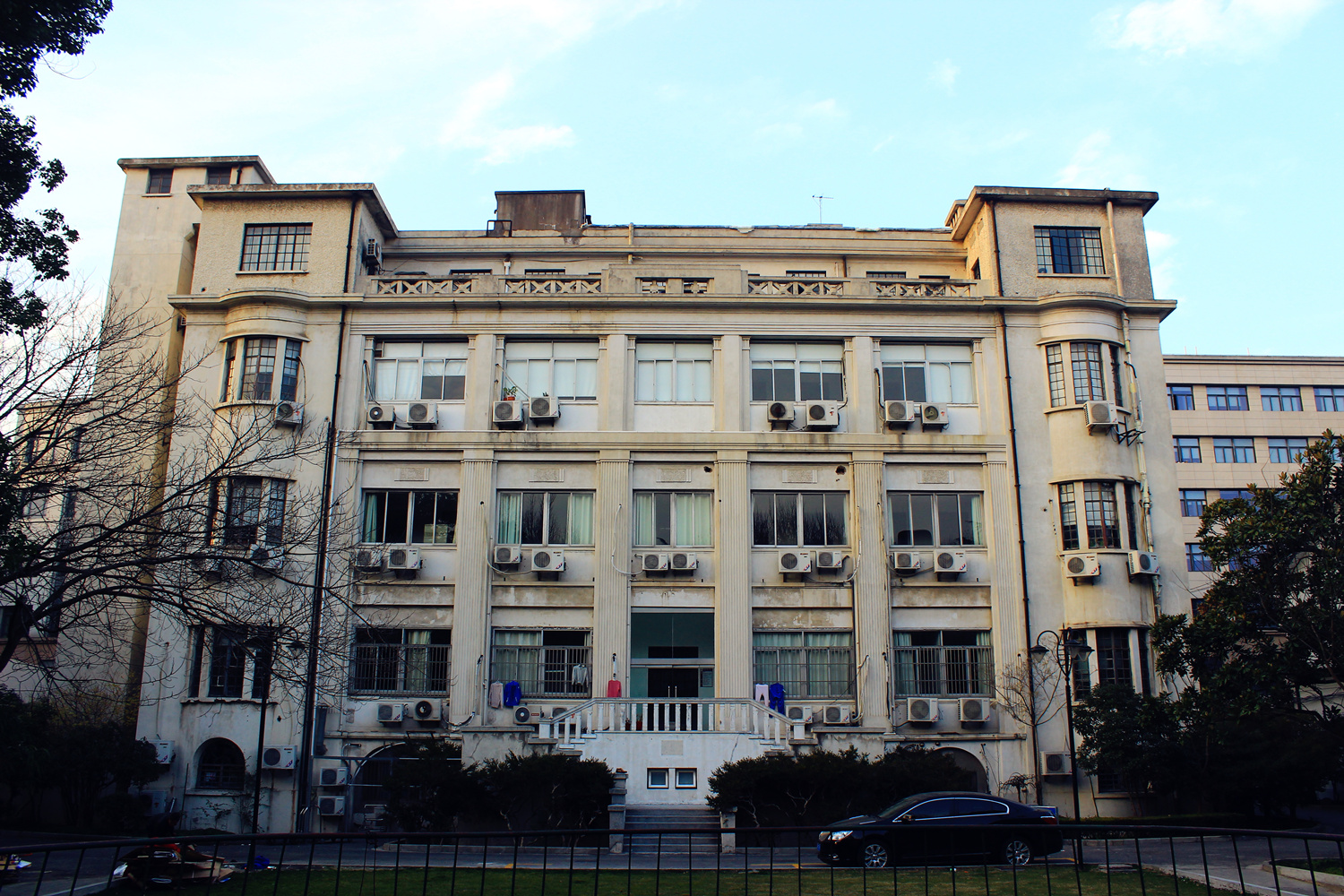
- The Jewish Hospital Building, constructed in 1942

Geography
- Location: Xuhui, Pudong, and Pujiang, Shanghai, China

Organisation
- Type: Teaching
- Affiliated university: Shanghai Medical College of Fudan University

Services
- Beds: 374 (main branch), 350 (Pujiang campus)
- Speciality: Ophthalmology and Otorhinolaryngology

History
- Founded: 1934 (B'nai B'rith Polyclinic); 1943 (Shanghai Jewish Hospital); 1952 (Eye and ENT Hospital)

Links
- Website: www.fdeent.org
- Lists: Hospitals in China

Chinese name
- Simplified Chinese: 复旦大学附属眼耳鼻喉科医院
- Traditional Chinese: 復旦大學附屬眼耳鼻喉科醫院
Transcriptions
Standard Mandarin
- Hanyu Pinyin: Fùdàn Dàxué fùshǔ yǎn ěrbí hóu kē yīyuàn

The Eye, Ear, Nose and Throat (Eye and ENT) Hospital of Fudan University (Chinese: 复旦大学附属眼耳鼻喉科医院), formerly the Shanghai Jewish Hospital (also B'nai B'rith Foundation Polyclinic), is a teaching hospital in Shanghai, China, affiliated with the Shanghai Medical College of Fudan University and the Red Cross Society of Shanghai. It is rated Grade 3, Class A, the highest rating in the Chinese medical system.

== Overview ==
There are 374 beds on the main Fenyang Road campus of the hospital, which comprises the departments of Ophthalmology, Otorhinolaryngology, Radiotherapy, Anesthesia, Emergency Medicine, Stomatology, Laser Therapy and Plastic Surgery.

The hospital has 1,112 employees. It treats 1.8 million outpatients and performs 90,000 surgeries per year, with patients coming from all over China. In addition to the main campus at Fenyang Road in Xuhui District, it has a second site on Baoqing Road, and two other campuses in Pudong and Minhang, respectively. The Minhang campus has an additional 350 beds.

== History ==
The hospital was founded in 1934 by the B'nai B'rith Shanghai Lodge with funds donated by the prominent Jewish businessman Elly Kadoorie. It was originally called the B'nai B'rith Foundation Polyclinic (Chinese: 上海圣裔社医院). In 1940, it opened a dispensary which provided free medicine to the indigent.

After the outbreak of the Pacific War, the Russian Jewish community in the city took over the clinic in 1942, moved it to the current site on Route Pichon (now Fenyang Road), and expanded it into a hospital. On 16 January 1943, the renamed Shanghai Jewish Hospital (Chinese: 上海犹太医院) was opened. At the time it had 60 beds and state-of-the-art equipment including the X-ray machine, and it provided treatment to the poor free of charge. I. K. Kagan served as chairman of the hospital, and S. Citrin, chairwoman of the ladies' committee, oversaw the house management and the kitchen.

After the founding of the People's Republic of China, the Eye, Ear, Nose and Throat (Eye and ENT) Hospital of the Shanghai Medical College was established in 1952 by professors Hu Maolian (胡懋廉) and Guo Bingkuan (郭秉宽) on the site of the Jewish Hospital. It adopted the current name in 2000, when the Shanghai Medical College was merged into Fudan University to become its medical school.

The hospital opened a second site on Baoqing Road in 2002, a Pudong campus in 2003, and a Pujiang, Minhang, campus in 2017.
