= Shanghai Cancer Center =

Geography
- Location: Shanghai, China

Organisation
- Type: Teaching
- Affiliated university: Shanghai Medical College of Fudan University

Services
- Beds: 1,100

History
- Founded: 1931

Links
- Website: www.shca.org.cn
- Lists: Hospitals in China

The Fudan University Shanghai Cancer Center (FUSCC, Chinese: 复旦大学附属肿瘤医院), also called the Shanghai Cancer Hospital (Chinese: 上海市肿瘤医院), is a teaching hospital affiliated with the Shanghai Medical College of Fudan University. Founded in 1931, it is the first cancer specialty hospital in China. It is rated Grade 3, Class A.

== Overview ==
In 2013, the hospital had 1,489 staff, including 1,298 medical professionals, 154 of whom are professors or associate professors. The president is Jiang Guoliang (蒋国梁), a fellow of the American College of Radiology. The hospital has 1,100 beds and treats more than 590,000 outpatients and 22,000 inpatients per year.

The hospital publishes two Chinese-language journals, the English Journal of Radiation Oncology, and the magazine Anti-Cancer (抗癌).

== History ==
The hospital was founded on 1 March 1931 as the Sino-Belgian Radium Institute (Chinese: 中比鐳錠治療院, French: Institut Sino-Belge du Radium), sited in the Sacred Heart Hospital of Shanghai (Chinese: 上海聖心醫院, now Yangpu Central Hospital). It was funded by a minor remittance of Boxer Indemnity paid by China to Belgian. It became an independent institute in 1936, and was renamed Shanghai Radium Institute (Chinese: 上海鐳錠治療院) after the Communists captured Shanghai in 1949. It was affiliated to the Shanghai First Medical College from 1954, and renamed the Cancer Hospital of SFMC.

== See also ==
- Tang Yuhan, former president of the Sino-Belgian Radium Institute
