= Chen Yunshang =

Chinese actress and singer (1919–2016)

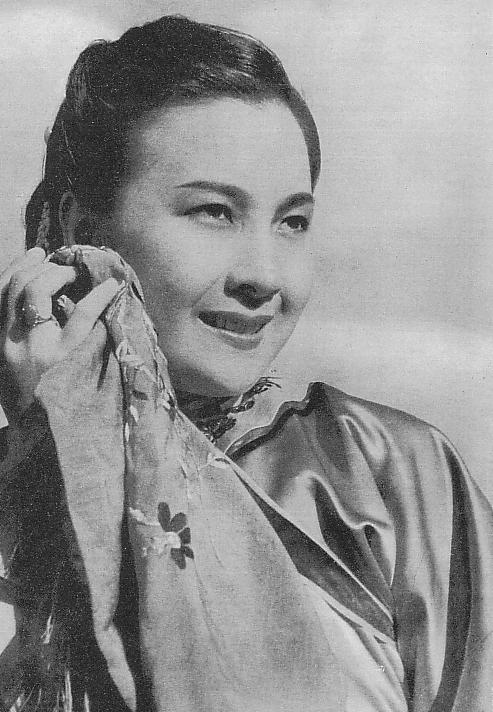
- Nancy Chan
- Born: 10 August 1919; Guangzhou
- Died: 29 June 2016 (aged 96)
- Other names: Nancy Chan, Chan Wan-Seung
- Occupation: Actress
- Spouse: Tang Yuhan

Chinese name
- Traditional Chinese: 陳雲裳
- Simplified Chinese: 陈云裳
Transcriptions
Standard Mandarin
- Hanyu Pinyin: Chén Yúnshang

Chen Yunshang (Chinese: 陳雲裳; pinyin: Chén Yúnshang; August 10, 1919 – June 29, 2016) was a Chinese film actress and singer of the 1930s and 1940s.

== Biography ==
Chen was born in Guangzhou but her family came from Taishan. She began her career in Hong Kong in 1935 but in 1939 moved to Shanghai to star in Mulan Joins the Army.

Chen married Tang Yuhan, a Shanghai doctor, in 1943. They subsequently moved to Hong Kong. She retired in 1952.

== Filmography ==
=== Films ===
This is a partial list of films.

- 1939 Mulan Joins the Army
- 1940 Bi yu zan
- 1942 Bo ai
- 1943 Eternity

== Gallery ==
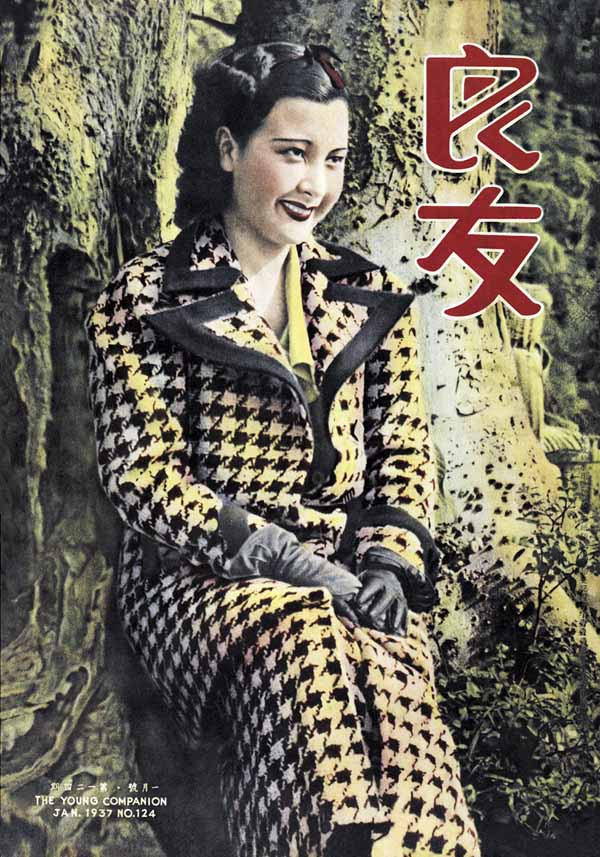
Chen on the cover of The Young Companion issue 124.

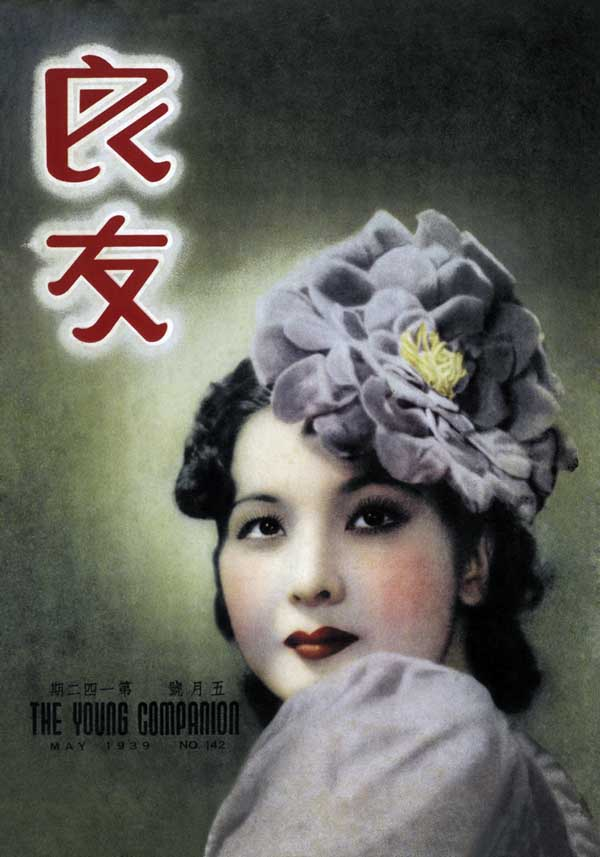
Chen on the cover of The Young Companion issue 142.

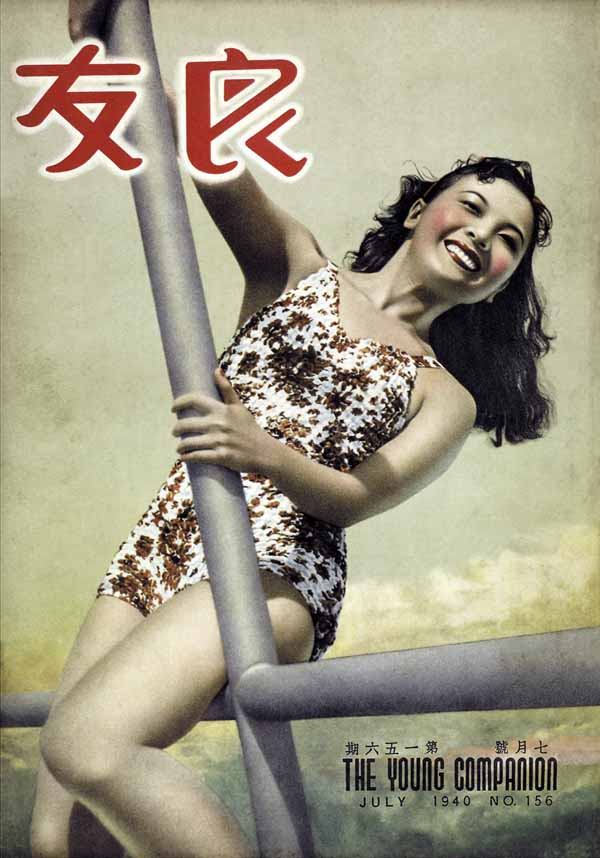
Chen on the cover of The Young Companion issue 156.

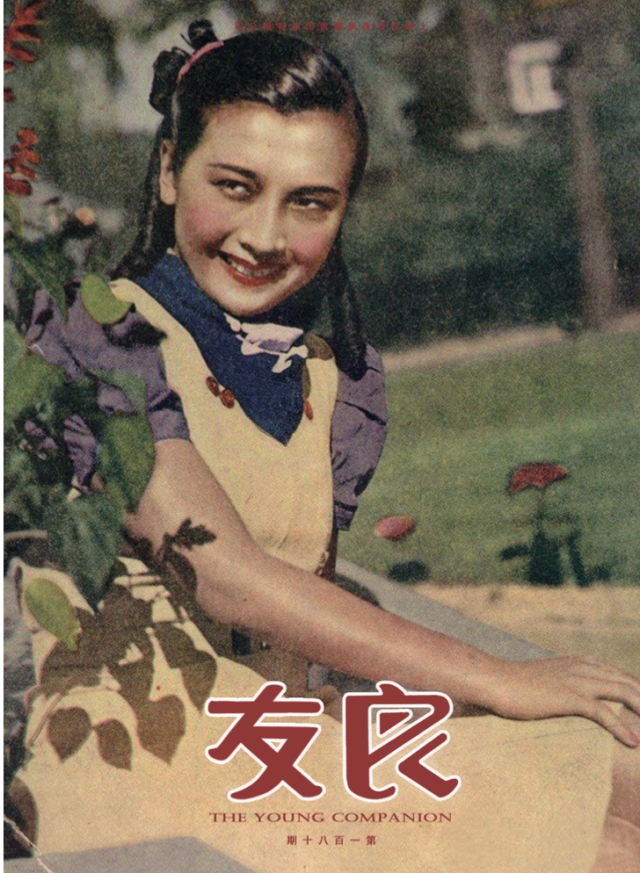
Chen on the cover of The Young Companion issue 180.
