= Shen Ziyin =

Chinese biologist, physician and medical researcher

- 沈自尹
- Born: March 22, 1928; Zhenhai, Zhejiang, China
- Died: March 7, 2019 (aged 90); Shanghai, China
- Education: Shanghai Medical College
- Scientific career
- Fields: Combination of Chinese and Western Medicine
- Workplaces: Huashan Hospital, Shanghai Medical College

Shen Ziyin (Chinese: 沈自尹; 22 March 1928 – 7 March 2019) was a Chinese biologist, physician, and medical researcher. He spent his entire career at Huashan Hospital, a teaching hospital of Shanghai Medical College of Fudan University. He was elected an academician of the Chinese Academy of Sciences in 1997.

== Biography ==
Shen was born on 22 March 1928 in Zhenhai, Zhejiang, Republic of China. After graduating from Shanghai Medical College (now part of Fudan University) in 1952, he worked in internal medicine at Huashan Hospital, which is affiliated with Shanghai Medical College. While he was trained in Western medicine in college, he began studying traditional Chinese medicine (TCM) in 1955 under the well-known doctor Jiang Chunhua (姜春华).

Shen spent his entire career at Huashan Hospital. He was a pioneer in using biomedical research to affirm the pathological bases of TCM concepts, and was an ardent proponent of TCM. One of his major research areas was the TCM concept of "kidney yang deficiency" (肾阳虚), which he linked to the malfunction of the hypothalamus. However, his research received mixed reaction from TCM practitioners, with some embracing his scientific authority, while others accused him of fragmenting and debasing Chinese medicine.

He published more than 100 scientific papers and six monographs. He received more than 20 major awards including the State Science and Technology Progress Award (Second Class), and trained more than 30 graduate students. He was elected an academician of the Chinese Academy of Sciences in 1997.

On 7 March 2019, Shen died at Huashan Hospital in Shanghai, at the age of 90.
