= Wen Yumei =

Chinese virologist and microbiologist

- 闻玉梅
- Born: January 16, 1934 (age 92); Beijing, China
- Education: Shanghai Medical College
- Scientific career
- Fields: Molecular biology
- Workplaces: Fudan University

Chinese name
- Traditional Chinese: 聞玉梅
- Simplified Chinese: 闻玉梅
Transcriptions
Standard Mandarin
- Hanyu Pinyin: Wén Yùméi

Wen Yumei (Chinese: 闻玉梅; born 16 January 1934) is a Chinese virologist and microbiologist and the current director of the Institute of Pathogenic Microorganisms, Fudan University. She is also the director of Scientific Committee of Open Laboratory of Medical Molecular Virology, Ministry of Education and Ministry of Health.

== Biography ==
Wen was born in Beijing on January 16, 1934, with her ancestral home is in Xishui County, Hubei Province. Her father Wen Yichuan (Chinese: 闻亦传; 1896-1939) was an alumnus of the University of Chicago and medical scientist. Her mother Gui Zhiliang (Chinese: 桂质良) graduated from St. Mary's Hall, Wellesley Women's University and Johns Hopkins University. Her uncle Wen Yiduo was a well-known poet and scholar. She has an elder sister.

In 1941 she attended the Shanghai Zhongxi No. 2 School. She secondary studied at St. Mary's Hall. She studied and then taught at Shanghai Medical College. In 1980 she pursued advanced studies in the United States and United Kingdom, where she studied at the National Institutes of Health and the University of London respectively. After returning China she led the research on therapeutic hepatitis B vaccine. In 1999 she was elected an academician of the Chinese Academy of Engineering (CAE). In February 2019 she was elected an academician of the American Society for Microbiology (ASM).
