= Xia Yan =

Xia Yan is the name of:

- Xia Yan (Ming dynasty) (夏言; 1482–1548), Ming dynasty politician
- Xia Yan (playwright) (夏衍; 1900–1995), Chinese playwright, screenwriter and official
