= Luo Xiang =

Chinese legal scholar

- 罗翔
- Born: 1977 (age 48–49); Leiyang, Hunan, China
- Education: China Youth University of Political Studies (LLB); China University of Political Science and Law (LLM); Peking University (LLD)
- Occupations: Lawyer, Jurist, Professor
- Organization: China University of Political Science and Law
- Known for: Legal lecture

Bilibili information
- Channel: 罗翔说刑法
- Years active: 2020–present
- Genres: Comedy; education
- Followers: 32,082,317
- Last updated: March 2, 2026

Luo Xiang (Chinese: 罗翔; born 1977) is a Chinese jurist. He serves as professor of law and director of the Institute of Criminal Law at the China University of Political Science and Law. He is also a lawyer with his field of study centered on criminal justice and sex crimes. He is best known for his tutorials with humorous analogies and thorough interpretations on the National Legal Examination going viral on social medias including Bilibili, where he receives pervasive critical acclaim among the younger generation.

In December 2020, Luo Xiang was nominated as "person of the year in rule of law" by China Central Television, for his endeavors in conveying spirits of the law to the general public in China.

Luo Xiang is experienced in the National Judicial Examination. He participated several times in setting examination questions for the Central College for Judicial Officers of the Ministry of Justice of the People's Republic of China.
