= Huashan Hospital =

- Red Cross Society of China
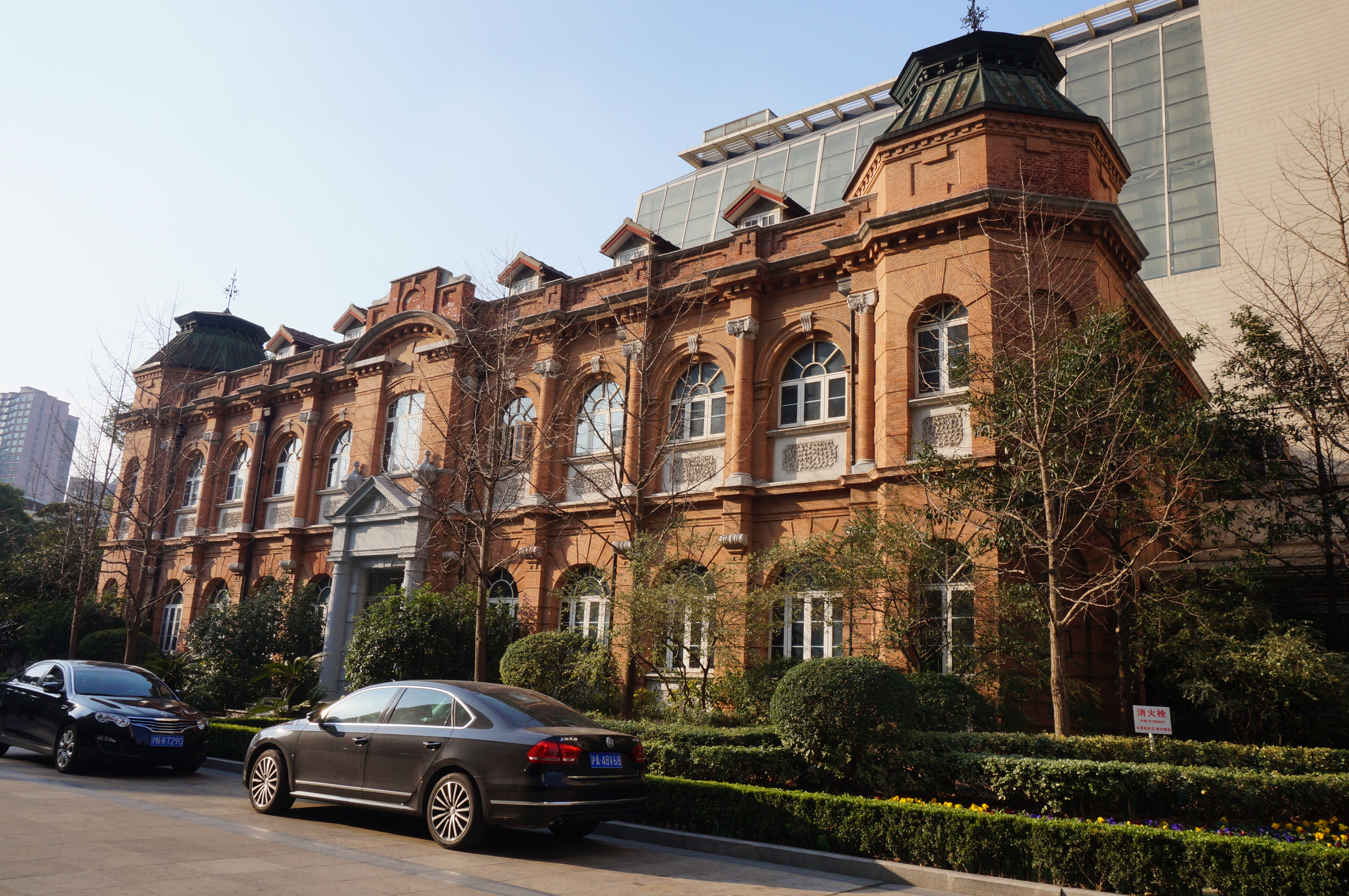
- The Harvard Building at Huashan Hospital

Geography
- Location: Xuhui District, Shanghai, China

Organisation
- Type: Teaching, District General
- Affiliated university: Shanghai Medical College of Fudan University

Services
- Emergency department: Yes
- Beds: 1,216 (main branch)

History
- Founded: 1907

Links
- Website: huashan.org.cn
- Lists: Hospitals in China

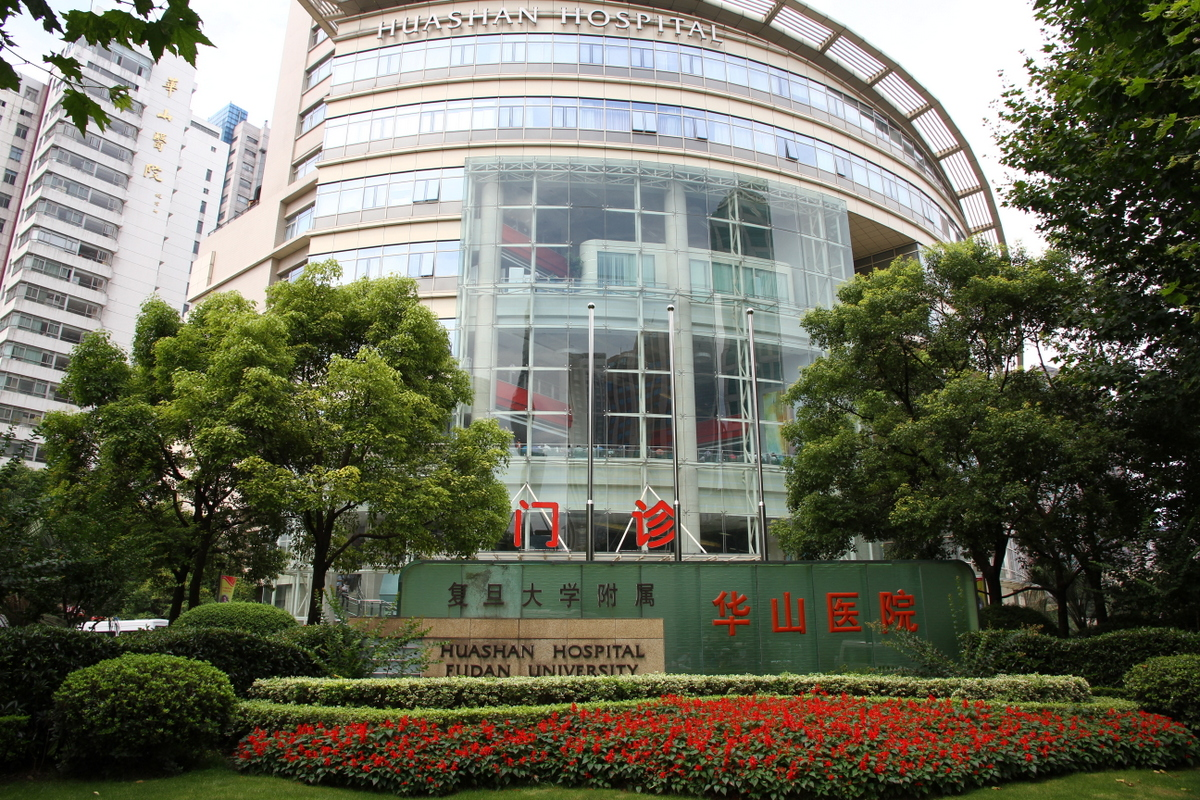
Entrance

Huashan Hospital (simplified Chinese: 华山医院; traditional Chinese: 華山醫院), formerly Chinese Red Cross General Hospital, is founded by Red Cross Society of China in 1907. It is the district general hospital operated by the Red Cross Society of China in Shanghai, China, and is affiliated with the Shanghai Medical College of Fudan University.

== History ==
Huashan Hospital was founded in 1907 as the Chinese Red Cross General Hospital (Chinese: 中國紅十字會總醫院). It was established by Shen Dunhe, the founder of the Red Cross Society of China, and opened for business in 1909. From 1913 to 1918, it served as a teaching hospital of Harvard University, and regularly sent its doctors and researchers to Harvard for training. Then it cooperated with the Seventh-day Adventist Church for three years. It has been a teaching hospital of then National Central University Medical College (known as [National] Shanghai Medical College later) since 1928. In 1932, it was renamed the First Hospital of the Red Cross Society of China (Chinese: 中國紅十字會第一醫院). It was renamed as Huashan Hospital in 1956. In 2004, Huashan re-established sister hospital relationship with Massachusetts General Hospital, the main teaching hospital of Harvard.

== Staff and facilities ==
The main branch of Huashan Hospital has 1,216 beds. In 2014, it treated 60,000 inpatients and 3.84 million outpatients, half of whom came from outside of Shanghai. More than 40,000 surgeries were performed in the same year.

The hospital has a total staff of more than 2,600, with 83% medical and technical professionals, among them 400 are professors and associate professors, including three academicians of the Chinese Academy of Engineering and the Chinese Academy of Sciences.

Huashan Hospital has established 39 clinical and auxiliary departments, ten of which have been recognized by the Ministry of Education of China as national key clinical medical specialties: Neurosurgery, Hand Surgery, Pancreatic Surgery, Neurology, Integrated Traditional Chinese Medicine, Urology, Nephrology, Infectious Diseases and Antibiotics, Radiology, Cardiology and Surgery.

== Branches ==
Huashan Hospital established its Eastern Branch, also called the Shanghai International Hospital, in Jinqiao, Pudong New Area in April 2006. It has 200 beds and mainly serves the large expatriate community in Pudong.

The Northern Branch of Huashan Hospital is in Gucun, Baoshan District, mainly serving residents of Shanghai's northern suburbs. It has 600 beds and more than 800 staff.

Huashan Hospital's Western Branch is located near the Hongqiao transportation hub, serving local residents as well as patients arriving from outside of Shanghai. It has 800 beds.

== Notable doctors ==
- Shen Ziyin, member of the Chinese Academy of Sciences
- Zhou Liangfu, member of the Chinese Academy of Engineering
- Gu Yudong, member of the Chinese Academy of Engineering
