= Shanghai Medical College, Fudan University =

Medical school in Shanghai, China

- 复旦大学上海医学院 (Chinese)
- Former names: Shanghai Medical University; Shanghai First Medical College; National Shanghai Medical College
- Motto: 正谊明道, Zhèngyí Míngdào
- Type: Public
- Established: 1927; 99 years ago
- Parent institution: Fudan University
- Dean: Gui Yonghao (桂永浩)
- Faculty: Teaching Faculty 554, PhD Advisor 249, Master Advisor 204
- Location: Shanghai, China; 31°11′52″N 121°27′07″E
- Address: 138 Yixueyuan Road, Shanghai
- Nicknames: Chinese: 上医; pinyin: Shàngyī; lit. 'Shanghai-Med'
- Website: shmc.fudan.edu.cn

Chinese name
- Simplified Chinese: 复旦大学上海医学院
- Traditional Chinese: 復旦大學上海醫學院
Transcriptions
Standard Mandarin
- Hanyu Pinyin: Fùdàn Dàxué Shànghǎi Yīxuéyuàn

The Shanghai Medical College, Fudan University, formerly Shanghai Medical University, is the medical school of Fudan University in Shanghai, China.

Established in 1927, Shanghai Medical University was merged into Fudan University in April 2000 to become its medical school. On July 27, 2001, Shanghai Medical College of Fudan University was established, with Professor Wang Weiping as its first dean, and the original site of Shanghai Medical University was then designated as the Fenglin Campus of Fudan University.

== Location ==
The college is located to the east of Xujiahui, in Xuhui District, Shanghai. It is located adjacent to Zhaojiabang Road Station, served by Shanghai Metro Lines 7 and 9.

== History ==
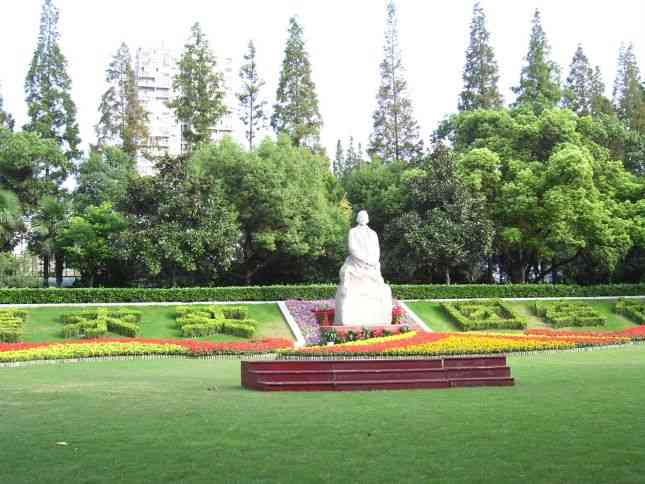
East Campus of the Medical College with a statue of its founder Yan Fuqing

- 1927 The Medical College of Shanghai was founded, comprising part of National Fourth Zhongshan University whose main campus was in Nanjing, when Jiangsu Medical University originated in 1902 in Suzhou was merged into the university, and the degree of Doctor of Medicine was awarded to qualified graduates who completed study of 2 years in Nanjing and 5 years in Shanghai campus as designed. It was the first medical school established by a national university in China. The founding figures include a number of distinguished Chinese medical experts. (Note: The founding figures include Yan Fuqing (颜福庆), a public health expert (Doctor of Medicine of Yale University), who was the first dean, Le Wenzhao, a medical specialist (Doctor of Medicine of Harvard University), who was initially the acting dean, Niu Huilin, a surgical specialist (Doctor of Medicine of Cambridge University. Niu Huisheng, his younger brother, was an orthopedist and Doctor of Medicine of Harvard, who founded Shanghai Orthopedics Hospital in 1928 and was also the first director of Zhongshan Hospital affiliated to Shanghai Medical College), Gao Jinglang, a pedologist (studied at University of Nanking and Hsiangya Medical College), Gu Jingqian, a pathologist (studied at University of Heidelberg and University of Berlin), Zhang Yun, an anatomist (Doctor of Medicine of Harvard), Lin Guogao, a biochemist (phD, Harvard), etc.) In the beginning the Shanghai medical college rented Huashan Hospital as its teaching hospital which was under deficit, and in 1929, under the director Yan Fuqing, the hospital turned losses into gains. In 1930 when Yan Fuqing was the college dean, Shanghai Medical Center (Zhongshan Hospital) was initiated, and Zhongshan Hospital was opened in 1937.
- 1928 Fourth Zhongshan University was renamed Jiangsu University, and in May of the same year was again renamed to National Central University (which itself was to be renamed Nanjing University in 1949).
- 1932 National Central University Medical College became an independent institution under the name of National Shanghai Medical College.
- 1937 Moved to Kunming, Yunnan because of the Second Sino-Japanese War.
- 1940 Relocated to Chongqing.
- 1946 Returned to Shanghai after the end of the war.
- 1952 Renamed Shanghai First Medical College.
- 1959 Designated by the state government as one of the sixteen national key institutions of higher education in China.
- 1985 Named Shanghai Medical University.
- 2000 Merged with Fudan University.
- 2001 Established as Fudan University Shanghai Medical College (aka Medical Center of Fudan University).

=== Campus Reconstruction ===
In July 2014, Shanghai Medical College's campus began a 2-year large-scale construction project and was open for use in late 2017. New facilities include new student residential colleges with residential towers, food services, and activity space, two research complexes, an indoor swimming center with rooftop soccer field, and a 20-story library tower, which was built with ¥100 million CNY (US$16.1 million) of support from Powerlong Group Development Co. Ltd. and Shanghai Haosheng Investment Group. The campus now has campus-wide high-speed Wi-Fi and 24-hour study spaces for students and staff.

== Education and research ==
Today, the college has 27 departments in the basic medical sciences and clinical medicine, 20 national key disciplines, 1 national key laboratory, 8 Project 211 key disciplines, 9 key laboratories under the supervision of the Ministry of Education or the Ministry of Health of the People's Republic of China, 2 municipal key disciplines and 8 Shanghai Clinic Medical Centers. It has 4 research stations that offer postdoctoral fellowships, 29 doctoral programs and 36 master programs.

The college offers undergraduate programs in Clinical Medicine, Basic Medicine and Forensic Medicine. The Clinical Medicine programs include a standard 5-year program offering the Bachelor of Medicine degree, a six-year program offering the Bachelor of Medicine, Bachelor of Surgery degree, and an eight-year program offering the Doctor of Medicine degree.

As a part of Fudan University, the college offers interdisciplinary programs while featuring its focus in medicine and clinical study. The college faculty includes a number of well-known experts and professors who are highly respected for their academic achievements and medical skills. Among them are 2 members of the Chinese Academy of Sciences, 4 members of the Chinese Academy of Engineering, 10 Cheung Kong Distinguished Professor of the Ministry of Education of China, and 10 faculties funded by the National Outstanding Youth Foundation. At present, the college has 249 PhD advisors and 249 master advisors.

The college has established cooperative relations and exchange programs with numerous medical schools throughout the world, including those of Harvard University, Columbia University, University of Sydney, University of British Columbia, Umeå University, Osaka University, University of Hong Kong, and Chinese University of Hong Kong.

The Ministry of Education of China has approved Fudan University as one of the thirty qualified universities in China to enroll international students in both its English-taught and Chinese-taught programs of medicine.

=== Academic departments ===
==== Basic medicine ====
- Department of Anatomy and Histo-embryology
- Department of Cellular and Genetic Medicine
- Department of Biochemistry and Molecular Biology
- Department of Microbiology and Parasitology
- Department of Immunology
- Department of Physiology and Pathophysiology
- Department of Pathology
- Department of Pharmacology
- Department of Forensic Medicine

==== Clinical specialties ====
- Department of Internal Medicine
- Department of Surgery
- Department of Pediatrics
- Department of Obstetrics and Gynecology
- Department of Neurology
- Department of Dermatology and Venereal Disease
- Department of Ophthalmology
- Department of Otolaryngology
- Department of Oncology
- Department of Mental Medicine
- Department of Medical Imaging
- Department of Rehabilitative and Sports Medicine
- Department of Anesthesiology
- Department of Integrated Traditional Chinese Medicine and Western Medicine
- Department of Clinical Diagnostics
- Department of Stomatology
- Department of Plastic Surgery
- Department of Family Medicine

=== Laboratories ===
==== Basic sciences ====
- State Key Laboratory of Medical Neurobiology
- Key Laboratory of Medical Molecular Virology, Ministry of Education and Health
- Key Laboratory of Molecular Medicine, Ministry of Education and Health
- Laboratory of Molecular Genetics
- Gene Research Center
- Electron Microscopy Laboratory
- Clinical Skills Learning Center

==== Clinical research ====
- Key Laboratory of Clinical Pharmacology of Antibiotics, Ministry of Health
- Key Laboratory of Hearing Medicine, Ministry of Health
- Key Laboratory of Viral Heart Diseases, Ministry of Health
- Key Laboratory of Neonatal Diseases, Ministry of Health
- Key Laboratory of Hand Function Reconstruction, Ministry of Health
- Key Laboratory of Complex Carbohydrates, Ministry of Health
- Key Laboratory of Myopia, Ministry of Health

== Fudan University Journal of Medical Sciences ==
The Fudan University Journal of Medical Sciences (simplified Chinese: 复旦学报（医学版）; traditional Chinese: 復旦學報（醫學版）) is a comprehensive national key medical journal managed by Fudan University under the supervision of the Ministry of Education of China, and is distributed domestically and internationally. Formerly known as the Journal of Shanghai Medical University, it was founded in June 1956. It mainly publishes original articles in the area of basic medicine, clinical medicine, pharmacology and preventive medicine, but it also covers a wide variety of columns including reviews, case reports, methodologies and brief communications.

The journal is indexed in internationally renowned abstracts services, e.g. American-based Chemical Abstracts Service (CA) and Biological Abstracts (BA), Amsterdam-based EMBASE or Excerpta Medica (EM), Russia-based Abstracts Journal, and various domestic medical abstracts and academic journal full-text databases.

== Teaching hospitals ==
The college has 11 affiliated teaching hospitals which serve as the school's teaching and internship bases.

- Zhongshan Hospital
- Huashan Hospital
- Children's Hospital of Fudan University
- Red House Hospital (Obstetrics and Gynecology Hospital)
- Eye and ENT Hospital of Fudan University
- Shanghai Cancer Center
- Huadong Hospital
- Shanghai Public Health Clinical Center
- Shanghai Fifth People's Hospital
- Jinshan Hospital
- Pudong Hospital

== Notable alumni ==
Name	Chinese name	Born	Job	Description
Chen Haozhu	陈灏珠	1927–	Professor of Medicine at Zhongshan Hospital	specializes in Cardiovascular diseases member of Chinese Academy of Engineering.
Chen Zhongwei	陈中伟	1929–2004	Professor of Surgery at Zhongshan Hospital	specializes in Orthopedic Surgery and Microsurgery member of Chinese Academy of Sciences.
Gu Yudong	顾玉东	1937–	Professor of Surgery at Huashan Hospital	specializes in Hand Surgery; Academician of Chinese Academy of Engineering.
Shen Ziyin	沈自尹	1928–2019	Professor of Medicine at Huashan Hospital	specializes in Integrated Traditional Chinese Medicine; Academician of Chinese Academy of Sciences.
Tang Zhaoyou	汤钊猷	1930–	Professor of Surgery at Zhongshan Hospital	specializes in Liver Cancer; Academician of Chinese Academy of Engineering.
Wang Zhengmin	王正敏	1935–	Professor of Eye Surgery at the Eye and ENT Hospital of Fudan University	specializes in Otology; Academician of Chinese Academy of Sciences.
Wen Yumei	闻玉梅	1934–	Professor at Shanghai Medical College	specializes in molecular biology and immunology of Hepatitis B Virus; Academician of Chinese Academy of Engineering.
