= COVID-19 pandemic in Shanghai =

Ongoing COVID-19 viral pandemic in Shanghai

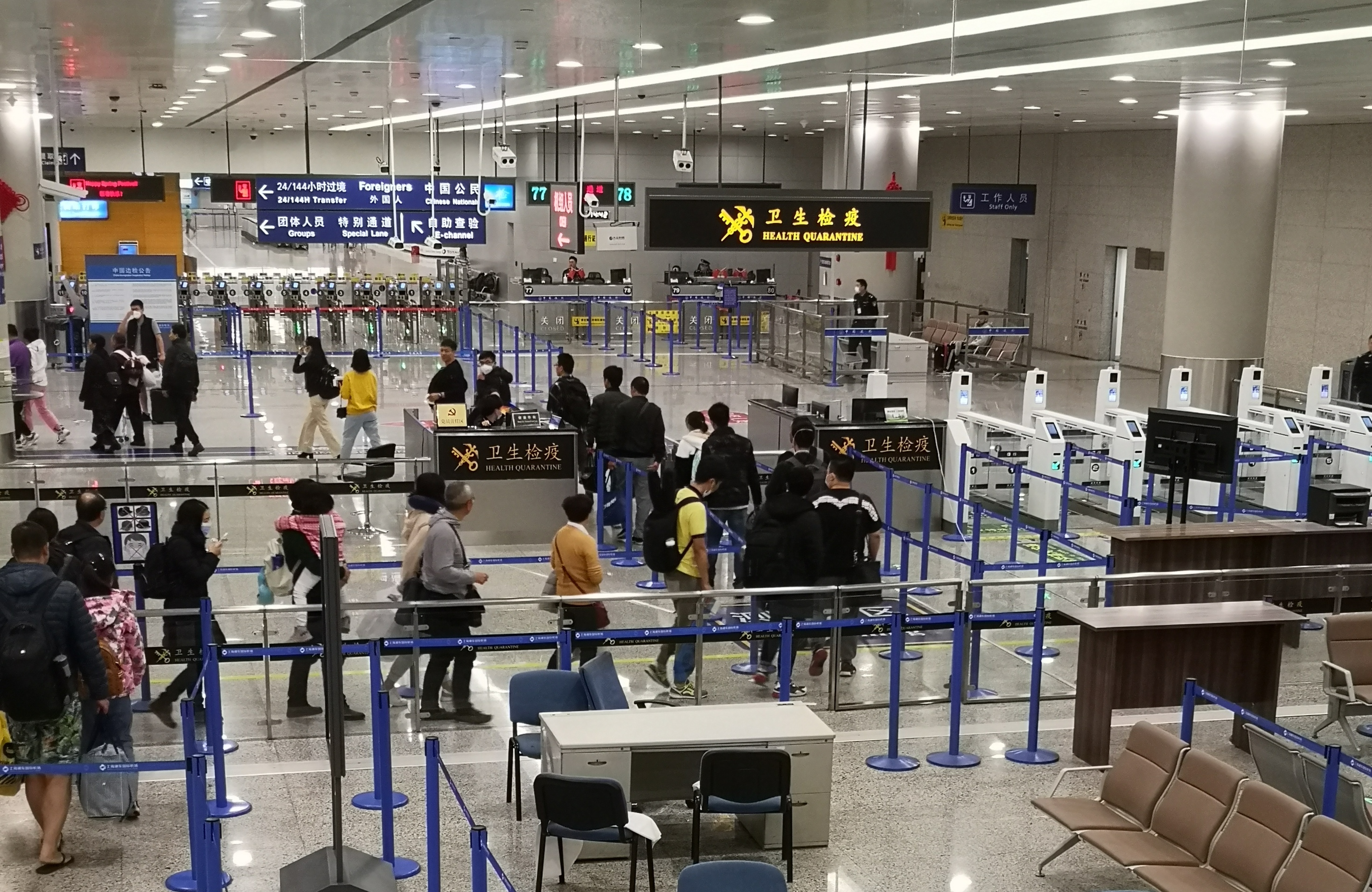
- Health screening at Shanghai Pudong International Airport – January 2020
- Disease: COVID-19
- Pathogen: SARS-CoV-2
- Location: Shanghai, China
- First outbreak: Wuhan, Hubei
- Index case: 31 December 2019
- Arrival date: 20 January 2020 (6 years, 10 months and 2 days ago)
- Confirmed cases: 65,641
- Active cases: 96
- Recovered: 61,600
- Deaths: 595

The COVID-19 pandemic in Shanghai is a part of the worldwide pandemic of coronavirus disease 2019 (COVID-19) caused by severe acute respiratory syndrome coronavirus 2 (SARS-CoV-2). The disease was first confirmed in Shanghai on 20 January 2020. As of 14 October 2022, 65,641 confirmed cases cumulatively occurred in the city, of which 3,045 cases were imported from abroad. Of the 96 active hospitalized cases ending at midnight, 94 were in stable condition and 1 was in critical condition; 61,600 had cumulatively recovered and been discharged, and 595 died.

== Related measures ==
On 24 January, Shanghai announced the initiation of Level 1 Response for major public health emergency.

=== Lockdown and city restrictions ===
On 21 January, Shanghai announces the suspension of local live poultry trading.

On 25 January, Shanghai announced a 14-day quarantine and medical observation for arrivals from key areas of Hubei.

United Daily News reported that on 22 January, a customer in Shanghai waited in line at a pharmacy for nearly an hour to limit the purchase of a pack of masks, which were sold out in 30 minutes. On 31 January, Shanghai Municipal Government announced that from 2 February, citizens can make registration appointments at designated places in each residence (village), and then purchase face masks at designated drugstores. 5 masks can be purchased per household, limited to one purchase by appointment only. From 31 January, all persons entering Shanghai are required to complete a health registration.

As of 10 February, most of the 13,000 residential quarters in Shanghai had implemented "closed management" and adopted entrance and exit management measures, including: strictly controlling the number of entrances and exits in the neighbourhood, strengthening the staffing of gatekeepers, and achieving staffing Entering must ask, register, and measure temperature. If the body temperature is abnormal, it will be reported and transferred in time according to the established "full chain disposal mechanism"

From 10 February, authorities have decided to temporarily suspend the entry of persons who have no place of residence in Shanghai and do not have a clear job during the epidemic prevention and control period. On 17 February, the "On-Demand Code" (随申办, suíshēnbàn), developed on the basis of "On-Demand Application" (mobile terminal run by Shanghai One Netcom), was officially launched online, with a three-colour dynamic management scheme of green, yellow and red. The scope of the pilot application included multiple scenarios such as offline parks, streets and towns.

On 3 March, Shanghai allowed logistics personnel, service personnel, maintenance personnel of public utilities, and courier personnel to enter communities if they showed a green "On-Demand Code", normal body temperature measurement, registration, and received residents' consent. From 4 March, Shanghai announced that all passengers who had traveled or lived in Korea, Italy, Iran, Japan and other countries within 14 days before entering Shanghai will implement home or centralized health surveillance for 14 days. From 13 March, the policy was expanded to eight countries: South Korea, Italy, Iran, Japan, France, Spain, Germany, and the United States.

Shanghai authorities announced a city-wide lockdown split in two stages for mass testing on 27 March 2022, after the city reached its highest recorded daily new cases due to the Omicron variant. Starting on 28 March, residents living east of the Huangpu River would go into lockdown for four days, and the other half for the remaining four.

=== Suspensions of cultural, sport, and educational activities ===
On 22 January, Shanghai Municipal Culture and Tourism Bureau announced the postponement of the "2020 Wei Tour Shanghai" event, per the Emergency Notice on Prevention and Control of Pneumonia Epidemic of New Coronavirus Infection issued by Shanghai Municipal Culture and Tourism Bureau.

On 23 January, Shanghai announced that all training institutions and daycare institutions would temporarily suspend offline services until 29 February. The Shanghai Museum announced that the total number of daily visits would be reduced by 40%, and the temperature of all visitors would be measured, and then subsequently announced its closure during the Spring Festival from 24 January to 8 February. Shanghai Science and Technology Museum, Shanghai Museum of Natural Science (Shanghai Science and Technology Museum Branch), and Shanghai Disneyland were also temporarily closed from 25 January 2020. Shanghai Grand Theatre cancelled all performances and public cultural events from 24 January to 9 February.

On 26 January, the Shanghai Education Commission issued a notice stating that all types of primary and secondary schools, nursery schools, and kindergartens cannot start school before 17 February, canceling school holidays and childcare classes; all day-care facilities were postponed until the end of February. Shanghai Municipal Government stipulates that various enterprises in the Shanghai area should resume work no earlier than 24:00 on 9 February; later, due to the development of the epidemic, it was changed to that schools of all levels and classes will not open before the end of February. All training institutions and day care institutions would temporarily suspend offline services before the end of February. Later it was decided that starting in March, Shanghai universities, primary and secondary schools will launch online education, and students would not go to school.

On 28 January, a 2020 AFC Champions League playoff was held at Yuanshen Sports Center Stadium to an empty stadium, between Shanghai SIPG and Buriram United.

At the press conference on 31 January, Zhang Qi, deputy director of the Shanghai Municipal Culture and Tourism Bureau, said that after the epidemic, more than 4,200 venues such as museums, art galleries, libraries, cultural centres, tourism service consulting centres, and song and dance entertainment venues in Shanghai Facilities, 113 A-level tourist attractions, and non-A-level tourist attractions such as Shanghai Disneyland and Haichang Ocean Park were temporarily closed. 104 business performances and more than 2,700 public cultural events are suspended. Travel agencies have suspended team travel and "ticket + hotel" travel products. Cruises to and from Shanghai were cancelled from 30 January.

On 7 February, the Shanghai Municipal Bureau of Culture and Tourism issued the "Notice on temporarily retiring some of the tourism service quality deposits and supporting travel agencies to cope with operational difficulties". Travel agencies that meet the requirements can temporarily refund 80% of the tourism service quality deposits. On 12 February, Formula One announced that its F1 Chinese Grand Prix held in Shanghai was delayed, then later cancelled on 25 August after the rescheduled calendar involving Middle East races.

From 9 March, some shopping and dining shops and some leisure experiences of Disney Town, Xingyuan Park and Shanghai Disneyland Hotel resumed operation. Additionally, 8 A-level tourist attractions in Shanghai reopened. As of 12 March, 22 tourist attractions in Shanghai had reopened.

=== Travel restrictions ===
On 22 January, Shanghai started temperature measurement inspections of person arriving from Wuhan at all stations and airports. On the same day, Shanghai suspended long-distance passenger transportation and inter-provincial charter buses to Wuhan. On 23 January, authorities jointly strengthened the inspection of highway toll stations and ground crossing checkpoints entering the city's borders, but only for vehicles and personnel from key areas.

The Pujiang tour was suspended from 24 January, and all cruises were cancelled. On 26 January, to prevent the spread of the epidemic, the section of Shanghai Metro Line 11 entering Kunshan City (Huaqiao Station to Anting Station) were suspended from 1 pm on that day. Starting from the same day, all shuttle buses and inter-provincial charter buses dispatched and arrived at Shanghai Inter-provincial Bus Terminal were suspended.

On 27 January, Shanghai Public Security Bureau stated that starting 14:00 on the same day, pneumococcal epidemic prevention and control of the novel coronavirus would be started at provincial public security checkpoints on highways entering Shanghai, following the work requirement of "checking every vehicle". In addition, all bus lines operating across provinces in Shanghai were adjusted to be suspended or not operating across provinces (line reduction to within Shanghai).

From 3 February, Shanghai Metro instituted temperature measurements at security checkpoints at Shanghai railway station, Pudong International Airport station, Shanghai South railway station, Hongqiao railway station, Hongqiao Terminal 2 station, and Hongqiao Terminal 1 station. On 6 February, another 51 stations were added to implement passenger "temperature measured" station entrance.

From 5 February, masks must be worn to enter Shanghai Metro. From 8 February, Shanghai's novel coronavirus infection pneumonia epidemic prevention and control headquarters required people entering public places such as airports, railway stations, coach stations, rail transit stations, medical and health institutions, shopping malls, and supermarkets to wear masks and cooperate with temperature tests.

On 14 February, the Jiading District of Shanghai and Kunshan City, Jiangsu signed the Memorandum of Joint Prevention and Control of Jiading and Kunming, which explicitly stated that the Jiading and Kunshan crossings mutually recognised the "Work Commute Certificate" issued by both parties, and the "Temporary Pass" issued for the communities of Jiading Anting and Kunshan Huaqiao, for people working and living across regions to pass. Those who have received the above documents will take their temperature and present their ID cards or valid IDs, as well as the "Temporary Pass" of Jiading Anting and Kunshan Huaqiao Residential Quarters, can enter and exit the two places through the dedicated channel during the morning and evening peak hours, without repeating reporting personal information. On 16 February, Jinshan District signed a similar agreement with Pinghu City and Jiashan County in Zhejiang, adopting a convenient transportation policy for those who work and live in the three places.

On 17 February, the Shanghai Municipal Transportation Commission issued the Shanghai "Yangtze River Delta Outbreak Prevention and Control Integrated Transport Vehicle Pass". Licensed freight vehicles can travel easily in the Yangtze River Delta region; after returning to Shanghai, licensed freight practitioners do not need to be quarantined again for 14 days. On 17 February, Shanghai announced that masks must be worn to take public transport and taxis.

From 20 February, Shanghai enterprises can apply to the Shanghai Road Transport Administration to organise for employees to return to Shanghai by means of inter-provincial charter buses. From 22 February, the end of the Shanghai Metro Lines 2, 5, 7, 8, and 16 operations were advanced to 21:00. From 23 February, multiple traffic crossings at the junctions of Shanghai with Jiangsu and Zhejiang resumed traffic. On 25 February, Shanghai announced the gradual roll-out of the "scanning code registration" measures for public transport passengers.

On 28 February, the city's metro system launched QR code scan registration for rail transit passengers in each of its carriages.

Effective 25 March, all international and Hong Kong, Macau, and Taiwan flights from Hongqiao Airport were to be handled at Pudong Airport in order to consolidate efforts at tracking and curtailing the importation of COVID-19 cases.

=== Handling of related illegal acts ===
On 7 February, Shanghai Municipal People's Congress Standing Committee voted to pass its decision on epidemic prevention and control. It stipulated various legal responsibilities of units and individuals for violating laws, regulations and the Decision, and made clear that if any individuals conceal medical history and travel history in key areas, in addition to strict legal investigations, relevant departments would be able to collect their untrustworthy information into the Shanghai Public Credit Information Platform and take disciplinary measures.

As of 15 February, Shanghai Procuratorate had intervened in advance in 62 criminal cases related to epidemic prevention and control under criminal investigations initiated by public security organs in accordance with law. 8 arrests for 9 persons had been approved, and 1 prosecution for 1 person had been filed. Three of them went out without authorisation during home isolation and were punished by the police.

==== Price gouging ====
On 30 January, the Xuhui branch of Carrefour was fined ¥2 million (US$288,276) for price gouging lettuce and/or greens by up to 692%, among other foods.

==== Hindrance of epidemic prevention and control ====
On 7 February, a 44-year-old man entered the Linping Road Station of Metro Line 4 without wearing a mask. After being stopped, he did not obey the security team members and station staff to dissuade him. He hustled the security team members and was eventually put under the administration detention. On 11 February, Shanghai Procuratorate arrested two criminal suspects for obstructing the control of the epidemic for obstructing public affairs and suspicion of trouble provocation.

On 13 February, the Jinshan Branch of Shanghai Public Security Bureau took criminal coercive measures against a 60-year-old male discharged from COVID-19 for deliberately concealing his real schedule on suspicion of obstructing the prevention of infectious diseases. On 14 February, a foreigner was detained by the Shanghai Baoshan Police for failing to enter and exit the community with the community entry and exit certificate and refusing to cooperate with the community staff to take a temperature test. On 18 February, the first case of assault of an epidemic prevention volunteer in Shanghai was heard in Shanghai Minhang Court. The court sentenced the defendant Ling to a crime of provocation for 1 year and 6 months.

On the morning of 21 February, Shanghai's first case of interference against public service involving prevention and control of an epidemic was heard. Shanghai Qingpu Court sentenced the defendant Zhang to 8 months in jail for public service interference. On 22 February, the police took criminal coercive measures against a 62-year-old man Li discharged from the hospital because he had concealed his illness.

==== Wildlife trading ====
On 26 February, the first case of illegal wildlife trading during the epidemic control was seized.

==== Censorship by authorities ====
On 12 February, Xinzhen Police Station of Minhang Public Security Bureau arrested two men, Gu and Shao, on suspicion of fabricating a rumour, "Person refusing home isolation committed suicide from jumping". On 13 February, a man was detained by police for disrupting public order for 10 days, after claiming on WeChat that a major massive outbreak occurred in Shanghai.

==== Fraud for epidemic prevention ====
On 3 March, the Minhang court heard the first case of fraud involving epidemic prevention materials in Shanghai. The defendant Yan was sentenced to six years and six months in prison for fraud and fined RMB 50,000. The illegal income was recovered.

=== Others ===
On 25 January, the Shanghai Civil Affairs Bureau announced that marriage registration agencies at 17 municipal and district levels in the city would no longer carry out marriage registrations overtime on 2 February 2020 as originally scheduled.

On 3 February, Shanghai Human Resources and Social Security Bureau announced at a press conference of the headquarters of the Shanghai Epidemic Prevention and Control Work Leading Group that it would implement measures to reduce the burden of unemployment insurance, such as the policy of steady return of unemployment insurance and extension of the social insurance payment period, to reduce the burden on enterprises.

On 8 February, in order to reduce the burden on enterprises, Shanghai issued 28 comprehensive policy measures to support enterprises in fighting the epidemic.

On 14 February, the Publicity Department of the Shanghai Municipal Party Committee issued "Several Policies and Measures to Fully Support and Serve the Cultural Industry's Stable and Healthy Development of Epidemic Prevention and Control".

== Related incidents ==
Around 11:30 on 1 February, a 35-year-old woman from Huanggang, Hubei died in a rental house in Shenglanyuan community on Kanglan Road, Pudong New District. Jiang came to Shanghai in October 2019 and had never left Shanghai. According to forensic examination, the deceased died of sudden death due to vomit entering the respiratory tract. Homicide was ruled out, and the novel coronavirus nucleic acid test result of the deceased was negative.

Some Shanghai residents believed that in the early days of the epidemic prevention and control, the Shanghai government's response measures were significantly slower than those in neighbouring provinces. Some Shanghai netizens used the grievance tag "#应勇则戆卵#" ("#YingYongTheEejit") on social media, but the tag disappeared quickly. On 13 February 2020, the Central Committee of the Chinese Communist Party appointed the mayor of Shanghai Ying Yong to the secretary of the Hubei Provincial Party Committee of the Chinese Communist Party. After the news came out, some Shanghai netizens "happily sent off" Ying Yong for leaving Shanghai on social media.

== 2022 outbreak and lockdown ==
A COVID-19 outbreak in Shanghai began on 1 March 2022. The outbreak was caused by the SARS-CoV-2 Omicron variant and it is the most widespread COVID-19 outbreak in Shanghai. The city decided to impose a lockdown since 27 March and most areas commenced "area-separated control" since 1 April. The lockdown of the city was an effort to uphold Chinese Communist Party leader Xi Jinping's zero-COVID policy, marking the largest in China since the lockdown of Hubei in early 2020.

On 8 April, multiple reports of people screaming from their windows in Shanghai appeared on social medias. Additionally, there were reports of the government using drones to broadcast the message "Control the soul's desire for freedom and do not open the window to sing. This behaviour has the risk of spreading the epidemic."

On 18 April, for the first time since Shanghai entered the lockdown in late March 2022, China announced three deaths from COVID-19. However, it is suspected that the number of COVID-19 related deaths in Shanghai is much higher than reported.

On 6 May, in Shanghai, which is entering its second month of lockdown, city officials said cases have been declining since 22 April and its outbreak is under control, though they did not signal that measures will be relaxed anytime soon. From 0:00 on 1 June, Shanghai lifted the city-wide lockdown, declaring that it would do its best to recover the losses caused by the epidemic.

== Statistics ==
Ordinary residence of persons	Confirmed	Deaths	Recoveries
Shanghai	65,641	595	61,600
Pudong New Area	100	2	82
Baoshan District	100	1	25
Minhang District	100	0	19
Xuhui District	100	1	17
Jing'an District	100	0	16
Songjiang District	100	0	15
Changning District	100	0	14
Putuo District	100	0	11
Yangpu District	100	0	10
Jiading District	100	0	8
Fengxian District	100	0	9
Hongkou District	100	0	7
Huangpu District	100	0	21
Qingpu District	100	0	7
Jinshan District	100	0	4
Chongming District	100	0	4
Persons from Wuhan	79	1	78
Persons from Hubei excl. Wuhan	24	0	24
Persons from Jiangsu	3	0	3
Persons from Anhui	2	0	2
Persons from Heilongjiang	1	0	1
Persons from Hunan	1	0	1
Persons from Shaanxi	1	0	1
Persons from Gansu	1	0	0
Persons from Zhejiang	1	0	1
Persons from United Kingdom	34	0	0
Persons from United States	18	0	0
Persons from Italy	10	0	1
Persons from Spain	10	0	0
Persons from France	7	0	0
Persons from Iran	4	0	1
Persons from Switzerland	4	0	0
Persons from Portugal	1	0	0
Persons from Burkina Faso	1	0	0
Persons from Sweden	1	0	0
Persons from Thailand	1	0	0
Persons from Canada	1	0	0
As of 13 January 2022 at 24:00 CST (The data for confirmed cases include deaths and recoveries)

Date	Jan 2020												Feb																		Total
Date	20	21	22	23	24	25	26	27	28	29	30	31	1	2	3	4	5	6	7	8	9	10	11	12	13	14	15	16	17	18	Total
City-wide case data
Confirmed cases
Shanghai Residents		6	–	–	–	–	30	33	40	53	70	85	103	117	129	149	166	177	187	195	198	205	207	214	216	217	219	222	223	223	
Persons from elsewhere	1	3	–	–	–	–	23	33	40	48	58	68	74	76	79	84	88	92	94	97	97	97	99	99	102	109	109	109	110	110	
Total increase on the day	1	8	7	4	13	7	13	13	14	21	27	25	24	16	15	25	21	15	12	11	3	7	4	7	5	8	2	3	2		
Total	1	9	16	20	33	40	53	66	80	101	128	153	177	193	208	233	254	269	281	292	295	302	306	313	318	326	328	331	333	333	
Recovered cases
Shanghai Residents										1	1	3	3	3	3	4	7	11	14	21	23	25	27	31	35	55	76	87	102	113	
Persons from elsewhere					1	1	1	3	4	4	4	6	7	7	7	8	8	14	16	20	21	23	26	26	27	35	48	53	59	64	
Total increase on the day					1			2	1	1		4	1			2	3	10	5	11	3	4	5	4	5	28	34	16	21	16	
Total					1	1	1	3	4	5	5	9	10	10	10	12	15	25	30	41	44	48	53	57	62	90	124	140	161	177	
Death cases
Persons from elsewhere						1	1	1	1	1	1	1	1	1	1	1	1	1	1	1	1	1	1	1	1	1	1	1	1	1	
Total increase on the day						1																									
Total						1	1	1	1	1	1	1	1	1	1	1	1	1	1	1	1	1	1	1	1	1	1	1	1	1	
Inpatient cases and classifications
Inpatient	1	9	16	20	32	38	51	62	75	95	122	143	166	182	197	220	238	243	250	250	250	253	252	255	255	235	203	190	171	155	
Stable																					230	233	233	239	239	218	186	172	153	137	
Severe																					10	10	9	6	5	5	4	4	4	4	
Critical																					10	10	10	10	11	12	13	14	14	14	
Cases data of Shanghai residents
Confirmed cases
Pudong District		7						2	3	1	9	5	5	7	1	5	2	3	3	3							1	2	1		60
Changning District		5									1		1		1	1	1	1					1	1							13
Jing'an District		5							2	1			1			3	2		1	1											16
Xuhui District		3								2			2		4	1	2	1	1					1		1					18
Hongkou District		2									2	1					2														7
Minhang District		2								1	2	2		2	1	1	1			2	1	2		1							18
Qingpu District		2														2	1														5
Huangpu District		1						1	1	1		1											1								6
Baoshan District		1							1			3	3	2	1	1	3	1	1		1	2					1				21
Jiading District		1								1					1		1	1	1		1	1			1						9
Fengxian District		1								4						1	1	2													9
Songjiang District										1	2		4			2	1		3	1											14
Jinshan District										1						1						1									3
Yangpu District											1	1		2	1	1		1				1			1						9
Putuo District												2	1	1	2			1		1				3							11
Chongming District													1			1								1				1			4
Sum		6	24					3	7	13	17	15	18	14	12	20	17	11	10	8	3	7	2	7	2	1	2	3	1		223
Total		6	–	–	–	–	30	33	40	53	70	85	103	117	129	149	166	177	187	195	198	205	207	214	216	217	219	222	223	223	
Recovered cases
Pudong District										3								3		2	1		1	2		11	4	4	2	4	37
Changning District										2									1							2	2		2		9
Jing'an District										1										1				1	1	1	2	1	3	3	14
Xuhui District										1																	1				2
Hongkou District																		1	1							1	1	1			5
Minhang District																			1											2	3
Qingpu District																				1				1		2			2		6
Huangpu District																				1	1	1					3	1	1		8
Baoshan District																				1		1					1	1			4
Jiading District																				1							1				2
Fengxian District																							1				1		3	1	6
Songjiang District																									1	1	3	1	1		7
Jinshan District																									1		1	1			3
Yangpu District																									1	1					2
Putuo District																										1	1	1	1		4
Chongming District																														1	1
Sum										1		2				1	3	4	3	7	2	2	2	4	4	20	21	11	15	11	113
Total										1	1	3	3	3	3	4	7	11	14	21	23	25	27	31	35	55	76	87	102	113	
Case data for person entering Shanghai from elsewhere
Confirmed cases
Wuhan	1	2	23						4	4	8	5	5	2	3	4	2	2	1				1		3	7					77
Other locales in Hubei			7						3	4		5	1				1			2											23
Heilongjiang											1																				1
Anhui											1							1													2
Hunan																1															1
Shaanxi																	1														1
Gansu																		1													1
Jiangsu																			1	1			1								3
Zhejiang																													1		1
Sum	1	2	20					10	7	8	10	10	6	2	3	5	4	4	2	3			2		3	7			1		110
Total	1	3	–	–	–	–	23	33	40	48	58	68	74	76	79	84	88	92	94	97	97	97	99	99	102	109	109	109	110	110	
Recovered cases
Wuhan					7													5	2	4	1	2	2			6	9	3	3	2	46
Other locales in Hubei					1													1					1			2	3	2	2	3	15
Anhui																									1						1
Heilongjiang																											1				1
Shaanxi																													1		1
Sum					1			2	1			2	1			1		6	2	4	1	2	3		1	8	13	5	6	5	64
Total					1	1	1	3	4	4	4	6	7	7	7	8	8	14	16	20	21	23	26	26	27	35	48	53	59	64	
Death cases
Wuhan						1																									1
Sum						1																									1
Total						1	1	1	1	1	1	1	1	1	1	1	1	1	1	1	1	1	1	1	1	1	1	1	1	1	
Sources																															

== See also ==
- COVID-19 pandemic in China
