= China Initiative =

US effort to prosecute alleged Chinese spies

The China Initiative was a program of the United States Department of Justice under President Donald Trump to combat alleged economic espionage and intellectual property theft purportedly linked to China. Launched in November 2018, the program targeted hundreds of prominent Chinese-American academics and scientists, of whom an estimated 250 lost their jobs. Many more had their careers negatively impacted, and the prosecutions also contributed to at least one suicide.

Critics argued that the prosecutions contributed to a rise in incidents of violence against Asian Americans from 2019 to 2020 and were racially biased and ineffective. In one case, an FBI agent admitted to making false statements in the investigation of Anming Hu, while in another case, the investigation involving Franklin Feng Tao was based on false evidence provided to the FBI. The Department of Justice claimed to have ended the program on February 23, 2022, mostly as a result of accusations that the China Initiative was racially profiling Chinese-American citizens and other residents of Chinese origin or ancestry. However, Republican lawmakers have called for reviving the program. The initiative led to a large exodus of influential Chinese-American scientists, many of whom decided to move to China.

Despite the official end of the China Initiative, investigations led by the National Institutes of Health as part of the initiative continued to impact researchers, resulting in the suicide of Jane Ying Wu on July 10, 2024, despite no official charges ever being brought forward against her. The NIH investigations resulted in the removal of over 250 (mostly Asian) scientists as of August 2024 for failing to disclose ties to China or breaking other rules. However the investigations have been criticized as biased and rigged in favor of NIH and the universities involved while providing little to no guidance on what or how to disclose the necessary information.

== Origin ==
The China Initiative was launched to prosecute scientific researchers and academics affiliated with China. It was set in motion by the Department of Justice (DOJ) under then-US President Donald Trump's first Attorney General Jeff Sessions in November 2018, with the goal of preventing industrial espionage. The China Initiative was one of Sessions' last actions as the official Attorney General of the US, in which the DOJ promised aggressive pursuit of Chinese commercial theft. Trump and his administration believed that China was using researchers and students to steal American technological innovations. The program gained momentum amidst rising tensions between the US and China due to trade wars and related tariff exchanges.

The DOJ maintains that there is no strict definition of what a China Initiative case is, but most of the cases involve researchers who failed to disclose Chinese funding on grant applications and many involve professors at US institutions. Despite the initiative's goal of combating espionage, only three out of fifty unsealed China Initiative cases alleged that secrets had been handed to Chinese agents as of 2021.

== End ==
Academic Andrew B. Kenney writes that after 2018, the initiative contributed to an outflow of Chinese-descended scientific talent from U.S. universities.

On 23 February 2022, the DOJ announced that it was ending the China Initiative, largely due to "perceptions that it unfairly painted Chinese Americans and United States residents of Chinese origin as disloyal." Assistant Attorney General for National Security Matthew Olsen said the decision did not mean the DOJ was abandoning its response to the threat posed by China, but rather that it wanted to pursue that goal differently. According to Olsen, the DOJ will continue to combat threats posed by the Chinese government; it will also continue to pursue the cases begun under the program.

The China Initiative cases typically involved lying or omitting information on disclosure forms. Some cases resulted in convictions, such as those of Charles Lieber (who was found guilty of making false statements to federal officials and filing false tax returns) and Meyya Meyyappan (a NASA scientist who pled guilty to making false statements to federal officials). Others have been reined in or abandoned, like that of Gang Chen, or defeated in a trial like Anming Hu's. The suicide of Jane Ying Wu from Northwestern University is reported to have been caused by the impact of the China initiative. A review of existing cases was conducted and the DOJ is "comfortable with where those cases are."

== Aftermath ==
Although the China Initiative has officially ended, the "climate of fear and anxiety" has not dissipated, and scientists are being pressured in other ways, according to sources reported by the scientific journal Nature in February 2023. Universities have become more active in "assisting investigations and pursuing potential wrongdoing". Gang Chen states that "The government has not done enough" to allay concerns and "It has only intensified". Jenny Lee, a social scientist at the University of Arizona, states that the end of the China Initiative provided the illusion that scientists of Chinese descent would receive a reprieve from scrutiny, but the "chilling effect" is still present and the US government has continued to adopt policies and positions perpetuating the narrative that scientists from China are spies. In a survey published in February 2023, a link was found between fear of racial profiling and a desire among scientists to return to China.

Chinese American scientists who have been caught up in cases such as those involving Dr. Xiaoxing Xi and Gang Chen say that they are still afraid to do research or apply for federal funding, while Anming Hu has had trouble securing funding. Chen says that he fears the government would use the application forms against him as they did before. Xi sought damages for the harm he suffered as a result of his arrest, but his claims were dismissed in March 2022. He spends much of his time raising awareness of anti-Asian sentiment as well as following cases of scientists in similar situations. Both Xi and Hu had their team sizes reduced from before their cases, and Hu no longer takes on researchers and students from China to avoid risk. Chen also sought to avoid risk by switching research topics to those with less obvious commercial applications while avoiding contact with researchers and students from China. Hu claims that he would have progressed much further in his research level had he not been caught up in the China Initiative.

== Revival ==
Two bills introduced by Republicans that passed the House of Representatives on September 11, 2024, were described as reviving the China Initiative. The bills were part of "China Week", a House Republican-led effort to advance China-related legislation.

In January 2026, lawmakers abandoned a proposal to revive the China Initiative that had been considered in the U.S. House of Representatives.

Despite the official abandonment of a revived China Initiative, leading immigration lawyers and activists claim that the US government's crackdown on Chinese scientists and researchers has not only continued but also intensified to an extent not seen during the "China Initiative" of President Donald Trump's first term. According to former Assistant US Attorney Robert Fisher, "we are clearly in an era of China Initiative 2.0" and there has been a significant uptick in investigations involving China-linked academics, although they have not yet resulted in indictments or prosecutions. Since January 2025, Chinese academics have been subject to arrests and investigations involving search warrants for their homes and border stops and visa restrictions. The FBI arrested and charged several Chinese researchers at American universities, including the University of Michigan and Indiana University, for smuggling biological materials and hiding ties to Chinese state institutions. Indiana University researcher Youhuang Xiang was arrested on allegations that he smuggled samples of E coli bacteria into the US and concealed his membership in the Communist Party. His visa was revoked and he spent four months in detention before entering a guilty plea deal in April 2026 and was ordered deported to China. However, Indiana University Bloomington Association of University Professors (AAUP) disputes the government's smuggling allegation against Xiang. Xiang's colleagues claim that his actions were mischaracterized and constituted a "common and routine method of obtaining research samples". Justin Sadowsky, legal director at the Chinese-American Legal Defence Alliance, says that Xiang was imprisoned for four months "because he didn't disclose something on a customs form". In March 2026, semiconductor researcher Wang Danhao died at the University of Michigan shortly after he was questioned by US federal law enforcement.

Beyond executive action, a bipartisan consensus in Congress is driving the push to restrict research ties to China. Multiple bills have been introduced specifically targeting economic espionage and intellectual property theft in a framework mirroring the 2018 China Initiative. According to Clay Zhu, a California-based lawyer, unlike China Initiative 1.0, which focused on criminal prosecutions, enforcement has shifted to civil action that is quieter, more effective, and attracts less public attention. The result is an "atmosphere of fear, and the chilling effect has been working so far".

== Criticism ==
Shortly after its launch, the initiative was criticized from various perspectives for racial profiling and generating fear among Chinese-descended scientists at U.S. universities.

Under the China Initiative, the FBI opened thousands of investigations. In July 2021, six cases were dropped, and that September, the case of Anming Hu ended with his acquittal, revealing "law enforcement errors and prosecutorial overzealousness."

=== Ineffectiveness ===
According to a Bloomberg News analysis of the 50 indictments displayed on the China Initiative webpage, the program had not "been very successful at catching spies." Most of the cases listed by December 17, 2021, involved individual profiteering or career advancement by the accused, rather than state-directed spying. Despite this, many of these indictments portray the alleged crimes as for the benefit of China. Seton Hall University law professor Margaret Lewis described this as "a conflation of individual motives with a country's policy goals" that has led to the criminalization of "China-ness."

A plurality of the indictments, representing 38% of the cases, charged academic researchers and professors with fraud for failure to disclose relationships with Chinese educational institutions. None of those accused of fraud had been found to have spied for China, and nearly half of those cases had been dropped. Around 20% of the cases involved violations of US sanctions or illegal exports. A smaller percentage concern cyber intrusions attributed to China. Only one-fifth of the indictments are about economic espionage and most of them remain unresolved. Only three cases allege that secrets were transferred to Chinese agents. Andrew Lelling, a former US attorney in Boston, Massachusetts, explained that the number of cases regarding disclosure is large because espionage cases take longer to investigate.

Out of 77 known China Initiative cases, 19 involved scientists suspected of having participated in the Thousand Talents Plan, and within that group, 14 were accused of violation of research integrity standards due to failure to disclose all affiliations to Chinese entities on grant documentation. None of the 14 were accused of transferring American intellectual property to China. Of the 28 prosecutions brought forth under the China Initiative, only eight have resulted in convictions or guilty pleas. Only four were professors of Chinese descent, and none were convicted for espionage or theft. According to Mark Cohen, a law school fellow at the University of California, Berkeley, "The government is settling for charges that have little to do with technology."

Zhengdong Cheng was imprisoned for 13 months after being arrested in August 2020. In September 2022, he was convicted of two charges of making false statements. Despite his conviction, Science characterized Cheng as "the latest case to crumble under the Department of Justice's (DOJ's) China Initiative" because the majority of the nine counts of defrauding the government and making false statements charged against him were overturned. Cheng admitted to failure to disclose his work for Guangdong University of Technology and Southern University of Science and Technology during the NASA grant application process. He was sentenced to the 13 months of imprisonment he had already served since August 2020, a fine of $20,000, and a repayment of $86,876 to NASA.

Writing in 2024, The Economist stated that the China Initiative was a "largely unsuccessful attempt to root out Chinese spies from industry and academia."

=== Inconsistencies ===
Civil rights groups have pointed to inconsistencies in the DOJ's messaging on the China Initiative. An MIT Technology Review investigation found that the DOJ did not provide a clear definition of a China Initiative case or disclose how many cases it included. The lack of transparency, the investigation claims, makes it impossible to understand what exactly the program was, what its achievements were, and what the costs have been for those affected. According to Jeremy Wu of the APA Justice Task Force, without a precise definition of the boundaries and scope of the China Initiative, information could be manipulated and presented so as to fit the government's narrative.

Some cases that were publicly described as China Initiative cases were absent from the program's webpage, including that of MIT professor Gang Chen. Chen was accused of failure to disclose contracts, appointments, and awards from Chinese entities while taking federal grants from the Department of Energy. A letter to MIT president Leo Rafael Reif from 170 MIT faculty members claimed that this was not true and presented several refutations of the allegations against Chen. The MIT president asserted that the contract in question was between MIT and a Chinese university, the Southern University of Science and Technology (SUSTech), to provide MIT with $25 million over five years. MIT paid for Chen's legal defense. Prosecutors recommended dropping charges against Chen, and the US District Court dismissed the case in January 2022.

Other cases, including that of Cleveland Clinic researcher Qing Wang, were removed from the webpage after charges were dismissed. MIT Technology Review found that only 13 of 23 research integrity cases were listed on the webpage. Seven of those ended in dismissals and acquittals and were removed. Of the 12 cases involving theft of trade secrets or economic espionage, only 10 were listed, and seven were charged with only theft of trade secrets, but not espionage. Only one case charged both theft and espionage. MIT analysis showed that 17 cases and 39 defendants were removed from the China Initiative webpage, while two cases and five defendants were added.

On 19 November, two days after MIT Technology Review approached the DOJ with questions about the China Initiative, significant revisions were made to the China Initiative webpage. Some items were deleted while other items were added. A former DOJ official suggested the webpage may have been organized less clearly than warranted, given the scale and impact of the program. Some cases, such as one involving a turtle-smuggling ring (which was later removed), may have been added to it by mistake. According to the official, such errors may have been due to a new staff member's zeal in looking for cases with a "nexus to China."

=== FBI misconduct ===
The first prosecution of the China Initiative, the Trial of Anming Hu, resulted in a hung jury and mistrial in June 2021, and Hu's acquittal in September 2021. Anming Hu is an associate professor in the Department of Mechanical, Aerospace and Biomedical Engineering at the University of Tennessee, Knoxville (UTK). Hu was fired in 2020 pursuant to the case against him, and reinstated in 2022. He was charged with three counts of fraud and three counts of making false statements after 21 months of FBI surveillance failed to find any evidence of espionage.

In Hu's first trial, it was revealed that the FBI knowingly built a case based on false evidence, obtained Hu's university documents without a warrant, spied on Hu and his family, and attempted to coerce Hu to spy on China for the United States. The FBI agent in charge of the case, Kujtim Sadiku, did not believe that Hu was guilty of being involved with the Chinese military but gave a PowerPoint presentation to the UTK administration designed to make them think he was. According to Hu's defense lawyer, Sadiku wanted a case badly enough that he went forward with questionable evidence. UTK aided the FBI in their investigation by providing Hu's university documents without a warrant, concealing the investigation from him, misleading NASA, and suspending him without pay as soon as he was arrested. Meetings were conducted between Hu's bosses and the FBI, but it is unclear who authorized them; the FBI did not have any proof of wrongdoing by Hu when they entered UTK and did not have the legal authority to take records from his personnel files. Sadiku admitted that he was not familiar with many of the policies regarding grants which Hu was accused of abusing. One of the jurors described it as "the most ridiculous case" and said the charges against Hu were the result of "a series of plausible errors" on Hu's part, "a lack of support from [UTK], and ruthless ambition on behalf of the FBI." Afterward, Democratic Representatives Ted Lieu, Mondaire Jones, and Pramila Jayapal voiced concerns about Hu's prosecution and called on Justice Department Inspector General Michael E. Horowitz to investigate allegations of FBI misconduct.

Following the mistrial, the federal government announced that it would pursue a retrial, which ended with Hu's acquittal in September 2021. US District Judge Thomas A. Varlan dismissed the case, saying: "[E]ven viewing all the evidence in the light most favorable to the government, no rational jury could conclude that defendant acted with a scheme to defraud NASA." Casey Arrowood, who led the failed prosecution of Anming Hu, has been nominated by President Biden for U.S. Attorney General of the Eastern District of Tennessee. Asian American civil rights groups called on supporters to oppose the nomination, which has been described as an "affront to the Asian American, immigrant, and scientific communities." Hu said that instead of being punished, Arrowood is being rewarded, encouraging future cases such as his to happen again.

In the trial of Franklin Feng Tao, evidence used by the Department of Justice was obtained using a search warrant that was given on the basis of manufactured allegations against Tao. These allegations were provided to the FBI in 2019 by an ex-colleague who wanted to sabotage Tao's career. She believed she was not given sufficient credit as a co-author of a paper he worked on, and allegedly demanded $310,000 from him due to "spiritual hurts"; when Tao refused, she threatened to counterattack and report him to the FBI as a "tech spy." The co-author "used fake email accounts to levy the accusations and hacked into Tao's email, even during a meeting with FBI agents." With that information, the FBI obtained a search warrant. Although the spying accusations did not stick, according to the prosecution, Tao's emails contained a contract to teach in China. Tao's defense said he was only in job discussions and did not sign the contract or take the job, which did not constitute a violation of disclosure rules. On September 20, 2022, a federal judge threw out the three convictions of wire fraud against Tao but upheld one count of making a false statement. On July 11, 2024, Tao's conviction was overturned upon appeal.

The FBI also implemented threat awareness sessions at universities, circulating information singling out China as a threat and labeling students, faculty, and researchers as 'non-traditional collectors'.

=== National Institutes of Health involvement ===
Aside from public criminal prosecutions, there have also been university investigations prompted by the National Institutes of Health (NIH), which are considered a personnel matter and occur behind closed doors away from reporters. The targeted scientists have been reluctant to talk about their experiences. Of the 246 targeted scientists, 103 (42%) have lost their jobs since 2018, and a fifth of the targeted scientists have been banned from applying for NIH funding for up to four years, constituting a career-ending restriction for many of them. Only in 14 of the 246 cases did the investigations fail to find any evidence for the allegations, which have been cited as proof of NIH effectiveness. As of August 2024, more than 250 scientists (mostly Asian) have lost their jobs as a result of being identified for failing to disclose funding or research in China, or for breaking other rules. The investigations resulted in two indictments and three convictions in terms of legal outcomes, while 112 scientists lost their jobs.

However, some criticism has been levelled at the way NIH has conducted these investigation prompts. According to David Brenner of the University of California, San Diego (UCSD), when NIH told them there was a problem, it was assumed that they were always right and the problem needed to be fixed. According to Robin Cyr at the University of North Carolina, Chapel Hill (UNC), when a letter arrived from Michael Lauer, head of NIH's extramural research, it meant that "NIH thinks your faculty has wrongfully and willfully divulged intellectual property." Some of the targeted scientists commented that they had little idea that their job would be at risk or what the investigations were specifically about. After the initial contact and reply, most of them were told that they had two options: resign or be fired.

In 2018, Wuyuan Lu, a professor at the University of Maryland's Institute of Human Virology (IHV), was contacted by a senior university research administrator regarding his failure to "disclose outside research support, relevant affiliations and foreign components," as well as alleged use of his NIH grant to support work in China. Lu assumed this had to do with his acknowledgement of Chinese co-author contributions and the Chinese institutions that had funded them in sections of papers even though NIH grants were not used in any of their efforts. Lu stated that the opposite was true and that the Chinese funds and contributions, which not only IHV approved but also promoted in its newsletters, had benefited IHV's work. Lu said that he did not believe there was any conflict of interest and that even if he had, he "wouldn't have known where, how, and what to disclose due to lack of clear guidelines." After submitting this information, Lu was not contacted for another 15 months, after which he was told NIH required more information. NIH requested English and Mandarin copies of contracts Lu had signed with Chinese institutions, such as Shanghai Medical College, Fudan University. However, Lu responded that he could not provide what did not exist. Lu resigned in August 2020 and now works at Fudan.

NIH alleged that Yue Xiong, who worked on protein degradation at UNC, had comingled his NIH grant with Chinese institutions and that he had a contract with Fudan containing language regarding intellectual property rights. Xiong denied the allegations, which were never specifically listed, and said he did not remember signing a contract. Cyr stated that NIH would not accept an inconclusive investigation report and kept pushing to dig deeper to support their narrative. According to Brian Strahl, chair of the medical school's department of biochemistry and biophysics, he was repeatedly told that UNC's NIH grants worth almost $1 billion were jeopardized if Xiong was not immediately removed. On 27 May 2020, Xiong was told that he had two days to resign or be fired. He was told that if he fought the allegations, "things won't end well for you." Several of Xiong's colleagues sent letters to the chancellor to reverse the decision, but received no answer.

Kun-Liang Guan, a biochemist professor then at the University of Michigan, Ann Arbor (UM), worked with Xiong. He recalled that when he joined UCSD in 2007, his superiors "were fully aware and very supportive of the collaboration" and had even offered to set up a video conference link to facilitate communication with Fudan. In 2019, he was banned from applying for NIH funding for 2 years after UCSD decided he had violated its code of conduct by not disclosing research support from foreign sources. Guan's lab shrank substantially as a result.

Li Wang, a tenured professor at the University of Connecticut, Storrs (UConn), was removed and restricted from access to her research materials within a week of UConn receiving an email from NIH on 6 November 2018. Senior administrators then decided that the allegations of affiliations with Wenzhou Medical University and receiving a grant from another Chinese institution did not corroborate with the evidence. On 21 November, Radenka Maric, then vice president for research, contacted NIH and said that the grant had been awarded to a different Li Wang. The result of the investigation was not accepted. After further communications between NIH and UConn, a forensic image of Wang's laptop was obtained that appeared to contradict her statements. UConn decided to fire her, and Wang resigned on 19 September 2019. Wang filed a grievance, which was rejected, and then took up her case with the American Arbitration Association (AAA). AAA ruled in favor of Wang in November 2021 and ordered UConn to compensate Wang with $1.4 million for suspension and termination "without just cause." The ruling criticized UConn for its unfair investigation, relying on false evidence, and closed-mindedness. AAA's Peter Adomeit found that Wang "did not falsify any record or provide false information" and that the instances in which Wang's name appeared in applications were for research she was not directly involved in. Adomeit noted that the misuse of results from auditing Wang's laptop, which was conducted via visual inspection without metadata analysis, was particularly egregious.

In some cases, university investigations have been more zealous than even NIH required, such as was the case for UCSD's Xiang-Dong Fu. Fu was hired in 1992 and received tenure in 1998. In 2005, he became a visiting professor at Wuhan and was paid $1000 per month for the next three years. From 2012 to 2016, Fu also received a monthly income from the Thousand Talents program. According to Fu, his superior knew about these activities, but NIH banned him from applying for NIH grants for 4 years. Although NIH considered the penalty to be sufficient, UCSD continued the investigation and concluded in May 2021 that Fu had repeatedly violated the code of conduct for conflicts of commitment. Fu did not learn of the second investigation until July or receive documents for it until December, prior to which he was invited to reply but was not allowed to dispute the findings. In January 2022, Fu was told to resign or accept a 4-year unpaid suspension. More than 100 UCSD faculty members requested a lighter penalty and described the prosecution as "rigged to assure the University lawyers would win their case rather than have justice be served." UCSD did not respond and on 5 December 2022, Fu resigned.

In a panel discussion on the China Initiative and its aftermath hosted by the University of Michigan, several panelists accused universities of abandoning the accused scientists. According to Gang Chen, he was the exception because he actually received support from MIT. Peter Zeidenberg, the lawyer representing accused scientists and academics, said that in the majority of cases, universities distanced themselves from the accused professors. Rather than acknowledging their failure to provide proper guidance on disclosure or that they were aware of connections with China, the universities deflected blame onto the professors. Of the 255 professors investigated by the universities as instructed by NIH, 44% lost their jobs. Most of them were tenured professors. According to Ann Chih Lin, an associate professor and director of the Lieberthal-Rogel Center for Chinese Studies, universities encouraged the accused professors to resign due to fear that they would lose grant money and bring unwanted public scrutiny. Most professors involved in these cases quietly left to protect themselves and the universities.

Both Xiang-Dong Fu and Kun-Liang Guan eventually left for China. By the time Guan's suspension ended in 2021, his lab had shrunk considerably and he had stopped taking on new students because he could not support them. Guan expressed skepticism that any of NIH's targets were able to start their work again. After working in the US for over 30 years, Guan took on a full-time position at Westlake University in Hangzhou for research on the Hippo signaling pathway. Fu joined Westlake University in March 2023 to continue his research on degenerative diseases such as Parkinson's disease.

Jane Ying Wu, a researcher in neurology and genetics at Northwestern University, was the subject of an investigation by NIH. She was recruited in 2009 by the Thousand Talents Programme to help run a lab and train students at the Institute of Biophysics in Beijing. By 2010, Wu was collaborating with the Chinese Academy of Sciences’ Biophysics Institute, a research group based in Beijing. However, Wu's lawyer Kessler said that Northwestern's Feinberg School of Medicine said that this was "fine" at the time. It is uncertain if this was the trigger for the investigation. Wu was never charged or found to have committed a wrongdoing related to her research ties to China and the NIH ended its investigation in December 2023. According to Xiao-Fan Wang, a professor at Duke University, the investigation killed Wu's career. Despite having worked at Northwestern for almost 20 years, a lawsuit alleges that the university "limited the work of Dr. Wu, partly closed her lab space, broke up her research team, reassigned her grants to her white male faculty colleagues, and left her isolated". Allegedly, even after the investigation was closed, Northwestern cut her salary due to a lack of funding, increased the requirements needed for her to restore funding with only a limited chance to meet them, and refused to restore the grant that had been taken away from her. The complaint states that her department chair, Prof. Dimitri Krainc, contacted her with the information that Dr. Michael Lauer, then director of the NIH's Office of Extramural Research, had declared her to be in good standing with Northwestern. A few days later, in May 2024, Krainc announced that Feinberg was shutting down her lab, which was confirmed by Feinberg Dean Eric Neilson on May 13. The lawsuit alleges that Northwestern sent police to evict Wu from her office and led her away in handcuffs to be sent to Northwestern's mental institution. Krainc denied that he was involved in either the arrest or announcement of the closure of Wu's lab. The medical school where Wu had worked for about two decades removed her profile page while her publication and grant records were removed from the Northwestern Scholar website. Jane Wu committed suicide on July 10, 2024. Her lab was unoccupied for months after her death and when a faculty member inquired about Wu's death, Feinberg Dean Neilson related that she had died after a brief illness. However, the Cook County Medical Examiner's Office ruled that her death had been by a suicide.

=== Allegations of racial bias ===
According to advocacy groups, the prosecutions contributed to worsening US-China tensions and "a 71% rise in incidents of violence against Asian Americans from 2019 to 2020." Asian American advocacy groups described the China Initiative as a new chapter in Asian American history stretching back to the Chinese Exclusion Act, the internment of Japanese Americans, and the failed prosecution of Wen Ho Lee in the 1990s. The Committee of 100, a Chinese American advocacy group, characterized the term "non-traditional actors" used to describe researchers with links to China as a way to label Asian Americans as perpetual foreigners. The Committee published a report in September 2021 analyzing 190 economic espionage cases since 1996, which showed that defendants with Asian names faced double the likelihood of false accusations and harsher punishments if convicted. The report showed that over 50% of Chinese scientists and over 50% of Chinese American scientists have become increasingly fearful of working in the United States. An investigation by MIT Technology Review found that 90% of the individuals caught up in the China Initiative by December 2021 were of Chinese descent.

A poll by the Committee of 100 and the University of Arizona in summer 2021 found that four out of ten scientists of Chinese descent had recently considered leaving the U.S. out of fear of government surveillance. According to data gathered by Princeton University, Harvard University and the Massachusetts Institute of Technology, the number of U.S.-trained scientists of Chinese descent who dropped their U.S.-based affiliation for a Chinese one increased by 22 percent over the previous year to more than 1,400 in 2021, coinciding with the COVID-19 pandemic as well as the China Initiative. One Chinese mechanical-engineering professor from a top American university said he left for Hong Kong after more than two decades in the U.S. due to aging parents, the tense political environment in America, and his Chineseness putting other collaborating scientists at risk of scrutiny. Fields Medal winner Shing-Tung Yau, one of the highest profile departees, left for Tsinghua University in April 2022. Although he did not respond to a request for comment, he compared the academic environment in the U.S. to the Soviet Union in a speech to Harvard freshmen in September 2021. According to OECD data, China surpassed the US in net inflow of scientific authors in 2021, which OECD attributed to returning Chinese scientists. According to an online survey conducted between December 2021 and March 2022 by the Asian American Scholar Forum (AASF), based on a sample size of 1,229 Chinese American faculty members, 61% had intentions to relocate to another country, 35% felt unwelcome as a researcher in the US, 42% felt fearful of conducting research in the US, and 72% did not feel safe as a researcher in the US.

In January 2021, APA Justice, the Brennan Center for Justice and Asian Americans Advancing Justice called for the end of the China Initiative. Their letter to Joe Biden notes that John Charles Demers, assistant attorney general of the National Security Division, directed each of the 94 US Attorneys' districts to bring forth cases of Chinese espionage or theft without any apparent reason to believe that such crimes were being committed. As a consequence of the program's "pressure on grant makers, universities and research institutions to participate in racial, ethnic and national origin profiling," they claimed, discriminatory and stigmatizing investigations were conducted on people of Chinese descent.

More than 1,600 scholars and administrators from over 200 universities petitioned for the end of the program, which they claimed disproportionately targets researchers of Chinese origin. In September 2021, American Physical Society President Sylvester James Gates said the DOJ should move away from disclosure issues and rename the China Initiative in order to allay concerns over racial profiling. He called for the review of past cases for violations of due process and for the victims to be compensated for damage to their careers, and suggested the government give researchers a timespan in which to correct previous oversights in disclosure. At the same time, 177 Stanford University faculty members sent a letter to the DOJ with similar complaints. They wrote that the program does "not just affect the prosecuted faculty but affects many more university researchers who are targeted, investigated and feel threatened by inquiries initiated without prior evidence of significant wrongdoing."

Judy Chu, the U.S. representative for California's 27th congressional district since 2013, said "They have turned the China Initiative into an instrument for racial profiling" and that "They have turned it into a means to terrorize Chinese scientists and engineers. Something has gone dramatically wrong." Thu Nguyen, the executive director of OCA-Asian Pacific American Advocates, said fears of racial profiling drove some talented scientists to look for work back in China.

Merrick Garland, the new United States attorney general under the Biden administration since March 2021, pledged to review the program. In October, Garland said that there was no place for discrimination, but confirmed that new investigations were being opened on a daily basis. Government spokesman Wyn Hornbuckle wrote in an email that cases were based on conduct and not ethnicity. The FBI claims that there is nothing racially motivated about its China Initiative investigations. In February 2022, more than 150 University of Pennsylvania faculty members addressed an open letter to Attorney General Garland, "urging the U.S. Department of Justice to overturn the 'China Initiative' which they allege disproportionately targets researchers of Chinese descent."

=== Legal commentary ===
The prosecutor in the first announced China Initiative case, John Hemann, said the program had "gone off the rails" and "morphed into something that's completely away from what the point of what this exercise was in the first place." Hemann characterized the problem the China Initiative addressed as political and economic in nature, not one which could be resolved with criminal prosecutions. He later defended a medical researcher, Chen Song, who was charged with visa fraud. Chen was accused of misrepresenting whether she still served the People's Liberation Army. Her case was dropped in July 2021.

Peter Toren, another former federal prosecutor, suggested that charging scientists with failing to report contracts or income from other sources, when they may be unaware of their obligations, might not be the best approach. He urged scientists to learn the dangers of theft but also said that they should understand and advocate for their rights. He recommended seeking professional help before getting caught up in an investigation and to not automatically assume an FBI agent is acting in their best interests.

Andrew Lelling, a former US attorney in Boston, questioned whether the China Initiative was proportional to the amount of espionage actually occurring. He said that an appropriate response to China would not be "just prosecuting people," and that "nuanced foreign policy" would not utilize only the Justice Department. Lelling called for the elimination of certain parts of the program.

== See also ==
- Anti-Chinese sentiment in the United States
- Human rights in the United States
- Qian Xuesen
- Yellow Peril
