= Feng Tao =

Feng Tao may refer to:

- Feng Dao (Feng Tao in Wade–Giles, 882–954), Chinese inventor, printer, and politician
- Franklin Feng Tao, Chinese-American chemical engineer
- Feng Tao (footballer) (born 1983), Chinese footballer
