= Jane Ying Wu =

Chinese American neuroscientist (1963-2024)

- 吴瑛
- Born: September 23, 1963; Hefei, Anhui, China
- Died: July 10, 2024 (aged 60); Chicago, Illinois, U.S.
- Education: Shanghai Medical University (BMed); Stanford University (PhD)
- Spouse: Rao Yi
- Scientific career
- Fields: Neurology
- Workplaces: Washington University in St. Louis; Northwestern University
- Thesis: Molecular studies of hepatitis B virus (1991)
- Doctoral advisor: William S. Robinson
- Website: Faculty page (archived); Wu Lab page (archived)

Jane Ying Wu (Chinese: 吴瑛; September 23, 1963 – July 10, 2024) was a Chinese-born American neuroscientist who served as professor of neurology at the Feinberg School of Medicine of Northwestern University.

Wu died by suicide at her home in Chicago in 2024 after the forced closure of her laboratory at Northwestern University, where she had served as professor for nearly two decades. Her research area was in the field of post-transcriptional gene regulation and its involvement in human pathogenesis.

== Early life and education ==
Wu was born in 1963 in the city of Hefei, Anhui, China. She lived with her grandmother while her parents were in a labor camp.

Wu attended Shanghai Medical University for undergraduate studies and graduated with a Bachelor of Medicine in 1986. She traveled to the United States for graduate studies and received a Doctor of Philosophy in cancer biology from the Stanford University School of Medicine in 1991. Her doctoral dissertation was titled, Molecular studies of hepatitis B virus, and her doctoral advisor was William S. Robinson. Wu's thesis was "[d]edicated to the memory of martyrs of June Fourth, 1989".

== Career ==
After receiving her doctorate, Wu conducted postdoctoral research at Harvard University. Wu spent ten years at Washington University School of Medicine, where she served first as an assistant professor and then as an associate professor in pediatrics, molecular biology, and pharmacology.

In 2005, Wu joined Northwestern University where her research concentrated on two closely related biological processes, RNA splicing and the role of regulatory RNA-binding proteins. She led a neurology and genetics laboratory at the Feinberg School of Medicine. By 2007, she was the Charles Louis Mix Professor of Neurology at Northwestern University Feinberg School of Medicine. The same year, she was elected to the American Society for Clinical Investigation.

In 2009, Wu was invited "by the Chinese government under the Thousand Talents Plan to help run a lab and train students" at the Institute of Biophysics, Chinese Academy of Sciences.

=== Research ===
Her research interests centered on post-transcriptional gene regulation and its involvement in human diseases. She focused on pre-mRNA splicing, a crucial process in eukaryotic gene expression that played a significant role in genetic diversity. Defects in pre-mRNA splicing were linked to the development of numerous human disorders. Wu's research team investigated the mechanisms that regulated pre-mRNA splicing and alternative splicing in genes essential for cell death and neuronal function. They specifically examined how splicing defects contributed to neurodegenerative diseases such as frontotemporal dementia and retinal degeneration. Additionally, Wu explored the fundamental processes involved in tumor development and metastasis. Her discovery of how a neuronal migration signal modulated chemokine activity provided new insights into chemokine regulation, uncovering a conserved mechanism that controlled cell migration across various cell types. Her lab also studied the role of neuronal guidance cues in tumor metastasis and developed new approaches to address inflammatory diseases.

== Personal life ==
Wu met her husband Rao Yi at Shanghai Medical University, where Wu was an undergraduate medical student (graduated in 1986) and Rao was a master's student (dropped out in 1985).

=== Death ===
As a researcher in neurology and genetics at Northwestern University, Wu was the subject of an investigation by NIH related to the China Initiative. She was recruited in 2009 by the Thousand Talents Programme to help run a lab and train students at the Institute of Biophysics in Beijing. However it is uncertain if this was the trigger for the investigation. She was never charged or found to have committed a wrongdoing related to her research ties to China. NIH cleared her of any wrongdoing. According to Xiao-Fan Wang, a professor at Duke University, the investigation killed Wu's career. Despite having worked at Northwestern for almost 20 years, a lawsuit alleges that the university "limited the work of Dr. Wu, partly closed her lab space, broke up her research team, reassigned her grants to her white male faculty colleagues, and left her isolated". Allegedly, even after the investigation was closed, Northwestern cut her salary due to lack of funding, increased the requirements needed for her to restore funding with only a limited chance to meet them, and refused to restore the grant that had been taken away from her. In May 2024, Northwestern shut down her lab. The lawsuit alleges that Northwestern sent police to evict Wu from her office and led her away in handcuffs to be sent to Northwestern's mental institution. The medical school where Wu had worked for about two decades removed her profile page while her publication and grant records were removed from the Northwestern Scholar website. Jane Wu committed suicide on July 10, 2024.
