= ScienceNet =

Chinese scientific virtual community and blog

ScienceNet (科学网)
- Website type: Virtual Community
- Available in: Simplified Chinese
- Headquarters: Beijing, China
- Owner: Science Times Media Group (STMG)
- Website: www.sciencenet.cn
- Commercial: No
- Launched: January 2007; 19 years ago

ScienceNet (Chinese: 科学网) is a science virtual community and science blog. It was launched by Science Times Media Group (STMG) and is supported by the Chinese Academy of Sciences, the Chinese Academy of Engineering, and the National Natural Science Foundation of China with the mission of establishing global Chinese science community. Since its launch on January 18, 2007, a total of 5,553 scientists and graduate students have blogged on ScienceNet.

According to the editorial board of ScienceNet, it has been ranked first among Chinese science websites.

== Bloggers ==
- Yu-Chi Ho, Professor, Harvard and Tsinghua University
- Rao Yi, Professor and Dean, School of Life Sciences, Peking University
- Shi Yigong, Professor and Dean, Department of Biological Sciences and Biotechnology, Tsinghua University
- Lu Bai, Vice President of Biology R&D center, GlaxoSmithKline
- Wang Hongfei, Chief Scientist, Pacific Northwest National Laboratory
- Li Xiaowen, Director, Remote Sensing and GIS Research Center, Beijing Normal University
- Wu Yishan, Chief Engineer, Institute of Scientific and Technical Information of China
- Cao Cong, Senior research associate, State University of New York

== History ==
- January 18, 2007: official launch
- April 2008: the selecting blog articles of 2007 year on ScienceNet was published — 《智者不惑》
- September–December 2008: held the first national youth science blogs competition
- July 2009: the selecting blog articles of 2008 year on ScienceNet was published — 《流动的科学》
- November 2009: the selecting blog articles of Yu-Chi Ho on ScienceNet was published — 《科学人生纵横》
- April–June 2001: held the second national youth science blogs competition
- April 2010: ScienceNet opened an account on Sina Weibo

== Influences ==
Rao Yi and Cui Keming debated on hiring policies by posting their opinions on ScienceNet and was further featured by the Editorial of magazine Nature.

Professor Chen Yongjiang posted a series of articles on ScienceNet to uncover the academic fraud case happened in Xi'an Jiaotong University. The main criminal Li Lianshen was finally fired by the university after the following report of State Media.
