= Rao Yi =

Chinese neurobiologist

- 饶毅
- Born: 1962 (age 63–64); Fuzhou, Jiangxi, China
- Education: Jiangxi Medical College (BS); Shanghai Medical University (MS); University of California, San Francisco (PhD)
- Spouse: Jane Ying Wu
- Scientific career
- Fields: Molecular neurobiology
- Workplaces: Capital Medical University (President); Peking University (Dean of School of Life Sciences); Harvard University (Helen Hay Whitney Fellow); Washington University in St. Louis; Northwestern University
- Thesis: Molecular and genetic analyses of cellular communication in drosophila neurogenesis (1991)
- Doctoral advisor: Yuh-Nung Jan; Lily Jan

Chinese name
- Simplified Chinese: 饶毅
- Traditional Chinese: 饒毅
Transcriptions
Standard Mandarin
- Hanyu Pinyin: Ráo Yì
- Website: mgv.pku.edu.cn

Rao Yi (Chinese: 饶毅; born 1962) is a Chinese neurobiologist.

Rao received a PhD degree from the University of California, San Francisco. He held a Helen Hay Whitney fellowship at Harvard University and was on the faculty of Washington University in St. Louis and Northwestern University before moving back to China to take up the deanship of Peking University's School of Life Sciences in 2007. He is currently Director and Principal Investigator of IDG/McGovern Institute for Brain Research at Peking University.

He took office as the President of the Capital Medical University on 25 June 2019.

== Personal life and education ==
Rao was born in Jiangxi in 1962. In college, he was friends with Mei Lin, who also became a neurobiologist later. In graduate school at Shanghai Medical University, Rao was roommates with Lu Bai, now also an eminent neurobiologist. At SMU, his interests began to turn to molecular neurobiology.

In 1985, Rao enrolled as a graduate student at the University of California, San Francisco. He describes the atmosphere at UCSF as far more exciting than that to which he had previously been exposed in China. His advisors were Yuh-Nung and Lily Jan. He discovered the big brain gene, which is required for a binary decision in neural development: to form a neuron or an epidermal cell. He defended his doctoral thesis on molecular and genetic analysis of intercellular communication in Drosophila neurogenesis at UCSF in 1991.

== Career and research interests ==
After graduating from UCSF, Rao received a Helen Hay Whitney fellowship for postdoctoral research in the Department of Biochemistry and Molecular Biology at Harvard University, where he worked on embryonic induction in vertebrates. He then joined the faculty of Washington University in St. Louis in 1994, where he established his first laboratory. He moved to Northwestern University in Chicago in 2004, and was named the university's first Elsa A. Swanson Research Professor in 2006. Other honours he received include the Esther A. and Joseph Klingenstein Fellowship in Neuroscience in 2000, as well as the Charles B. Wilson Brain Tumor Research Excellence Award in Neuroscience. He also served on the editorial board of The Journal of Neuroscience, Developmental Biology, Developmental Brain Research, Neuroscience Research. He moved back to China in 2007 to be the dean of Peking University's School of Life Sciences. He stepped down from the deanship in 2013.

In 1997, Rao discovered that a single origin gave rise to two eyes in frog and chicken embryos. In 1999, he demonstrated that the secreted protein encoded by the Slit gene was a repellent guidance cue for axons. He has later found that Slit could repel migrating neurons, chemotactic leukocytes and brain tumor cells. Rao has uncovered major components in the signal transduction pathways for Slit and the axon attractant Netrin..

In China, Rao switched to studies of molecular and cellular mechanisms of behaviors and has found neurotransmitters required for aggression and courtship in Drosophila and the mouse.

== Science funding reform advocacy ==
Rao Yi is one of the leading reformers of science and education in China. He participated directly in the reform or establishment of five institutes and writes about science and culture for a wide audience.

While in the U.S., he began his involvement with academia in China, working with Lu Bai and Mei Lin to establish a joint lab in Shanghai in 1995. They then joined Mu-ming Poo of UC Berkeley on a proposal to establish the Institute of Neuroscience in Shanghai in 1999. In 2002, Rao and Uli Schwarz of the Max Planck Institute established the Shanghai Institute of Advanced Studies at the Chinese Academy of Sciences, for which they served as co-directors till 2005. In 2004, Xiaodong Wang, Xingwang Deng and Rao established the National Institute of Biological Sciences, for which Rao served as an associate director for Academic Affairs until 2009.

In 2004, Rao, Bai Lu and Chenlu Tsou advocated for changes in China's system of grants for scientific research, questioning the involvement of bureaucrats and the emphasis on connections rather than merit in a paper (Rao, Lu & Tsou 2004) which suggested alternatives to the Mid-to-Long Term Plan of Science and Technology. He levelled sharper criticisms in a 2010 Science editorial with fellow ex-American Shi Yigong (Shi & Rao 2010) which drew widespread focus to corruption and embezzlement from research funds. The Ministry of Science and Technology disputed Shi and Rao's claims, stating that there was "zero tolerance" for misconduct.

The year after the article, both Rao and Shi failed to be named to the Chinese Academy of Sciences in the first round of voting among members in its biennial membership elections. Rao and Shi's failure to be named among the 145 candidates on the longlist for membership was widely believed to be tied to their criticisms, and in response Rao announced in a post on ScienceNet.cn that he would refuse to stand for election to the CAS again in the future.

Since 2007, Rao successfully established the tenure track system in the School of Life Sciences, with international peer reviews of academic merits as the important criteria for hiring, promotion and firing.

In 2012, Rao and Shi Yigong established PKU-Tsinghua Center for Life Sciences, with Rao serving as the Director of Peking part and Shi as the Director of the Tsinghua part.

In 2013, Rao established the PKU-IDG/McGovern Institute for Brain Research at Peking University and serves as its Founding Director.

In 2018, Rao established the Chinese Institute for Brain Research (CIBR) at Beijing and serves as its Founding Director.

In 2019, Rao was appointed the President of the Capital Medical University.

== Other views ==
In 2009, two years after his return to China, Rao renounced his U.S. citizenship; in a written statement to the U.S. embassy in Beijing during that process, he criticized the US government for its behaviors after the September 11th attacks.

Rao went on to a major Chinese TV program in 2016 and denounced Donald Trump. Rao had failed to obtain a visa to visit the US since 2016. A large number of Chinese viewed Rao as ridiculous in denouncing Trump in 2016. However, this turned by 2020 when most Chinese were also against Trump.

Rao is a supporter of genetically modified food, and believes that even if China opposes GM food, it will simply result in the collapse of local companies while foreign companies strengthen their hold on the industry.

Rao came under criticism from both Kuomintang and Democratic Progressive Party politicians in Taiwan for his private letter relating to the addresses of Beijing and Taiwan researchers involved in scientific collaboration. In a 2011 letter to National Science Council head Lee Lou-chuang, Rao proposed that a paper in which Peking University researchers had collaborated with National Tsing Hua University researchers in Taiwan identify each institution's location without the use of political terms "People's Republic" or "Republic". This would lead to Peking University's location being listed as "Beijing, China", and NTHU as located in "Taipei, China". However, Taiwan's National Science Council requires researchers it funds to list their location either as "Taiwan" or "Taiwan, Republic of China". The director of Taiwan's National Science Council did not reply to Rao's letter, but revealed it to the general public of Taiwan instead. KMT caucus whip Chao Li-yun (趙麗雲) conveyed the KMT's condemnation of Rao for his suggestion, while Chen Ting-fei of the DPP criticised President Ma Ying-jeou for "submitting to humiliation" by not speaking up about the matter.

== Selected works ==
=== Scientific research ===
- Molecular and genetic analyses of cellular communication in drosophila neurogenesis. Ph.D. dissertation. University of California, San Francisco. 1991. OCLC 26388919.
- Rao Y, Li R, Zhang D (June 2013). "A drug from poison: how the therapeutic effect of arsenic trioxide on acute promyelocytic leukemia was discovered". Sci China Life Sci. 56 (6): 495–502. doi:10.1007/s11427-013-4487-z. PMID 23645104.

=== Opinion and popular press ===
- With Lu Bai and Tsou Chen-Lu: 中国科技需要的根本转变：从传统人治到竞争优胜体制——中长期规划将留下优秀遗产、还是错失良机 [A Fundamental Transition from Rule-by-Man to Rule-by-Merit: What Will Be the Legacy of the Mid-to-Long Term Plan of Science and Technology?]. Nature (in Chinese). 432 (Suppl): A12. 18 November 2004.
- 饶议科学 [Rao Yi's science]. 上海科技教育出版社 [Shanghai Science Education Publishing House]. 2009. ISBN 9787542848444. OCLC 547750331.
- With Shi Yigong: Shi, Y.; Rao, Y. (3 September 2010). "China's Research Culture". Science. 329 (5996): 1128. Bibcode:2010Sci...329.1128S. doi:10.1126/science.1196916. PMID 20813923.
