= Shi Ping =

Chinese academic, politician and supercentenarian (1911–2024)

- 施平
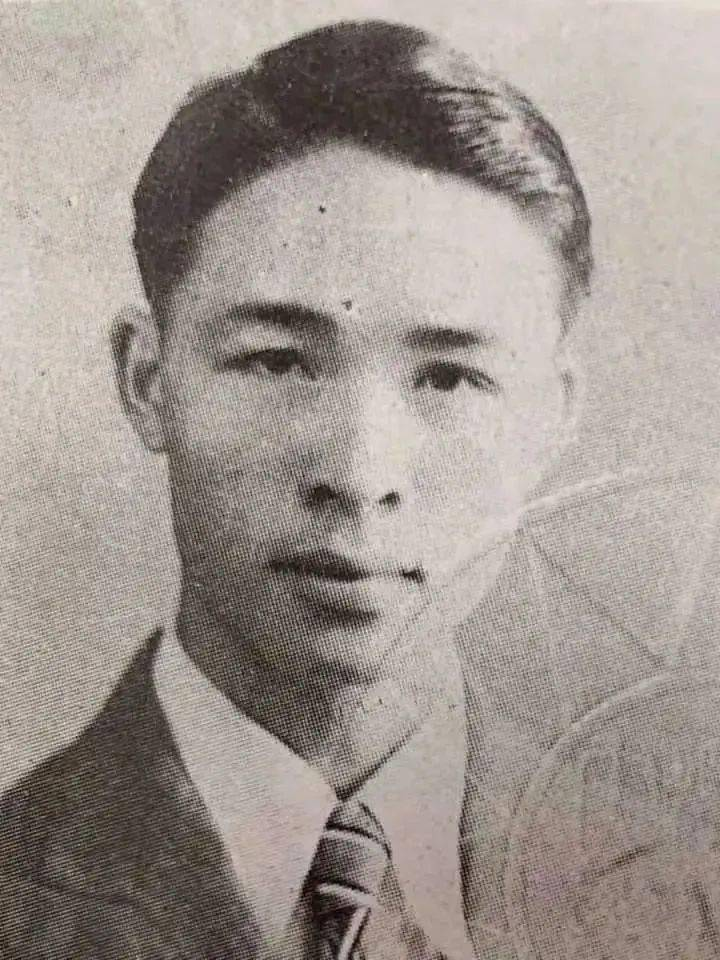
- Shi, c. 1937–1938

Vice President of China Agricultural University
- In office 1953–1960

Secretary of East China Normal University
- In office 1978–1983

Secretary General of Shanghai Municipal People's Congress of the Chinese Communist Party
- In office 1983–1985

Personal details
- Born: Shi Eryi; 1 November 1911 Dayao County, Yunnan, Qing dynasty
- Died: 29 June 2024 (aged 112 years, 241 days) Jing'an District, Shanghai, China
- Party: Chinese Communist Party
- Spouse: Yang Lin (m. 1934; died 1935)
- Children: 1
- Relatives: Shi Yigong (grandson)
- Known for: World's oldest living man (2 April – 29 June 2024); First Chinese supercentenarian to be verified; Oldest verified Chinese person ever

Shi Ping (Chinese: 施平; born Shi Eryi (Chinese: 施尔宜); 1 November 1911 – 29 June 2024) was a Chinese academic, political administrator, and supercentenarian. He is posthumously recognised as having been the world's oldest verified living man from the death of Venezuela's Juan Vicente Pérez on 2 April 2024, until his own death.

== Biography ==
Shi was born Shi Eryi (Chinese: 施尔宜) on 1 November 1911, in Dayao, Yunnan, in Imperial China. Between February and August 1931, he studied at the University of Nanking, before moving to Zhejiang University in September of the same year, where he studied until June 1936.

He joined the Chinese Communist Party (CCP) in 1938, and joined as a soldier and fought with the New Fourth Army in 1941 during the Second Sino-Japanese War. At the time of his death, he was the most senior surviving member of the New Fourth Army.

Shi became vice president of Beijing Agricultural University in 1953, holding the post until 1960.

From 1978 to 1983, he was the CCP committee secretary for East China Normal University. Shi served as secretary general of Shanghai Municipal People's Congress from 1983 to 1985.

== Personal life and death ==
Shi Ping met his wife, Yang Lin, at Zhejiang University. At the time, Yang was one of the key organizers of revolutionary student movements in Hangzhou. She was arrested and imprisoned by the Nationalist government under accusations of her being a Communist Party member. She died in prison on 23 January 1935, just 18 days after giving birth to their son, Shi Huailin. Shi Huailin became a professor at Zhengzhou Institute of Technology and died in a car accident in September 1987. Shi's grandson is Shi Yigong, a biophysicist and the president of Westlake University in Hangzhou.

Shi died at Huadong Hospital on 29 June 2024, at the age of 112 years, 241 days. He had been the world's oldest verified living man following the death of 114-year-old Juan Vicente Pérez of Venezuela on 2 April 2024, though his age claim was not verified until after his death. Upon his validation in August 2024, he became the first ever verified supercentenarian from China. Shi was the last known verified living person to be born during the Qing dynasty. Following Shi's death, then 111-year-old John Tinniswood of the United Kingdom became the world's oldest man.
