= Ying Sun (mechanical engineer) =

Chinese-American mechanical engineer

Ying Sun is a Chinese-American mechanical engineer whose research interests include interface and colloid science, thermal fluids, and multiphase flow. She is currently the Dean's Professor and Department Chair of the Mechanical Engineering and Engineering Science Department at University of North Carolina at Charlotte.

== Education and career ==
Sun graduated from Tsinghua University in 1998 with a bachelor's degree in thermal engineering. She went to the University of Iowa for graduate study in mechanical engineering, earning a master's degree in 2001 and completing her Ph.D. in 2006.

She began her academic career as an assistant professor at Binghamton University; Zhiting Tian, a master's student at Binghamton at that time, has named her as a mentor. She moved to Drexel University in 2009, where she became Hess Family Endowed Chair Professor. In 2019 she began a term as a program director at the National Science Foundation, in the Thermal Transport Processes Program. She served as the Department Head in the Department of Mechanical and Materials Engineering at the University of Cincinnati in 2022, where she was also the Herman Schneider Professor. In 2025, she started her current position at University of North Carolina at Charlotte.

== Recognition ==
Sun was elected as an ASME Fellow in 2020. In 2024, she was elected as a Fellow of the American Physical Society (APS), after a nomination from the APS Division of Fluid Dynamics, "for seminal contributions to both the development of novel algorithms for multiscale modeling of interfacial and multiphase flows, from the atomistic and mesoscale to the continuum level, and experimental methods with multiple forms of microscopy for characterizing short-lived interfacial dynamics".
