= Gang Chen (engineer) =

Chinese American mechanical engineer

- 陈刚
- Born: June 1964 (age 62); Nanzhang, Hubei, China
- Citizenship: United States (2000–present); China (1964–2000)
- Education: Huazhong University of Science and Technology (BE, ME); University of California, Berkeley (PhD)
- Known for: Nanotechnology; Thermoelectricity; Nanoscale heat transfer
- Spouse: Cai Guohong (蔡国红)
- Children: 2
- Awards: American Academy of Arts and Sciences Fellow; Thomson Reuters Highly Cited Researcher; Tsinghua University honorary professor; World Technology Award; Academia Sinica academician; American Physical Society fellow; University of California, Berkeley Springer Professor; National Academy of Engineering member; American Association for the Advancement of Science fellow; Massachusetts Institute of Technology Carl Richard Soderberg Professor; American Society of Mechanical Engineers Heat Transfer Memorial Award; American Society of Mechanical Engineers fellow
- Scientific career
- Fields: Nanotechnology; Heat transfer
- Workplaces: Massachusetts Institute of Technology (2001–present); University of California, Los Angeles (1996–2001); Duke University (1993–1997)
- Thesis: Microscale thermal phenomena in optical and optoelectronic thin-film devices (1993)
- Doctoral advisor: Chang-Lin Tien
- Doctoral students: Zhiting Tian
- Website: meche.mit.edu/gchen2

Gang Chen (Chinese: 陈刚; pinyin: Chén Gāng) is a Chinese-born American mechanical engineer and nanotechnologist. At the Massachusetts Institute of Technology (MIT), he is currently the Carl Richard Soderberg Professor of Power Engineering. He served as head of the Department of Mechanical Engineering at MIT from July 2013 to June 2018. He directs the Solid-State Solar-Thermal Energy Conversion Center, an energy frontier research center formerly funded by the United States Department of Energy. He was elected as a member of the National Academy of Engineering in 2010 and of the National Academy of Sciences in 2023.

In January 2021, Chen was charged by the United States Department of Justice under the now abolished China Initiative, for allegedly failing to disclose connections to several Chinese educational programs when submitting a federal grant application. His arrest prompted protests by other academics including MIT's then president Leo Rafael Reif and editorials in the scientific press over the United States government targeting of Chinese American professors. One year later, federal prosecutors dropped the charges after evidence showed that the disclosures in question were not actually required by the federal government.

== Education ==
Gang Chen received a Bachelor of Engineering in 1984 and a Master of Engineering in 1987, both in power engineering from the Huazhong University of Science and Technology.

He received a Doctor of Philosophy in mechanical engineering from the University of California, Berkeley in 1993.

== Research career ==
Chen was an assistant professor at Duke University from 1993 to 1997 and a tenured associate professor at the University of California, Los Angeles from 1996 to 2001. He joined the Massachusetts Institute of Technology in 2001. Chen has made major contributions to thermoelectricity, nanotechnology, and thermal engineering.

In 2022, Chen and a team of colleagues discovered that cubic boron arsenide is a highly effective semiconductor, a discovery with potentially important applications in electronics.

== Awards and honors ==
Chen is a recipient of the K.C. Wong Education Foundation fellowship and the John Simon Guggenheim Foundation fellowship (2002-3). He has received the NSF Young Investigator Award, an R&D 100 award (2008), and the ASME Heat Transfer Memorial Award (2008). He is a fellow of the American Association for the Advancement of Science, the American Physical Society, and the American Society of Mechanical Engineers. In 2010, he was elected a member of the National Academy of Engineering for contributions to heat transfer at the nanoscale and to thermoelectric energy conversion technology. He was elected as an academician of Academia Sinica in the Division of Engineering Science in 2014. In 2014, he also received the Nukiyama Memorial Award of the Heat Transfer Society of Japan. He was elected as a Member of the American Academy of Arts and Sciences in April 2018, and of the National Academy of Sciences in 2023.

== Federal indictment and ensuing controversy ==
On January 14, 2021, Chen was arrested by the Federal Bureau of Investigation and charged with failing to disclose alleged connections to several educational programs in China in filing a U.S. Department of Energy grant application, as well as omissions in his IRS filings. Chen was charged with failing to report contacts with Chinese entities to the U.S. Department of Energy, leading to an allegation of wire fraud, with failing to file a foreign bank account report (FBAR) in some tax years, and with making false statements on his tax returns. The charge of wire fraud was based on alleged omissions from federal grant proposal form (Current and pending support) that was submitted electronically.

In response to these charges, the President of MIT, L. Rafael Reif wrote to the MIT community stating: "For all of us who know Gang, this news is surprising, deeply distressing and hard to understand." On January 21, 2021, more than 100 MIT Faculty submitted a letter to MIT President Reif, protesting Professor Chen's arrest and citing specific "deeply flawed and misleading statements" in the criminal complaint ending with "we are all Gang Chen". The letter was tweeted next morning.

The FBI documents alleged that Chen received $19 million from China's Southern University of Science and Technology (SUSTech). On January 22, 2021, MIT's president released a second statement pointing out that these funds went to not Chen, but to MIT itself to support a departmental research collaboration with SUSTech which Chen simply directed on MIT's behalf.

The indictment provoked strong criticism. Many more MIT faculty signed the protest letter questioning merits of the FBI's case and stating: "The defense of Gang Chen is the defense of the scientific enterprise that we all hold dear." An opinion article in Bloomberg remarked: "Ever since the Nazis drove Europe's greatest minds into exile, U.S. science has flourished by attracting talent from overseas." An MIT researcher stated that: "The [Dept. of Justice's] China Initiative fundamentally misunderstands both research and international collaboration."

On January 14, 2022, the Wall Street Journal reported that federal prosecutors had recommended dropping the criminal charges against Professor Chen. The same day, The Washington Post reported that the DOE forms had not required Chen to disclose his connections to Chinese educational programs, undercutting the basis of the federal charges. On January 20, 2022, federal prosecutors filed a motion to drop the charges "in the interests of justice", and the US District Court dismissed the case.

In a New York Times interview published after his exoneration, Chen described the experience as "traumatic and deeply disillusioning ... 'I didn't do anything wrong'". After the charges were filed he was banned from the MIT campus and from contacting MIT employees. The postdocs he worked with were moved to other labs. He no longer had a research group or funding, and until the charges were dropped he worked alone on other topics. He returned to his MIT office the day after the case was dismissed.

== See also ==
- Franklin Feng Tao, Chinese-American academic involved in a similar investigation
