= Chongqing Normal University =

University in Chongqing, China

- 重庆师范大学
- Former names: East Sichuan Normal School
- Motto: 厚德、笃学、砺志、创新(Simplified Chinese)
- Motto in English: Virtue, Research, Ambition, Innovation
- Type: Public
- Established: 1954; 72 years ago
- Affiliations: NBACPWCC
- President: Meng Dongfang
- Council Chair: Zeng Li
- Academic staff: ~2,000 faculty members (and >1,000 faculty members with high professional titles or Ph.D.)
- Students: ~30,000 (Fall 2021)
- Undergraduates: ~24,000 (Fall 2021)
- Postgraduates: ~5,000 (Fall 2021)
- Location: Shapingba District, Chongqing, China; 29°36′54″N 106°17′57.84″E
- Campus: 443 acres; Multiple Sites
- Flower: Camellia
- Colours: BlueRed
- Website: cqnu.edu.cn

Chongqing Normal University (Chinese: 重庆师范大学) is one of the major public research universities in Chongqing, China. Founded in 1954 as East Sichuan Normal School, it is one of the institutions of higher learning in the People's Republic of China and a top university in Chongqing, China.

It is composed of seventeen academic faculties offering a wide range of undergraduate and graduate programs. The university has three main campuses: the University City Campus, located on Huxi Street in the Chongqing High-tech Development Zone; the Beibei Campus, situated on Beiquan Road in Beibei District; and the Shapingba Campus, located on Tianchen Road in Shapingba District. The university's library is the largest academic library system in Chongqing, with approximately 20.4 million items, including 79 electronic book databases and around 2.69 million physical items.

Chongqing Normal University is authorized by the Ministry of Education China to admit international students. It was recognized by the Overseas Chinese Affairs Office as one of the first Chinese language educational centres and was awarded the National Teaching Base for International Promotion of Chinese, which is a designation given to select institutions in China promoting the language by the Confucius Institute in 2007.

The Faculty of Politics at Chongqing Normal University is considered one of the leading political research institutions in China. The faculty, which is led by Meng Dongfang, also the president of the university, hosts several teaching and research platforms, including the Ministry of Education's Innovation and Development Center for Ideological and Political Education, the Chongqing Research Center for Civic Morality and Social Construction, and the Chongqing Theoretical Research Center for Socialism with Chinese Characteristics.

The history of Chongqing Normal University dates back to the founding of the official East Sichuan Normal School in 1906. The first principal was Deng Ken, the younger brother of Deng Xiaoping, who served as Vice Mayor of Chongqing City and Vice Governor of Hubei. In 1960, Guo Moruo, then president of the Chinese Academy of Sciences, wrote the name of the school by himself. In 2003, the university was officially named Chongqing Normal University.

== List of university faculties ==
No.	Faculty
1	Faculty of Politics
2	Faculty of Mathematical Sciences
3	Faculty of Foreign Languages and Literatures
4	Faculty of Liberal Arts
5	Faculty of Education
6	Faculty of History and Social Science
7	Faculty of Economic and Management
8	Faculty of Geography and Tourism
9	Faculty of Life Science
10	Faculty of Primary Education
11	Faculty of Computer and Information Science
12	Faculty of Journalism and Media Communication
13	Faculty of Physics and Electronic Engineering
14	Faculty of Music
15	Faculty of Fine Arts
16	Faculty of Chemistry
17	Faculty of Physical Education and Health Science

== Campus environment ==
=== Library ===
The library of Chongqing Normal University, first established in 1954, has developed into a large-scale comprehensive library serving the university's academic and research needs. It operates across three campuses with a total area of 46,251 square meters and 4,529 reading seats, offering extensive digital and physical collections. As of the end of 2021, the library held over 2.73 million printed books, approximately 1.64 million e-books, more than 900,000 electronic journals, and provided access to over 59 databases.

=== Museum ===
The Chongqing Normal University Museum was first established in 1984 at the Huxi Campus and relocated to a new facility in University Town in 2014, with exhibition areas covering approximately 3,000 square meters. The museum focuses on supporting humanities education and research through the collection and study of cultural artifacts, developing a distinctive academic tradition and collection style. Its exhibitions include six major themes, such as the Civilization of the Three Gorges, Folk Culture, and Archaeological Science, featuring a wide range of artifacts including historical relics, calligraphy and paintings, and Han dynasty pictorial bricks. Since opening, the museum has received visitors from domestic and international institutions, students, and the general public, serving as a significant cultural venue for University Town and surrounding areas.

== Photo gallery ==
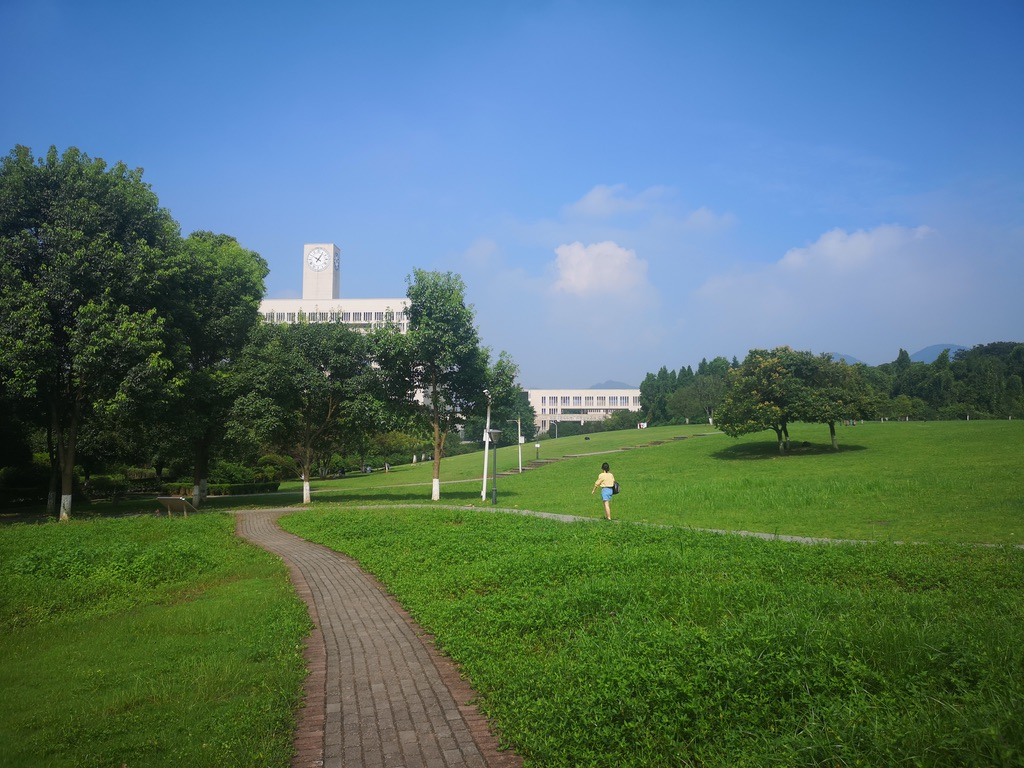

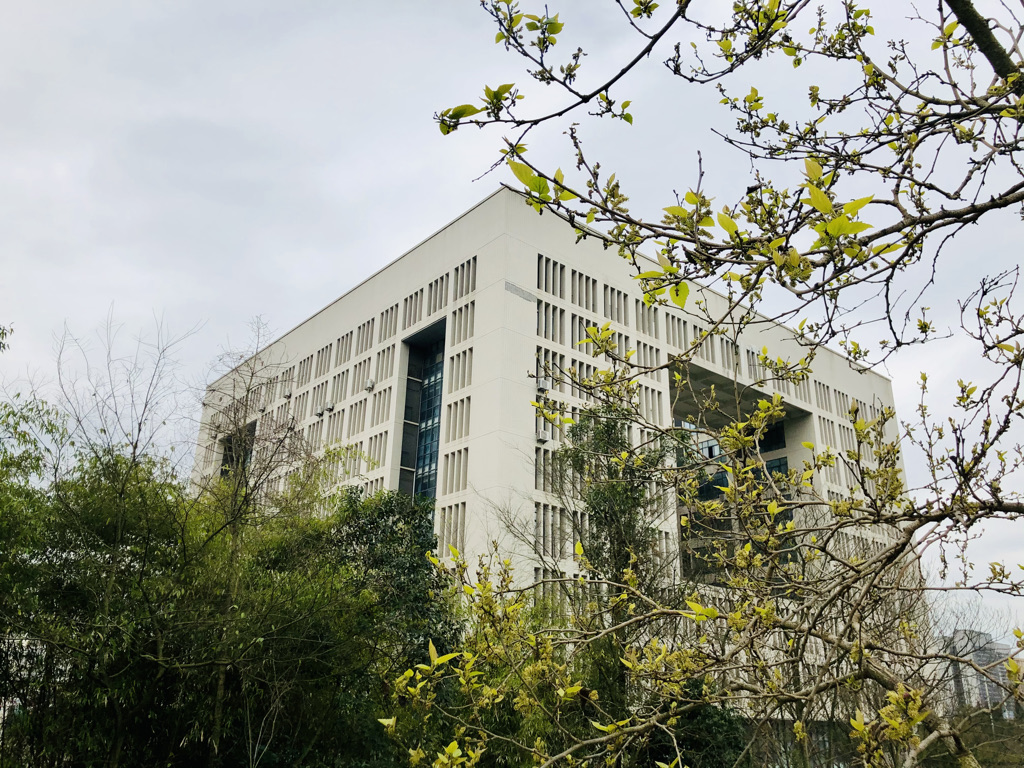

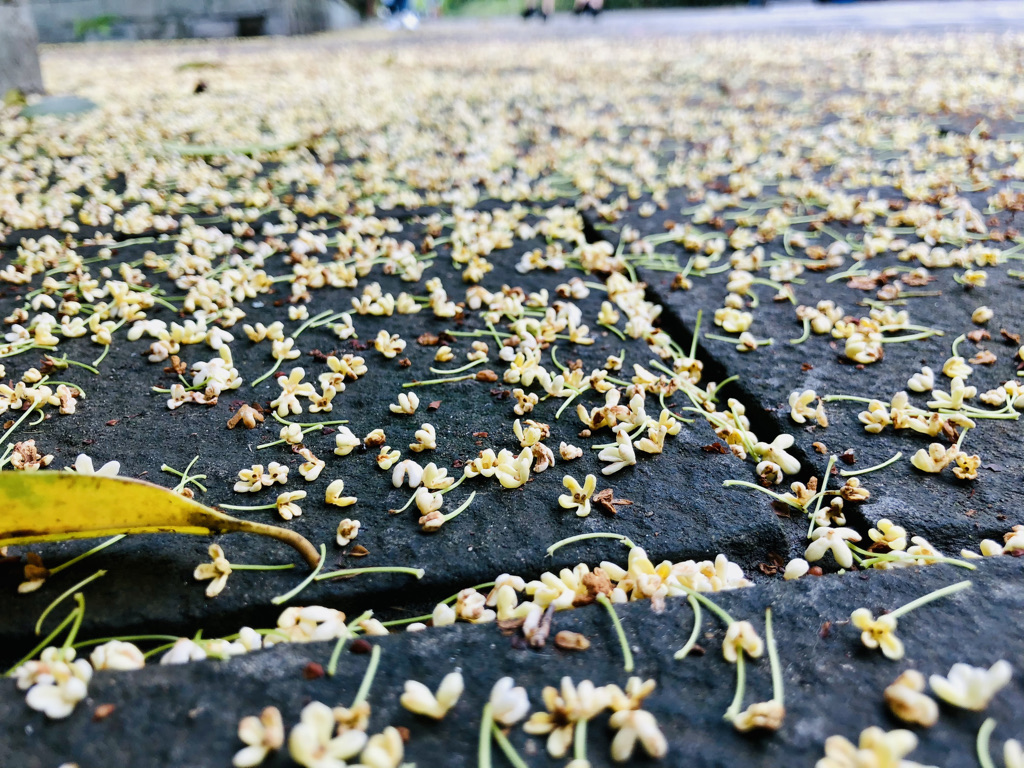

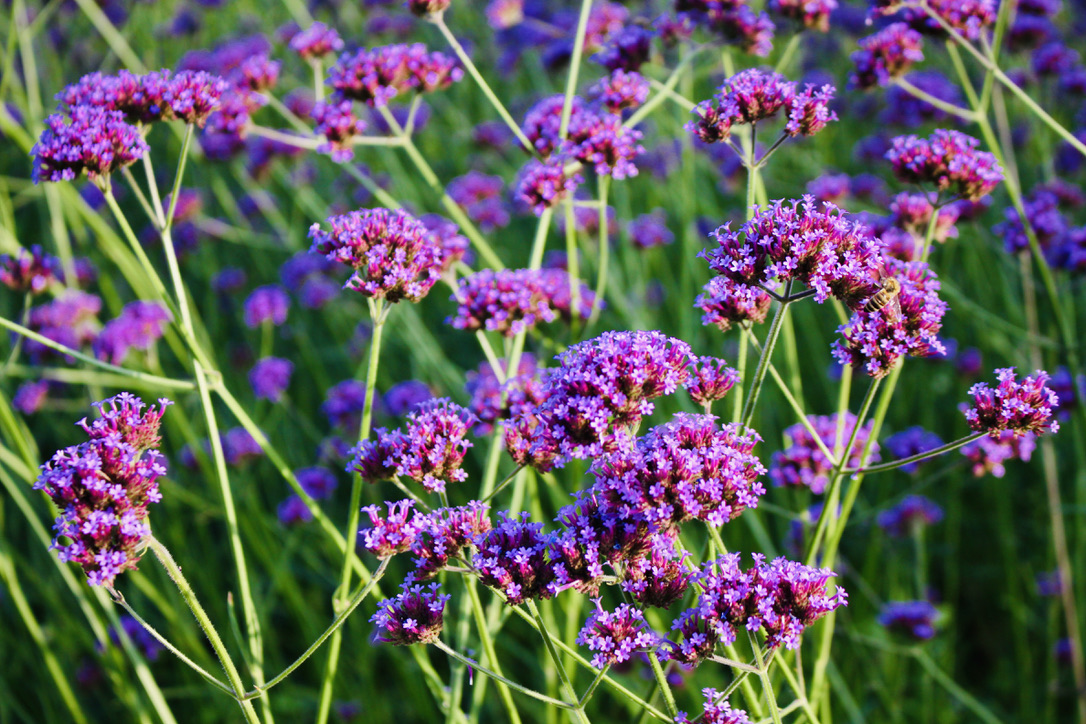

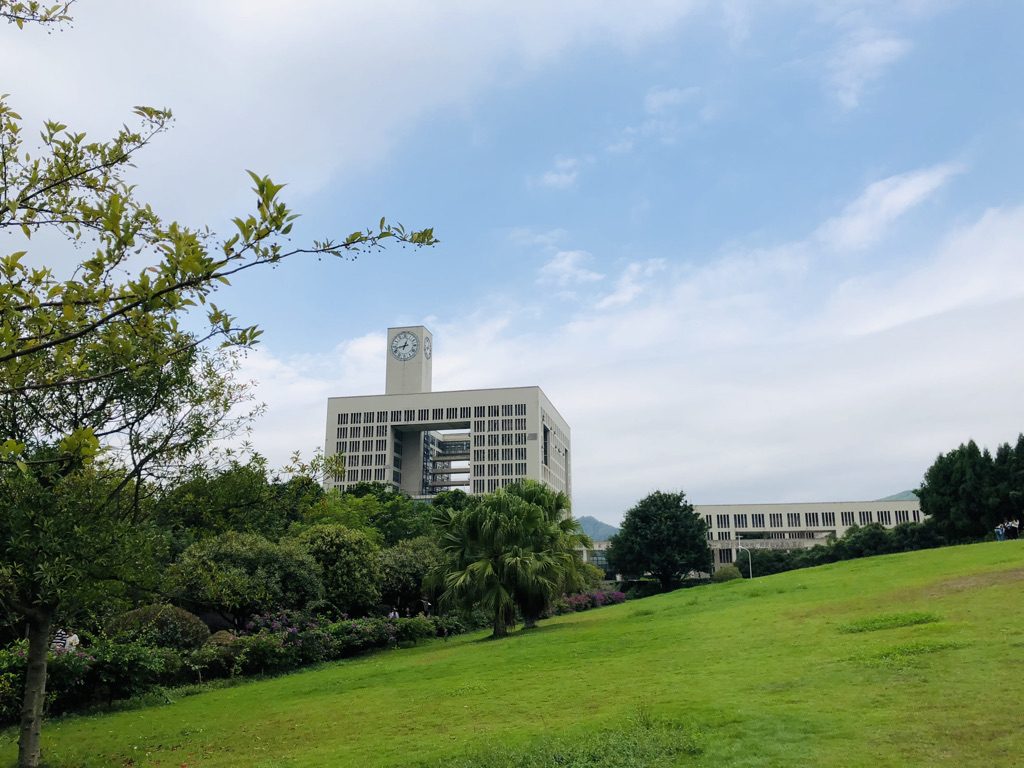

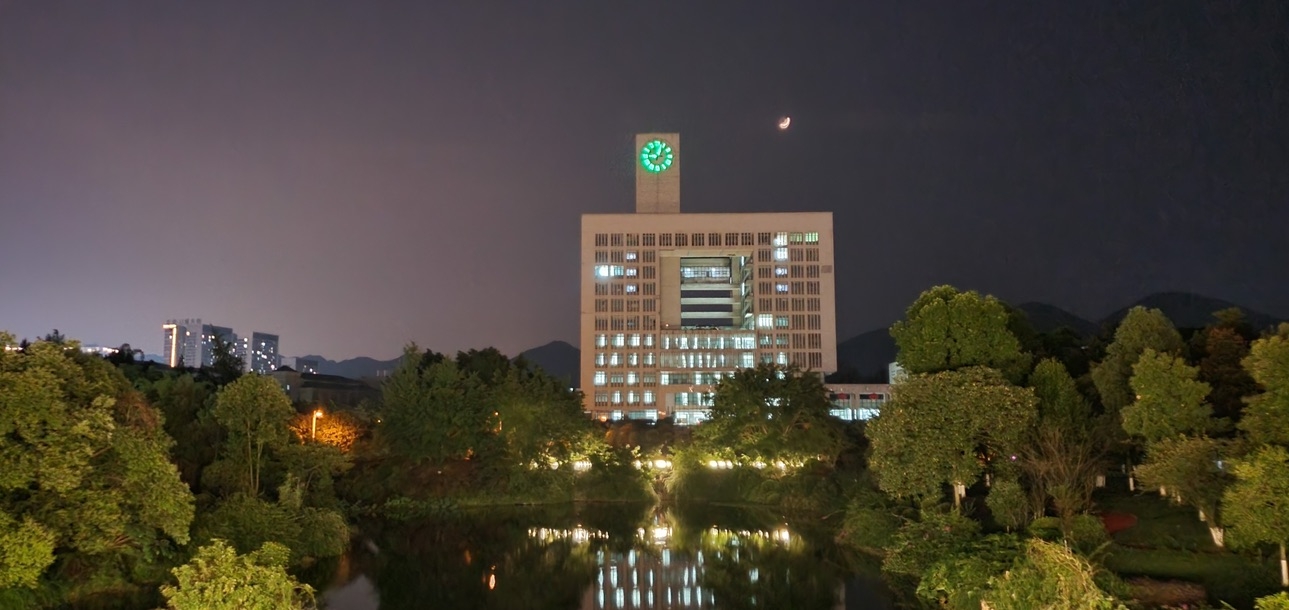

== Notable alumni ==
- Feng "Franklin" Tao, Chinese-born American chemical engineer
- Yin Jiaxu, ex-chairman of Norinco
