= Feng "Franklin" Tao =

Chinese-American chemical engineer

- Born: August 28, 1971 (age 55); Chongqing, Sichuan, China
- Education: Chongqing Normal University; Princeton University
- Awards: Fellow of American Association for the Advancement of Science (2017)
- Scientific career
- Workplaces: University of California, Berkeley; University of Notre Dame; University of Kansas

Feng "Franklin" Tao (Chinese: 陶丰; pinyin: Táo Fēng; born August 28, 1971) is a Chinese-born American chemical engineer who was a tenured associate professor at the University of Kansas. His research areas of specialization are heterogeneous catalysis, energy chemistry, nanoscience and surface science.

== Education and career ==
Tao earned his undergraduate degree at Chongqing Normal University. He pursued a PhD in physical chemistry at Princeton University from 2002 to 2007 and conducted postdoctoral research in catalysis at University of California at Berkeley.

He started his career as an assistant professor at the University of Notre Dame in 2014. During his tenure at the University of Kansas, he rose to the rank of associate professor in the chemical & petroleum engineering and chemistry departments (during which time he was honored by the university as a "Miller Scholar") and also served as the director of the Nanocatalysis for Chemical and Energy Transformations Lab.

Tao did research on in situ studies of chemistry & structure of materials in reactive environments, and conducted further studies on reactor for tracking catalyst nanoparticles in liquid at high temperature under a high-pressure gas phase with X-ray absorption spectroscopy. He has published over 180 papers in international journals. He also served on the advisory boards of Chemical Society Reviews and Catalysis Science & Technology.

== Federal charges, conviction, and acquittal ==
In 2019, the United States Department of Justice indicted Tao for 'failing to disclose conflict of interest with a Chinese university', as the first case of its China Initiative. The evidence used by the Department of Justice was obtained after Tao was reported to the FBI for alleged espionage by a vengeful co-author, who presented manufactured evidence to the FBI. Based on this evidence, the FBI obtained a search warrant. Tao was subsequently indicted for an email regarding a contract to teach in China, but not for alleged espionage. Tao and his lawyer rebutted the accusations, stating that the contract was neither signed nor accepted by Tao. Using a GoFundMe campaign and loans from family members, Tao and his family raised "hundreds of thousands of dollars" to fund their defense.

On April 7, 2022, Tao was convicted by a jury of "three counts of wire fraud and one count of false statements" for not disclosing the contract on conflict of interest forms. Tao was fired by the University of Kansas following the conviction.

On September 20, 2022, a federal judge threw out the three convictions of wire fraud, leaving the count of making false statements on a form. The judge ruled that prosecutors had not provided sufficient evidence to prove the wire fraud convictions. On January 18, 2023, the judge sentenced Tao for the count of false statements to time served and supervised release, with no additional prison time, saying his case "is not an espionage case" and the prosecutor presented no evidence that Tao received any money for his work in China. The judge also noted that Tao had published 16 papers and a book while working at home on unpaid administrative leave since being banned from KU's campus in 2019, saying that such a high level of productivity was indicative of his "continued value to society."

On July 11, 2024, a federal appeals court voided Tao's last conviction for the count of false statements, finding that the government had failed to provide sufficient evidence to show that any harm had been done, and directing the lower court to acquit him. Tao then sought reinstatement of his tenured faculty position at the University of Kansas.

The University of Kansas refused to reinstate Tao after his convictions were overturned. Tao is currently suing the university in a lawsuit filed in January 2025 stating that he was wrongfully and illegally terminated from his tenured position and that he seeks reparations and reinstatement. The lawsuit alleges that the University of Kansas collaborated with the FBI to conduct illegal surveillance on Tao and violated a signed agreement on his employment status. The then-deputy general counsel of the university addressed the FBI agents as though they were friends and congratulated the FBI upon the arrest of Tao.

== Personal life ==
Tao is married to Hong Peng, a radiologist.

== Awards and honors ==
- 2007, IUPAC Young Chemists Award
- 2012, AVS Paul Holloway Award
- 2014, NSF CAREER Award
- 2017, Fellow of the American Association for the Advancement of Science (AAAS)

== See also ==
- Gang Chen (engineer), another Chinese–American engineer controversially indicted as part of the China Initiative

== External pages ==
- Google Scholar
