= Catalysis Science & Technology =

- Discipline: Chemistry, catalysis
- Language: English
- Edited by: Bert Weckhuysen, Utrecht University, Netherlands

Publication details
- History: 2011–present
- Publisher: Royal Society of Chemistry (United Kingdom)
- Frequency: Monthly
- Open access: Hybrid
- Impact factor: 6.177 (2021)

Standard abbreviations
- ISO 4: Catal. Sci. Technol.

Indexing
- CODEN: CSTAGD
- ISSN: 2044-4753 (print); 2044-4761 (web)
- OCLC no.: 703389810

Links
- Journal homepage

Catalysis Science & Technology is a peer-reviewed scientific journal that is published monthly by the Royal Society of Chemistry. The editor-in-chief is Bert Weckhuysen (Utrecht University, Netherlands).

The first online articles were published in January 2011, and the first issue of Catalysis Science & Technology appeared in March 2011. All articles published up to the end of 2012 are available free online. According to the Journal Citation Reports, the journal has a 2021 impact factor of 6.177.

== Scope ==
Catalysis Science & Technology covers both the science of catalysis and catalysis technology, including applications addressing global issues. The journal publishes research in the applied, fundamental, experimental and computational areas of catalysis. Contributions are made by the homogeneous, heterogeneous and biocatalysis communities.

== Article types ==
Catalysis Science & Technology publishes the following types of articles:

- Full Papers (original scientific work)
- Communications (preliminary accounts that merit urgent publication)
- Mini-reviews (short accounts of the published articles on the topic of catalysis)
- Perspectives (personal accounts or critical analyses of specialist areas)

== Abstracting and indexing ==
Catalysis Science & Technology is abstracted and indexed in the Science Citation Index and Scopus.
