= Zhiting Tian =

Chinese-American mechanical engineer

Zhiting Tian is a Chinese-American mechanical engineer specializing in heat transfer and thermoelectrics of nanoscopic scale materials, and the thermal properties of polymers. She is a professor and Eugene A. Leinroth Sesquicentennial Faculty Fellow in the Sibley School of Mechanical and Aerospace Engineering at Cornell University.

== Education and career ==
Tian graduated from Tsinghua University in 2007 with a bachelor's degree in engineering physics. She earned a master's degree in mechanical engineering from Binghamton University in 2009, working there with Ying Sun. She completed a Ph.D. in mechanical engineering from the Massachusetts Institute of Technology in 2014. Her dissertation, Exploring heat transfer at the atomistic level for thermal energy conversion and management, was supervised by Gang Chen.

After working as an assistant professor of mechanical engineering at Virginia Tech from 2014 to 2018, she joined the Cornell University faculty in 2018. At Cornell, she is an associate professor and Eugene A. Leinroth Sesquicentennial Faculty Fellow.

== Recognition ==
Tian was elected as an ASME Fellow in 2019.
