= Kun-Liang Guan =

Sino-American biochemist

- Born: 管坤良; 1963 (age 62–63); Tongxiang, Zhejiang Province, China
- Education: Hangzhou University (BS), Purdue University (PhD)
- Known for: Protein tyrosine phosphatase
- Awards: MacArthur Award
- Scientific career
- Fields: Biochemistry
- Institutions: University of Michigan, University of California, San Diego
- Doctoral advisor: Henry Weiner

Kun-Liang Guan (Chinese: 管坤良; pinyin: Guǎn Kūnliǎng; born 1963) is a Chinese and American biochemist. He won the MacArthur Award in 1998.

== Career ==
In 1963, Guan was born in Tongxiang (Jiaxing, Zhejiang Province), China. In 1982, Guan graduated (B.S.) from the department of biology, Hangzhou University (previous and current Zhejiang University). He did his postgraduate study at Purdue University (Ph.D. 1989; Advisor: Prof. Henry Weiner). In 1992, Guan joined the faculty in the University of Michigan Department of Biological Chemistry. From 1996 to 2000, he was an associate professor at the University of Michigan. In 2000 Guan became a professor (Halvor Christensen Collegiate Professor in Life Sciences, 2003–2007) at the University of Michigan.

In 1998, Kun-Liang Guan was rewarded a MacArthur Fellowship, with a grant of $230,000 over five years. Before this, he won the Schering-Plough Award, by the American Society for Biochemistry and Molecular Biology (ASBMB).

Guan currently is a professor of the Molecular Cell Biology lab at Westlake University, Hangzhou. Guan's research focuses on cancer biology and the intracellular signal transduction in cell growth regulation. Guan has made seminal contributions in the fields of protein tyrosine phosphatase, Mitogen-Activated Protein (MAP) kinase, and the mammalian Target of Rapamycin (mTOR) pathways. Guan and his team have published numerous influential papers in, many publications, such as Cell, Nature and Science.

Research in Guan's laboratory focuses on intracellular signal transduction in cell growth regulation and cancer biology.

Tuberous sclerosis complex (TSC) is an autosomal dominant disorder characterized by the development of benign tumors in a wide range of tissues. Mutations in either the TSC1 or TSC2 tumor suppressor gene are responsible for TSC disease. TSC1 and TSC2 proteins form a physical and functional complex.

Recent studies from Guan's laboratory demonstrate that TSC1/TSC2 functions to inhibit the mammalian target of rapamycin (mTOR), which is a central cell growth controller conserved from yeast to human. mTOR integrates a wide range of signals, including growth factors, nutrients, and stress conditions, to regulate cell growth and cell size.

Two distinct TOR complexes, TORC1 and TORC2, have been identified. These two TOR complexes phosphorylate different substrates and have distinct physiological functions. For example, TORC1 phosphorylates the ribosomal S6 kinase (S6K), thereby regulating translation and cell growth.

In contrast, TORC2 phosphorylates and activates AKT, a key kinase involved in cell growth and apoptosis. Guan and his team are interested in how mTOR is regulated by upstream signals, such nutrients and cellular energy levels. In addition, they are studying the mechanism of mTOR activation by the phosphatidyl inositol 3-kinase (PI3K).

The second project in his laboratory is studying the novel Hippo tumor suppressor pathway. Recent genetic studies in Drosophila have shown that the Hippo signaling pathway plays a key role in restricting organ size by controlling both cell proliferation and apoptosis. Components of the Hippo pathway are highly conserved in mammalian cells. Acting down stream of the Hippo pathway is the YAP oncogene, which encodes a transcription co-activator.

Their recent studies have shown that regulation of YAP by the Hippo pathway plays a critical role in cell contact inhibition. Furthermore, YAP is elevated in many human cancers. The main focus of this project is to elucidate the physiological regulation of the Hippo pathway and to understand how dysregulation of the pathway contributes to tumorigenesis.
