= Yan Ning =

Chinese structural biologist

- 颜宁
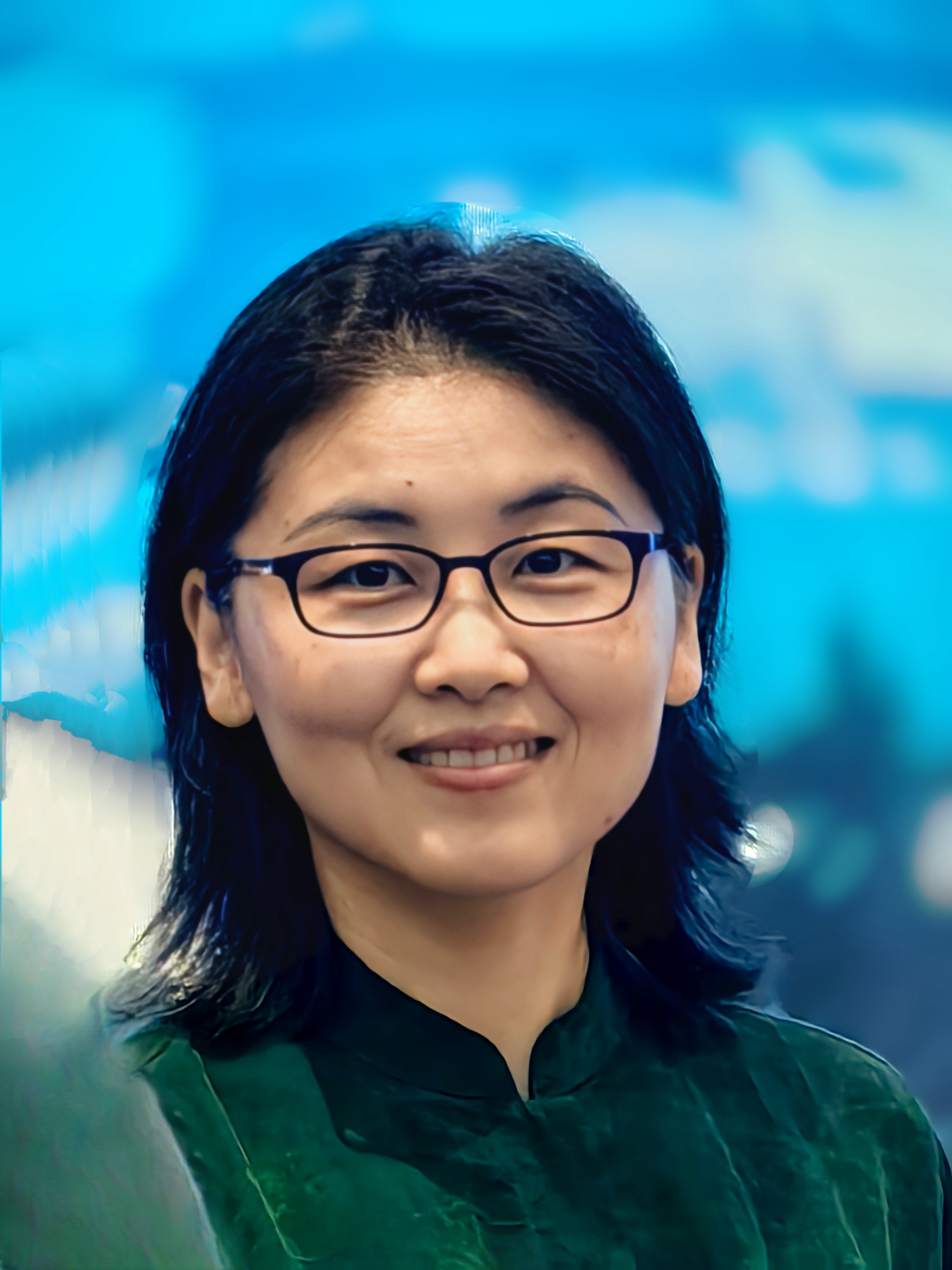
- Nieng Yan (2024)
- Born: 21 November 1977 (age 48); Zhangqiu, Shandong, China
- Other name: Nieng Yan
- Education: Tsinghua University (BS); Princeton University (PhD)
- Awards: (see Honors and awards)
- Scientific career
- Fields: Membrane protein
- Workplaces: Princeton University; Tsinghua University
- Thesis: Biochemical and structural dissection of the regulation of apoptotic pathways in Drosophila and C. elegans (2005)
- Doctoral advisor: Shi Yigong

Chinese name
- Simplified Chinese: 颜宁
- Traditional Chinese: 顏寧
Transcriptions
Standard Mandarin
- Hanyu Pinyin: Yán Níng
- Website: life.tsinghua.edu.cn/info/1033/4384.htm

Yan Ning (Chinese: 颜宁; born 21 November 1977; also spelled as Nieng Yan) is a Chinese structural biologist. She has been serving as professor of life science at Tsinghua University since December 2022. She previously served as a professor at Princeton University from 2017 to 2022 and a faculty member at Tsinghua University from 2007 to 2017.

== Early life and education ==
Yan was born in Zhangqiu District of Jinan, Shandong, China in 1977.

Yan received a Bachelor of Science from the Department of Biological Sciences and Biotechnology at Tsinghua University in 2000. She received a Doctor of Philosophy in molecular biology from Princeton University in 2004. Her doctoral adviser was Shi Yigong. She was a postdoctoral researcher at Princeton University from 2004 to 2007.

Yan was the regional winner of the Young Scientist Award in North America, which is co-sponsored by Science/AAAS and GE Healthcare, for her thesis on the structural and mechanistic study of programmed cell death. She continued her postdoctoral training at Princeton, focusing on the structural characterization of intramembrane proteases, until 2007.

== Career ==
In 2007, she joined Tsinghua University as a faculty member at the university's School of Medicine and Life Sciences. In 2012, she was promoted as a tenured professor at Tsinghua University. Her research focused on the structure and mechanism of membrane transport protein, exemplified by the glucose transporter GLUT1 and voltage-gated sodium and calcium channels.

In 2017, Yan decided to leave Tsinghua and join Princeton University as the Shirley M. Tilghman Professor of Molecular Biology. The move gained widespread attention in China and led to a national discussion both within the science community and the general public. The cause was widely speculated to be the difficulty to do what she wanted to do under China's academic system, as she had criticized the China National Natural Science Foundation's reluctance to support high risk research in a series of blogs. However, Yan dismissed this claim later, and stated "changing one's environment can bring new pressure and inspiration for academic breakthroughs".

For her research achievements, Dr. Yan has won a number of prizes. She was an HHMI international early career scientist in 2012–2017, the recipient of the 2015 Protein Society Young Investigator Award, the 2015 Beverley & Raymond Sackler International Prize in Biophysics, the Alexander M. Cruickshank Award at the GRC on membrane transport proteins in 2016, the 2018 FAOBMB Award for Research Excellence, and the 2019 Weizmann Women & Science Award. Yan was elected a foreign associate of the United States National Academy of Sciences in April 2019. Yan was elected a foreign associate of the American Academy of Arts and Sciences in April 2021. On the same year, she became a visiting professor at the School for Biotechnology and Biomolecular Sciences in the University of New South Wales under the university's Strategic Hires and Retention Pathways (SHARP) program.

On 1 November 2022, while speaking at the Shenzhen Global Innovation Forum of Talents, Yan announced that she would resign from her position at Princeton and return to China to become a founding dean of the Shenzhen Medical Academy of Research and Translation. In December 2022, she resigned from Princeton and returned to China, where she accepted her new position. On 22 March 2023, Yan was appointed as director of the Shenzhen Bay Laboratory. Yan was elected a foreign associate of the European Molecular Biology Organization in July 2023. In November 2023, Yan was elected as an academician of the Chinese Academy of Sciences.

== Personal life ==
Yan is a close friend of Li Yinuo, who she met as a student while studying at Tsinghua University.

== Honors and awards ==
Year	List of Awards
2025	Won the title of National 8 March Red Flag Bearer in 2024; Asian Scientist 100
2024	L’Oréal-UNESCO For Women in Science International Awards laureate
2023	Chinese Academy of Sciences Member, Chinese Academy of Sciences; European Molecular Biology Organization Foreign Associate, European Molecular Biology Organization
2021	American Academy of Arts and Sciences Foreign Associate, American Academy of Arts and Sciences
2019	National Academy of Sciences Foreign Associate, National Academy of Sciences; Weizmann Women & Science Award, Weizmann Institute of Science
2018	FAOBMB Award for Excellence, Federation of National Societies of Biochemistry and Molecular Biology in the Asian and Oceanian Region
2017	Wu-Janssen Award in Biomedical Basic Research, China; Teaching award, Tsinghua University
2016	Alexander M. Cruickshank Award for the Gordon Research Conference on Membrane Transport Proteins: Molecules to Medicine
2015	The Protein Science Young Investigator Award, Protein Society; The Raymond and Beverly Sackler International Prize in Biophysics, Tel Aviv University
2014	Cell "40under40", Cell; Promega Awards for Biochemistry, Promega; Cheung Kong Scholar, Ministry of Education, China; The Ho Leung Ho Lee Award for Advancement in Science and Technology, China
2012	Howard Hughes Medical Institute International Early Career Scientist, HHMI; Award for "Women in Science" of China; CC Tan Award for Innovation in Life Sciences, China
2011	National Outstanding Young Scientist Award, China
2006	Young Scientist Award (North America Regional Winner), AAAS/Science and GE
