= Wang Hongfei =

Chinese physical chemist

- Born: May 3, 1968 (age 58); Yongchuan, Chongqing, China
- Education: Columbia University
- Scientific career
- Fields: Physical Chemistry
- Workplaces: Fudan University
- Thesis: Second Harmonic Generation Studies of Chemistry at Liquid Interfaces (1996)
- Doctoral advisor: Kenneth B. Eisenthal

Wang Hongfei (Chinese: 王鸿飞; born May 3, 1968, in Yongchuan District, Chongqing, China) is a physical chemist and chemical physicist. Since 2017, he is a professor in the department of chemistry of Fudan University in Shanghai, China.

== Biography ==
After three years of primary school education at the affiliated school of the No. 106 Geological Survey Unit of the Bureau of Geological Service of the Sichuan Province in 1975–1978, in the deep mountainous area in the Panzhihua City, Wang was admitted to the first class of the middle school of the then newly established No. 3 Bingcaogang Secondary/High School at Panzhihua City. Before the new semester started, he moved with his family to Chongqing County (Now Chongzhou City), about 25 miles west from Chengdu, the capitol of Sichuan Province, and there he attended the Chongqing Middle/High School in 1978–1983, before he attended the University of Science and Technology of China(USTC) for bachelor's degree as well as studied for master's degree for almost three years. His master's degree advisor was Professor Xingxiao Ma, one of the last graduate students of Professor Qian Xuesen, who was the founder of the Department of Chemical Physics at the USTC in 1958. Then he received his Ph.D. in Department of Chemistry, Columbia University in 1996 under Professor Kenneth B. Eisenthal. His PhD dissertation titled: Second Harmonic Generation Studies of Chemistry at Liquid Interfaces. He did his postdoctoral research jointly at the DuPont Marshall laboratory & Department of Chemistry, University of Pennsylvania from 1996 to 1999 with Professor Hai-lung Dai (Penn) and Dr. An-gong Yeh (DuPont). Then he joined the State Key Laboratory of Molecular Reaction Dynamics, Institute of Chemistry, Chinese Academy of Sciences as a professor until 2009. Later on he continued his research as a Chief Scientist at the Environmental Molecular Sciences Laboratory (EMSL), Pacific Northwest National Laboratory (PNNL) of United States Department of Energy. In 2017 he joined the Department of Chemistry, Fudan University.

He is married to Wang Danhong (Chinese: 王丹红), a well known scientific journalist and writer in China.

== Research ==
Wang's research interests include the structure and reaction dynamics of surface and interface, linear and nonlinear optical spectroscopy and modern analytical spectroscopy. He is mostly known for his "seminal contributions to the development of surface nonlinear vibrational spectroscopy and to the understanding of molecular interaction and structure at interfaces". His most cited paper so far is a systematic survey on the "Quantitative spectral and orientational analysis in surface sum frequency generation vibrational spectroscopy (SFG-VS)". In recent years, he developed the sub wavenumber high resolution broadband SFG-VS and demonstrated its ability for obtaining intrinsic and accurate spectral lineshape in SFG-VS and other nonlinear spectroscopic techniques, such as the Femtosecond Stimulated Raman Spectroscopy (FSRS).

== Prizes and awards ==
Wang was selected to the Hundred Talent Program, Chinese Academy of Sciences in 1999; Then in 2004, Wang was awarded the Distinguished Young Scholar of the Chinese National Natural Science Foundation (NSFC). He was elected Fellow of American Physical Society (APS Fellow) in 2012.

== Other activities ==
Wang has been one of the most influential bloggers on science and academic issues in China, for he has been an active blogger on the ScienceNet.cn online platform since its inception in 2007. Even though he has less posts in the past three years, he has written over one thousand blog posts and they have attracted over 10 million hits.
