= Trial of Anming Hu =

2021 trial of Chinese-Canadian researcher

Anming Hu
- Chinese: 胡安明
Transcriptions
Standard Mandarin
- Hanyu Pinyin: Hú Ānmíng

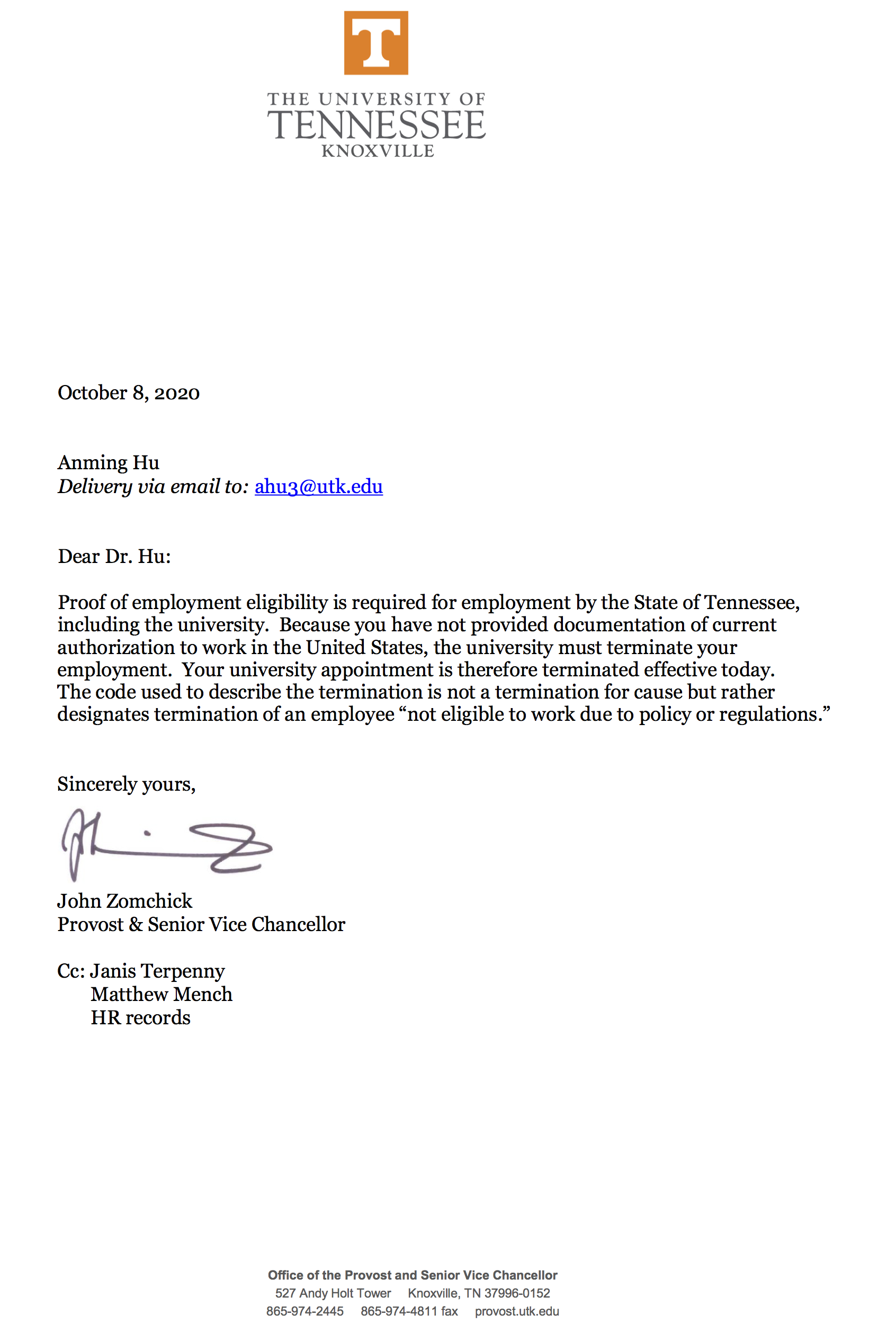
Termination letter sent to Anming Hu in October 2020

On February 27, 2020, Chinese-Canadian academic Anming Hu was arrested and charged with fraud, as well as accusations of not disclosing his association with a Chinese university. On September 9, 2021, Hu was acquitted of all charges. On February 1, 2022, he returned to his lab at the University of Tennessee, Knoxville (UTK).

Anming Hu (born 1968) is a Chinese-Canadian academic who worked as an associate professor in the Department of Mechanical, Aerospace and Biomedical Engineering at the UTK from 2013 up until February 2020, when UTK suspended him.

Hu was charged under a 2011 law which the Trump administration used to target professors and researchers working at American universities, as part of the "China Initiative" on combating economic espionage. Hu was the first target of the China Initiative to stand trial. He was represented by Knoxville attorney Phil Lomonaco. Hu was charged with three counts of wire fraud and three counts of making false statements, after 21 months of FBI surveillance failed to turn up evidence of espionage. The first trial of Hu's case ended in a mistrial due to a hung jury on June 16, 2021. The trial generated controversy due to the FBI's misconduct, which included knowingly building a case based on false evidence, obtaining Hu's university documents without warrant, spying on Hu and his family, and attempting to coerce Hu to spy on China for the United States. Following the mistrial, Hu was again prosecuted by the United States Department of Justice, which resulted in a second defeat for the Justice Department when Hu was acquitted.

== Background ==
Hu was born and raised in a rural village near Jinan in Shandong province, China. He earned his Bachelor of Science at Shandong University in 1990. He then attended the Chinese Academy of Sciences, acquiring a Master of Science as well as a PhD in condensed matter physics in 1993 and 1997, respectively. He immigrated to Canada, where he attended the University of Waterloo and graduated with his second PhD in laser physics in 2008. Hu had three children with his wife and became a Canadian citizen in 2009. At the time of his arrest, he had applied for permanent residency in the United States.

== First trial ==
=== FBI testimony ===
In June 2021, FBI agent Kujtim Sadiku admitted in a testimony that he falsely accused Hu of being a spy, baselessly implicated him as a Chinese military agent to UTK, and used false information to put him on the Federal No Fly List. The agent also stated he attempted to have Hu spy for the United States. Hu refused, leading to FBI agents stalking and harassing him for more than two years. According to Sadiku, he got a tip that Hu might be a spy but cannot remember where he got that information. He did a Google search of Hu in March 2018, which turned up a couple of press releases in Chinese with one including a photograph of Hu. Sadiku then proceeded to use Google translation to do further research. The app made an error in translating Hu's forename in the photo caption. The translation of two documents described Hu obtaining a 2012 "short term" award to teach at Beijing University for 20 hours annually through China's Long-Term Thousand Talents Program as a visiting scholar. Sadiku investigated him based on his involvement in the program, which he described as benefiting the Chinese military. He opened up an economic espionage case because the US government believes the program aims at acquiring information and technology from the US. When Sadiku confronted Hu, Hu said that those who agreed to spy for China were "cheaters," and that he was not involved in any espionage. Sadiku offered Hu to spy for the US using his part-time work at Beijing University as cover, but Hu refused, stating that he was too afraid. Hu then sent Sadiku an email informing him that he would not go to China. Despite no longer believing Hu was a spy, Sadiku ordered a surveillance team to spy on Hu and his eldest son, then a freshman at UT, for the next 21 months. A group of six or seven agents followed him to work, to school, to the grocery, and even went through his trash. They found no evidence of espionage, but the FBI persisted in building up a case against Hu, resulting in the fraud charges. Sadiku called it Operation Chelsea Dagger.

=== Fraud charges ===
The charges against Anming Hu were based on the Wolf Amendment, a 2011 defense spending bill that prevents NASA funds from being used for collaboration with "China or Chinese-owned companies." Hu was charged with three counts of wire fraud and three counts of making false statements in connection with a NASA grant he received through the University of Tennessee. Hu denied being a member of Long-Term Thousand Talents Program but admitted he had ties to the Beijing University of Technology and that he was working on a NASA grant. Hu had been upfront with his ties to a university in Beijing and followed UT administrative advice when preparing documents for the grant. As far as he knew, nothing criminal was involved in his summer work in China, which the University of Tennessee permitted. Hu had repeatedly disclosed his involvement in the Beijing university to UT, and a UT grant administrator even assured him via email that the NASA China restriction did not apply to faculty. He was told by UT that he only had to disclose income from lectures in China exceeding $10,000. He earned $3,000 from his lectures in China. Despite the lack of espionage charges, one of the prosecutors stated during the trial that one of the reasons for prosecuting scientists and professors was "to teach these Chinese spies a lesson."

The case against Hu depended on him knowing the government's new and expansive interpretation of research funding rules and hiding his affiliations with Beijing University of Technology. The indictment against Hu stated:

NASA defined "China or any Chinese-owned company" to include Chinese universities ... Through his fraudulent representations and omissions to UTK about his affiliation with BJUT, HU knowingly and willfully caused UTK to falsely certify to NASA and to NASA contractors that UTK was in compliance with NASA's China Funding Restriction

The definition was not published in NASA's Grants and Cooperative Agreements Manual (GCAM) but instead was circulated internally within NASA in the 2012 Grant Information Circular (GIC) 12-01A. According to NASA, the Information Circular "is used for internal dissemination ..., is temporary in nature or episodic and ... should be used very carefully and their duration shall not exceed one year" (NASA NFS Section 1801.272). As of 2016, NASA GIC 12-01A was no longer active. The U.S. used the same NASA Circular in 2020 as the basis for criminal charges against Texas A&M University professor Zhengdong Cheng.

=== Mistrial ===
Hu's trial for fraud ended on June 16, 2021, in a mistrial when the jury could not reach a verdict. Afterward, Wendy Chandler, who was Juror 44 and one of the four female jurors in an all-white jury, stated that she kept looking for a big reveal but ultimately characterized the trial as "the most ridiculous case" and the charges against Hu as "a series of plausible errors, a lack of support from UT, and ruthless ambition on behalf of the FBI." The day after the end of the trial, Democratic Representatives Ted Lieu, Mondaire Jones, and Pramila Jayapal voiced concerns about Hu's prosecution and called on Justice Department Inspector General Michael E. Horowitz to investigate allegations of FBI misconduct.

== Retrial ==
On July 30, 2021, the federal government announced that they would retry Anming Hu.

On September 9, 2021, Anming Hu was acquitted of fraud charges by a federal judge. According to U.S. District Judge Thomas A. Varlan: "[E]ven viewing all the evidence in the light most favorable to the government, no rational jury could conclude that defendant acted with a scheme to defraud NASA." Varlan cited testimony from NASA OIG special agent Lee Gibson:

Agent Gibson of the NASA Office of Inspector General testified that the NASA grant money that defendant helped obtain went to UTK ... Further, Agent Gibson testified that he had no evidence that defendant “took any money to China or had anybody in China working on” the NASA grants.

But according to NASA, "It is acceptable as long as you keep your NASA projects and your PRC related projects separate, i.e., don't use any NASA funds for projects with the PRC". Varlan further wrote, "In fact, Agent Gibson specifically testified that he was not sure whether BJUT was incorporated under the laws of the People’s Republic of China." Although Gibson speculated that NASA considered BJUT to be a Chinese-owned company NASA Senior Analyst Chris Murguia stated that 'a state-owned university [such as BJUT] would be considered “China”', whereas a private university is a "Chinese-owned company".

== Aftermath ==
=== University of Tennessee ===
It was revealed during the trial that the University of Tennessee aided the FBI in their investigation by handing over Hu's university documents without a warrant, concealing the investigation from him, misleading NASA, and firing him the moment he was arrested. Meetings were set up between Hu's bosses and the FBI but it is unclear who authorized these meetings. The FBI did not have any proof of wrongdoing by Hu when they entered UT and did not have the legal authority to take records from his personnel files.

The university suspended Hu without pay and the federal government revoked his work authorization. According to the faculty handbook, the faculty senate president should be consulted when the administration is considering suspending a tenured faculty member, which did not happen. The then-president was only informed of the case.

After being acquitted of wrongdoing, UT Provost and Senior Vice Chancellor John Zomchick said the university was willing to undo Hu's termination if he could verify U.S. authorization to work in the next year. According to Mary McAlpin, the president of the UT chapter of the American Association of University Professors, regaining his work visa would require sponsorship from UT.

Subsequently, in October 2021 the university offered to reinstate Hu with some back pay, research funding, and university support to regain his work visa. His reinstatement was finalized effective February 1, 2022.

=== Casey Arrowood ===
The prosecution of Anming Hu was led by Assistant U.S. Attorney Casey Arrowood. Arrowood was nominated in 2022 by President Biden for U.S. Attorney of the Eastern District of Tennessee. Asian American civil rights groups called on supporters to oppose the nomination, which they called an "affront to the Asian American, immigrant, and scientific communities." Hu said that instead of being punished, Arrowood is being rewarded, encouraging future cases such as his to happen again.

== Accusations of racial profiling ==
The OCA-Asian Pacific American Advocates denounced the government's decision to retry Anming Hu. OCA National president Linda Ng accused law enforcement of rampant anti-Asian sentiment and "systemic efforts to strip Asian Americans and Asian immigrants of their civil liberties." Nearly 100 members of Congress led by Representative Ted Lieu sent a letter to Attorney General Merrick Garland calling for an investigation into the "wrongful targeting of individuals of Asian descent." US Congressperson Judy Chu accused the FBI of racial profiling in a Congressional Asian Pacific American Caucus (CAPAC) statement, pointing out that Hu's case is only the most glaring of many FBI cases that had been flawed from the start, "evident in the number of cases that have been dropped without any explanation."
