= Xinnian Dong =

Chinese-American biologist

- 董欣年
- Born: 1959 (age 66–67); Wuhan, Hubei, China
- Education: Wuhan University; Northwestern University; Harvard University
- Spouse: Xiao-Fan Wang
- Scientific career
- Fields: Molecular biology Plant physiology
- Workplaces: Duke University

Xinnian Dong (Chinese: 董欣年; pinyin: Dǒng Xīnnián; born 1959) is a Chinese-American biologist who is the current Arts and Sciences Professor of Biology in the Trinity College of Arts and Sciences, Duke University, United States. She is a member of the US National Academy of Sciences.

== Biography ==
Dong was born in Wuhan, Hubei, China in 1959, to Dong Fureng (Chinese: 董辅礽), a Chinese-American economist, and Liu Ainian (Chinese: 刘蔼年), a Chinese-American ophthalmologist. After resuming the college entrance examination, Dong was accepted to Wuhan University, where she graduated in 1982. After college, she attended the China-United States Biochemistry Examination and Application (CUSBEA) and was sent abroad to study at the expense of the Chinese government, along with her husband, Xiao-Fan Wang. In 1983, she pursued advanced studies in the United States, earning her doctorate from Northwestern University in 1988. Dong did post-doctoral research at Harvard University from 1988 to 1991. Dong joined the faculty of Duke University in 1992 and established the Dong Lab.

Since 1992, Dr. Dong and the Dong Lab has studied plant-microbe interactions with an emphasis on systemic acquired resistance (SAR) The Lab's early work involved the identification of key components in SAR, including NPR_{1}. More recently, the Lab made discoveries which provided new insights into the relationship between pathogen-induced cellular redox changes and induced immune responses in plants and the role of ER-resident genes in the modification and secretion of antimicrobial proteins. Most recently, the Lab has conducted genomic studies, leading to the discovery of new components in R gene-mediated resistance against downy mildew (Hyaloperonospora parasitica). They also currently investigate links between chromatin stability and plant defense.

== Personal life ==
She became a naturalized US citizen in 1998. Dong was married to Xiao-Fan Wang, a Chinese American oncologist.

== Awards and honors ==
- 2011, Member, American Association for the Advancement of Science (AAAS)
- 2012, elected an academician of the National Academy of Sciences
- 2014 & 2015, Selected as one of the most influential scientific minds
