= Yin Jiaxu =

Chinese business executive

- 尹家绪

Chairman of Norincon Group
- In office 2013–2018
- Preceded by: ?
- Succeeded by: Jiao Kaihe

Personal details
- Born: April 1956 (age 70) Chongqing, China
- Party: Chinese Communist Party (1984–2021; expelled)
- Education: Chongqing Normal University; Chongqing University

Chinese name
- Simplified Chinese: 尹家绪
- Traditional Chinese: 尹家緒
Transcriptions
Standard Mandarin
- Hanyu Pinyin: Yǐn Jiāxù

Yin Jiaxu (Chinese: 尹家绪; born April 1956) is a retired Chinese business executive who served as chairman of Norincon Group between 2013 and 2018. He has retired for more than two years. He was investigated by China's top anti-graft agency in April 2021. He is the first senior official in state-owned enterprise and the sixth senior official in China to be targeted by China's top anticorruption watchdog in 2021. He entered the workforce in December 1976, and joined the Chinese Communist Party in June 1984.

He was a delegate to the 16th National Congress of the Chinese Communist Party. He was a deputy to the 10th and 11th National People's Congress.

== Biography ==
Yin was born in Chongqing, in April 1956. Beginning in December 1976, he served in several posts in Yuzhou Gear Factory, including worker, deputy factory manager, and factory manager.

In February 1996, he was dispatched to the Southwest Ordnance Industry Bureau, where he was appointed vice president in July of that same year. He also served as general manager of China Changan Automobile Group since July 1998. After the institutional reform as China South Industries Group, he served as deputy general manager in January 2002 and chairman of China Changan Automobile Group. He rose to become chairman of Norincon Group in 2013, serving in the post until his retirement in 2018.

== Downfall ==
On April 4, 2021, he was put under investigation for alleged "serious violations of discipline and laws" by the Central Commission for Discipline Inspection (CCDI), the party's internal disciplinary body, and the National Supervisory Commission, the highest anti-corruption agency of China. On September 30, he was expelled from the Chinese Communist Party. On October 25, he was arrested by the Supreme People's Procuratorate.

Business positions
Preceded by ?	Chairman of Norincon Group; 2013–2018	Succeeded by Jiao Kaihe
