= Bert Weckhuysen =

Belgian chemist (born 1968)

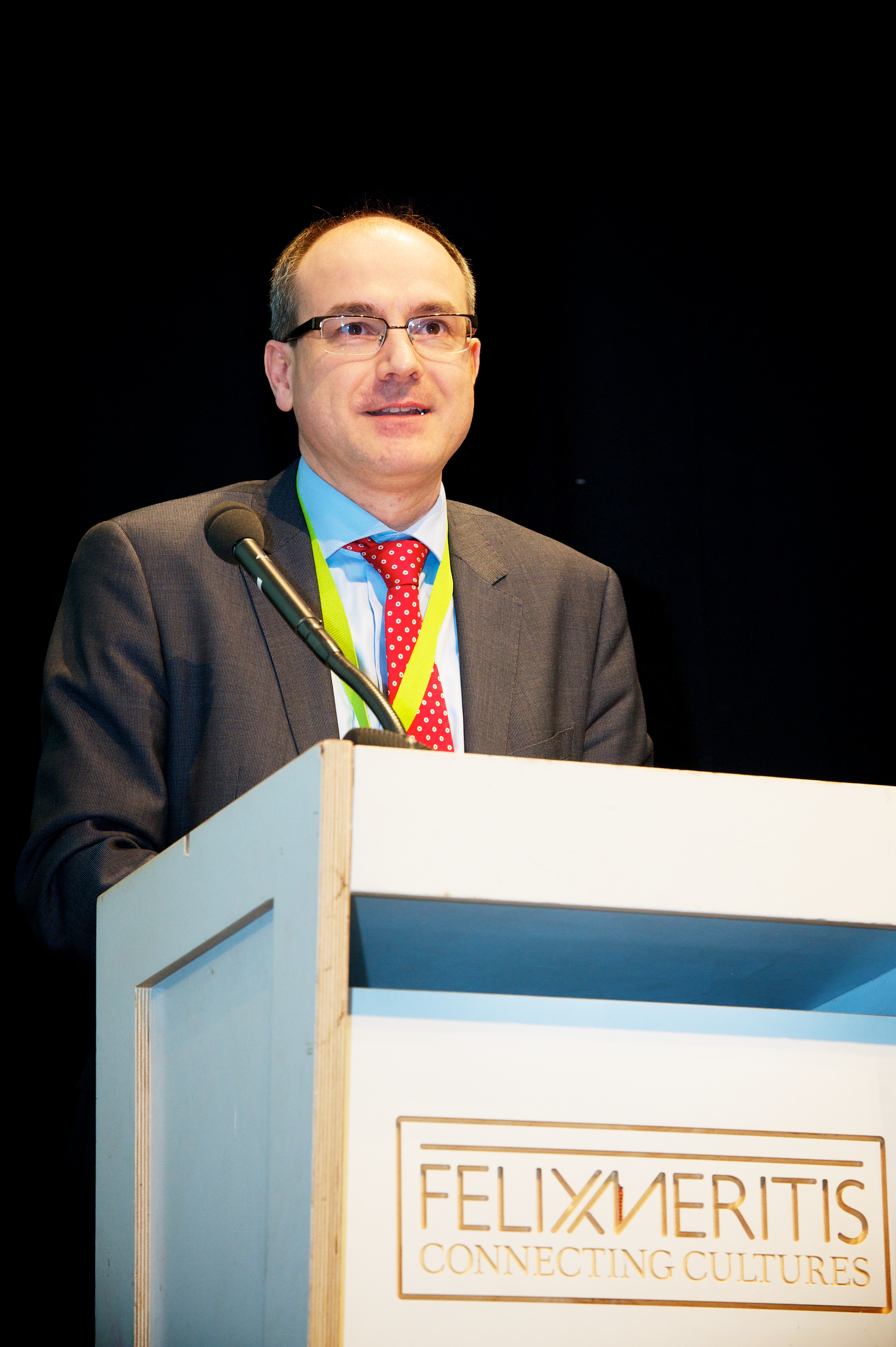
Bert Weckhuysen

Bert Marc Weckhuysen FRSC (born 27 July 1968) is a professor of inorganic chemistry and catalysis at Utrecht University, originally from Belgian descent. Weckhuysen is best known for his developments in operando (micro)spectroscopy; imaging catalysis at macro, meso and micro scales, from the reactor down to interactions between single atoms and molecules. He was a winner of the 2013 Spinoza Prize, and was knighted in the Order of the Netherlands Lion in 2015.

== Biography ==
Weckhuysen was born on 27 July 1968 in Aarschot. He studied chemistry and biology at Leuven. He obtained his PhD in Leuven in 1995 under R. Schoonheydt with his thesis: Oppervlaktechemie van Cr aan anorganische oppervlakken. In 2000 Weckhuysen was appointed as professor of Inorganic Chemistry and Catalysis at Utrecht University.

In 2020 Weckhuysen was head of a commission which wrote a proposal for new scientific funding in the Netherlands. The proposal of the Royal Netherlands Academy of Arts and Sciences was sent to Minister of Education, Culture and Science Ingrid van Engelshoven. He is editor-in-chief of the Catalysis Science and Technology Journal.

== Research consortia ==
Bert Weckhuysen was (one of) the main initiator(s) of several large research program initiatives. For example, he served as scientific director of Catchbio, a 10-year public-private Smartmix partnership programme in the catalytic conversion of biomass chemistry that was announced in 2005.

== Honours and awards ==
In 2006 Weckhuysen received the Royal Netherlands Chemical Society (KNCV) Golden Medal at the age of 37. Since 2011 Weckhuysen is member of the Royal Netherlands Academy of Arts and Sciences. In 2013 he was one of three winners of the Dutch Spinoza Prize and received a 2.5 million euro grant. On 24 April 2015 he was made Knight in the Order of the Netherlands Lion. Weckhuysen is a Fellow of the Royal Society of Chemistry and the American Academy of Arts and Sciences.
