= Casey T. Arrowood =

American lawyer

Personal details
- Education: University of North Carolina at Chapel Hill (BA); Georgetown University (JD)

Military service
- Branch/service: United States Army

Casey Thomas Arrowood is an American lawyer serving as an assistant United States attorney since 2016. He was nominated to serve as the United States attorney for the Eastern District of Tennessee.

== Education ==
Arrowood received a Bachelor of Arts from the University of North Carolina at Chapel Hill in 1999 and a Juris Doctor from Georgetown University Law Center in 2007.

== Military service ==
Arrowood was commissioned as a Second lieutenant in the Field Artillery branch of the U.S. Army in 1999, assigned to the 10th Mountain Division. He deployed to Kosovo in 2001 as part of Operation Joint Guardian. In 2002, Arrowood was promoted to captain and in 2003 deployed to Afghanistan in support of Operation Enduring Freedom.

== Career ==
From 2007 to 2008, Arrowood clerked for Judge Thomas Collier Platt Jr. of the United States District Court for the Eastern District of New York. From 2008 to 2009, he clerked for Judge Eugene Edward Siler Jr. of the United States Court of Appeals for the Sixth Circuit and subsequently became an associate at the law firm Squire Patton Boggs in Washington, D.C. In 2010, Arrowood joined the Counterintelligence and Export Control Section of the National Security Division of the United States Department of Justice. From 2017 to 2018, he served as an assistant United States attorney for the Western District of North Carolina, and since 2018 he has served as an assistant United States attorney in the United States Attorney's Office for the Eastern District of Tennessee.

While serving in the National Security Division, Arrowood led the successful prosecution of Schlumberger, the world's largest oilfield services company, for violating United States sanctions imposed on Iran and Sudan. The prosecution resulted in the highest criminal fine ever imposed at the time under the International Emergency Economic Powers Act. For his work, Arrowood earned the National Security Division's Assistant Attorney General's Award for Excellence, and the United States Department of Commerce Office of Export Enforcement named him an honorary special agent.

As an assistant U.S. attorney, Arrowood prosecuted a Knoxville man accused of providing material support and resources to the Islamic State of Iraq and al-Sham (ISIS), a designated foreign terrorist organization. He previously led the failed prosecution of University of Tennessee professor Anming Hu as part of the China Initiative, which resulted in controversy over FBI conduct towards the defendant. Arrowood also led the prosecution of Mark Thomas Reno, the accused arsonist behind the 2021 fire that destroyed a Planned Parenthood in Knoxville, Tennessee.

=== Nomination as U.S. attorney ===
On July 29, 2022, President Joe Biden announced the nomination of Arrowood to serve as the United States attorney for the Eastern District of Tennessee. His nomination was sent to the United States Senate for consideration by the Senate Judiciary Committee.

Asian American civil rights groups called on supporters to oppose Arrowood's nomination, which they called an "affront to the Asian American, immigrant, and scientific communities." The prosecution of Hu was criticized specifically. Hu said that instead of being punished, Arrowood is being rewarded, encouraging future cases such as his to happen again. Citing Arrowood's handling of the Hu case, the Committee of Concerned Scientists urged the nomination be withdrawn.

Facing opposition stemming from Arrowood's failed prosecution of Anming Hu, the nomination expired at the end of the 117th Congress in January 2023 without being acted upon. Senate aides said the nomination had been stopped in the Judiciary Committee by Senator Mazie Hirono, due to perceived "anti-Asian" racism in the Hu prosecution.
