= Robert A. Schoonheydt =

Belgian research chemist and professor emeritus

Robert A. Schoonheydt (born 4 August 1943) is a Belgian research chemist who, since 2008, has been Professor Emeritus at the Faculty of Bioscience Engineering K. U. Leuven.

== Work ==
Shoonheydt has authored or co-authored over 280 peer-reviewed journal articles, over 40 articles in convergence proceedings, and numerous other scholarly works including 30 book chapters. He wrote (with W. Mortier) Developments in the Theory of Chemical Reactivity and Heterogeneous Catalysis in 1998.
