= Shi Yigong =

Chinese biophysicist (born 1967)

- 施一公
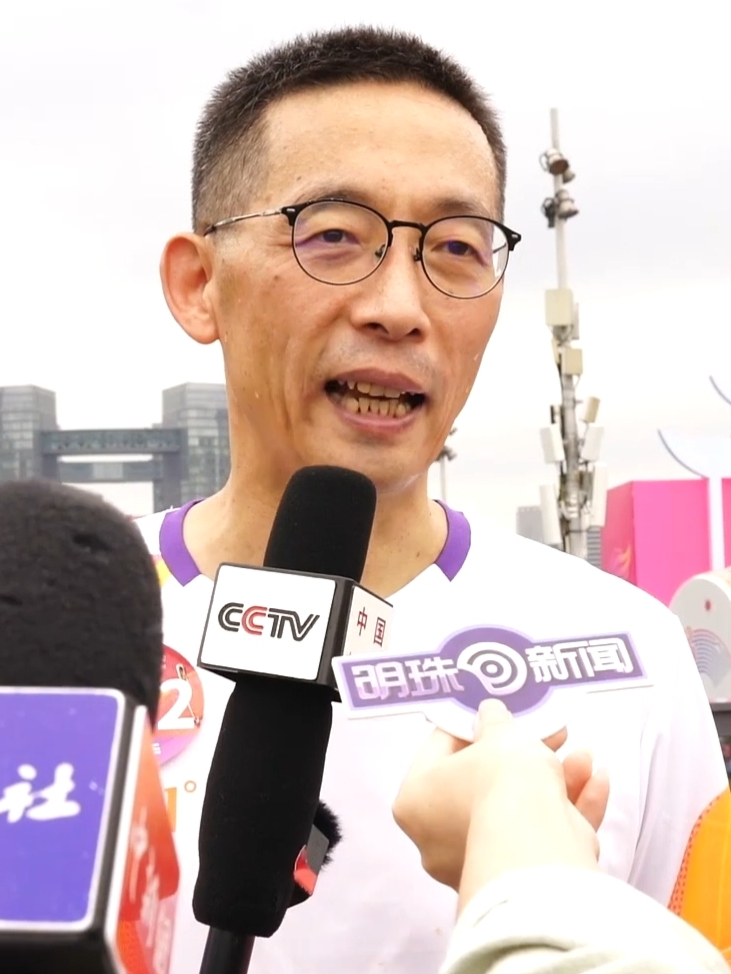
- Shi in 2023
- Born: 5 May 1967 (age 59); Zhengzhou, Henan, China
- Education: Tsinghua University (BS); Johns Hopkins University (PhD)
- Relatives: Shi Ping (grandfather)
- Scientific career
- Fields: Biophysics
- Workplaces: Tsinghua University; Iowa State University; Johns Hopkins University; Princeton University; Westlake University
- Thesis: Molecular mechanisms of zinc finger protein-nucleic acid interactions (1995)
- Doctoral advisor: Jeremy Berg
- Doctoral students: Yan Ning

Chinese name
- Simplified Chinese: 施一公
- Traditional Chinese: 施一公
Transcriptions
Standard Mandarin
- Hanyu Pinyin: Shī Yī Gōng

Shi Yigong (Chinese: 施一公; born 5 May 1967) is a Chinese biophysicist who serves as founding and the current president of Westlake University since April 2018. He previously served as vice president of Tsinghua University from 2015 to 2018 and dean of Tsinghua University School of Life Sciences from 2009 to 2016.

== Education ==
Shi Yigong received a Bachelor of Science with majors in biology and mathematics from Tsinghua University in 1989 and a Doctor of Philosophy in molecular biophysics from Johns Hopkins University in 1995. He studied at Iowa State University for three months in 1990, before transferring to Johns Hopkins University.

During his graduate studies, he determined the crystal structure of several critical apoptotic proteins, including apaf-1, DIAP1, and the BIR3 domain of XIAP.

== Career ==
Shi Yigong was the Warner-Lambert/Parke-Davis Professor in the department of Molecular Biology at Princeton University. In June 2008, he was selected as a Howard Hughes Medical Institute investigator. However, he rejected the award upon resigning his position at Princeton University in order to pursue his career at Tsinghua University, becoming the dean of the School of Life Sciences there. In 2003, he was appointed a Chair Professor of Tsinghua's Department of Biological Sciences and Biotechnology. In late 2007, He was appointed Vice Director of Tsinghua's Institute of Biomedicine and Vice Dean of Tsinghua's Department of Biological Sciences and Biotechnology before returning to China. He was appointed Dean of Tsinghua's School of Life Sciences (replacing the Department of Biological Sciences and Biotechnology) in 2009. In 2018, he became the founding and the first president of Westlake University, a newly established private university in Hangzhou.

Shi renounced his U.S. citizenship in 2011 in order to reclaim his Chinese citizenship.

== Personal life ==
Shi's grandfather was academic and politician Shi Ping. According to Shi, his father, Shi Huailin (施怀琳), was named after his mother Yang Lin (杨琳), who died 18 days after his birth, with 怀琳 literally meaning "remembering Lin". As a result of his grandfather's work commitments, his father was estranged from his grandfather as a child, and friends and family raised his father. Shi's father and grandfather eventually reunited later in life.

His father died on 21 September 1987, at the age of 52.

His grandfather died on 29 June 2024, at the age of 112 years, 241 days.

== Awards ==
- 2020, the Tan Kah Kee Science Award
- 2018, Asian Scientist 100, Asian Scientist
- 2017, Future Science Prize in Life Sciences
- 2016, Ho Leung Ho Lee Award for Achievement in Science and Technology
- 2015, Nature Award for Mentoring in science
- 2014, Gregori Aminoff Prize, from the Royal Swedish Academy of Sciences
- 2013, foreign associate of the US National Academy of Sciences
- 2013, foreign associate of the European Molecular Biology Organization
- 2013, Academician Chinese Academy of Sciences, 中国科学院院士
- 2011, Ray Wu Award from the Chinese Biological Investigators Society
- 2010 Raymond and Beverly Sackler International Prize
- Irving Sigal Young Investigator Award, from the Protein Society
- Searle Scholar Award
- Rita Allen Scholar Award
- 2000, Wilson S. Stone Memorial Award
- 1995, Paul Ehrlich Research Award in Basic Science
