= Xiao-Fan Wang =

Sino-American oncologist (born 1955)

- 王小凡
- Born: 1955 (age 70–71); Ürümqi, Xinjiang, China
- Education: Wuhan University; University of California, Los Angeles; Massachusetts Institute of Technology
- Spouse: Xinnian Dong
- Scientific career
- Fields: Oncology
- Workplaces: Duke University
- Academic advisors: Robert Weinberg

Xiao-Fan Wang (Chinese: 王小凡; pinyin: Wāng Xiǎofán; born 1955) is a Chinese-American oncologist. He is the Donald and Elizabeth Cooke Professor of Cancer Research at Duke University School of Medicine.

== Biography ==
Wang was born in Ürümqi, Xinjiang, China in 1955. His family moved to a village in Henan province in the 1970s, during the Cultural Revolution, his mother was imprisoned by local government for "historical questions". Wang was raised by his paternal grandmother. Before graduating from primary school, he was assigned to work as a worker in a factory for 8 years. After resuming the college entrance examination, he entered Wuhan University, majoring in biochemistry, where he graduated in 1982. After college, he was accepted to the Chinese Academy of Sciences, he attended the China-United States Biochemistry Examination and Application (CUSBEA) and was sent abroad to study at the expense of the Chinese government with his wife Xinnian Dong. Wang earned his doctor's degree in biology from the University of California, Los Angeles in 1986. He did post-doctoral research at the Whitehead Institute for Biomedical Research, Massachusetts Institute of Technology from 1987 to 1992 under Professor Robert Weinberg.

Wang has taught at Duke University since 1992. He was promoted to associate professor in 1992 and to full Professor in 2003.

Wang was elected as a foreign academician of the Chinese Academy of Sciences on November 28, 2017.

== Personal life ==
Wang's father-in-law, Dong Fureng (Chinese: 董辅礽; 1927-2004), was a Chinese-American economist. His mother-in-law, Liu Ainian (Chinese: 刘蔼年), is a Chinese-American ophthalmologist. His wife, Xinnian Dong (Chinese: 董欣年), is a professor at Duke University and an academician of the American Academy of Arts and Sciences and National Academy of Sciences.
