= Westlake University =

Private research university in Hangzhou, China

Coordinates: 30.33041°N 120.03345°E

- 西湖大学
- Former name: Westlake Institute for Advanced Study (2016–2018)
- Type: Private
- Established: 2018; 8 years ago
- Location: Hangzhou, Zhejiang, China
- Website: westlake.edu.cn en.westlake.edu.cn

Chinese name
- Simplified Chinese: 西湖大学
- Traditional Chinese: 西湖大學
Transcriptions
Standard Mandarin
- Hanyu Pinyin: Xīhú Dàxué

Westlake Institute for Advanced Study
- Simplified Chinese: 浙江西湖高等研究院
- Traditional Chinese: 浙江西湖高等研究院
Transcriptions
Standard Mandarin
- Hanyu Pinyin: Zhèjiāng xīhú gāoděng yán jiù yuàn

Westlake University (西湖大学) is a private research university in Hangzhou, Zhejiang, China. It was founded in October 2018.

Westlake University ranked 84th in the world for Nature Index 2021 Young Universities (Leading 150 Young Universities) and 52nd in China for Nature Index 2025. It also ranked #301-400 in Academic Ranking of World Universities 2025 and ranked #308 in U.S. News & World Report Best Global Universities Ranking 2025.

== History ==
The proposal for the establishment of a private research university was submitted on March 11, 2015, by individuals from business and academia, including Shi Yigong, Chen Shiyi, and Pan Jianwei. This initiative led to the creation of WIAS on December 10, 2016, with Shi as president. The Ministry of Education approved the foundation of a university on April 2, 2018. Shi was elected as the university's president at the first board meeting on April 16.

The university was inaugurated in Hangzhou on October 20, 2018. It opened with the Yunqi campus; the Yungu campus began construction in April and Phase 3 campus expansion completed in June 2025.

== Governance System ==
=== Council ===
On April 20, 2018, the University Council was formally established. Dong Qingyuan (董清源) was named the Chairperson of the University Council, Sun Youyou (孙幼幼) the Vice Chairperson of the University Council, and Yang Wenzhu (杨文铸) the Chair of the Committee for Discipline Inspection. As of November 2026, the university lists Qiao Dai as Chair of the Committee for Discipline Inspection.

=== Board of Trustees ===
Westlake University is led by the University President, who operates under the guidance of the board of trustees. The Board of Trustees consists of educators and scholars from China and overseas, representatives of donors and representatives of the government, making decisions on major issues such as the strategic planning of the university. It also appoints the University President which executes the decisions of the board of trustees.

- Honorary Chair: Yang Chen-Ning, Nobel Laureate in Physics and Academician of the Chinese Academy of Sciences
- Chair: Yingyi Qian, Dean of the School of Economics and Management and Professor at Tsinghua University

=== Administration ===
As of November 2026, the university's president is Yigong Shi, and its vice presidents are Min Qiu, Xiaoyun Zhu, Li Deng, Chen Dong, and Jianjun Cheng.

== Academics ==
The university's faculties are the School of Life Sciences, the School of Science, the School of Engineering, and the School of Medicine.

=== World Directory of Medical Schools (WDOMS) ===
As of 2026, Westlake University's clinical medicine program is not listed in the World Directory of Medical Schools (WDOMS), meaning its students are currently unable to register for United States medical licensing examinations (USMLE).

=== Rankings and reputation ===
University rankings

Global – Overall
- ARWU World: 301-400 (2025)
- USNWR Global: 308 (2025)

Regional – Overall
- USNWR Asia: 72 (2025)

National – Overall
- USNWR National: 44 (2025)

Westlake University was ranked 52nd in China and 124th globally in Nature Index 2025.

==== Academic Ranking of World Universities (Shanghai Ranking) ====
Year	Rank	Valuer
2023	501-600	Academic Ranking of World Universities
2024	501-600	Academic Ranking of World Universities
2025	301-400	Academic Ranking of World Universities

==== Nature Index ====
Nature Index tracks the affiliations of high-quality scientific articles and presents research outputs by institution and country on monthly basis.

Year	Rank	Valuer
2021	84	Nature Index 2021 Young Universities (Leading 150 Young Universities)
2023	265	Nature Index - Academic Institutions - Global
2023	74	Nature Index - Academic Institutions - China
2025	124	Nature Index - Academic Institutions - Global
2025	52	Nature Index - Academic Institutions - China

==== U.S. News & World Report Best Global Universities Ranking ====
Year	Rank	Valuer
2025	308	U.S. News & World Report Best Global University Ranking

== Campus and Campus Life ==
Westlake University is located in Xihu District, Hangzhou, Zhejiang Province in China.

=== Yungu Campus ===
The Yungu Campus is located in the Yungu Block of Zijingang Science and Technology City in Xihu District. The circular center of the campus is the "academic loop" for the university's administrative and academic heart, including a large "c"-shaped faculty building. The "residential loop" fills the campus perimeter, and contains residences and other personnel support facilities. The loops are separated by a moat crossed by 12 bridges.

=== Yunqi Campus ===
The Yunqi Campus is located in Yunqi Town, in the southern part of Xihu District of Hangzhou, Zhejiang Province, China. This interim campus satisfies the basic needs of Westlake University in its initial stages.

Covering an area of 11.5 acres with a total construction space of 106,000 m^{2}, the Yunqi Campus consists of four research buildings, one administrative building and two student residence halls, which were put into operation in March 2017. The Yunqi Campus features a small sports field with a basketball court and fitness equipment, a gym, a two-floor dining hall, a café and a campus store. Furthermore, a running track along the campus border has been laid in 2019. Regular leisure activities are organized by different clubs, the Union of Faculty and Staff and the Office of Academic Services and Student Affairs.
