= List of Fudan University people =

This is a list of people associated with Fudan University in Shanghai, China.

== Government and politics ==
- Wang Huning, Member of the 19th, 20th Politburo Standing Committee, Chairman of the CPPCC, First Secretary of the Party Secretariat.
- Han Zheng, Member of the 19th Politburo Standing Committee, Vice Premier of China, Vice President of China.
- Li Lanqing, Member of the 15th Politburo Standing Committee, Vice Premier of China.
- Ding Xuexiang, Member of the 20th Politburo Standing Committee, Director of the General Office of the CPC, Secretary of the Party Secretariat.
- Li Yuanchao, Member of the 17th, 18th Politburo, Vice President of China.
- Han Qide, Vice Chairperson of the NPC, Vice Chairman of the CPPCC, Chairman of the Jiusan Society, Academician of CAS.
- Sang Guowei, Vice Chairperson of the NPC, Chairman of the Chinese Peasants' and Workers' Democratic Party, Academician of CAE.
- Chen Zhili, Vice Chairperson of the NPC, Minister of Education of PRC, President of the ACWF.
- Cai Dafeng, Vice Chairperson of the NPC, Chairman of the China Association for Promoting Democracy.
- Zhou Gucheng, Vice Chairperson of the NPC, historian
- Wang Jiarui, Vice Chairman of the CPPCC.
- Tang Jiaxuan (唐家璇), Minister of Foreign Affairs.
- Jiang Jufeng (蒋巨峰), Governor of Sichuan Province.
- Liang Baohua (梁保华), Governor of Jiangsu Province.
- Wang Wentao (王文涛), Governor of Heilongjiang Province.
- Bagatur (巴特尔), Governor of Inner Mongolia.
- Zhang Zhirang (张志让), Federal Judge of PRC.
- Chen Jian (陈健), Vice Secretary-General of United Nations.
- Nie Chenxi (聂辰席), director and Party branch secretary of National Radio and Television Administration and deputy director of Publicity Department of CPC
- Jiang Mianheng (江绵恒), Vice President of the Chinese Academy of Sciences, first President of Shanghai Tech University
- Shao Lizi (邵力子), notable politician, democrat.
- Yu Youren (于右任), President of the Control Yuan of Republic of China.
- Lee Huan (李焕), Premier of the Republic of China.
- Yu Ching-tang (余井塘), Vice Premier of the Republic of China.
- Juliana Young Koo (严幼韵), diplomatist
- Li Dongsheng (李东生)，Minister of Public Security
- Wu Songgao (1898–1953), Republic of China politician, jurist and political scientist
- Gong Xueping (龚学平), Vice Mayor of Shanghai

== Humanities ==
- Chen Yinke (陈寅恪), sinologist, linguist, poet, historian
- Chen Wangdao (陈望道), linguist, educator
- Xu Beihong (徐悲鸿), painter, educator
- Yan Fu (严复), notable Chinese scholar, translator
- Wu Lifu (伍蠡甫), traditional Chinese painter, translator, writer, poet, literary critic
- Wang Anyi (王安忆), novelist, 2000 Mao Dun Literature Prize winner
- Wang Huo (王火), novelist and screenwriter, 1997 Mao Dun Literature Prize winner
- Liang Xiaosheng (梁晓声), novelist and screenwriter, 2019 Mao Dun Literature Prize winner
- Chen Sihe (陈思和), literary critic
- Hong Ying (虹影), writer, poet
- Li Wenjun (李文俊), translator, proser, writer
- Xia Zhengnong (夏征农), writer, chief editor of Chinese encyclopedia Cihai.
- Eugene Yuejin Wang (汪悦进), sinologist, Abby Aldrich Rockefeller Professor of Asian Art, Harvard University
- Charles Burton (黄承安), sinologist, former Canadian diplomat and senior Government advisor
- Liam D'Arcy Brown, a notable British sinologist, travel-writer
- Luo Jialun (罗家伦), educator, historian, diplomat, and political activist. First President of National Tsing Hua University. President of National Central University
- Qiu Xigui (裘锡圭), historian and palaeographer
- Tang Zhijun (汤志钧), historian
- Ge Jianxiong (葛剑雄), historical geographer
- Ge Zhaoguang (葛兆光), historian
- Lu Li'an (卢丽安), scholar of English literature and politician of Taiwanese origin
- Qian Wenzhong (钱文忠), historian, Tibetologist, Indologist
- Xu Fancheng (徐梵澄), philosopher, Indologist, poet, painter
- Yang Hengjun, writer, blogger

== Social sciences ==
- Wang Tieya (王铁崖), eminent Chinese jurist
- Hanming Fang (方汉明), economist, University of Pennsylvania
- Yingyao Hu (胡颖尧), Chinese-American economist, Johns Hopkins University
- Panle Jia (贾攀乐), economist, Cornell University
- Wei Jiang (姜纬), economist, Columbia University
- Zheng (Michael) Song (宋铮), economist, Chinese University of Hong Kong
- Shang-Jin Wei (魏尚进), economist, Columbia University
- Wu Jinglian (吴敬琏), economist
- Lin Zhou (周林), economist, Shanghai Jiaotong University; Fellow of Econometric Society
- Yihong Xia (夏一红), economist, Wharton School, University of Pennsylvania
- Hua He (何华), economist, Yale University
- Xunyu Zhou (周迅宇), economist, Columbia University
- Yusheng Zheng (郑渝生), economist, Wharton School
- Luqiu Luwei (闾丘露薇), journalist
- Lode Li (李乐德), management scientist, member of the Institute of Operations Research and the Management Sciences, Yale University
- David D. Yao (姚大卫 Yao Dawei), professor of Operations Research at Columbia University.
- Ying Natasha Zhang (Natasha Foutz), professor of management at the R.H Smith School of Business, University of Maryland
- Xueguang Zhou (周雪光), sociologist, Stanford University
- Dingxin Zhao (赵鼎新), sociologist, University of Chicago
- Jing Yang, economist, Bank of Canada
  - Shu Yang, Chinese-American materials scientist, University of Pennsylvania
- Ma Jun (马骏), Chief Economist, PBOC (Central Bank of China)

== Natural sciences and mathematics ==
- Zhu Kezhen (竺可桢), meteorologist, educator, PhD from Harvard University
- Shoucheng Zhang (张守晟), physicist, professor at Stanford University.
- Shen Zhi-Xun (沈志勋), physicist, professor at Stanford University.
- Fujia Yang (杨福家 Yang Fujia), physicist and university administrator, the chancellor of the University of Nottingham.
- Li Ta-tsien (李大潜 Li Daqian), mathematician and member of the French Academy of Sciences.
- Li Jun (李俊), mathematician, professor at Stanford University.
- Chen Dayue (陈大岳), mathematician and statistician, professor at Peking University.
- Xiao-Li Meng (孟晓犁), mathematician and statistician, chair professor at Harvard University
- Jianqing Fan (范剑青), statistician, Princeton University
- Zhiliang Ying (应志良), co-chair of the Statistics Department at Columbia University
- Xuming He, statistician, University of Michigan
- Tong Dizhou (童第周), biologist.
- Rao Yi (饶毅), neurobiologist, Peking University
- Lu Bai (鲁白), neurobiologist, Tsinghua University
- Yibin Kang (康毅滨), Warner-Lambert/Parke-Davis Professor of Molecular Biology at Princeton University
- Shi Yang (施扬), biologist, Harvard Medical School
- Junying Yuan, biologist, professor at Harvard University.
- Xu Tian (许田), biologist, professor at Yale University.
- Wei Yang, biologist, senior investigator at NIH.
- Jian Ma (马坚), computer scientist and computational biologist, Ray and Stephanie Lane Professor of Computational Biology in the School of Computer Science at Carnegie Mellon University.
- Zucai Suo, biochemist, professor at Ohio State University.
- Zhaojun Bai (柏兆俊), mathematician and computer scientist at University of California, Davis

== Education ==
- Luo Jialun (罗家伦), President of Tsinghua University and National Central University.
- Wu Nanxuan (吴南轩), President of Tsinghua University, Fudan University, and Yingshi University
- Zhu Kezhen (竺可桢), President of Zhejiang University.
- Cheng Tien-fong (程天放), President of Zhejiang University, Anhui University, and Sichuan University.
- Zing-Yang Kuo (郭任远), President of Zhejiang University.
- Chen Xujing (陈序经), President of Jinan University and Lingnan University, Vice President of Nankai University and Sun Yat-sen University.
- Hu Dunfu (胡敦复), President of Utopia University.
- Huang Jilu (黄季陆), President of Sichuan University.
- Cao Huiqun (曹惠群), President of Utopia University.
- Joseph K. Twanmoh (端木愷), President of Anhui University and Soochow University
- Xu Xinwu (许心武), President of Henan University

== Medicine ==
- Li Ding, professor at Washington University in St. Louis
- Chen Zhongwei, expert of orthopedic surgery and microsurgery, one of the pioneers of the process of reattaching severed limbs.
- Shen Ziyin (沈自尹)
- Gu Yudong (顾玉东)
- Tang Zhaoyou (汤钊猷)
- Tang Yuhan, oncologist, president of Hong Kong Chinese Medical Association and the founder of Tang Fund
- Chen Haozhu (陈灏珠)
- Wen Yumei (闻玉梅), virologist and microbiologist.
- Zhou Liangfu (周良辅), neurosurgeon
- Jingyuan Wen, professor of pharmacy in New Zealand

== Business ==
- David Ji (born 1952), Chinese-American electronics entrepreneur who co-founded Apex Digital, and was held against his will in China for months without charges during a business dispute
- Zhang Shengman (章晟曼), managing director of World Bank Group
- Zhu Min (朱民), Deputy managing director of the International Monetary Fund
- Li Dak-sum (李达三), GBM, JP, Hong Kong entrepreneur, philanthropist
- Thomas Tseng-tao Chen (陈曾焘), CBE, Hong Kong entrepreneur, Chairman of Hang Lung Group
- Guo Guangchang (郭广昌), chairman of Fosun International Limited and the representative of 12th Chinese People's Political Consultative Conference
- Lu Zhiqiang (卢志强), billionaire property developer
- Chen Tianqiao (陈天桥), former China's richest man, founder, and CEO of SNDA Co& (Nasdaq: snda)
- Eric X. Li (李世默), founder of Chengwei Capital
- Cao Guowei (曹国伟), CEO of Sina
- Wang Changtian (王长田), Founder and CEO of Enlight Media
- Qi Lu (陆奇), Chinese-American President of the Online Services Group, Microsoft and former Executive Vice President of Engineering for the Search and Advertising Technology Group at Yahoo!
- Yan Huo (霍焱), founder of Capula Investment Management
- Liang Jianzhang (梁建章), Chinese-American founder and CEO of Ctrip
- Xiaohu Zhu (朱啸虎), managing director at GSR Ventures Management
- Jianhang Jin (金建杭), President of Alibaba Group
- Fan Jiang (蒋凡), President of Taobao, President & Board Chairman of Tmall
- Jane Zhang (investor), entrepreneur and a Chinese angel investor from Shanghai.
- Ji Shisan (姬十三), CEO and founder of Guokr (果壳网)
- Guo Guangchang (郭廣昌), founder and chairman of Fosun International Limited

== Entertainment ==
- Shang Wenjie (尚雯婕), singer
- Jiang Changjian (蒋昌建), host
- Lao Fanqie (老番茄), blogger
- Afu Thomas (Thomas Derksen), German internet personality in China
- Amy Lyons, Australian internet personality in China, did a student exchange term at Fudan

== Notable professors ==
- Ma Yinchu (马寅初 1882–1982), economist
- Yan Fuqing (颜福庆 1882–1970), Chinese public health pioneer
- Lu Simian (吕思勉 1884–1957), historian
- Gu Jiegang (顾颉刚 1893–1980), historian
- Su Buqing (苏步青 1902–2003), mathematician
- Chen Jiangong (陈建功), mathematician
- Zhou Gucheng (周谷城), historian and social activist
- Wu Lifu (伍蠡甫), translator, painter
- Wang Fushan (王福山), physicist, Heisenberg's graduate student
- Zhou Tongqing (周同庆), physicist
- Liang Zongdai (梁宗岱)
- Tan Jiazhen (谈家桢), geneticist who established the first genetics program in China
- Xie Xide (谢希德 1921–2000), physicist
- Lu Hefu (卢鹤绂), physicist
- Gu Yidong (顾翼东 1903–1996), chemist
- Gu Chaohao (谷超豪), mathematician
- Tan Qixiang (谭其骧), historian.
- Qiu Xigui (裘锡圭), historian and palaeographer
- Yan Su (颜苏), Professor of Law
- Zhao Jingshen (赵景深), popular Chinese novelist
- Xia Daoxing (夏道行), mathematician
- Wang Weiqi (王威琪), professor of biomedical engineering
- Lu Gusun (陆谷孙), lexicography master
- Ge Chuangui (葛传槼), linguist
- Lin Tongji (林同济), linguist
- Dong Wenqiao (董问樵), famed translator
- Yang Qishen (杨岂深), famed translator
- Zhang Yongzhen (张永振), virologist
- Chen Sihe (陈思和), professor of modern Chinese literature
- Wang Anyi (王安忆), famous Chinese writer
- Chen Shangjun (陈尚君), professor of ancient Chinese literature
- Jin Yaqiu (金亚秋), professor of electrical engineering
- Jin Li (金力), professor of Evolutionary Genetics.
- Feng Donglai, Physicist
- Mao Ying (毛颖), professor of Neurosurgery
- Wu Jinsong (吴劲松), professor of Neurosurgery
- Chen Zhimin (陈志敏), Political Scientist
- Wang Defeng (王德峰), professor of Philosophy
- Swee-Huat Lee, Distinguished Professor at Fudan University.
- Chunyang Hu, professor of communications
