= ShanghaiTech University =

Public university in Shanghai, China

- 上海科技大学
- Type: Public
- Established: September 30, 2013; 13 years ago
- President: Feng Donglai
- Faculty: 150 Tenure Track Professors, 293 Adjunct Professors
- Undergraduates: 1201
- Postgraduates: 1499
- Doctoral students: 400
- Location: Shanghai, China; 31°10′46″N 121°35′26″E
- Campus: 393 Middle Huaxia Road, Pudong, Shanghai, 201210
- Language: English and Chinese
- Website: shanghaitech.edu.cn

Chinese name
- Simplified Chinese: 上海科技大学
- Traditional Chinese: 上海科技大學
Transcriptions
Standard Mandarin
- Hanyu Pinyin: Shànghǎi Kējì Dàxué

ShanghaiTech University is a municipal public science and engineering university in Pudong, Shanghai, China. The university was founded in 2013 by contracts between the Shanghai Municipal People's Government and the Chinese Academy of Sciences. The university is part of the Double First-Class Construction. It is ranked #301-400 in the world by Shanghai Ranking, #330 by U.S. News & World Report, and #535 by CWUR rankings.

The university has five schools and three research institutes. In 2018, it had 1433 undergraduates, 1788 Master's and PhD students, and 485 faculty members.

== Timeline ==
- February 2022: Shanghai Tech became a Chinese state Double First Class University.
- December 2016: Shanghai Tech finished its move to the new campus.
- Spring 2016: The first batch of master students graduated from ShanghaiTech University.
- September 30, 2014: ShanghaiTech's first 207 undergraduate students started their first day of the 2014 semester.
- February 2014: ShanghaiTech Founding President Jiang Mianheng and University Council Chairman Zhu Zhiyuan were inaugurated.
- January 24, 2014: China's Ministry of Education approved ShanghaiTech's 2014 undergraduate enrollment plan.
- September 30, 2013: China's Ministry of Education approved the official establishment of ShanghaiTech University.
- September 3, 2013: ShanghaiTech's first 296 graduate students started their first day.
- December 28, 2012: ShanghaiTech University laid its foundation in Pudong Science and Technology Park.
- April 28, 2012: China's Ministry of Education approved the planning for ShanghaiTech University.
- May 23, 2011: Shanghai Municipal Government and Chinese Academy of Sciences decided to jointly form the ShanghaiTech Development Steering Group and the ShanghaiTech Development Working Group.
- September 26, 2008: The Chinese Academy of Sciences (CAS) and the Shanghai Municipal Government signed a Broad Collaboration Agreement to jointly establish the Shanghai Pudong Science and Technology Park of CAS, the Shanghai Advanced Research Institute (SARI) of CAS, and a research university.
- June 23, 2004: Shanghai Municipal Government and Chinese Academy of Sciences (CAS) initiated the planning of a research university in Pudong New Area.

The school was founded by the Shanghai municipal government and Chinese Academy of Sciences. In 2014 Jiang Mianheng, the son of former CCP General Secretary Jiang Zemin, became president of the ShanghaiTech University. Before his death in December 2018, Zhang Shoucheng was a professor at ShanghaiTech University.

== Schools and institutes ==
The university has five schools in operation:

- School of Physical Science and Technology Dean: Peidong Yang
- School of Information Science and Technology Dean: Cher Wang
- School of Life Science and Technology Dean: Haifan Lin
- School of Entrepreneurship and Management Dean: Hanming Fang
- School of Art and Creativity

ShanghaiTech has two research institutes:

- Shanghai Institute for Advanced Immunochemical Studies Director: Richard A. Lerner
- iHuman Institute Director: Raymond C. Stevens

=== School of Physical Science and Technology ===
The School of Physical Science and Technology offers bachelor, master and PhD degrees in physics, astronomy, chemistry, material science and technology and energyenvironmentalnment science.

The research of the school is concentrating on:

- Material discovery, design and synthesis (materials chemistry, biomaterials, synthesis and process, catalysis, nanometer, polymer, surface science, solid state chemistry, soft and hard material interface, environmental sensing and recovery materials).
- Condensed matter and material physics (experimental and theoretical condensed matter physics, physical behavior of materials, electronic materials, energy storage materials, low-dimensional materials, quantum materials, metamaterials, materials theory)
- Spectroscopy and Instrumentation Science (Ultrafast Spectroscopy, Scattering and Microscopy, Electron Beam and Scanning Probe Technology and Instruments, Ultrafast Materials Science, In Situ Electron Microscopy, In Situ Ultrafast Spectroscopy, Sensing and Detection)
- Material Engineering

=== School of Information Science and Technology ===
The School of Information Science and Technology offers two bachelor's degrees: Computer Science and 'Electrical and Information Engineering' and Master and PhD degrees in four directions: Computing Theory and Software, Computer Systems and Applications, Information Theory and Systems, Electronic Devices and Integrated Systems.

The research of the school is concentrated in seven research centers:

- Post-Moore Microelectronics and Integrated Circuit Center: Research on the next-generation Integrated Circuit technologies by investigating lower-power and higher-performance innovations from the fundamental device physics to the computer architecture level.
- Data Science and Machine Intelligence Center: Research on basic mathematics and statistical theory of high dimensional data analysis, efficient and extensible machine learning algorithms, intelligent data acquisition devices and equipment, parallel distributed computer systems and software development platforms, and applications of image, video, text, speech, bioinformatics and other aspects.
- Virtual Reality and Visual Computing Center: Aims to realize indistinguishable virtual reality contents from the perspectives of fundamental research core techniques in light field acquisition, storage, processing, rendering and display. Research on capturing, processing and tele-presence of 360-degree 3D dynamic real scenes up to the human-eye resolution.
- Center for Advanced Power and Energy Systems (CAPES): CAPES at ShanghaiTech aims to integrate the cutting-edge technologies including distributed microgrid, smart grid, plug-in electric vehicle, internet of things, and big data; and to comprehensively optimize the whole process of power generation, energy storage, power distribution and utilization.
- ShanghaiTech Automation and Robotics Center (STAR Center): The STAR Center is working on Intelligent Algorithms, Software and Systems for Advanced Research and Applications in Automation and Robotics. It combines areas like Computer Science and Artificial Intelligence, Control and Optimization, Computer Vision and Mechanical and Electrical Engineering.
- Computer System Security Center: The center researches on scalable, reliable, secure systems, with an emphasis on mobile computing and security, Internet of Things security, software security, cryptography and formal verification.
- Network scIence CentEr (NICE): Work on network communication, network security, cloud storage, network information processing and massive MIMO signal processing.

=== School of Life Science and Technology ===
The School of Life Science and Technology conducts teaching and research in all fundamental areas of life science. Its research is focused on, but not limited to, genomics and proteomics, epigenetics, RNA biology, systems biology, stem cell biology and regenerative medicine, super-resolution microscopy, chemical biology and drug discovery, and translational medicine.

=== School of Entrepreneurship and Management ===
The School of Entrepreneurship and Management does not offer degrees but instead teaches all students of ShanghaiTech University in creativity and creative confidence, critical-thinking and about skills which leads to learning how to innovate. Among others, courses are taught on Economics and Design Thinking.

=== School of Creative Arts ===
The School of Creative Arts offers no degrees but it offers a non-diploma course with the University of South California and is planning to offer students art courses and lectures. The dean of SCA is Li Ruigang, the former president of the Shanghai Media Group and the chairman of China Media Capital. The vice dean is John McIntosh, former chair of Computer Art in SVA, New York.

=== Shanghai Institute for Advanced Immunochemical Studies ===
The Shanghai Institute for Advanced Immunochemical Studies is performing antibody and immunochemistry research, dedicated to the understanding of the basic structure and design of biological molecules. It has eight key laboratories in the fields of antibody design, ADC chemistry, phenotypic screening, structure biochemistry, cell biology, stem cell biology, antibody engineering and antibody structure, covering all the capabilities that one needs to go from discovery of an important antibody through all the steps necessary to turn it into a drug. Besides, seven large technical platforms including cell sorting, imaging, protein and gene, HTS, informatics, analytical and animal sciences are also being developed. Nobel laureate James Rothman is a Professor-in-Residence of SIAIS.

=== iHuman Institute ===
The iHuman Institute focused exclusively on the basic and applied science of human cell signaling, with research groups in the fields of Chemical and Cell Biology, Chemistry, Antibody Development, Computational Chemistry, Imaging, Structural Biology, System Biology, and Translational Biology. Basic science is at the core of the iHuman Institute, with direct application to drug discovery. Raymond C. Stevens is the director of the iHuman Institute and Nobel laureate Kurt Wüthrich is leading the iHuman research group on Molecular Structural Biology.

== Campus ==
The ShanghaiTech campus is located in the Zhangjiang Hi-Tech Park, amongst many national and international R&D-based companies. The university is in very close proximity to the Shanghai Synchrotron Radiation Facility, the Shanghai Advanced Research Institute and the National Center for Protein Science Shanghai. The campus was designed by Moore Ruble Yudell Architects and won the Merit Award for Urban Design Award 2012 of the American Institute of Architects, California Council. With 0.6 square kilometer and a construction area of 701,500 square meters the campus represents investments of the Shanghai Municipal Government of 4.169 billion CNY.

== Academics ==
The low student-to-faculty ratio of at most 12 to 1 is hoped to ensure teaching quality. When the school opened, it had plans to enroll 2,000 undergraduate students and 4,000 graduate students immediately. In the future, ShanghaiTech aims to host 1000 faculty, including 500 adjunct professors from institutes of the Chinese Academy of Sciences and other universities. The university will then educate 2000 undergraduate and 4000 graduate students (including 3,000 Ph.D. candidates).

ShanghaiTech hosts four nobel laureates. Roger D. Kornberg and Kurt Wüthrich have both been professors, as has James E. Rothman, 2013 Nobel Prize in Physiology or Medicine.

=== Undergraduate program ===
The four year undergraduate program at ShanghaiTech University has 3 semesters (fall, spring and summer) per school year. The summer semester is mainly for course projects, with music and painting courses available.

== Research ==
By 2017, the school had 145 research teams.

A research team at the school found "cerium can capture sunlight and cause a light-catalyzed reaction." The team then "developed a catalyst combination of cerium and alcohol, which can convert methane into fuel at room temperature, with no need of heat or condensation."

The school is involved with studying artificial intelligence. In September 2018, researchers at the school published an article saying they had successfully replaced genetic material in a human embryo that caused Marfan syndrome.

A team at the school also "exploited the natural secretion of amyloid fibres from the bacterium bacillus subtilis for 3D printing to produce customized nanoscale biomaterials."

== Rankings ==
=== Nature Index ===
Nature Index tracks the affiliations of high-quality scientific articles and presents research outputs by institution and country on monthly basis.

Year	Rank	Valuer
2021	12	Nature Index 2021 Young Universities (Leading 150 Young Universities)
2022	48	Nature Index 2022 - Academic Institutions - China
2022	247	Nature Index 2022 - Leading 500 institutions by patent influence metric
2023	158	Nature Index - Academic Institutions - Global
2023	46	Nature Index 2023 - Academic Institutions - China

== Gallery ==
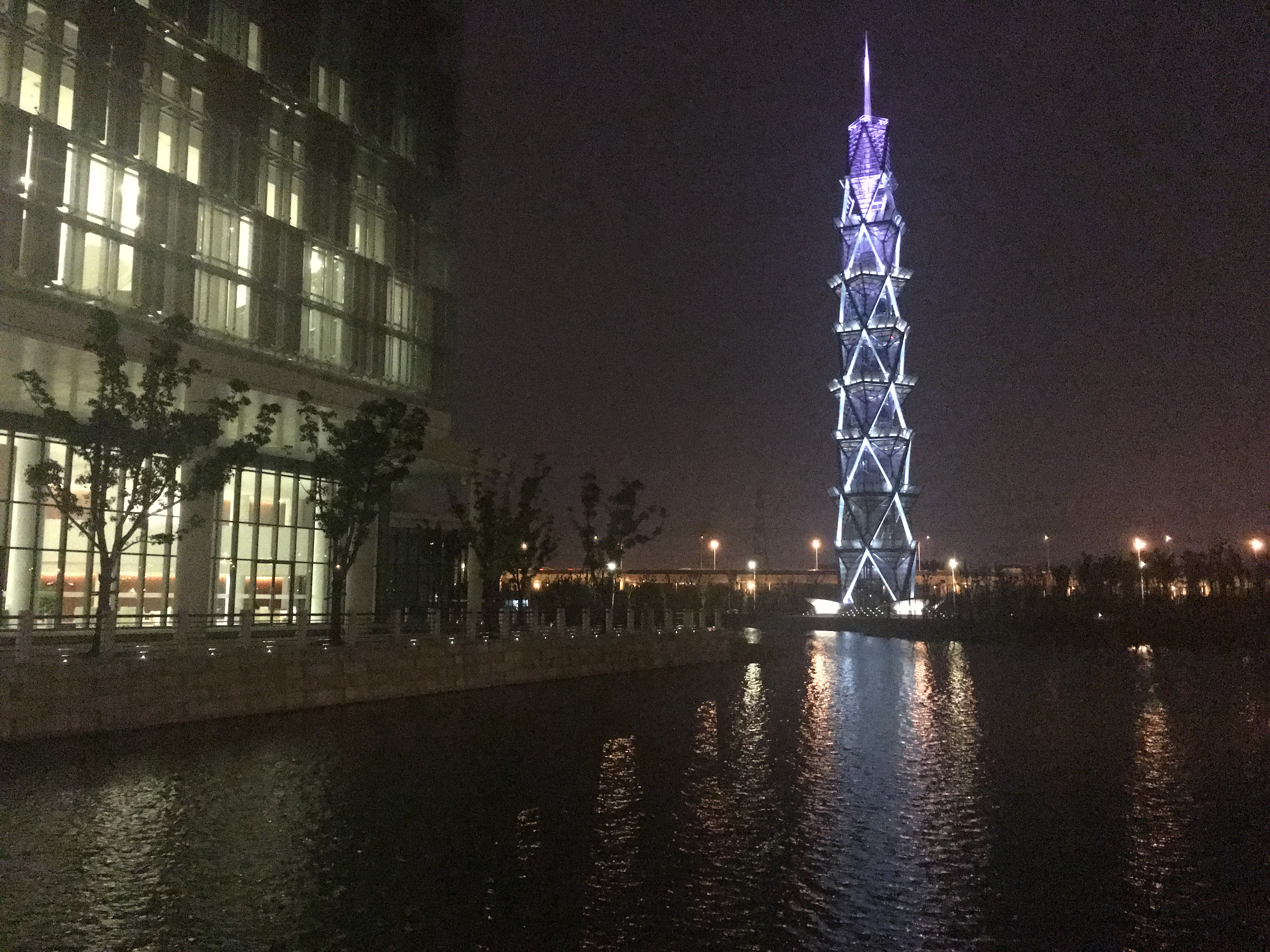
The Tower of ShanghaiTech at night. The library is partially in view on the left.

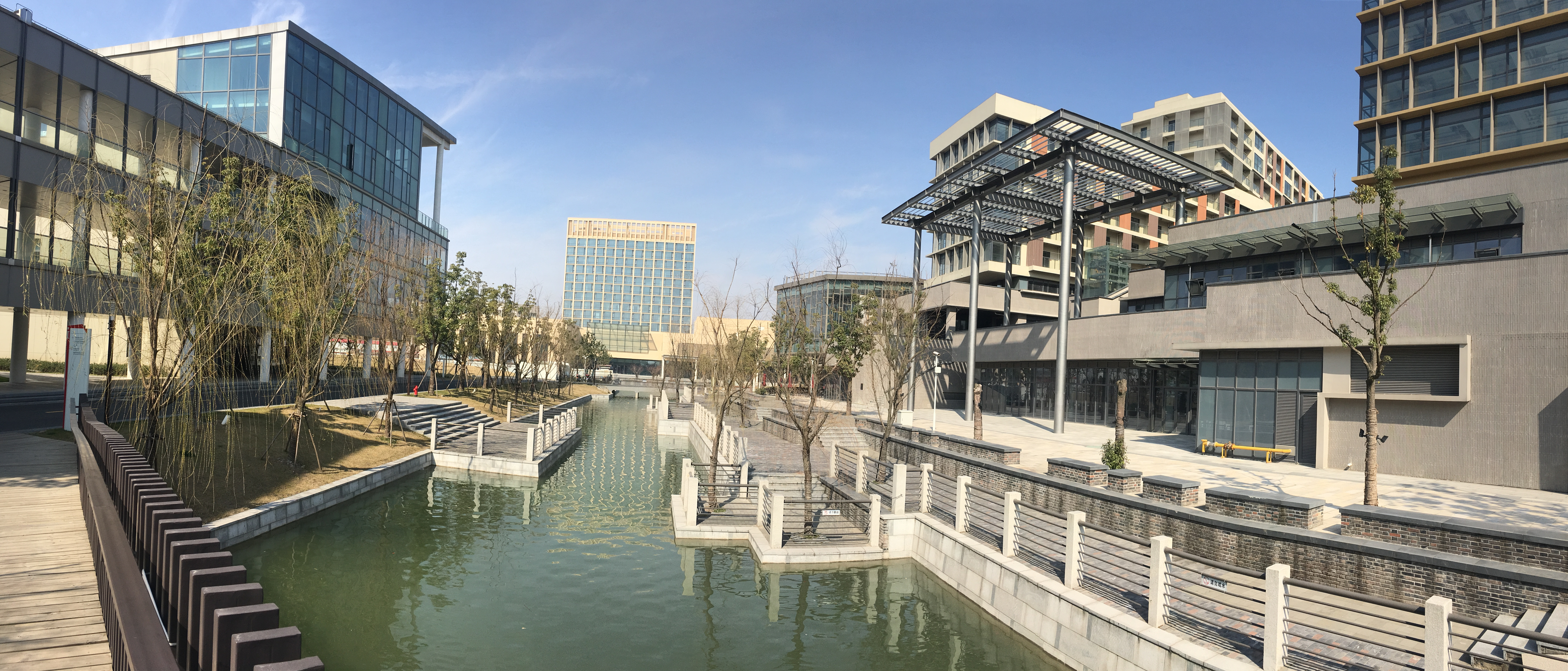
The Conference Center of ShanghaiTech University, which will also host a 5-star hotel and swimming facilities.

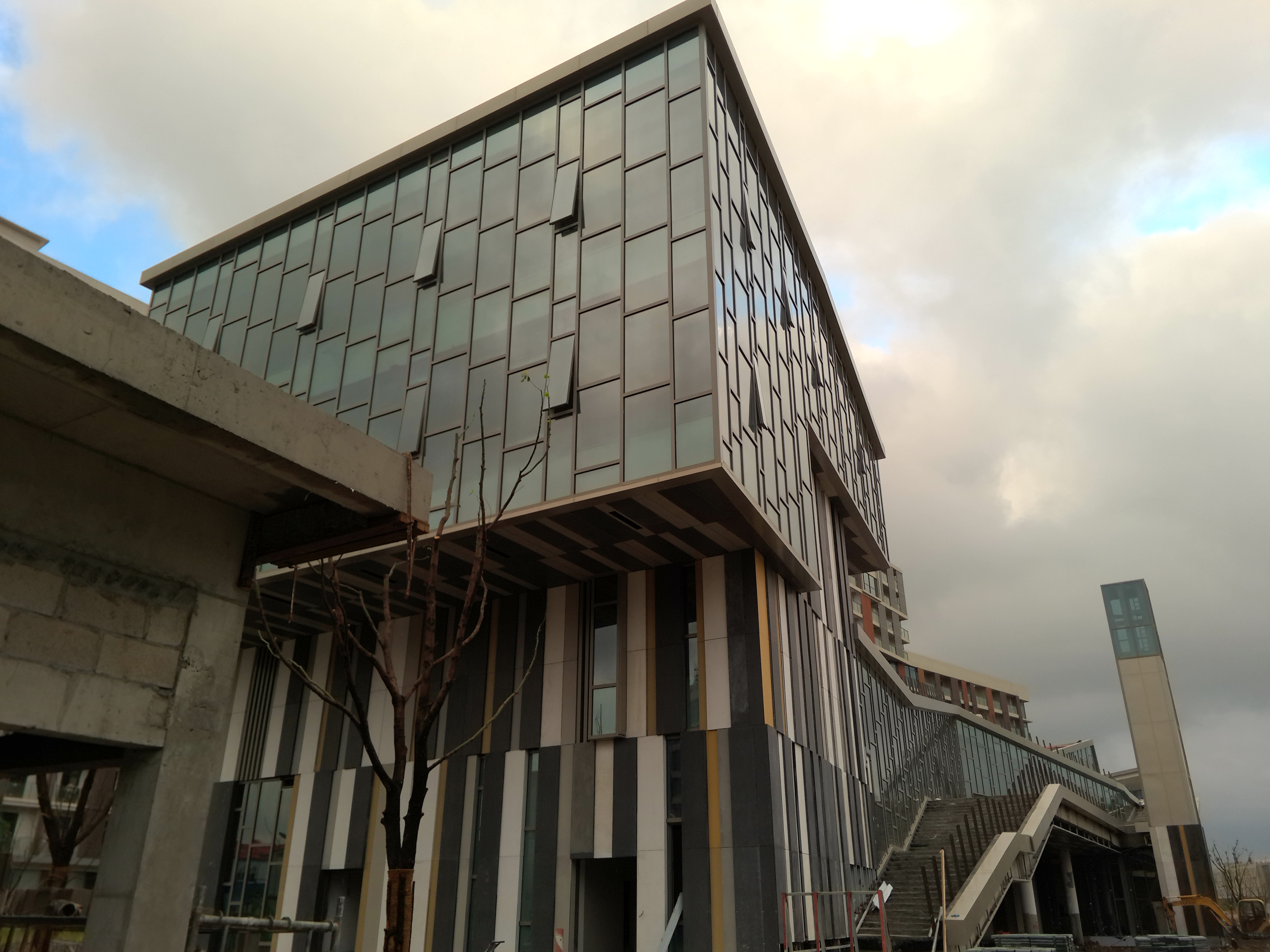
The Student Activity Center.

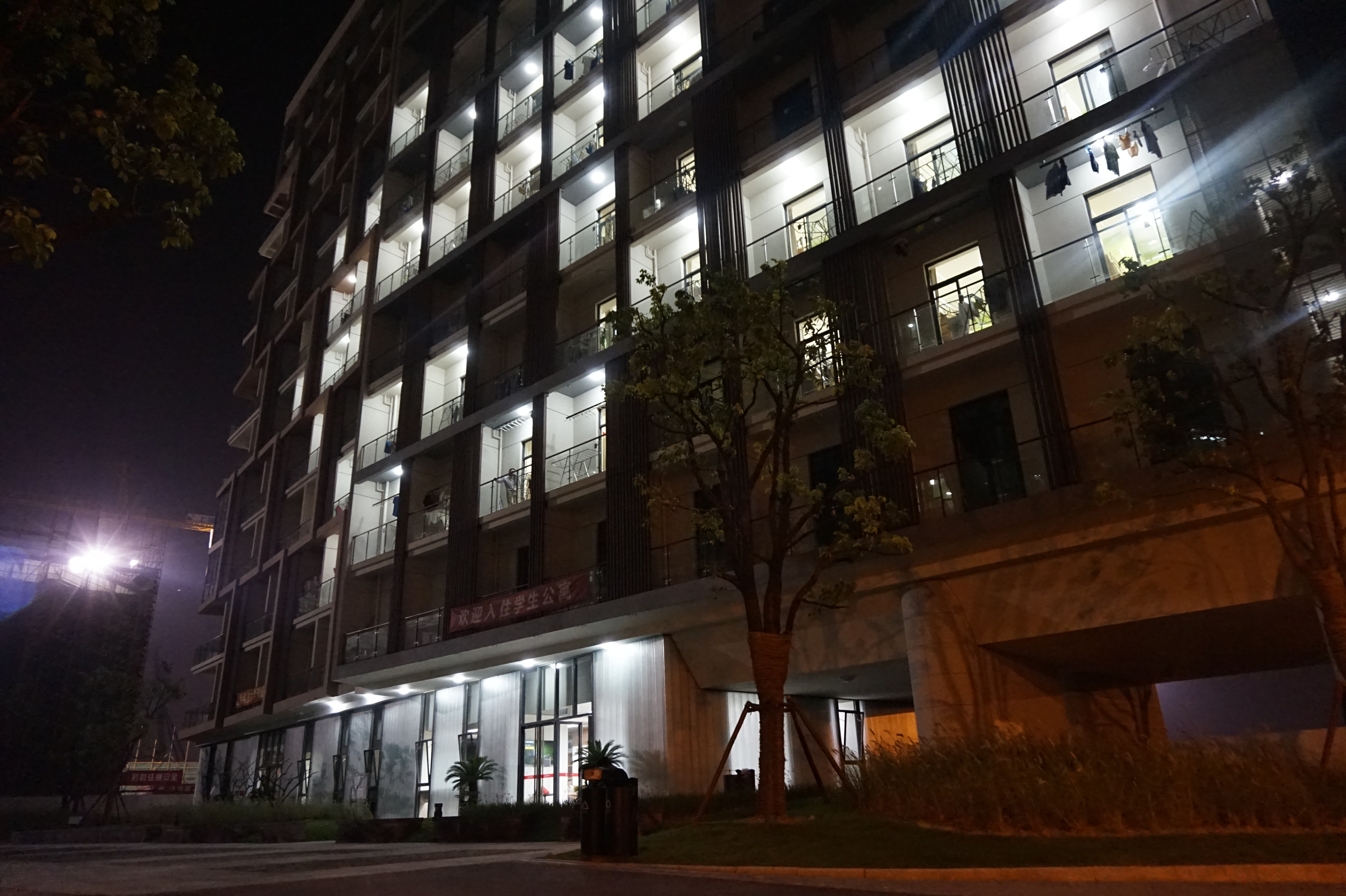
Student dormitories.

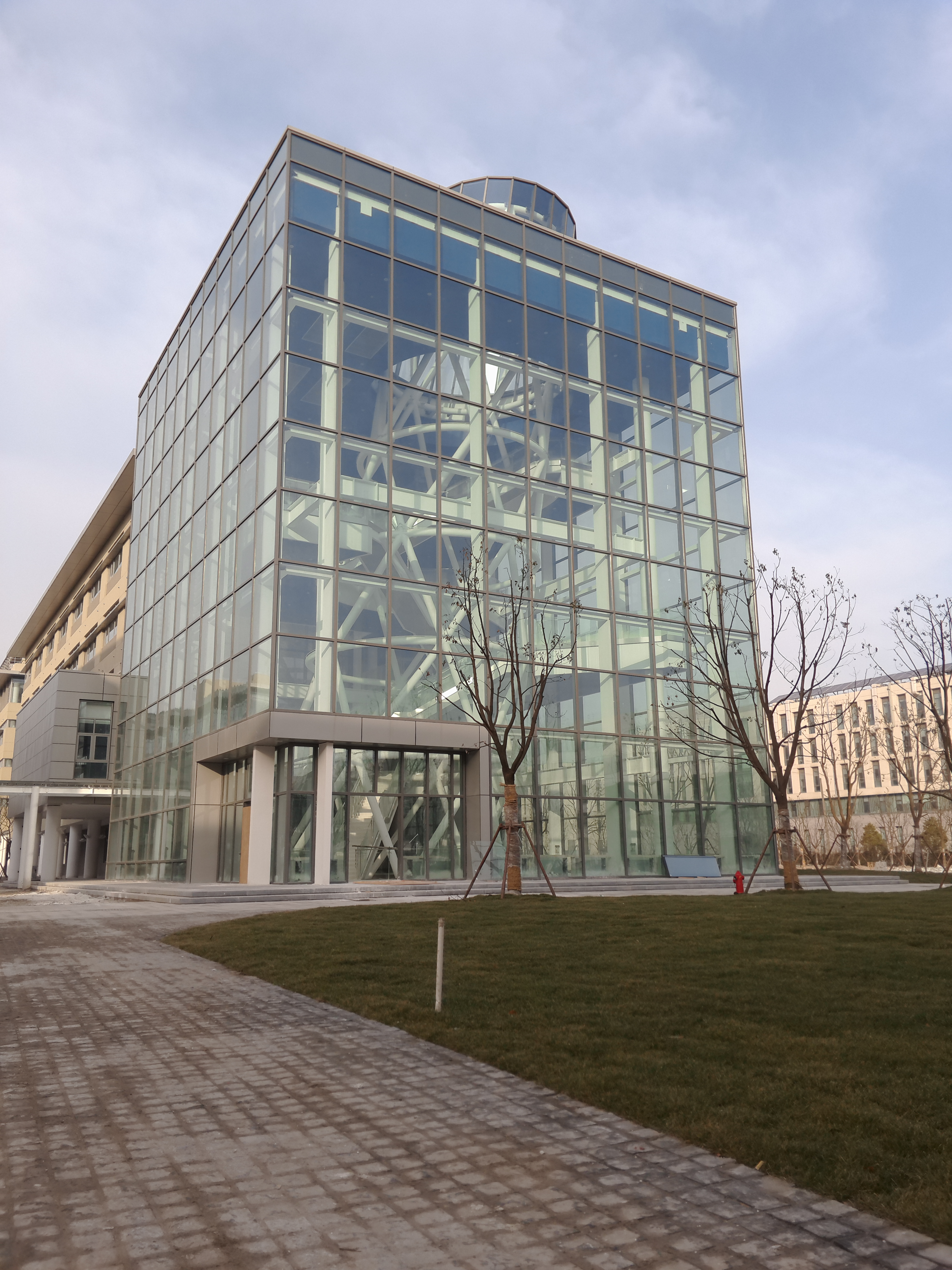
The north tower of the School of Physical Science and Technology.

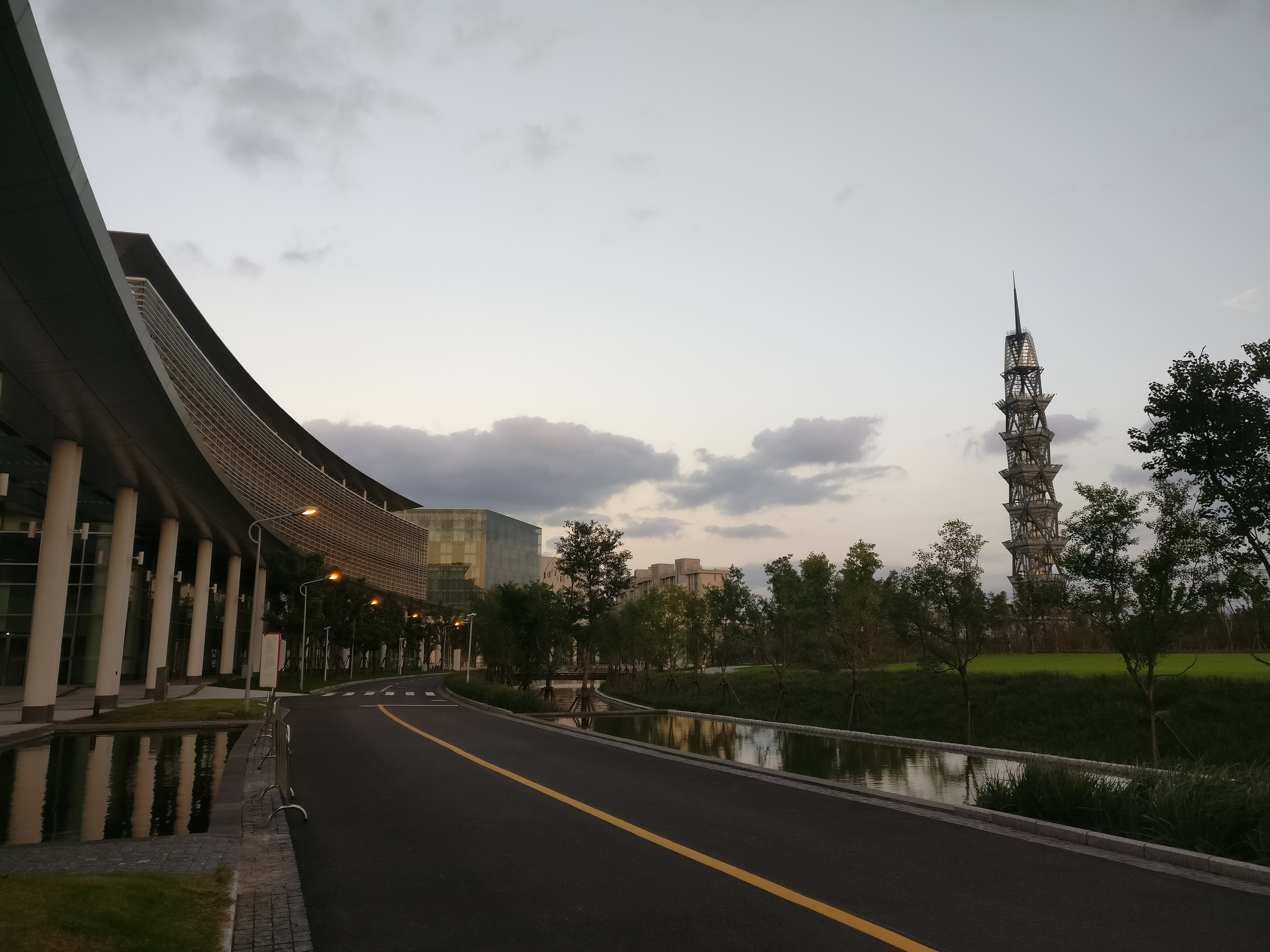
View of the ShanghaiTech tower on the teaching center.

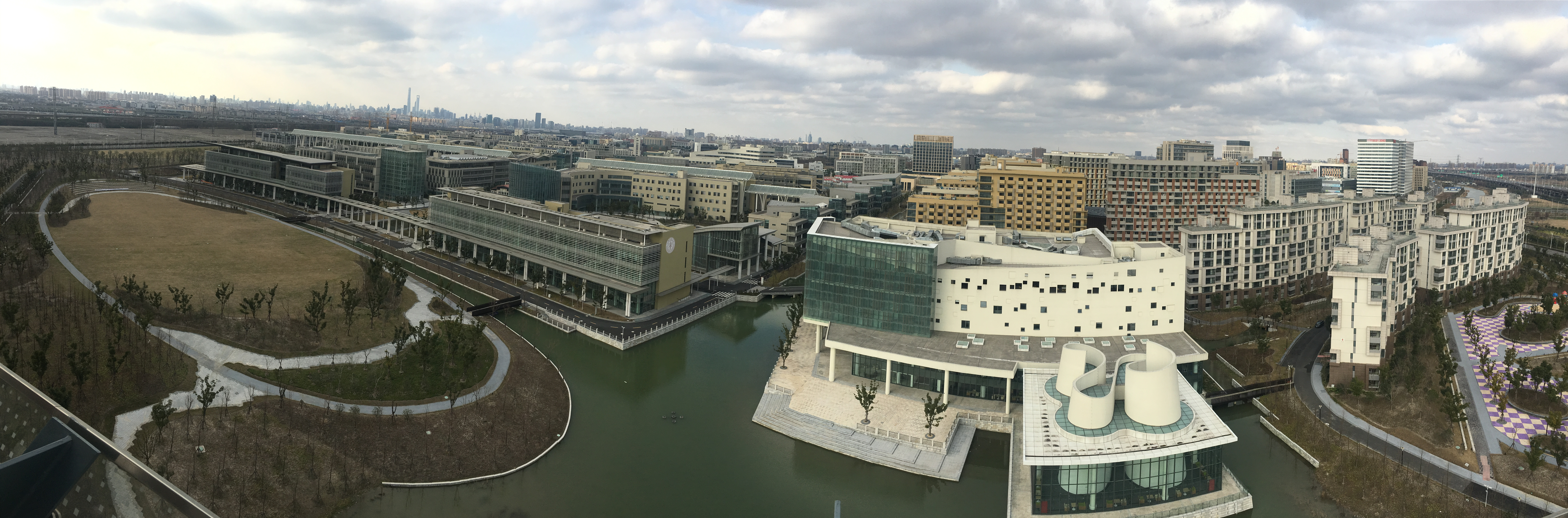
The campus of ShanghaiTech University as seen from its tower. The library can be seen in the center and the teachers apartments on the right. In the front left are the teaching and an administration centers. Behind the first row we can find student dormitories on the right and research buildings on the left. In the skyline on the left the skyscrapers of Lujiazui can be seen. (March 2017)

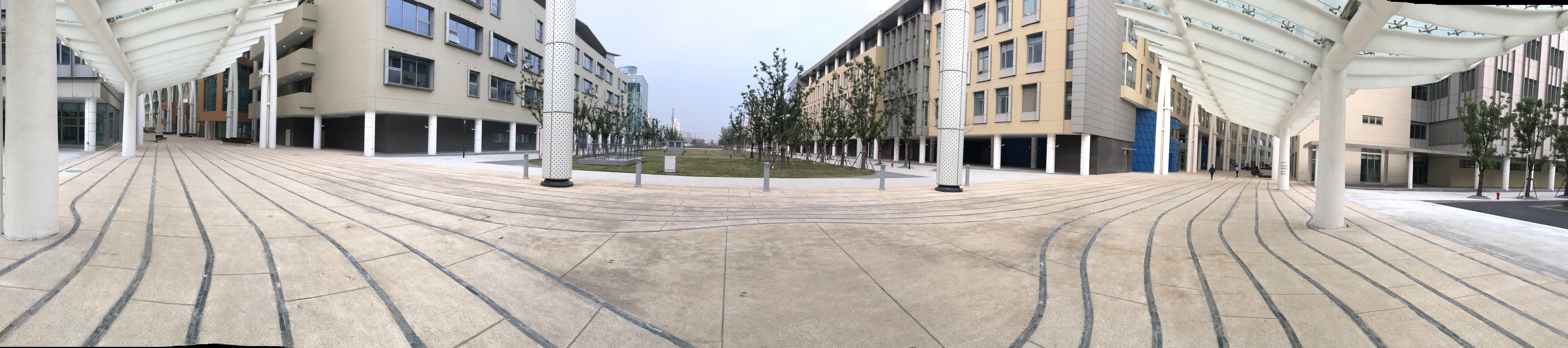
Panoramic view along the main axis of ShanghaiTech University. The School of Physical Science and Technology is on the left and the School of Information Science and Technology on the right. (March 2017)

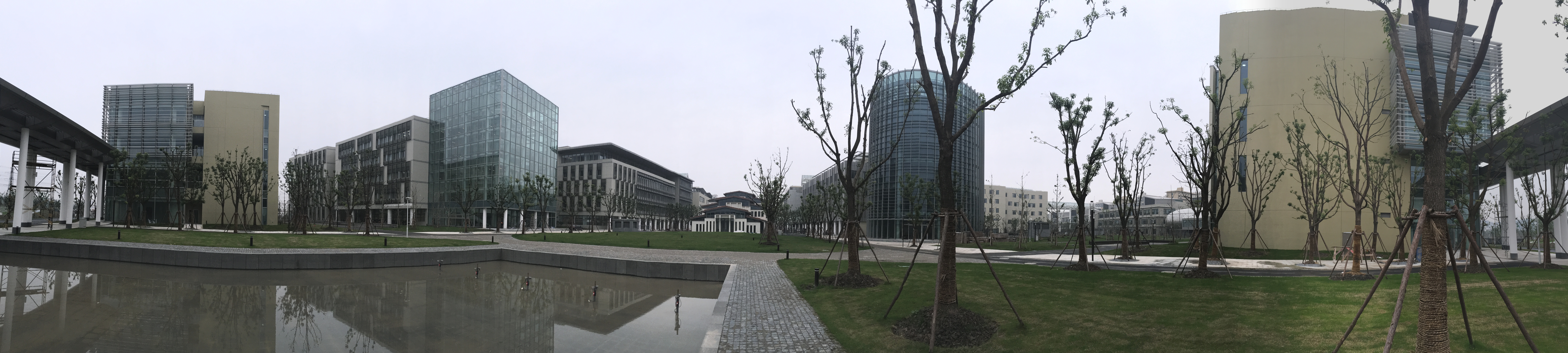
Panoramic image along the main axis of ShanghaiTech University (November 2015).

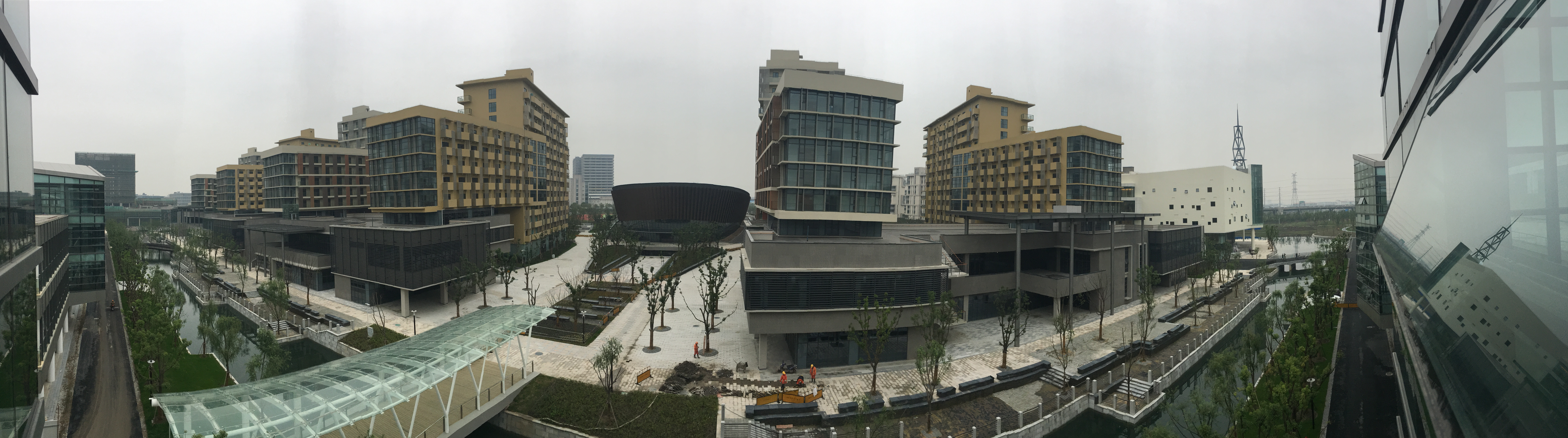
ShanghaiTech Campus. Six dormitories for graduate students, the sports hall (center) and the library (white building to the right) (November 2015).

== See also ==
- The Chinese Academy of Sciences
- University of the Chinese Academy of Sciences
- University of Science and Technology of China
- Shanghai Synchrotron Radiation Facility
