= Xing Kong =

- Country: China
- Broadcast area: Hong Kong; Macau and Worldwide

Programming
- Picture format: 16:9 (HDTV)

Ownership
- Owner: Star China Media

History
- Launched: December 5, 2001; 24 years ago
- Closed: October 1, 2021; 5 years ago (Singapore); May 8, 2026; 4 months ago

Xing Kong was a Mandarin-language television channel targeting mainland China, owned by Star China Media (a subsidiary of China Media Capital).

== Background ==
The channel was originally launched by Star Group Ltd, an Asian subsidiary of News Corporation in Hong Kong, in 2002. In 2010, China Media Capital (CMC) took a controlling stake in Xing Kong, as well as Xing Kong International.

The channel, along with Channel V began broadcasting in high definition on April 11, 2024; although its first HD program did not appear until April 21. Most programs after the launch of its HD feed were still broadcast in 4:3.

Citing operational difficulties, on May 6, 2026, the channel announced that both its feeds and Channel V would cease broadcasting on May 8, 2026, the day announced by its satellite uplinker. The channels shut down at midnight that day.

== Programming ==
It was voted "Satellite Channel of the Year" at the 2002 China Television Programme Awards.

The channel aired more than 700 hours of original programming each year, with content that includes drama series, music, news, cartoon, comedies, variety, lifestyle, health, food, home and living, talk and game shows. Xing Kong was similar to other Mandarin language entertainment channels like Star Chinese Channel in Taiwan (which was named Star) and Phoenix Chinese Channel (21st Century Fox sold its remaining shares in Phoenix Television in 2013).

== Availability ==
Outside Mainland China, the international version of Xing Kong was available in Hong Kong, Macau, Malaysia, Singapore, Indonesia, Vietnam, Thailand, Italy, Middle East (United Arab Emirates, Saudi Arabia, Egypt, Qatar, Yemen, Bahrain and the territories), Canada, United States, Australia and the Philippines. Xing Kong was available as free-to-view on AsiaSat 7 over the Asia-Pacific region (given that the local laws permit the use of privately owned satellite dishes).

Xing Kong alongside its international channel were available free-to-air on AsiaSat 3S (now AsiaSat 7) over the Asia-Pacific region (given that the local laws permit the use of privately owned Satellite dishes). This coverage spanned from Outer Mongolia all the way to Australia and New Zealand. Although the geostationary satellite was located directly above China, private satellite tuning is prohibited in the mainland.

In Indonesia, the channel was available on First Media and in Singapore via IPTV (Singtel TV) but it was closed in 2021.
