= SSRF =

SSRF may refer to:

- SafeSept RF, a transseptal guidewire utilizing radiofrequency to cross from the right atrium to the left atrium of the heart.
- Server-side request forgery, a type of security exploit
- Shanghai Synchrotron Radiation Facility
- Small Scale Raiding Force, a British Commando unit during the Second World War
