= Shu Yang =

Shu Yang or Yang Shu may refer to:

== Surname Shu ==
- Shu Yang (artist) (舒阳, born 1969), Chinese painter, performance artist, photographer, and curator, originally from Xi'an

== Surname Yang ==
- Yang Shu (cinematographer) (杨述, born 1963), Chinese cinematographer based in Beijing
- Shu Yang (materials scientist), Chinese-American professor of materials science and engineering at the University of Pennsylvania
- Shu Yang (statistician), Chinese-American professor of statistics at North Carolina State University

== Other ==
- Shu Yang, pen name of Su Shuyang (苏叔阳, 1938–2019), Chinese playwright, novelist, and screenwriter
