= Ray Stevens (disambiguation) =

Ray Stevens (born 1939) is an American country music and pop singer-songwriter.

Ray or Raymond Stevens may also refer to:

- Ray Stevens (badminton) (born 1951), English badminton player
- Ray Stevens (politician) (born 1953), Australian politician
- Ray Stevens (wrestler) (1935–1996), American professional wrestler
- Ray Stevens, co-developer of the Code 39 barcode specification
- Raymond Stevens (judoka) (born 1963), English judoka
- Raymond C. Stevens (born 1963), American structural biologist
- Raymond B. Stevens (1874–1942), U.S. representative from New Hampshire

== See also ==
- Ray Stephens (baseball) (born 1962), baseball catcher
- Ray Stephens (singer) (1954–1990), lead singer in the disco group Village People
- E. Ray Stevens (1869–1930), Justice of the Wisconsin Supreme Court and Wisconsin State Assemblyman
