= Star China Media =

Chinese media company; subsidiary of China Media Capital

- Logo used since 2001

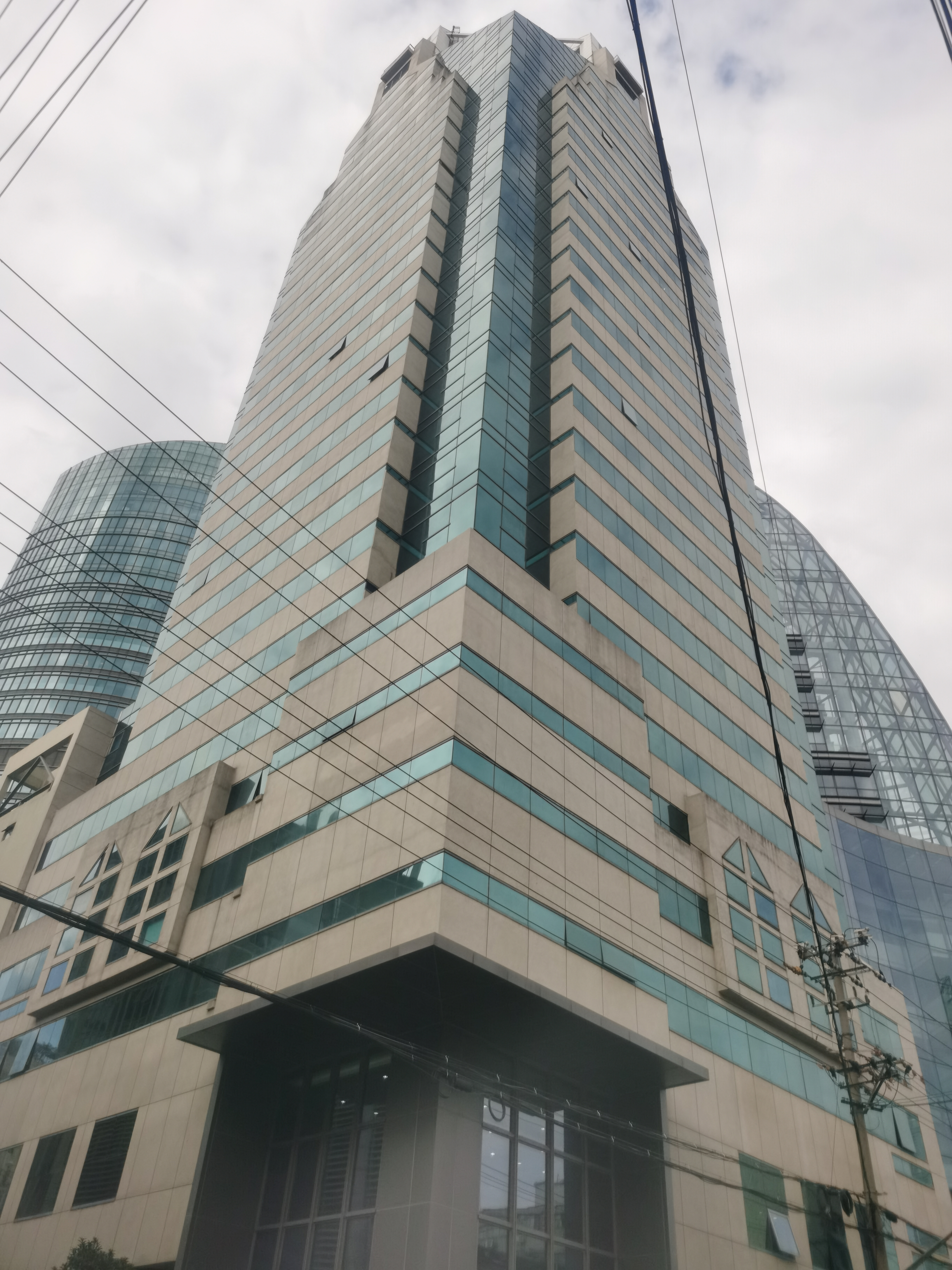
- Headquarters in Shanghai
- Formerly: Star Greater China (4 July 1991–31 May 2010)
- Type: Public
- Traded as: SEHK: 6698
- Industry: Media
- Founded: 4 July 1991; 35 years ago
- Founder: Star TV
- Headquarters: 1211-1212, Jiefang Daily Tower, No.300 Hankou Road, Huangpu District, Shanghai, China
- Key people: Tian Ming (CEO); Cao Zhigao (COO)
- Products: Television broadcasting; Television production; Films
- Parent: China Media Capital
- Subsidiaries: Canxing Media; Fortune Star
- Website: www.fortunestarentertainment.com

Star China Media
- Traditional Chinese: 星空華文
- Simplified Chinese: 星空华文
- Literal meaning: Xing Kong Wen Media
Transcriptions
Standard Mandarin
- Hanyu Pinyin: Xīngkōng huá wén chuán

Star China Media (Chinese: 星空华文), also known as Star (CM) Holdings, is a Chinese media company owned by China Media Capital. The company operates its formerly television channels Xing Kong and Channel V Mainland China, and maintains Fortune Star film library.

Its businesses were previously a part of the original News Corporation's Star TV group of television channels in Hong Kong. China Media Capital took over a percentage of shares in them in 2010, and completed acquisition in 2014.

== History ==
=== Founding ===
Star TV (Satellite Television Asian Region) was founded in British Hong Kong (now called Hong Kong since 1997) in 1991 as a joint venture between Hutchison Whampoa and Li Ka-Shing. It was launched as a Pan-Asian beam-to-air Hollywood English-language entertainment channel for Asian audiences.

=== 1991–2009 ===
In 1991, Star Greater China started with the first 5 channels included Prime Sports, Star Plus, BBC WSTV, MTV and Star Chinese Channel.

In 1992, Rupert Murdoch's News Corporation purchased 63.6% of Star Greater China for $525 million, followed by the purchase of the remaining 36.4% on 1 January 1993. Star broadcasting operations were run from Rupert Murdoch's Fox Broadcasting premises. Murdoch declared that:

"(telecommunications) have proved an unambiguous threat to totalitarian regimes everywhere ... satellite broadcasting makes it possible for information-hungry residents of many closed societies to bypass state-controlled television channels"

In August 2009, the Star Group restructured its Asian broadcast businesses into three units – Star Greater China, Star India, and Fox International Channels Asia where Star Greater China was separated from its Hong Kong headquarters. Among the assets Star Greater China would oversaw included Xing Kong, Channel V Mainland China and Fortune Star film library.

=== Sale to CMC ===
In August 2010, it was announced that News Corporation would sell a controlling stake in its assets in mainland China to China Media Capital (CMC), which was headed by Li Ruigang (of Shanghai Media Group). Xing Kong (both domestic and international versions) and Channel V Mainland China, plus Fortune Star film library were in the sale, and a joint venture named Star China Media was created in the process.

In January 2014, the company's management team and CMC acquired the remaining stake from 21st Century Fox (which took television businesses from the original News Corporation in the 2013 split). This marked 21st Century Fox's exit from Mandarin entertainment television market in Mainland China.

In 2021, Star China Media launched an initial public offering as a publicly traded company, trading on the Hong Kong Stock Exchange (HKSE) with the application being accepted on December 29, 2022, when it was trading on the stock exchange.

== Owned assets ==
=== Television ===
- Xing Kong
- Channel V

=== Film library ===
- Fortune Star

== See also ==
- Sing! China
