= Zhao Zhentang =

Chinese engineer

- Born: May 1961 (age 65); China
- Education: Tsinghua University
- Scientific career
- Fields: Accelerant; Electrolaser
- Workplaces: Shanghai Advanced Research Institute, Chinese Academy of Sciences

Chinese name
- Traditional Chinese: 趙振堂
- Simplified Chinese: 赵振堂
Transcriptions
Standard Mandarin
- Hanyu Pinyin: Zhào Zhèntáng

Zhao Zhentang (Chinese: 赵振堂; born May 1961) is a Chinese engineer and currently vice-president of the Shanghai Advanced Research Institute, Chinese Academy of Sciences. He is a member of the Chinese Nuclear Society (CNS) and the Chinese Physical Society (CPS).

== Biography ==
Zhao was born in May 1961. After the resumption of National College Entrance Examination, he enrolled at Tsinghua University. He carried out postdoctoral research at the Institute of High Energy Physics in 1990. For the next few years he continued his laboratory work at the institute, where he took part in the research of Beijing Electron Positron Collider (BEPC). He was a visiting scholar at the European Organization for Nuclear Research (CERN). In 1998 he moved to Shanghai to participate in the construction of Shanghai light source accelerator. He served as deputy director of the Shanghai Institute of Applied Physics in June 2001, and nine years later promoted to the director position. In December 2018 he joined the Shanghai Advanced Research Institute and was appointed as vice-president. He has been director of the Shanghai Synchrotron Radiation Facility since 2019. He is a researcher at the Shanghai Key Laboratory of Cryogenic & Superconducting RF Technology.

== Honours and awards ==
- 2013 State Science and Technology Progress Award (First Class)
- November 22, 2019 Member of the Chinese Academy of Engineering (CAE)
