= Jeffrey Frankel =

American economist

Jeffrey Alexander "Jeff" Frankel (born November 5, 1952, in San Francisco, California) is an international macroeconomist. He works as the James W. Harpel Professor of Capital Formation and Growth at Harvard Kennedy School.

== Education ==
Frankel graduated from Swarthmore College in 1974 with a B.A. in economics. He then received his Ph.D. from MIT in 1978.

== Career ==
Frankel began his career as an assistant professor at the University of Michigan (1978–1979).

He then worked at UC Berkeley as an assistant professor (1979–1980), an associate professor (1980–1987) and a professor of economics (1987–1999). He also was a visiting professor at Yale in 1980. He eventually joined Harvard in 1999.

Frankel was a member of the Council of Economic Advisers under President Bill Clinton, Frankel's contributions include showing econometrically that openness is good for economic growth, by means of a gravity model of trade (with David Romer).

Frankel directs the Program in International Finance and Macroeconomics at the National Bureau of Economic Research and is also on the Business Cycle Dating Committee, which officially declares US recessions.

== Opinions ==
According to The Market Oracle Frankel says no new monetary policy, after inflation targeting, has been decided on for offering financial stability.

== Publications ==
Frankel has co-authored a number of books and has written for The Guardian.

- Does Foreign Exchange Intervention Work?, with Kathryn Mary Dominguez, Institute for International Economics (1993) ISBN 0-88132-104-4
- Regional Trading Blocs in the World Economic System, with Ernesto Stein and Shang-Jin Wei, Institute for International Economics, (1997) ISBN 0-88132-202-4
- World Trade and Payments: An Introduction, with Richard Caves and Ronald W. Jones, Addison Wesley Longman; (8th edition, 1999) ISBN 0-321-03142-3
- American Economic Policy in the 1990s, with Peter Orszag, The MIT Press (2002) ISBN 0-262-06230-5
- Foreign Exchange, with David R. Henderson, Library of Economics and Liberty (2008) ISBN 978-0865976658
