= Channel V =

Defunct Asian music television channel

- Type: Pay television channel
- Country: China
- Broadcast area: Mainland China, Taiwan, Southeast Asia, Middle East
- Network: Disney Networks Group Asia Pacific (formerly); Star China Media (a subsidiary of China Media Capital)
- Headquarters: Hong Kong

Programming
- Languages: English; Mandarin
- Picture format: 1080i HDTV (downscaled to 480i/576i for the SDTV feed)

Ownership
- Owner: Star China Media
- Sister channels: Xing Kong

History
- Launched: 15 September 1991; 35 years ago (As MTV Asia); 27 May 1994; 32 years ago (As a standalone pay-TV channel); 1 June 1996; 30 years ago (Malaysia on Astro); 4 August 1996; 30 years ago (Thailand); 22 February 1997; 29 years ago (Middle East); 1 September 2013; 13 years ago (Malaysia on HyppTV)
- Closed: 16 June 2010; 16 years ago (Malaysia on Astro); 1 September 2012; 14 years ago (Taiwan); 1 June 2018; 8 years ago (Malaysia on Unifi TV); 1 October 2021; 5 years ago (Southeast Asia, Hong Kong and Middle East); 8 May 2026; 5 months ago (Mainland China)
- Replaced by: FOX Showbiz (Taiwan)
- Former names: MTV Asia; 15 September 1991 – 1 May 1994

Channel [V] ("V" as in the letter, not the Roman numeral "5") was a music television network originally launched by Star TV Hong Kong (now Disney Networks Group Asia Pacific). It was part of the unit of Disney International Operations, and was launched on 27 May 1994 to replace the first incarnation of MTV's Asian operation before it was shut down on 1 October 2021.

The mainland Chinese version was owned by Star China Media, and was the last operational Channel [V]. The Australian channels were owned by Foxtel before their closure.

Channel [V] previously operated either a local feed or a relay of the international version in Hong Kong, Macau, Southeast Asia, the Middle East, and Thailand or localized versions in India, the Philippines, Taiwan, South Korea, Japan and Australia.

== History ==
=== MTV Asia (15 September 1991 – 2 May 1994) ===
Channel [V] was originally launched on 15 September 1991 as MTV Asia (音樂台). It was a 24-hour music channel broadcast in English, Hindi and Mandarin, focused on pop music.

On 2 May 1994, MTV Asia left the STAR TV Network as the contract with Viacom expired.

=== Channel [V] (27 May 1994 – 8 May 2026) ===
==== Launching of Channel [V] ====
On 27 May 1994, under the leadership of managing director Gary Davey, Channel [V] was launched as a replacement of MTV Asia with VJs (who used to work on MTV Asia) celebrating on air from various locations; the Great Wall of China, the Taj Mahal, Downtown Tokyo, the Himalayas etc. At the same time, Channel [V] officially 'split' its beam, in effect, providing two separate services for different regional audiences within the AsiaSat 1's footprint. This enables the channel to provide appropriate programming and viewing time for its viewers from different regions in Asia.

On 5 June 1994, Channel [V] opened its production facilities in Taipei, Taiwan.

On 4 July 1994, Sigaw Manila was launched on the Northern Beam.

On 5 July 1994, Channel [V] has opened up its production facilities in Mumbai (formerly known as Bombay), India.

On 1 August 1994, BPL Oye! was launched on the Southern Beam, hosted by VJ Raageshwari Loomba and Ruby Bhatia.

==== Expansion into other countries ====
On 27 April 1995, the STAR TV Network starts transmitting Channel [V] on the Palapa B2R satellite to Indonesia and the Philippines.

On 30 April 1995, Channel [V] has opened up its production facilities in Dubai, the United Arab Emirates producing Sony Yalla!, the first ever Arabic Top 10 Countdown in the Middle East was launched on the Southern Beam.

On 4 August 1996, a Thai-localized feed of Channel [V] was launched in Thailand, as carried on Thai cable and satellite providers. This apparently replaced Channel [V] International in the country, but the pan-Asian feed would still be available in Thailand via both AsiaSat and Palapa satellites.

In 1997, Channel [V] International was launched in the Middle East on the Middle Eastern digital satellite TV platform Orbit Communications Company as part of the STAR Select package.

On 15 July 1997, Channel [V] International was launched in Japan on the Japanese digital satellite TV platform SKY PerfecTV!.

In 1999, the president of rival MTV Networks Asia conceded that Channel [V] was a very close competitor in Taiwan and Thailand.

==== Closure ====
On 27 April 2021, Disney announced that Channel [V] would be closing down on 1 October as part of its winddown of traditional cable/satellite networks across Southeast Asia and Hong Kong in favor of focusing on both Disney+ and Disney+ Hotstar. Thus the channel space initially created by the first incarnation of MTV Asia in 1991 subsequently ceased to exist on 1 October 2021. As a result, the Star China Media-managed Channel [V] in Mainland China became the only Channel [V] branch operating until its shutdown on 8 May 2026, marking the end of a 34-year existence on Channel [V].

== Feeds ==
=== Mainland China ===
Channel [V] Mainland China is the Chinese branch of the Channel [V] network. It started operating in Mainland China in 1994 as part of Channel [V] Asia. Fox International Channels Asia Pacific sold certain Mandarin language entertainment television channels that target Mainland China, including Channel [V] Mainland China, to China Media Capital. As a result, Channel [V] Mainland China is a part of Star China Media as of 2014 along with Xing Kong. The channel is free-to-air on 3715 H on AsiaSat 7 however in areas with strong 5G reception it can be hard to receive stable reception.

The channel, along with Xing Kong began broadcasting in high definition on 11 April 2024. A new graphics package was also introduced in January 2025.

Citing operational difficulties, on 7 May 2026, sister channel Xing Kong announced that it and both of Xing Kong's feeds will cease broadcasting on 8 May 2026, the day announced by its satellite uplinker. As the last operational Channel [V] branch, its shutdown marked the end of the brand's presence after 31 years.

=== Hong Kong, Macau, Southeast Asia, and International ===
Channel [V] Asia was the flagship of the Channel [V] network. It was founded after MTV Asia separated with the STAR TV Network after the expiration of its contract. It was produced and operated from Hong Kong from January 1994 until January 2002, after which operations and studios were shifted to Malaysia with some aspects still operating in Hong Kong. Since 1 January 2008, Channel [V] International has moved back to its original studio in Hong Kong, which is also the same studio of Channel [V] China and Taiwan.

Channel [V] along with most of the other The Walt Disney Company channels across Southeast Asia and Hong Kong ceased broadcasting on 1 October 2021, with the final music video being "M to the B" by Millie B.

== Channel V around the world ==
Market	Formerly	Launch date	Replacement / Rebrand	Replaced date
Middle East and North Africa	—N/a	22 February 1997	discontinued	1 October 2021
Southeast Asia and Hong Kong	MTV (Southeast Asia (Except Malaysia and Thailand) and Hong Kong)	1 May 1994 (Southeast Asia (Except Malaysia and Thailand) and Hong Kong) 1 June 1995 (Malaysia) 4 August 1996 (Thailand)	discontinued	1 June 2018 (Malaysia) 1 October 2021
Taiwan	—N/a	5 June 1994	FOX Showbiz	1 September 2012
Mainland China	MTV	1 May 1994	discontinued	8 May 2026

=== Former VJs ===
- Rick Tan
- Paula Malai Ali
- Cindy Burbridge
- Marion Caunter
- Angela Chow
- Trey Farley
- Alessandra
- Patrick Lima
- Amanda Griffin
- Danny McGill
- Sophiya Haque
- Cliff Ho
- Maya Karin
- Dania Khatib
- Dom Lau
- Francis Magalona
- Rishma Malik
- Samira
- Joey Mead
- Melanie Casul
- Jonathan Putra
- Lisa S.
- Nicholas Saputra
- Jeremiah Odra
- Asha Gill
- Vivien Tan
- Kamal Sidhu
- Raageshwari Loomba
- Sarah Tan
- Ruth Winona Tao
- Brad Turvey
- Georgina Wilson
- David Wu

- India (1994–2018)

Channel [V] India was the Indian branch of the Channel [V] network. It was operated by Star India. It started operating in India in 1994 as part of Channel [V] Asia. On 1 July 2012, the channel discontinued its musical programming and started focusing on original content through fiction dailies and studio formats that address teenage issues. On 30 June 2016, stopped airing original programming. On 1 August, it rebranded its graphical package. Later, it discontinued operations on 15 September 2018.

- Philippines (1994–2012)

Channel [V] Philippines was the Filipino branch of the Channel [V] network. It was a joint venture between Fox Networks Group Asia Pacific, Fox International Channels, Previous channel providers and partners like Ermita Electronics Corporation (Channel 23 where MTV Asia also air on the same channel as a first launch), CityNet (Channel 27, A GMA Network affiliate), TV Xtreme Broadcasting Company and Northern Star Productions. It started operating in the Philippines in 1994 as part of Channel [V] Asia. It discontinued operations on 13 July 2012.

- Australia (1995–2020)

Channel [V] Australia was the Australian branch of the Channel [V] network. It was first launched as Red in 1995 and was owned by Foxtel. It ceased broadcasting in Australia on 26 February 2016, as it merged with [V] Hits (later rebranded as [V]), focusing only on music video programming and countdowns. V Hits was also formerly known as Club [V] and Channel [V] 2, and ceased broadcasting on 1 July 2020. Former VJs included Osher Günsberg (then "Andy G"), Jabba, James Mathison, Chloe Maxwell and Yumi Stynes.

- Taiwan (1994–2018)

Channel [V] Taiwan was the Taiwanese branch of the Channel [V] network. It started operating in Taiwan in 1994 as part of Channel [V] Asia. On 1 September 2012 it was replaced by Fox Taiwan (and later Star World Taiwan).

- South Korea (1994–2008)

Channel [V] Korea was the Korean branch of the Channel [V] network. It started operating in South Korea in 1994 as part of Channel [V] Asia.

- Japan (1994–2002)

Channel [V] Japan was the Japanese branch of the Channel [V] network. It started operating in Japan in 1994 as part of Channel [V] Asia. The channel was acquired by Space Shower in 2002, and was renamed to Video Music Channel in that year, thus ending Channel [V]'s presence in Japan.

- Thailand (1994–2016)

Channel [V] Thailand was the Thai branch of the Channel [V] network. It is a joint venture between The Walt Disney Company Asia Pacific, GMM Media and TrueVisions. It started operating in Thailand in 1994 as part of Channel [V] Asia.

Channel [V] Thailand also officially ceased transmission in 2016.

== See also ==
- MTV Asia
- MYX
