= Raymond C. Stevens =

American chemist and structural biologist

- Born: 1963 (age 62–63)
- Education: University of Southern Maine, University of Southern California
- Awards: Beckman Young Investigators Award,
- Scientific career
- Fields: Structural biology
- Workplaces: ShanghaiTech University, University of Southern California

Raymond C. Stevens (born 1963) is an American chemist and structural biologist, Founder, CEO and Board Member of Structure Therapeutics; Founding Director of the iHuman Institute at ShanghaiTech University; Professor Emeritus of Chemistry, and Founding Director of the Bridge Institute at the University of Southern California; Board Member, Danaher Corporation.

== Biography ==
Stevens was born into a military family. In 1969 his father died in the Air Force, and his mother took several part-time jobs to support the family. He was raised in Auburn, Maine.

In 1980, Stevens joined the Army under their split option training program and conducted basic training at Fort Dix, New Jersey and advanced individual training at Fort Sam Houston, Texas. While engaged in his military service, Stevens entered the University of Southern Maine in the Computer Science program in 1981. However, an enthusiastic professor (John Ricci) converted him to the study of Chemistry. He spent two summers working as an intern at the Brookhaven National Laboratory in Long Island with Professor Ricci, and Drs. Thomas Koetzle and Dick McMullan, where he first learned how to determine the molecular structure of compounds by X-ray and neutron diffraction. While there he also met a University of Southern California research team led by Dr. Robert Bau; after he obtained a Bachelor of Science degree in chemistry at USM, he entered the University of Southern California in pursuit of a Doctor of Philosophy degree in Chemistry working with Professor Robert Bau and Nobel Laureate Professor, George Olah. He completed his Ph.D. in 26 months, graduating in 1988.

Although science is a major part of his life, Stevens climbs mountains with his wife and children and runs ultramarathons including the Vermont 100 Mile Endurance Run and American River 50 Mile Endurance Run, and in 2011 he successfully completed the 156 mile Marathon des Sables across the Moroccan Sahara Desert. Currently working on climbing the 7 highest mountains on the 7 continents, he has climbed Mt. Kilimanjaro, Mt. Elbrus, Aconcagua, Vinson Massif and Mt. Kosciuszko. Next mountains are Mt. Everest and Denali.

== Scientific career ==
After obtaining his Ph.D., Stevens accepted a postdoctoral position in 1988 in the lab of Nobel Laureate William N. Lipscomb, Jr. in the chemistry department at Harvard University where he focused on the large allosteric enzyme aspartate carbamoyltransferase. In 1991, he accepted a tenure-track position at the University of California, Berkeley in the chemistry department with a joint appointment in neurobiology. His initial research as an assistant professor focused on structural neurobiology and immunology, combining chemistry, structural biology and protein chemistry with a specific biological interest in understanding how the G protein-coupled receptor (GPCR) superfamily works. A seminal collaboration for Stevens was with Professor Peter G. Schultz where they jointly published a series of Science and Nature papers describing the immunological evolution of antibodies through careful structural studies. In 1999, Stevens left Berkeley to take a tenured position at The Scripps Research Institute. While at The Scripps Research Institute, Stevens has helped to found and establish the Joint Center for Structural Genomics, Joint Center for Innovative Membrane Protein Technologies, and the GPCR Network, all funded by the National Institutes of Health with direct guidance from NIGMS. In 2012, Stevens co-founded the iHuman Institute at ShanghaiTech University. In 2014, Stevens moved his lab from The Scripps Research Institute to the University of Southern California, where he is currently the Provost Professor of Biological Sciences and Chemistry and he founded the Bridge Institute to converge the arts and sciences.

Stevens is known for obtaining the structures of many biologically significant proteins and his technological innovations. He is considered a pioneer of high-throughput x-ray crystallography and structural genomics. His laboratory has led to the contribution of over 500 protein structure entries in the Protein Data Bank www.pdb.org. Stevens has withdrawn two different structures of ligand-bound clostridial neurotoxins.

In October 2007, Stevens and colleagues published the first high-resolution structure of a human GPCR. The β_{2}-adrenergic receptor work was quickly followed up 9 months later by the determination of the structure of the human A_{2A} adenosine receptor structure, also known as the caffeine receptor. In 2010, the structures of the human chemokine CXCR4 receptor (HIV co-receptor), the human dopamine D3 receptor and the human Histamine H1 receptor were published. In addition to these inactive-state structures, Stevens and colleagues solved the structure of an agonist-bound A_{2A} adenosine receptor.

Subsequent novel human receptor structures include:

2012: The first structure of a lipid-activated GPCR, the sphingolipid, the human kappa-opioid receptor and the human nociceptin/orphanin FQ peptide receptor.

2013: Serotonin receptors 5-HT1B and 5-HT2B, the second HIV co-receptor, C-C chemokine receptor type 5 (CCR5) and the first structure of a non-class A GPCR, the transmembrane domain of the human Metabotropic glutamate receptor 1 (mGluR1) and the first structures of non-rhodopsin family GPCRs, the transmembrane domain of the human Smoothened receptor from the Frizzled/Taste2 family and the transmembrane domain of the human glucagon receptor (GCGR) from the adhesion (class B) family.

2014: The human P2Y receptor 12 (P2Y12) bound to antagonist or agonist; the human Delta opioid receptor at 1.8A and the first structure of a class C GPCR, the transmembrane domain of the human Metabotropic glutamate receptor 1 (mGluR1).

2015: The human Lysophosphatidic acid receptor 1 (LPAR1), the human angiotensin II receptor type 1 (AT1R), human P2Y receptor 1 (P2Y1); and the human Rhodopsin-Arrestin complex.

2016: The marijuana receptor—human Cannabinoid receptor type 1 (CB1) and the human C-C chemokine receptor type 2 (CCR2)

2017:The human apelin receptor and the human angiotensin II receptor 2 (AT2R) as well as the full length human glucagon receptor (GPCR) and trans membrane domain of the human glucagon like peptide receptor 1 (GLP1R)

2018: The human seratonin receptor 5HT2C human neuropeptide Y Y1 receptor platelet activating factor receptor and the trans membrane domain of the human frizzled 4 receptor

2019: The human prostaglandin E2 receptor3 (EP3), the human cannabinoid receptor CB2, the human neurokinin 1 receptor, and the melatonin receptors MT1 and MT2

2020:The human melanocortin 4 receptor (MC4),

In combination with the structural studies, working with the computational biology community to conduct GPCR Dock 2008 and GPCR Dock 2010 has helped to evaluate where the field is at, and functional studies using HDX and NMR are conducted by Stevens and collaborators to understand how the receptors work at the molecular level, and what fundamental and basic insights can be gained towards developing therapeutic drugs.

== Structure based drug discovery ==
In 1992, Stevens worked with researchers at Gilead on the structural studies of neuraminidase inhibitors that eventually became Tamiflu, and later partnered with Roche. After the initial experience with structure based drug discovery from 1992 to 1997 with Gilead and Tamiflu, Stevens focused on understanding the basic mechanism of how Botox (botulinum toxin) works, and on ways to use this scaffold for next generation protein therapeutics. In parallel to the work on botulinum toxin, he worked on the enzymes involved in the catecholamine biosynthetic pathway, specifically the three aromatic amino acid hydroxylases including phenylalanine hydroxylase. From 1999 to 2004, Stevens was involved in the startup of Syrrx that developed the marketed drug Nesina for type II diabetes. From 2000 to 2010, Stevens has worked with BioMarin Pharmaceutical to develop Kuvan (tetrahydrobiopterin) and assisted in the design and development of PEG-PAL (pegylated Phenylalanine ammonia-lyase) as treatments for mild and classical phenylketonuria (PKU). In 2008, Stevens started Receptos that developed an S1P1 agonist for multiple sclerosis and inflammatory bowel disease, now on the market called Zeposia and sold by BMS.

== Biotechnology Startups ==
Stevens has started four biotechnology companies (Syrrx (1999), MemRx (2002), Receptos (2009), and RuiYi (2011)), all focused on structure based drug discovery and each company started with one of his former Ph.D. students.

- Syrrx, started with UC-Berkeley Ph.D. student Nathaniel David and colleague Peter G. Schultz, was acquired by Takeda Pharmaceuticals in 2005 for the high-throughput structure based drug discovery platform, and because of a phase II clinical candidate alogliptin known to inhibit the enzyme DPPIV and is now an approved drug known as Nesina.
- MemRx, started with Ph.D. student Mike Hanson and Jun Yoon, was acquired by Sagres Discovery in 2003 for the membrane protein expression technologies, and the combined entity was later acquired by Novartis in 2005.
- Receptos, started with Ph.D. students Mike Hanson, Chris Roth and staff scientist Mark Griffith along with TSRI colleagues Hugh Rosen and Ed Roberts, focused on GPCR structure based drug discovery with a primary interest in inflammation and oncology. On July 14, 2015, Celgene announced that it will buy Receptos for $7.32 billion in cash. The S1P1 agonist was approved for patients with MS in March, 2020 under the brand name Zeposia and sold by BMS.
- In 2011, Stevens, with Paul Grayson and his former TSRI graduate student Fei Xu, started RuiYi, a biologics GPCR company located in Shanghai, China. The company was acquired by Anaphore in 2012. The company currently has one drug in phase II clinical trials for RA and a drug in place for liver fibrosis.
- In 2018, Stevens, with former students Mike Hanson and Jun Yoon, started Structure Therapeutics, a company focused on converting biologics to small molecules using next generation structure-based drug discovery to make best in class medicines accessible to all. The company currently has two drugs in clinical trials for pulmonary and metabolic diseases.

== Awards ==
- Named to the PharmaVoice 100 (2022)
- Elected American Association for the Advancement of Science (AAAS) Fellow (2020)
- International Scientific Cooperation Award of the Chinese Academy of Sciences (2020)
- USC Undergraduate Mentor Award (2019)
- Awarded Magnolia Gold Award of Shanghai (2019)
- Biophysical Society 2019 Anatrace Membrane Award
- National PKU Alliance Award (2018)
- The Protein Society, Stein and Moore Award (2018)
- Outstanding Faculty Award Shanghai Tech University (2017)
- Awarded Magnolia Silver Award of Shanghai (2017)
- International Scientific Collaboration Award of Shanghai (2016)
- Member, Norwegian Academy of Science and Letters (2016)
- Thomson Reuters Highly Cited Researcher, 2014 (biology & biochemistry); 2015 (biology & biochemistry; pharmacology & toxicology) and 2016 (biology & biochemistry; pharmacology & toxicology)
- Qian Ren Award, Chinese Academy of Sciences (Shanghai, China) (2002)
- Beckman Young Investigators Award (1994)
- National Science Foundation's Presidential Young Investigator Award (1994)
- Sidhu Award (1992)

== Philanthropy ==
=== The John S. Ricci Lecture Hall ===
Stevens honored his University of Southern Maine professor and mentor, John Ricci, by facilitating the renovation of the lecture hall inside the University science building and renaming it The John S. Ricci Lecture Hall.

=== The Professor Emeritus John Ricci Undergraduate Fellowships ===
Established by Stevens to honor USM Professor Emeritus John Ricci and his innovative educational program at Brookhaven National Laboratory, these summer fellowships offer a unique opportunity for USM undergraduates to pursue research at The University of Southern California in Los Angeles, California, one of the oldest private research universities. In 2018, Stevens and his wife supported the building of the John S. Ricci Lecture Hall in honor of his undergraduate teacher and mentor.

=== The Robert Bau Endowed Graduate Fellowship ===
Established by Stevens and Charles McKenna in 2010 to honor USC distinguished professor Robert Bau after his death in December 2008, the fellowship proposes to help celebrate Professor Bau's life and honor his extraordinary mentorship by linking him to new generations of young chemists at USC.
