= Yingyao Hu =

American economist (born 1972)

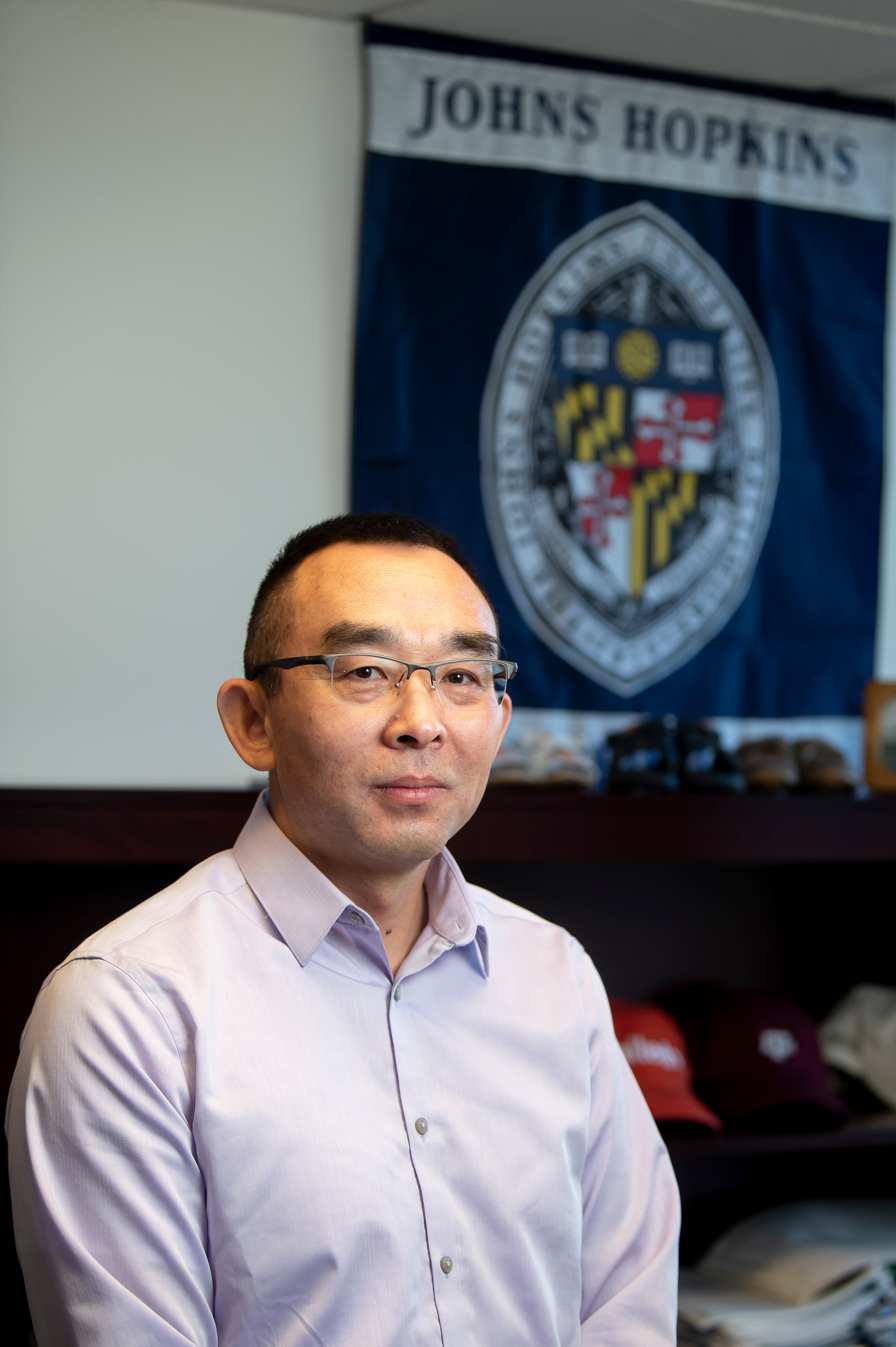
- Yingyao Hu in 2021
- Born: 1972 (age 53–54); Xinjiang, China
- Spouse: Wei Wang

Academic background
- Education: Johns Hopkins University; Fudan University; Tsinghua University

Academic work
- Discipline: Econometrics; Empirical industrial organization Labor economics
- Institutions: Johns Hopkins University

Yingyao Hu 胡颖尧 (born 1972) is a Chinese American economist and the Krieger-Eisenhower Professor of Economics in the Krieger School of Arts & Sciences, Johns Hopkins University.

== Early life and education ==
Hu was born in Xinjiang Uygur Autonomous Region (XUAR). His parents were among the 97,000 Shanghai zhiqing (知青), or zhishi qingnian (知识青年), “the educated youths,” mobilized by the Chinese state to migrate to the Xinjiang Production and Construction Corps (新疆生产建设兵团) from 1963 to 1966. Hu went to the elementary, middle, and high school in Xinjiang. He was admitted to the School of Economics and Management at Tsinghua University as the 14th highest scored student of Xinjiang in 1989. He graduated from Tsinghua University with a B.E. in 1994 and from Fudan University with a M.A. in 1997. He studied in the Department of Economics at Michigan State University for one year in 1998, and then transferred to the Johns Hopkins University, where he obtained his Ph.D. in economics (2003) and M.S.E. in mathematical sciences (2001). His Ph.D. advisor is Geert Ridder.

== Career ==
Hu was an assistant professor in the Department of Economics at the University of Texas at Austin between 2003 and 2007. He joined the Department of Economics at the Johns Hopkins University as an assistant professor in 2007, got promoted to be an associate professor in 2011, and a full professor in 2015. Starting in 2019, Hu has served as the chair of the Department of Economics at Johns Hopkins University.

Hu is a research fellow at IZA (2008–present), a Fellow of the Journal of Econometrics (2013 – present), and a Fellow of the Global Labor Organization (2020–present).

== Research contributions ==
Hu has contributed to the literature in micro-econometrics, empirical industrial organization, labor economics, and macroeconomics.

=== Micro-econometrics ===
Hu studied identification and estimation of microeconomic models with mis-measured variables or unobserved heterogeneity, or more generally, "latent variables." He proposed an innovative approach to show that models with latent variables can be nonparametrically identified and estimated given that the latent variable has two measurements and a binary indicator that is correlated with it. This approach, now known in the literature as the "eigen-decomposition method", is applicable regardless the latent variable is discrete or continuous. Specifically, if the latent variable is discrete, the identification involves eigenvalue-eigenvector decomposition of a matrix constructed by the data; if the latent variable is continuous, it involves eigenfunction decomposition of a linear operator again constructed by the data. The method has been widely used in both structural economic models (e.g., auctions, games, dynamic models) and reduced form models.

In addition to measurement error models, Hu has also worked on other important topics in econometrics such as completeness of a function and panel data models with fixed effects or unobserved covariates. His work on latent variables is summarized in the manuscript "The Econometrics of Unobservables – Latent Variable and Measurement Error Models and Their Applications in Empirical Industrial Organization and Labor Economics".

=== Empirical industrial organization ===
Hu considered structural models with unobserved heterogeneity/variables. He contributed to the literature of auctions by providing identification of auction models with auction-level unobserved heterogeneity. Moreover, he contributed to the literature of dynamic discrete choice models by allowing the presence of time-varying unobserved state variable, or that the agent has subjective beliefs. Furthermore, he studied agent's belief updating in learning models via lab experiments.

=== Labor economics ===
Hu addressed the issue of misreporting in the Current Population Survey (CPS) and found that the official U.S. unemployment rate substantially underestimated the true level of unemployment. During the period from January 1996 to August 2011, the corrected monthly unemployment rates are between 1 and 4.4 percentage points (2.1 percentage points on average) higher than the official rates, and are more sensitive to changes in business cycles. In another paper, Hu studied the impact of hurricanes on the regional fertility rate in the U.S.; this paper won the 2013 Kuznets Prize for the best published article in the Journal of Population Economics during the period 2010 to 2012. More recently, Hu published a paper uncovering a more reliable estimate of China's unemployment rate.

=== Macroeconomics ===
Hu expanded his interests into the macroeconomic space in recent years. He applied his econometric methods of latent variables to studying the GDP growth using a novel approach that relates nighttime lights with economic activities. This research has attracted much attention in media (BBC, IMF blog, IMF F&D magazine, Le Monde, The Economist, Financial Times, Bloomberg News, and The Wall Street Journal.)

He has also been actively sharing his thoughts about China's economic growth via blog posts.

== Professional service ==
Hu has served as an associate editor of several leading economics journals, including Econometrics Journal, Econometrics Reviews, Frontiers of Economics in China, and Journal of Econometrics, and as a panelist of the National Science Foundation economics program. He is a member of editorial board of Journal of Systems Science and Systems Engineering. He was a co-editor (with Tom Wansbeek) of an Annals of Econometrics issue on measurement error models (a special issue of Journal of Econometrics), and a guest co-editor of China Economic Review (Virtual Special Issue: 2020 CES Conferences). Hu was a co-chair of program Committee for the 2019 China Meeting of the Econometric Society, a member of Scientific Committee of the International Symposium on Econometric Theory and Applications (SETA) from 2014 to 2017, a program committee member for the 2017 China Meeting of the Econometric Society, and a member of Board of Directors for the Chinese Economists Society.

Hu was one of amici curiae in support of Students For Fair Admissions (SFFA) in the SFFA v. Harvard case, in which SFFA alleged that Harvard's undergraduate admission practices discriminated against Asian Americans, in the United States District Court for the District of Massachusetts, in the United States Court of Appeals for the First Circuit, and in the Supreme Court of the United States during 2018-2023.

== Selected publications ==
- Hu, Yingyao; Yao, Jiaxiong (June 2022). "Illuminating economic growth". Journal of Econometrics. 228 (2): 359–378. doi:10.1016/j.jeconom.2021.05.007.
- Hu, Yingyao (October 2017). "The econometrics of unobservables: Applications of measurement error models in empirical industrial organization and labor economics". Journal of Econometrics. 200 (2): 154–168. doi:10.1016/j.jeconom.2017.06.002.
- Feng, Shuaizhang; Hu, Yingyao; Moffitt, Robert (May 2017). "Long run trends in unemployment and labor force participation in urban China". Journal of Comparative Economics. 45 (2): 304–324. doi:10.1016/j.jce.2017.02.004.
- Hu, Yingyao; McAdams, David; Shum, Matthew (June 2013). "Identification of first-price auctions with non-separable unobserved heterogeneity". Journal of Econometrics. 174 (2): 186–193. doi:10.1016/j.jeconom.2013.02.005.
- Feng, Shuaizhang; Hu, Yingyao (April 2013). "Misclassification Errors and the Underestimation of the US Unemployment Rate". American Economic Review. 103 (2): 1054–1070. doi:10.1257/aer.103.2.1054. hdl:10419/101366.
- Schennach, S. M.; Hu, Yingyao (March 2013). "Nonparametric Identification and Semiparametric Estimation of Classical Measurement Error Models Without Side Information". Journal of the American Statistical Association. 108 (501): 177–186. doi:10.1080/01621459.2012.751872.
- Hu, Yingyao; Shum, Matthew (November 2012). "Nonparametric identification of dynamic models with unobserved state variables". Journal of Econometrics. 171 (1): 32–44. doi:10.1016/j.jeconom.2012.05.023. hdl:10419/49893.
- An, Yonghong; Hu, Yingyao; Shum, Matthew (August 2010). "Estimating first-price auctions with an unknown number of bidders: A misclassification approach". Journal of Econometrics. 157 (2): 328–341. doi:10.1016/j.jeconom.2010.02.002.
- Carroll, Raymond J.; Chen, Xiaohong; Hu, Yingyao (May 2010). "Identification and estimation of nonlinear models using two samples with nonclassical measurement errors". Journal of Nonparametric Statistics. 22 (4): 379–399. doi:10.1080/10485250902874688. PMC 2873792. PMID 20495685.
- Evans, Richard W.; Hu, Yingyao; Zhao, Zhong (January 2010). "The fertility effect of catastrophe: U.S. hurricane births". Journal of Population Economics. 23 (1): 1–36. doi:10.1007/s00148-008-0219-2. hdl:10419/34380.
- Hu, Yingyao; Schennach, Susanne M. (January 2008). "Instrumental Variable Treatment of Nonclassical Measurement Error Models". Econometrica. 76 (1): 195–216. doi:10.1111/j.0012-9682.2008.00823.x.
- Hu, Yingyao (May 2008). "Identification and estimation of nonlinear models with misclassification error using instrumental variables: A general solution". Journal of Econometrics. 144 (1): 27–61. doi:10.1016/j.jeconom.2007.12.001.

== Awards and honors ==
- Journal of Nonparametric Statistics Best Paper Award (2010)
- The Kuznets Prize for the best published article in the Journal of Population Economics (2013)
- Fellow of the Journal of Econometrics (2013-)
- The Denis J. Aigner Award for best empirical paper published in the Journal of Econometrics

in 2022-23.
