= Swee-Huat Lee =

- Born: Singapore

Academic background
- Education: Stanford University (M.S.)

Academic work
- Discipline: Leadership; Talent management Performance Management; Organizational Development; Change Management; Leadership & Management Philosophies

Swee-Huat Lee (Chinese: 李瑞華; born 1954) was senior executive in several international corporations before switching to his teaching career. Since 2002 he started teaching at several top universities in Taiwan and China. He was a full-time professor at Taiwan's National Chengchi University (NCCU) from 2008 to 2022. He is currently retired but continues teaching as adjunct professor at NCCU, and distinguished professor at Shanghai's Fudan University.

== Biography ==
Swee-Huat Lee was born and raised in Singapore. He holds a master’s degree in management from Stanford University Graduate School of Business. He worked as an expatriate in Beijing and Hong Kong from 1989 to 1997, and relocated to work and live in Taiwan since 1998. He is currently retired but continues his teaching at National Chengchi University in Taiwan (Since 2004) and Fudan University in Shanghai (Since 2009). He has taught in EMBA programs at Tsinghua University in Beijing (2004-2022), Xiamen University (2009-2014), and National Tsing Hua University in Taiwan (2002-2013). His teachings focus on leadership development, talent management, performance management, organizational development, and change management. He is a column writer and member of the editorial board for the Harvard Business Review (Taiwan edition) since 2007.

== Career ==
=== Early career ===
Prior to his teaching career, Swee-Huat Lee was senior executive at several international companies, including: Regional VP and COO for Asia Pacific at Lucent Technologies (1994-1997), General Manager for Greater China at Polaroid Corporation (1991-1994), General Manager for China at GE Medical Systems (1989-1991), Regional Manager for South East Asia at Du Pont Corporation (1991-1988).

Joining TSMC

In 1998, Lee joined Taiwan Semiconductor Manufacturing Company (TSMC) as Vice President and Head of Human Resources (1998-2003) and led major transformations of the HR function and people management processes.

=== Academic career ===
In 2002, Lee began teaching in the EMBA program at National Tsing Hua University.

In 2004 Lee retired from his corporate career to focus on teaching.

In 2007, he started teaching an English-taught course titled "Confucianism and Leadership," where he introduces to international students ancient wisdoms of Confucianism and explores its practical applications in modern leadership challenges. Since 2017, this evolved into a Chinese taught course titled "Chinese Classic Philosophies and Leadership" at NCCU and Fudan University EMBA programs, where he links ancient wisdoms of Confucianism, Buddhism, Taoism, and Legalism to modern leadership and management practices.

== Philanthropy and higher education contributions ==
Lee has dedicated his philanthropic efforts to promoting pedagogical innovation, holistic education, and the preservation of teaching mentorship. In 2016, together with then-National Chengchi University (NCCU) president Edward Chou, Lee initiated the "Zhongni Distinguished Teaching Award" with a personal donation of NT$10 million, conferring NT$1 million annually on an NCCU professor recognized as a role model of teaching excellence. In 2024, he donated NT$100 million to establish the "NCCU Zhongni Foundation," followed by a further NT$50 million in 2025. In June 2026, Lee advanced the fund toward a sustainable endowment model by donating 100,000 shares of TSMC stock from his personal holdings.

His contribution was matched by two NCCU alumnae: Lora Ho, former senior vice president of TSMC, with 100,000 shares of TSMC stock, and Maggi Chen, chairman of Chenbro Micom, with 100,000 shares of Chenbro stock. The combined donation of 300,000 blue-chip shares was the largest stock donation in NCCU's history, bringing the total value of the NCCU Zhongni Foundation to NT$750 million, with Lee's cumulative personal contributions reaching NT$390 million (based on share market value on 16 June 2026). The foundation operates under a sustainable endowment framework in which only dividends are used while the shares are retained for long-term capital appreciation, enabling long-term support for teaching innovation, faculty development, and holistic education.

As a Singaporean, Lee extended his educational philanthropy to his birthplace through a 2025 donation of approximately SG$1.2 million (around US$1 million), made jointly with his wife, to Singapore Management University (SMU). Inspired by the Confucian teachings of "education for all" (有教無類) and "teaching in accordance with aptitude" (因材施教), the donation adopts a dual-support model. It funds the perpetual "Zhongni Distinguished Educator Award," the university's highest accolade for teaching excellence, which confers SG$50,000 (around US$40,000) annually on a professor recognized as a role model of teaching excellence. Concurrently, an allocation of SG$192,000 (around US$150,000) funds the "Zhongni Scholarship," supporting four high-potential SMU students, each with a four-year scholarship granting SG$12,000 (around US$10,000) annually. The scholarship targets students of high potential facing financial constraints, advancing the Confucian values of social equity and ren, yi, li, zhi (humanity, integrity, respect, and wisdom).
