= Lysophosphatidic acid receptor =

The lysophosphatidic acid receptors (LPARs) are a group of G protein-coupled receptors for lysophosphatidic acid (LPA) that include:

- Lysophosphatidic acid receptor 1 (LPAR1; formerly known as EDG2, GPR26)
- Lysophosphatidic acid receptor 2 (LPAR2; formerly known as EDG4)
- Lysophosphatidic acid receptor 3 (LPAR3; formerly known as EDG7)
- Lysophosphatidic acid receptor 4 (LPAR4; formerly known as GPR23, P2RY9)
- Lysophosphatidic acid receptor 5 (LPAR5; formerly known as GPR92)
- Lysophosphatidic acid receptor 6 (LPAR6; formerly known as GPR87, P2RY5)

== See also ==
- Lysophospholipid receptor
- Sphingosine-1-phosphate receptor
- P2Y receptor
