= Feng Donglai =

Feng Donglai is a professor of University of Science and Technology of China, who works on condensed matter physics. Feng Donglai was elected as a member of the Chinese Academy of Sciences in 2021. He became the President of ShanghaiTech University in June, 2024.

== Honors ==
- 2005, Javed Husain Prize
- 2010, AAA, Robert T. Poe Prize

== Selected papers ==
- Evidence for ubiquitous strong electron–phonon coupling in high-temperature superconductors
- Photoemission Evidence for a Remnant Fermi Surface and a d-Wave-Like Dispersion in Insulating Ca2CuO2Cl2
- Signature of Superfluid Density in the Single-Particle Excitation Spectrum of Bi2Sr2CaCu2O8+δ
- Temperature-induced momentum-dependent spectral weight transfer in Bi2Sr2CaCu2O8+δ
