= Chunyang Hu =

- 胡春阳
- Born: April 15, 1970 (age 56)
- Education: Sichuan University, Fudan University
- Known for: Research on interpersonal communication and discourse analysis
- Scientific career
- Fields: Communication studies
- Workplaces: Fudan University

Chunyang Hu (Chinese: 胡春阳; born 15 April 1970) is a Chinese communication scholar and a professor at Fudan University. Her research focuses on interpersonal communication, discourse analysis, mobile communication, international communication, health communication, and cultural studies.

Hu has been the subject of media coverage, including a profile in Chinese Social Sciences Today, which discusses her research on interpersonal communication.

Hu has contributed to the Chinese translation of major works in international communication, including International Communication: Continuity and Change, which has been discussed in Chinese media.

She has authored and edited numerous books and textbooks on communication studies, interpersonal communication, and discourse analysis. She has also developed and taught courses in interpersonal communication on national online education platforms. She has also translated academic works into Chinese, including the Sage Handbook of Interpersonal Communication.

Hu has also been a visiting scholar and research fellow at several international institutions, including the Berkman Klein Center for Internet & Society at Harvard University and the Brian Lamb School of Communication at Purdue University. Hu has also been recognized for her contributions to academic peer review in China.

Chunyang Hu received her bachelor's degree (1990) from Sichuan University and her master's degree (2000) and PhD (2005) from Fudan University. After receiving her PhD, she was employed at Fudan University and worked with the School of Journalism and the Information and Communication Study Center of Fudan University. In December 2015, Chunyang Hu was promoted to full professorship of Communication Studies. Hu has served as a reviewer for academic journals and publishing houses, including Routledge. She has also participated in national research and thesis evaluation programs in China, including thesis quality monitoring organized by the Ministry of Education and social science research assessment projects.

Hu was a research fellow at the Berkman Klein Center for Internet & Society at Harvard University in 2013–2014. She was also a visiting scholar at the Brian Lamb School of Communication at Purdue University in 2013. She served as exchange faculty at Chu Hai College of Higher Education in Hong Kong in 2011 and visited California State University, Fullerton as a scholar. From January 2023 to January 2024, she was a visiting professor at Queen's University in Canada, where she conducted a research project in cultural studies.

== Selected publications ==
=== Monographs ===
- Hu, Chunyang (2007). Discourse Analysis: A New Approach to Communication Studies. Shanghai: People's Publishing House. 293 pp.
- Hu, Chunyang (2012). The Quiet Noise and Perpetual Contact – Mobile Communication and Interpersonal Interaction. Shanghai: SDX Joint Publishing Company. 227 pp.

=== Translations ===
- Hu, Chunyang; Huang, Hongyu; Yao, Jianhua (2013). The Political Economy of Communication. Chinese translation of the work by Vincent Mosco. Shanghai: Shanghai Translation Publishing House.
- Hu, Chunyang; Huang, Hongyu (2015). The SAGE Handbook of Interpersonal Communication. Chinese translation of the edited volume by Mark L. Knapp. Shanghai: Fudan University Press.
- Hu, Chunyang (2022). International Communication: Continuity and Change. Chinese translation of the work by Daya Kishan Thussu. Shanghai: Fudan University Press.
- Hu, Chunyang et al. (2024). The Routledge Handbook of Family Communication. Chinese translation edition. Shanghai: Fudan University Press.
- Hu, Chunyang; Yin, Xiaorong (2024). The Routledge Handbook of Health Communication. Chinese translation edition. Shanghai: Fudan University Press.

=== Textbooks ===
- Hu, Chunyang (2016). Theory and Practice: Interpersonal Communication. Beijing: Beijing Normal University Press.

=== Selected journal articles ===
- Hu, Chunyang (2012). "The discourse myth in news on Chinese finance: Taking news on real estate as cases." Fudan Journal of the Humanities and Social Sciences, (3).
- Hu, Chunyang (2011). "Mobile politics: Activism, political power and communication networks." Fudan Journal of the Humanities and Social Sciences, (1), pp. 152–157.
- Hu, Chunyang (2009). "Network: Freedom and imagination about freedom: A study of network in the perspective of Bakhtin's carnival theory." Fudan Journal.
- Hu, Chunyang (2018). "Computer-mediated communication: A double-edged sword." Chinese Social Sciences Today, 15 November 2018.
- Hu, Chunyang (2019). "Invisible parents and idealized affection: A study on parent–child communication and relationship maintenance of rural left-behind children." Journalism Bimonthly, (9).
