= Wu Songgao =

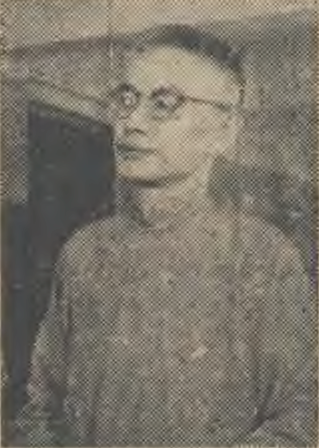
Wu Songgao

Wu Songgao (simplified Chinese: 吴颂皋; traditional Chinese: 吳頌皋; pinyin: Wú Sònggāo; Wade–Giles: Wu Sung-kao, 1898–1953) was a politician, jurist and political scientist in the Republic of China. He was an important politician during the Wang Jingwei regime. He was born in Wuxian (now, Wuzhong District and Xiangcheng District, Suzhou), Jiangsu.

== Biography ==
After graduating the Fudan University, Wu Songgao went to France and entered to the Division of Law, University of Paris. After graduating it, he went to United Kingdom, and became a research worker in the University of London. Later he returned to China, and successively held the positions of President of the Post Graduate Course of Law of the Fudan University, Associate Professor of the Post Graduate Course of Law of the National Central University, and Professor of the Department of Politics of the National Central Political School.

In July 1932, Wu Songgao was appointed to the Councilor of the Executive Yuan of the National Government. Next November, he was transferred to the Councilor of the Ministry of Foreign Affairs. In July 1935, he was appointed to the Chief of the International Affairs Bureau, the Ministry of Foreign Affairs, and the secretary of the Foreign Affairs Group of the Central Political Commission. On that time, he worked as the Chief Editor of the Foreign Affairs Review Magazine and the Manager of the Political Science Society of China.

Later Wu Songgao participated to the Wang Jingwei regime, and was appointed to the Central Executive Member of the Kuomintang (Wang's clique) and the secretary of the Central Political Committee. In July 1942, he was appointed to the Chief Member of the Advisory Committee for Foreign Affairs and the Vice-Minister for Judicial Administrating. Next Year, he successively held the positions of Member of the committee for requisitioning Japanese settlement in Hankou, Member of the committee for requisitioning French settlement and Member of the committee for requisitioning French settlement in Tianjin.

In April 1944, Wu Songgao was appointed to the Chief-Secretary of the Government of the Shanghai Special City. Next month, he also held the chairman of the committee for Baojia system in Shanghai. In January 1945, he promoted to the Ministry for Judicial Administrating, and also held the vice-chairman of the committee for abolition of extraterritorial right.

After the Wang Jingwei regime had collapsed, on August 17, the Leader of the Team of the Taxation Police Bureau (稅警局隊長) Zhou Gao (周鎬) who was a subordinate of Zhou Fohai suddenly started captured important members of the Wang Jingwei regime. On that time, Wu Songgao also arrested by Zhou Gao's group. Later the Vice-Chief of the General Staff of the China Expeditionary Army Takeo Imai (今井武夫) urged Zhou Gao to release arrested people, so Wu also was set a free.

But on September 8 same year, Wu Songgao was arrested by the Chiang Kai-shek's National Government. Later because of the charge of treason and surrender to enemy (namely Hanjian), Wu was sentenced to life imprisonment. After the People's Republic of China had established, his treatment wasn't changed.

Wu Songgao died in prison in 1953.

== Alma mater ==
Fudan University
University of Paris

== Footnotes ==
- Xu Youchun (徐友春) (main ed.) (2007). Unabridged Biographical Dictionary of the Republic, Revised and Enlarged Version (民国人物大辞典 增订版). Hebei People's Press (Hebei Renmin Chubanshe; 河北人民出版社). ISBN 978-7-202-03014-1.
- Liu Jie (劉傑) (2000). The Trial for Hanjians (漢奸裁判). Chuokoron-Shinsha. ISBN 978-4-12-101544-0.
- History of Prison in Shanghai (上海监狱志) The Office of Shanghai's History (上海地方志办公室) Website
- Liu Shoulin (刘寿林) (etc.ed.) (1995). The Chronological Table of the Republic's Officer (民国职官年表). Zhonghua Book Company (Zhonghua Shuju; 中华书局). ISBN 7-101-01320-1.
