= Gu Yidong =

Chinese chemist

Gu Yidong (Chinese: 顾翼东; also known as Yih-Tong Ku, 1903–1996) was a Chinese chemist, considered a founder of inorganic chemistry in China. He was an academician and founding member of the Chinese Academy of Sciences. Gu received his Ph.D. in organic chemistry from University of Chicago in 1935.
