= Wang Defeng =

- 王德峰
- Born: October 1956 (age 69–70); Tai County, Jiangsu, China
- Occupation: Professor

Academic background
- Education: Fudan University

Academic work
- Discipline: Philosophy
- Sub-discipline: Marxist philosophy Western philosophy Chinese philosophy
- Institutions: Fudan University

Wang Defeng (Chinese: 王德峰; pinyin: Wáng Défēng; born October 1956) is a Chinese philosophical researcher who was a professor at Fudan University.

== Biography ==
Wang was born in Tai County (now Jiangyan District), Jiangsu, in October 1956. During the Cultural Revolution, he was a worker in Shanghai Dongfeng Alloy Factory between 1975 and 1978. After resuming the college entrance examination, in 1978, he enrolled at Fudan University, where he majored in philosophy.

After university in 1982, he became an editor in Shanghai Translation Publishing House. Starting from September 1987, he pursued a master's degree in philosophy at the Department of Philosophy, Fudan University. After graduation, he stayed for teaching. He was promoted to associate professor in 2005 and retired in October 2021.

== Publications ==
=== Translations ===
- Karl Jaspers (2003). Man in the Modern Age (in Chinese). Shanghai: Shanghai Translation Publishing House. ISBN 978-753-273-638-6. (时代的精神状况)
- Peter-André Alt (2003). The Aesthetic Process of Evil: a Romantic Interpretation (in Chinese). Beijing: Central Compilation & Translation Press. ISBN 978-751-171-883-9. (恶的美学历程：一种浪漫的解读)
- Aaron Redley (2007). Music Philosophy (in Chinese). Shanghai: Shanghai People's Press. ISBN 978-720-806-863-6. (音乐哲学)

=== Works ===
- 哲学导论 [Introduction to the Philosophy] (in Chinese). Shanghai: Shanghai People's Press. 2000. ISBN 978-720-803-448-8.
- 马克思的哲学革命及其当代意义 [Marx's Philosophical Revolution and Its Contemporary Significance] (in Chinese). Beijing: People's Press. 2005. ISBN 978-701-004-706-5.
- 艺术哲学 [Philosophy of Art] (in Chinese). Shanghai: Fudan University Press. 2005. ISBN 978-730-904-655-7.
- 寻觅意义：王德峰人文讲座·随笔 [Searching for Meaning: Wang Defeng's Humanities Lecture and Essay] (in Chinese). Shanghai: Shanghai Jinxiu Article Publishing House. 2007. ISBN 978-780-685-818-9.
