= Shang-Jin Wei =

Shang-Jin Wei is the N. T. Wang Professor of Chinese Business and Economy and Professor of Finance and Economics at Columbia Business School. At Columbia University, Wei is also affiliated with the School of International and Public Affairs and the Weatherhead East Asian Institute. His research covers international finance, trade, macroeconomics, and China, and he writes and speaks frequently in the area of U.S.-China economic integration and other international finance and trade issues.

== Education ==
Wei received his bachelor's degree from Fudan University and master's from the Pennsylvania State University in 1986 and 1988 respectively. He received an M.S. in business administration (finance) and his Ph.D. in economics from University of California, Berkeley in 1991 and 1992, respectively.

== Career as an economist ==
Wei was an associate professor of public policy at Harvard University, the New Century Chair in Trade and International Economics at the Brookings Institution. He was the International Monetary Fund's Chief of Mission to Myanmar in 2004, and later the assistant director of the Research Department and chief of the Trade and Investment Division, and adviser at the World Bank.

In 2007 Wei joined the faculty of Columbia Business School, where he is the director of the Jerome A. Chazen Institute of International Business and the director of the Working Group on the Chinese Economy. He is also Research Associate at the National Bureau of Economic Research and Research Fellow at the Center for Economic Policy Research in Europe.

Wei has been a consultant to the U.S. Board of Governors of the Federal Reserve System, United Nations Economic Commission on Europe, United Nations Development Program, the Asian Development Bank, and private companies such as PricewaterhouseCoopers.

In 2014, Wei became Chief Economist of the Asian Development Bank.

== Publications ==
He has published in the Journal of Political Economy, Quarterly Journal of Economics, The Economic Journal, American Economic Review, The Journal of Finance, Journal of Financial Economics, Review of Financial Studies, Review of Economics and Statistics, Journal of International Economics, European Economic Review, Canadian Journal of Economics, and Journal of Development Economics. He is the author, co-author, or co-editor of China's Evolving Role in the World Trade, with R. Feenstra (University of Chicago Press, 2010); The Globalization of the Chinese Economy, with J. Wen and H. Zhou (Edward Elgar, 2002); Economic Globalization: Finance, Trade and Policy Reforms (Beijing University Press, 2000); and Regional Trading Blocs in the World Economic System, with J. A. Frankel and E. Stein (Peterson Institute for International Economics, 1997). He has been quoted in The New York Times, Los Angeles Times and Wall Street Journal.

== Selected publications ==
- Wei, Shang-Jin, and Robert Feenstra (2010). China's Growing Role in World Trade. Chicago: University of Chicago Press.
- Wei, Shang-Jin, Guanzhong James Wen, and Huizhong Zhou, eds. (2002). The Globalization of the Chinese Economy. Cheltenham: Edward Elgar Publishing.
