= Shu Yang (materials scientist) =

Chinese-American materials scientist

- Education: Cornell University; Fudan University
- Scientific career
- Workplaces: University of Pennsylvania; Lucent Technologies
- Thesis: Molecular design, synthesis and characterization of novel polymers for microelectronics (1999)
- Website: Shu Yang Group

Shu Yang is a Chinese-American materials scientist who is the Joseph Bordogna Professor of Engineering and Applied Science and Chair of the Department of Materials Science and Engineering at the University of Pennsylvania. She is a Fellow of the Royal Society of Chemistry, American Physical Society, National Academy of Inventors and Materials Research Society.

== Early life and education ==
Yang was born in China. She attended Fudan University in Shanghai. She moved to the United States for graduate studies, where she joined Cornell University as a student in chemistry and chemical biology. She remained at Cornell for her doctoral research, where she worked on the design and synthesis of novel polymers for microelectronics. After graduating, she joined Bell Labs as a member of the Lucent Technologies.

== Research and career ==
In 2004, Yang joined the faculty at the University of Pennsylvania. She was promoted to Professor in 2013 and elected Chair in 2021. Yang is interested in the synthesis and fabrication of novel materials, including self-assembled nanostructures and responsive materials. Through the study of lotus leaves and butterflies, Yang created novel superhydrophic surfaces. These surfaces have very high nanoscale roughness, which reduces the contact area between water and results in water being repelled from the surface. Superhydrophic surfaces could be used to keep the outside of buildings and solar panels dry and clean. To fabricate these surfaces, Yang pioneered the use of holographic lithography, using a laser to cross-link a photoresist. Areas of the photoresist that are not illuminated by the laser are removed by a solvent, leaving a 3D network behind. She optimized the structure of the network using a combination of good and bad solvents. Through the study of photosymbiotic giant clams, Yang worked with Alison Sweeney on the development of solar concentrators. By introduce molecular ordering in two-dimensional sheets of a rubber-like material called liquid crystal elastomer, the Yang lab transforms the sheets into complex three-dimensional geometries, such as a human face, with heat. She is investigating self-morphing building blocks for novel manufacturing processes. These building blocks are based on biological systems and natural materials. For example, by studying snail slime she created a novel, reversible adhesive. By introducing holes and cuts in 2D sheets, Yang demonstrates dramatic color and shape change and super-conformability via collapsing or expanding of the hole arrays in the micro- and macroscales. By programming the geometry of cuts and fold using origami and kirigami mechanisms, Yang explores potential applications in water harvesting, super-stretchable and shape conformable medical devices.

During the COVID-19 pandemic, Yang was part of a team who created an origami-inspired face mask that could be used to address the shortage of personal protective equipment in hospitals. She shared the design through Open Medical and recommended the respirators be made using sterilisation wrap. The mask achieved a 95% viral filtration efficiency.

== Awards and honors ==
- 2006 National Science Foundation Career Award
- 2011 American Chemical Society Arthur K. Doolittle Award
- 2014 Elected Fellow of the National Academy of Inventors
- 2015 George H. Heilmeier Faculty Award for Excellence in Research
- 2017 Elected Fellow of the Royal Society of Chemistry
- 2018 Elected Fellow of the American Physical Society
- 2018 Elected Fellow of the American Chemical Society
- 2019 Fellow of Drexel University’s Executive Leadership in Academic Technology, Engineering and Science Program
- 2021 Elected Fellow of the Materials Research Society

== Selected publications ==
- Tom N Krupenkin; J Ashley Taylor; Schneider, Tobias; Shu Yang (2004). "From rolling ball to complete wetting: the dynamic tuning of liquids on nanostructured surfaces". Langmuir. 20 (10): 3824–3827. doi:10.1021/la036093q. PMID 15969363. Wikidata Q81875141.
- Yu Xia; Tyler S Mathis; Meng-Qiang Zhao; et al. (2018). "Thickness-independent capacitance of vertically aligned liquid-crystalline MXenes". Nature. 557 (7705): 409–412. doi:10.1038/s41586-018-0109-z. PMID 29769673. Wikidata Q59069656.
- S. Qin; Y. Geng; D. E. Discher; S. Yang (2006). "Temperature-Controlled Assembly and Release from Polymer Vesicles of Poly(ethylene oxide)-block- poly(N-isopropylacrylamide)". Advanced Materials. 18 (21): 2905–2909. doi:10.1002/adma.200601019. Wikidata Q57341520.
