= China Media Capital =

Private equity firm

CMC Holdings
- Trade name: China Media Capital
- Type: Private
- Industry: Private Equity
- Founded: 2009; 17 years ago
- Founder: Li Ruigang
- Headquarters: Shanghai, China
- Key people: Li Ruigang (Chairman)
- Owner: Li Ruigang
- Website: www.cmccap.com

China Media Capital (Chinese: 华人文化) is a private equity firm specializing in growth capital, mid venture, late venture, emerging growth, corporate restructuring, management buyouts, and mergers & acquisitions. The firm prefers to invest in the cultural, technology, media, entertainment, consumer, medical treatment, and telecommunication sectors. It invests both inside and outside China.

China Media Capital was founded in 2009 and is based in Shanghai, China, with an additional office in Beijing. CMC has shares in the City Football Group and Formula E team Techeetah.

== History ==
In August 2010, Star China Media was announced that News Corporation would sell a controlling stake in its assets in mainland China to China Media Capital (CMC), which was headed by Li Ruigang (of Shanghai Media Group). Xing Kong (both domestic and international versions) and Channel V Mainland China, plus Fortune Star film library were in the sale, and a joint venture named Star China Media was created in the process.

In January 2014, the company's management team and CMC acquired the remaining stake from 21st Century Fox (which took television businesses from the original News Corporation in the 2013 split). This marked 21st Century Fox's exit from Mandarin entertainment television market in Mainland China.

In 2021, Star China Media launched an initial public offering as a publicly traded company, trading on the Hong Kong Stock Exchange (HKSE) with the application being accepted on December 29, 2022, when it was trading on the stock exchange.

== Filmography (abridged) ==
- The Wandering Earth (2019)
- Pegasus (2019)
- The Beachbuds (2021)
- Lost in the Stars (2023)
- Meg 2: The Trench (2023)

== Investment holdings ==
- Techeetah
- Pearl Studio (formerly Oriental DreamWorks)
- Star China Media
- Skydance Corporation
- Flagship Entertainment Group (41%)
- City Football Group (13%)
- TVB Limited
- Shaw Brothers Studio (11%)
- Sanrio (10%)
- THOIP (90%)
- Daewon Media (92%)
- Showbox (25.00%)
- Alpha Group Co., Ltd. (99%)
- Gravity Pictures

=== Shareholders ===
- Alibaba
- Tencent
- China Vanke

== See also ==
- China Film Group Corporation
- Flagship Entertainment Group (41%)
- Pearl Studio
- Star China Media
- China Movie Channel
- Alpha Group Co., Ltd. (99%)
- Shaw Brothers/TVB
