= Li Ruigang =

Chinese businessman

- 黎瑞刚

Honorary chair of the Shanghai Oriental Pearl Media

Vice chair of the TVB
- Incumbent
- Assumed office 17 October 2016

Chairman of the Shaw Brothers Holdings Limited
- Incumbent
- Assumed office 25 October 2016
- Preceded by: Allan Yap

Personal details
- Born: 13 June 1969 (age 56) Lanzhou, Gansu

Chinese name
- Simplified Chinese: 黎瑞刚
- Traditional Chinese: 黎瑞剛
Transcriptions
Standard Mandarin
- Hanyu Pinyin: Lí Ruìgāng

Li Ruigang (Chinese: 黎瑞刚; born 13 June 1969) is a Chinese businessman and media mogul. He was born in Lanzhou, Gansu province with his ancestral home in Zhongshan, Guangdong.

== Early life and education ==
Li obtained an MBA from Fudan University and went to Columbia University as a visiting scholar.

== Career ==
Li was president of the Shanghai Media Group from 2002 to 2011.

In 2011, Li was appointed as Deputy Secretary-General of the Shanghai Party Committee and Director of the Municipal Party General Office.

Li is chair of China Media Capital which bought a stake in Manchester City football club. He oversaw a mass media holding company that includes television stations, radio, newspapers, magazines, and Internet ventures. During his tenure revenue for the company expanded six-fold.

Li serves as a non-executive director of WPP.
