= Shanghai Synchrotron Radiation Facility =

Coordinates: 31.190603°N 121.583269°E

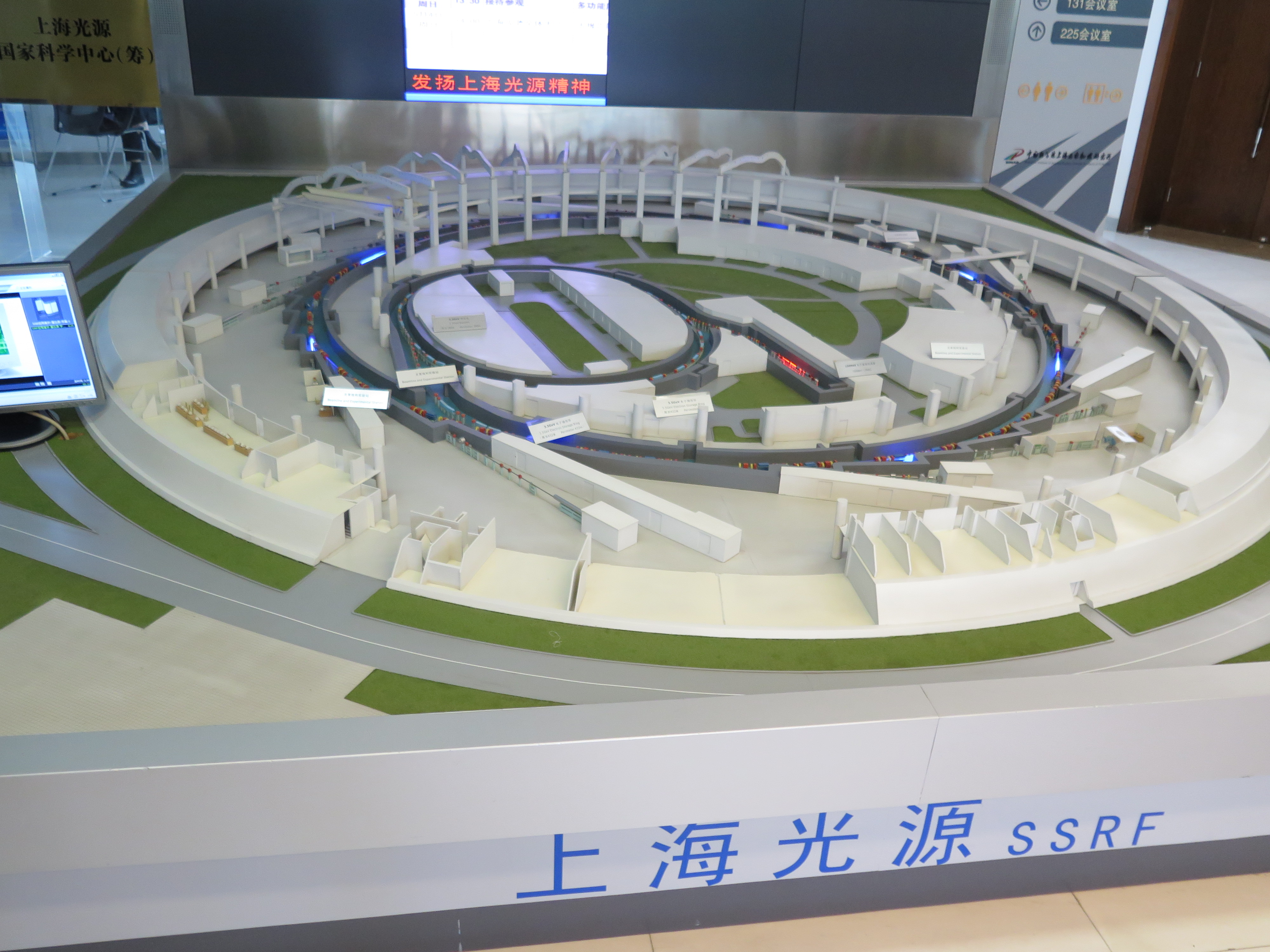

The Shanghai Synchrotron Radiation Facility (SSRF) (Chinese: 上海同步辐射光源) is a synchrotron-radiation light source facility in Shanghai, People's Republic of China. Located in an eighteen-hectare campus at Shanghai National Synchrotron Radiation Centre, on the Zhangjiang Hi-Tech Park in the Pudong district.

SSRF is operated by the Shanghai Institute of Applied Physics (SINAP). The facility became operational in 2009, reaching full energy operation in Dec 2012.

When it opened, it was China's costliest single science facility.

The facility "has played a key role in revealing the inner mechanism of various cancers."

== Construction ==
It has a circumference of 432 metres, and is designed to operate at 3.5 GeV, the highest energy of any synchrotron other than the Big Three facilities SPring-8 in Hyōgo Prefecture, Japan, ESRF in Grenoble, France and APS at Argonne National labs, United States. It will initially have eight beamlines.

The particle accelerator cost 1.2 billion yuan (US$176 million). It is China's biggest light facility. It is located under a building with a futuristic snail-shaped roof.

The synchrotron opened to universities, scientific institutes and companies for approved research in May 2009.

- Dec. 2004 – Sept. 2006: Building construction
- Jun. 2005 – Mar. 2008: Accelerator equipment and components manufacture and assembly
- Dec. 2005 – Dec. 2008: Beamline construction and assembly
- Apr. 2007 – Jul. 2007: Linac commissioning
- Oct. 2007 – Mar. 2008: Booster commissioning
- Apr. 2008 – Oct. 2008: Storage ring commissioning
- Nov. 2008 – Mar. 2009: ID Beamline commissioning
- Apr. 2009: The SSRF operation begins
