= Markman =

Markman is a surname. Notable people with the surname include:

- Damien Markman (born 1978), English footballer
- Ellen Markman, American psychologist and academic
- Gerry Markman, Canadian guitarist
- Hillel Markman (1930–2022, Israeli ballet dancer
- Lilah Markman (born 1971), Israeli artist
- Maurie Markman, American oncologist and academic
- Orli Markman (born 1969), Israeli military official
- Ronald Markman (1931–2017), American cartoonist
- Stephen Markman (born 1949), American judge from Michigan

== See also ==
- Markman hearing, pretrial hearing in a U.S. District Court patent claim
- Markman v. Westview Instruments, Inc., United States Supreme Court case on the interpretation of patent claims
- Markan (disambiguation)
- Marksman (disambiguation)
