= Markman (disambiguation) =

Markman is an English surname.

Markman may also refer to:

== Law ==
- Markman hearing
- Markman v. Westview Instruments, Inc.

== Places ==
- Markman, Eastern Cape, an industrial suburb of Port Elizabeth, South Africa on Regional Route R335
