= Caiyun =

Caiyun could refer to:

- Caiyun, Yunnan (Chinese: 彩云镇), a town in Shizong County, Yunnan, China
- Fu Caiyun (Chinese: 傅彩云, pseudonym of Sai Jinhua (1872–1936), Chinese prostitute
- Sun Caiyun (Chinese: 孙彩云; born 1973), Chinese pole vaulter
- Yan Caiyun (1902–1993), Chinese biochemist
- Zuo Caiyun (born 1996), Chinese para-athlete
