= Chinese Biological Investigators Society =

Non-profit professional life sciences organization

Chinese biological inverstigator society

The Chinese Biological Investigators Society (Chinese: 华人生物学家协会), the former Ray Wu Society (Chinese: 吴瑞协会), is a non-profit professional organization of life sciences and education, established in 1987. CBIS is an international platform for professional interactions, scientific collaborations, public communication, scocial environment, and biology education for global Chinese biologists. CBIS holds conference biennially and emphasizes on biological discoveries of foundamental importance. The current president is Yingzi Yang.

== History ==
=== Ray Wu's contribution ===
CBI Society began in January 1998, formerly known as the Ray Wu Society, which was established to honor Ray Wu's contributions in biochemistry and molecular biology and efforts in establishing the Sino-America science and education programs. Ray Wu created the first DNA sequencing method which is still used. His foundation of Sino-America science and education program helped more 400 students in biology. Many of these students become young scientists.

=== Awards ===
- Ray Wu Award (also the "RW Society Award" before 2003): The highest honor for CBIS members who have made fundamental discoveries in life sciences and/or significant contributions in promoting life sciences.
- The Young Investigator Award: for CBIS members who have made important contributions in their professional fields in early years of career.

=== Historical conferences and presidents ===
- 1987, 1st conference, New York City
- 1989, 2nd conference, Boston
- 1991, 3rd conference, New York
- 1998, 4th conference, Los Angeles, US The formation of Ray Wu Society (Junlin Guan, president)
- 2000, 5th conference, Cape Cod, US (Yang Shi, president)
- 2002, 6th conference, San Diego, US (Yang Shi, president)
- 2005, 7th conference, Boulder, US (Tian Xu, president. Ray Wu Society name changed to CBIS )
- 2007, 8th conference, Beijing, China (Yigong Shi, president)
- 2009, 9th conference, San Diego, US, (Min Li, president)
- 2011, 10th conference, Zhang Jia Jie, China (Yang Liu, president)
- 2013, 11th conference, Cancun, Mexico (Linheng Li, president)
- 2016, 12th conference, Chengdu, China (Weimin Zhong, president)
- 2018, 13th conference, Shenzhen, China (Hao Wu, president)
- 2022, 14th conference, Las Vegas, US (Yibin Kang, president)
- 2024, 14th conference, Guiyang, GuiZhou, China (Lee Zou, president)

=== Lists of Awarded Fellows ===
| Year | Awards | Name | University |
|---|---|---|---|
| 2024 | Ray Wu Award | Bing Ren | University of California, San Diego |
| 2024 | Ray Wu Award | Junyin Yuan | Chinese Academy of Sciences |
| 2024 | Young Investigator Award | Qing Zhang | University of Texas Southwestern Medical Center |
| 2024 | Young Investigator Award | Wei Xie | Tsinghua University |
| 2024 | Teaching Award | Xin-Hua Feng | Zhejiang University |
| 2022 | Ray Wu Award | Manyuan Long | The University of Chicago |
| 2022 | Ray Wu Award | Chuan He | The University of Chicago |
| 2022 | Young Investigator Award | Chenqi Xu | Chinese Academy of Sciences |
| 2022 | Young Investigator Award | Nan Hao | University of California San Diego |
| 2022 | Teaching Award | Guo-Min Li | University of Texas Southwestern Medical Center |
| 2018 | Ray Wu Award | Zhijian James Chen | UT Southwestern Medical Center |
| 2018 | Ray Wu Award | Xinnian Dong | Duke University |
| 2018 | Young Investigator Award | Kun Zhang | University of California San Diego |
| 2018 | Young Investigator Award | Zhihua Liu | Chinese Academy of Sciences |
| 2018 | Teaching Award | Liqun Luo | Stanford University |
| 2016 | Ray Wu Award | Xiaoliang Sunney Xie | Harvard University and BIOPIC at Peking University |
| 2016 | Ray Wu Award | Xiang-Dong Fu | University of California, San Diego |
| 2016 | Young Investigator Award | Ling-ling Chen | Chinese Academy of Sciences |
| 2016 | Young Investigator Award | Hai Qi | School of Medicine, Tsinghua University |
| 2016 | Teaching Award | Chenjian Li | School of Life Sciences, Peking University |
| 2013 | Ray Wu Award | Xiao-Fan Wang | Duke University |
| 2013 | Ray Wu Award | Haifan Lin | Yale University |
| 2013 | Young Investigator Award | Yibin Kang | Princeton University |
| 2013 | Young Investigator Award | Feng Shao | National Institute of Biological Sciences |
| 2011 | Ray Wu Award | Kun-Liang Guan | University of California, San Diego |
| 2011 | Ray Wu Award | Yigong Shi | Tsinghua University |
| 2011 | Young Investigator Award | Xinzhong Dong | Johns Hopkins University School of Medicine |
| 2011 | Teaching Award | Weimin Zhong | Yale University |
| 2009 | Ray Wu Award | Yi Zhang | Harvard Medical School |
| 2009 | Ray Wu Award | Yang Shi | Harvard University |
| 2009 | Young Investigator Award | X.Z. Shawn Xu | University of Michigan |
| 2007 | Lifetime Achievement Award | Ray Wu | Cornell University |
| 2007 | Ray Wu Award | Bai Lu | National Institutes of Health |
| 2005 | RW Society Award | Yi Rao | Washington University |
| 2002 | RW Society Award | Mu-ming Poo | University of California at Berkeley |
| 2000 | RW Society Award | Zuo-yan Zhu | National Natural Science Foundation of China |

=== The voice on "Racial Profiling" ===
In 2019, CBIS, united other science societies, including the Society of Chinese Bioscientists in America (SCBA) and the Chinese American Hematologist and Oncologist Network (CAHON), jointly voiced the pressing concerns on racial profiling in a letter titled Racial Profiling Harms Science in Science (journal), which later attracted a widespread formal discussions among media and journals, including Los Angeles Times, Nature, University World News, inside higher ed, axios, wbur, the guardian, Higher Education, Science news, etc.
