= Haifan Lin =

American geneticist

- 林海帆
- Born: Dongtou, Wenzhou, China
- Education: Fudan University; Cornell University
- Known for: Research on stem cells, piRNAs, and germline biology
- Awards: NIH Director's Pioneer Award
- Scientific career
- Fields: Cell biology, stem cell biology, developmental biology
- Workplaces: Yale University

Haifan Lin (Chinese: 林海帆; pinyin: Lín Hǎifān) is a Chinese-born American stem cell biologist. He is the Eugene Higgins Chair Professor of Cell Biology at Yale University and the founding Director of the Yale Stem Cell Center. He previously founded and directed the Stem Cell Research Program at Duke University. Recognized for his significant contributions to stem cell research, he was elected to the US National Academy of Sciences and American Academy of Arts and Sciences in 2018, the Chinese Academy of Sciences as a Foreign Member in 2021, and the US National Academy of Medicine in 2024.

== Biography ==
Lin was born in Dongtou, Wenzhou, Zhejiang, China. In 1982, he graduated from Fudan University in Shanghai with a bachelor's degree in biochemistry. He moved to the United States to pursue graduate studies at Cornell University and earned his PhD in 1990 in genetics and development. He subsequently worked as a Jane Coffin Childs Fellow for Medical Research at the Carnegie Institution for Science.

In 1994, he became a faculty member of Duke University School of Medicine, and later established the Stem Cell Research Program in 2005. In 2006, Lin moved to Yale University, where he founded the Yale Stem Cell Center and served as its director. He is also the Eugene Higgins Chair Professor of Cell Biology, Professor of Genetics, of Obstetrics, Gynecology, & Reproductive Sciences, and of Dermatology at Yale School of Medicine.

From 2014 to 2022, Lin served concurrently as the adjunct founding dean of ShanghaiTech University's School of Life Science and Technology in China, while retaining his positions at Yale.

Lin's work is focused on the self-renewing mechanism of stem cells, especially the small-RNA-mediated gene regulation mechanism. His research uses Drosophila germline stem cells, mouse germline stem cells, and mouse embryonic stem cells as models. He also studies germline development and stem cell-related cancers.

Lin is recognized for his contributions to stem cell and developmental biology research, especially for his discoveries of the Piwi/Argonaute (AGO) gene family and the Piwi-interacting RNAs (piRNAs), and for contributing to the demonstration of asymmetric stem cell division and to the proof of the stem cell niche theory. The journal Science named the discovery of piRNAs as one of the ten most important breakthroughs in 2006. In recent years, he demonstrated the crucial roles of the Piwi-piRNA pathway in epigenetic programming and post-transcriptional regulation of mRNA and lncRNA (see Select Bibliography).

Lin has played numerous leadership roles globally in the scientific community. He is President (2022-2023) of the International Society for Stem Cell Research (ISSCR) and has served as Director (2009-2019, 2020–present), Treasurer (2013-2016), Executive Committee Member, Vice President (2020-2021), and President-Elect (2021-2022) of ISSCR; Chair of the Finance Committee (2013-2016); Chair the Publications Committee (2009-2012), and Chair the Annual Meeting Program Committee (2010-2011) of the ISSCR. He led the establishment of ISSCR's official journal, Stem Cell Reports (2010-2012).

Lin has also served on the Medical Advisory Board of New York Stem Cell Foundation (2009–present), the US National Institutes of Health (NIH) Director's Pioneer Award Selection Committee (2009), the NIH study sections (1998-2005, 2007, 2012, 2014, 2019–2020), the Board of Directors of the Society of Chinese Biological Investigators, USA (2002-2008), the Council of the Society of Chinese Bioscientists in America (2008-2011), the Advisory Council of RIKEN Center for Developmental Biology, Japan (2007-2015), the Scientific Advisory Board of the Jane Coffin Childs Memorial Fund for Medical Research (2011-2015), National Key Stem Cell Research Advisory Committee, Chinese Ministry of Science and Technology (2011-2014), the Council of Shantou University (2010-2015), and the Council of Connecticut Academy of Science and Engineering (2013-2016). He was a co-founder and Core Member of the Connecticut State Government Life Sciences Advisory Group (2011-2012) and served on the advisory board of Connecticut Innovation Bioscience Fund (2017-2020).

== Honors ==
Academic Awards:

- Francis Amory Prize in Reproductive Medicine and Physiology, American Academy of Arts and Sciences, 2024.
- Outstanding Science and Innovation Award, The Chinese Association for Science and Technology, USA, 2019.
- The Society for the Study of Reproduction Research Award, 2015.
- The G. Harold and Leila Y. Mathers Award, 2007, 2010, 2014.
- The Ray Wu Award (highest honor by the Chinese Biological Investigators Society, USA), 2013.
- The NIH MERIT Award, 2012.
- The NIH Director's Pioneer Award, 2010.
- The Ellison Medical Foundation Senior Scholar Award, 2010.
- Outstanding Fudan University Alumnus Award, North America Fudan Alumni Association, 2010.
- The Laura Hartenbaum Breast Cancer Foundation's Legacy for Hope Award, 2009.
- The American Society of Andrology Lecturer Award, 2008.
- The David and Lucile Packard Fellowship for Science and Engineering, 1996.
- American Cancer Society Junior Faculty Research Award, 1996.
- March of Dimes Basil O'Connor Scholar Research Award, 1996.
- The Jane Coffin Childs Fellow for Medical Research, 1990.
- Second Place, the Larry Sandler Memorial Award for the best Ph.D. thesis research in Genetics, Genetics Society of America, 1990.
- Sage Graduate Fellowship, Cornell University, 1989.
- The Wu Memorial Award, Cornell University; 1987.
- Fellowship (among top ten), the 1982 China and United States Biochemistry and Molecular Biology Examinations and Admissions (CUSBEA) Program.
- Inaugural Fudan University Scholarship; 1982.
- University-level Honors Student, Fudan University; 1980, 1981, and 1982.
- Honors Student, Fudan University; 1979.

Elected Memberships:

- Member, U.S. National Academy of Medicine, 2024.
- Foreign Member, the Chinese Academy of Sciences, 2021.
- Member, the US National Academy of Sciences, 2018.
- Member, the American Academy of Arts and Sciences, 2018.
- Fellow, the American Association for the Advancement of Science, 2010.
- Member, Connecticut Academy of Science and Engineering, 2007.

== China Initiative case ==
Lin was investigated by federal agencies under the Trump administration's China Initiative. The government's allegations against Lin remain unclear. He was not arrested or charged with any crime. Lin was temporarily suspended from Yale and banned from running his lab in January 2022. In April 2022, the case was dropped by the Biden administration's Department of Justice and Yale lifted Lin's suspension.

There was an outpouring of support for Lin by Yale faculty members during his suspension, including: a March 9, 2022, letter addressed to Yale University President Peter Salovey, and signed by nearly 100 Yale professors calling for Lin's full reinstatement. In addition, on March 17, 2022, the Yale Department of Cell Biology and the Yale Stem Cell Center published a joint statement noting that "Haifan Lin is not only a brilliant scientist and mentor, whose eminence has been recognized by election to the US National Academy of Sciences, but also a leader who we know to be of the utmost integrity. We have complete confidence in him. We are equally confident that the Department of Justice investigation will only reveal that he has been the victim of poorly conceived federal policies."

== Select Bibliography ==
- Cheng, Ee-Chun; Hsieh, Chia-Ling; Liu, Na; Wang, Jianquan; Zhong, Mei; Chen, Taiping; Li, En; Lin, Haifan (January 2021). "The Essential Function of SETDB1 in Homologous Chromosome Pairing and Synapsis during Meiosis". Cell Reports. 34 (1) 108575. doi:10.1016/j.celrep.2020.108575. PMC 8513770. PMID 33406415.
- Hsieh, Chia-Ling; Xia, Jing; Lin, Haifan (2020-08-17). "MIWI prevents aneuploidy during meiosis by cleaving excess satellite RNA". The EMBO Journal. 39 (16). doi:10.15252/embj.2019103614. ISSN 0261-4189. PMC 7429737. PMID 32677148.
- Uyhazi, Katherine E.; Yang, Yiying; Liu, Na; Qi, Hongying; Huang, Xiao A.; Mak, Winifred; Weatherbee, Scott D.; de Prisco, Nicola; Gennarino, Vincenzo A.; Song, Xiaoling; Lin, Haifan (2020-04-07). "Pumilio proteins utilize distinct regulatory mechanisms to achieve complementary functions required for pluripotency and embryogenesis". Proceedings of the National Academy of Sciences. 117 (14): 7851–7862. Bibcode:2020PNAS..117.7851U. doi:10.1073/pnas.1916471117. ISSN 0027-8424. PMC 7148564. PMID 32198202.
- Shi, S., Yang, Z.-Z., Liu, S. Yang, F. and Lin, H. (2020) PIWIL1 promotes gastric cancer via a piRNA-independent mechanism. PNAS, 117, 22390–22401.
- Watanabe, T., Cui, X., Yuan, Z., Qi, H. and Lin, H. (2018) MIWI2 targets RNA transcribed from piRNA-dependent regions for methylation in mouse prospermatogonia. EMBO Journal, 37:e95329.
- Zhang, M., Chen, D., Xia, J., Han, W., Hermes, G., Sestan, S., and Lin, H. (2017) Post-transcriptional regulation of mouse neurogenesis by Pumilio proteins. Genes & Development 31, 1–16.
- Peng, J. C.^{#,*}, Anton Valouev, A.^{#}, Liu, N., and Lin^{,} H. ^{*} (2016) Piwi maintains germline stem cells and oogenesis in Drosophila through negative regulation of Polycomb group proteins. Nature Genetics 48, 283–291. (^{#} co-first authors; ^{*}co-corresponding authors)
- Wang, Z., Liu, N., Shi, S., Liu, S. and Lin, H. (2016) The Role of PIWIL4, an Argonaute family protein, in breast cancer. J. Biol. Chem. 291, 10646–10658. (Faculty 1000 Prime "Paper of Special Significance")
- Watanabe, T., Cheng, E.-C., Zhong, M. Lin. H. (2015) Retrotransposons and pseudogenes regulate mRNAs and lncRNAs via the piRNA pathway in the germline. Genome Research 25: 368–380.
- Juliano^{,} C. E., Reich, A., Liu, N., Uman, S., Wessel, G., W., Steele, R. E., and Lin, H. (2014) Analysis of the PIWI-piRNA pathway in Hydra somatic stem cells. PNAS 111, 337–342.
- Saxe, J. P., Chen, M., Zhao, H., and Lin, H. (2013) Tdrkh is essential for spermatogenesis and participates in primary piRNA biogenesis in the germline. EMBO J. 32, 1869–1885.
- Huang, X. A. ^{*}, Yin^{*}, H., Sweeney, S., Raha, D., Snyder, M. and Lin, H. (2013) A major epigenetic programming mechanism guided by piRNAs. Developmental Cell 24, 502-516 (^{*}co-first authors; Featured Article)
- Beyret, E. and Lin, H. (2012) piRNA biogenesis in the adult mouse is independent of the ping-pong mechanism. Cell Research 22:1429-1439. (Cover call-out paper).
- Chen, D., Zheng, W. Lin, A., Uyhazi, K., Zhao, H., and Lin, H.^{.} (2012) Pumilio 1 Suppresses Multiple Activators of p53 to Safeguard Spermatogenesis. Current Biology 22, 420–425.
- Gangaraju, V. K., Yin, H., Weiner, M. M., Wang, J., Huang, A. X., and Lin, H. (2010) Drosophila Piwi Functions in Hsp90-Mediated Suppression of Phenotypic Variation. Nature Genetics 43, 153–158.
- Szakmary, A., Mary Reedy, M., Qi, H.-Y., and Lin, H. (2009) The Yb protein localizes to a novel cytoplasmic structure and regulates germline stem cell division in both male and female Drosophila. J. Cell. Biol. 185: 613 - 627.
- Wang, J., Saxe, J. P., Tanaka, T., Chuma, S., and Lin, H. (2009) Mili interacts with Tudor Domain Containing Protein 1 (Tdrd1) in regulating spermatogenesis. Curr. Biol. 19:640 - 644 (Cover story).
- Yin, H. and Lin, H. (2007) An epigenetic activation role of PIWI and a PIWI-associated piRNA in Drosophila melanogaster. Nature 450, 304–308.
- Brower-Toland, Brent; Findley, Seth D.; Jiang, Ling; Liu, Li; Yin, Hang; Dus, Monica; Zhou, Pei; Elgin, Sarah C.R.; Lin, Haifan (2007-09-15). "Drosophila PIWI associates with chromatin and interacts directly with HP1a". Genes & Development. 21 (18): 2300–2311. doi:10.1101/gad.1564307. ISSN 0890-9369. PMC 1973144. PMID 17875665.
- Megosh, H.*, Cox*, D. N., Chris Campbell, C. and Lin, H. (2006) The Role of PIWI and the miRNA machinery in Drosophila germline determination. Current Biology. 16, 1884–1894 (*co-first authors).
- Grivna, S. T., Pyhtila, B. and Lin, H. (2006) MIWI associates with translational machinery and PIWI-interacting RNAs (piRNAs) in regulating spermatogenesis. Proc. Natl. Acad. Sci. 103, 13415–13420. (cited as one of the Ten Breakthroughs of 2006 by Science)
- Grivna, S. T. *, Beyret, E. *, Wang, Z. and Lin, H. (2006) A novel class of small RNAs in mouse spermatogenic cells. Genes & Development 20, 1709-1714 (*co-first authors; Cover call-out story; cited as one of the Ten Breakthroughs of 2006 by Science)
- Wang, Z and Lin, H. (2004) nanos maintains germline stem cell self-renewal by preventing differentiation. Science 303, 2016–2019.
- Deng, W. and Lin, H. (2002) miwi, a murine homolog of piwi, encodes a cytoplasmic protein essential for spermatogenesis. Developmental Cell 2, 819–830.
- King, F., J., Szakmary, A., Cox, D.N., and Lin, H. (2001) Yb modulates the division of both germline and somatic stem cells through piwi- and hh-mediated mechanisms in the Drosophila ovary. Molecular Cell 7, 497–508.
- Cox, D. N., Chao, A., Baker, J., Chang, L., Qiao, D. and Lin, H. (1998). A novel class of evolutionarily conserved genes defined by piwi are essential for stem cell self-renewal. Genes & Development. 12, 3715–3727. [Cover call-out story]
- Forbes, A., Spradling, A. C, Ingham, P., and Lin, H. (1996) The role of segment polarity genes during early oogenesis Drosophila. Development, 122, 3283–3294.
- Lin, H. and Spradling, A. C. (1997) A novel group of pumilio mutations affects the asymmetric division of germline stem cells in the Drosophila ovary. Development, 124, 2463–2476.
- Lin, H. and Spradling, C. S. (1993) Germline Stem Cell Division and Egg Chamber Development in Transplanted Drosophila Germaria. Dev. Biol. 159, 140–152.
- Lin, H. and Wolfner, M. F. (1991) The Drosophila maternal effect gene fs(1)Ya encodes a cell cycle dependent nuclear envelope component required for embryonic mitoses. Cell 64, 49–62.
