= Ornelas =

Ornelas may refer to:

== People ==
- Aires de Ornelas e Vasconcelos (1875–1879), Roman Catholic Archbishop of Goa
- Aires de Ornelas e Vasconcelos, 1st Lord of Dornelas and Caniço (1866–1920), Portuguese military officer, writer and politician
- António Evaristo de Ornelas, 1st Baron of Ornelas (1829–1904), Portuguese nobleman and physician
- Arban Severin (née Arban Ornelas; born 1976), composer, musician, and film actress
- Brás de Ornelas da Câmara, 13th Captain-Donee of Praia (1642–1709), Portuguese nobleman and politician
- Diogo de Ornelas de França Carvalhal Frazão e Figueiroa, 1st Count of Calçada (1812–1906), Portuguese industrialist and politician
- Fernando de Ornelas (born 1976), Venezuelan football player
- Francisco Ornelas da Câmara, 12th Captain-Donee of Praia (1606–1664), Portuguese nobleman and politician
- Hélder Ornelas, Portuguese long-distance runner
- Jaime Ornelas Camacho (1921–2016), Portuguese politician
- Jonathan Ornelas (born 2000), American baseball player
- Marta Domingo (née 1935), Mexican opera soprano, stage director and designer
- Nivaldo Ornelas, musician; see Nascimento
- Óscar Ornelas (1920–2000), Mexican lawyer and politician and member of Institutional Revolutionary Party
- Teotónio de Ornelas Bruges, 1st Count of Praia da Vitória (1807–1870), Portuguese landowner and politician

== Other uses ==
- Ornelas v. United States (1996), a case decided by the Supreme Court of the United States
