= Zhang Yi =

Zhang Yi may refer to:

- Zhang Yi (Warring States period) (bef. 329 BC–309 BC), strategist during the Warring States Period
- Zhang Yi (Junsi) (c. 167–230), official of Shu Han during the Three Kingdoms period
- Zhang Yi (Bogong) (died 264), general of Shu Han during the Three Kingdoms period
- Zhang Yi (Cao Wei) (fl. 227–232), author and doctor of Cao Wei of the Three Kingdoms period
- Zhang Yi (Tang dynasty) (died 783), official during the Tang Dynasty
- Chang Yi (actor) (born 1945), or Zhang Yi, Hong Kong actor
- Zhang Yi (politician) (born 1950), Communist Party Chief of Ningxia
- Chang Yi (director) (1951–2020), Taiwanese film director
- Yi Zhang (biochemist), Chinese-American biochemist
- Zhang Yi (actor) (born 1978), Chinese actor
- Zhang Yi (badminton) (born 1980), Chinese badminton player
- Zhang Yi (triathlete) (born 1987), female Chinese triathlete
- Zhang Yi (footballer) (born 1993), Chinese footballer

== See also ==
- Zhang Ni (died 254), often misspelled as Zhang Yi, general of Shu Han during the Three Kingdoms period
- Changyi (disambiguation)
