= Ornelas v. United States =

- Supreme Court of the United States

Argued March 26, 1996 Decided May 28, 1996
- Full case name: Saul Ornelas and Ismael Ornelas-Ledesma v. United States
- Citations: 517 U.S. 690 (more) 116 S.Ct. 1657; 134 L. Ed. 2d 911; 64 U.S.L.W. 4373

Case history
- Prior: Defendants convicted, Eastern District of Wisconsin; affirmed, 52 F.3d 328 (7th Cir. 1995); certiorari granted, 516 U.S. 963 (1995).
- Subsequent: Conviction affirmed, 96 F.3d 1450 (7th Cir. 1996)

Holding
- Probable cause determinations for warrantless searches are reviewed de novo.

Court membership
- Chief Justice William Rehnquist Associate Justices John P. Stevens · Sandra Day O'Connor; Antonin Scalia · Anthony Kennedy; David Souter · Clarence Thomas; Ruth Bader Ginsburg · Stephen Breyer

Case opinions
- Majority: Rehnquist, joined by Stevens, O'Connor, Kennedy, Souter, Thomas, Ginsburg, Breyer
- Dissent: Scalia

Laws applied
- U.S. Const. amend. IV

Ornelas v. United States, 517 U.S. 690 (1996), was a case decided by the Supreme Court of the United States that held that appellate courts should review probable cause determinations for warrantless searches de novo.

== Factual background ==
In December 1992, Detective Pautz of the Milwaukee Sheriff's Department was conducting drug interdiction when he noticed a 1981 two door Oldsmobile with California plates. Pautz radioed his dispatcher to check the registration of the car, and he ran the name of the owner, Miguel Ledesma Ornelas, through the Narcotics and Dangerous Drugs Information System (NADDIS). NADDIS reported that Ornelas was a heroin dealer. Two more officers arrived on the scene. An officer asked Ornelas if he had any contraband in the car, and Ornelas responded negatively. Detective Hurrle requested permission to search the car, and Ornelas consented. Deputy Luedke searched the car and noticed a loose door panel with a rusty screw. Deputy Luedke removed the panel and found two kilograms of cocaine. Ornelas and his accomplice, Ismael Ornelas-Ledesma, were arrested.

Ornelas filed a motion to suppress in the District Court. The court found that the officers had probable cause to remove the door panel and denied the motion. Ornelas was convicted and appealed to the Seventh Circuit. The Seventh Circuit reviewed the District Court's determination of probable cause on a deferential clear error standard and affirmed the conviction. The Supreme Court granted certiorari.

== Decision ==
=== Majority opinion ===
Writing for a majority of eight Justices, Chief Justice Rehnquist noted that the Supreme Court itself had never expressly deferred to the probable cause determination of lower courts. The Court reasoned that deferential appellate review could cause varied and inconsistent results, and that it would hinder the clarification of the law. De novo review would unify precedent and provide clearer guidance for police. The Court held that probable cause determinations for warrantless searches should be reviewed de novo, but also that "an appeals court should give due weight to a trial court's finding that the officer was credible and the inference was reasonable." Ornelas' conviction was vacated and the case was remanded to the Seventh Circuit.

=== Scalia's dissent ===
Justice Scalia dissented, arguing that probable cause determinations are necessarily fact intensive and unsuited to de novo review by an appellate court. Scalia also noted that true de novo review was inconsistent with giving due weight to police inferences.

== Subsequent history ==
On remand in the Seventh Circuit the court reviewed the probable cause determination de novo and affirmed the conviction.

== Impact ==
Ornelas was initially viewed as a victory for criminal defendants because de novo review was thought to be more critical and searching than deference to the District Court. David Sklansky, however, suggests that the "due weight" given police inferences is actually more favorable to law enforcement than a clear error standard for reviewing District Court determinations.

== See also ==
- List of United States Supreme Court cases, volume 517
