= Hsien Wu =

American geneticist

Wu Hsien
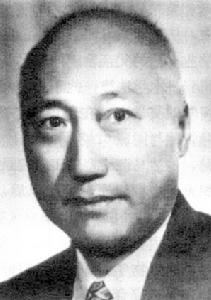
- Born: 24 November 1893; Fuzhou, Fujian, China
- Died: 8 August 1959 (aged 65); Boston, Massachusetts, United States
- Education: Harvard University; Massachusetts Institute of Technology
- Scientific career
- Fields: Protein science Biochemistry
- Workplaces: University of Alabama; Peking Union Medical College

Hsien Wu (simplified Chinese: 吴宪; traditional Chinese: 吳憲; pinyin: Wú Xiàn; 24 November 1893 – 8 August 1959) was a Chinese biochemist and geneticist. He was the first to propose that protein denaturation was a purely conformational change, i.e., corresponded to protein unfolding and not to some chemical alteration of the protein. This crucial idea was popularized later by Linus Pauling and Alfred Mirsky.

Wu was born in Fuzhou, Fujian, China. He studied at the Massachusetts Institute of Technology (undergraduate), and then trained at Harvard University (graduate) under Otto Folin, developing the first small-volume (≥ 0.1-mL sample) assay for blood sugar (Folin-Wu method). Wu then returned to China to a position at Peking Union Medical College, becoming head of the biochemistry department in 1924. At the end of that year, he married his research assistant Daisy Yen and would continue collaborating with her until his death in 1959.

Wu left China in 1947 to reside in the United States; his wife and children joined him in 1949.

Wu's son, Ray J. Wu, became the Liberty Hyde Bailey Professor of Molecular Genetics and Biology at Cornell University, and developed the first method for sequencing DNA and studying transgenic plants.
