= BMW of North America, Inc. v. Gore =

- Supreme Court of the United States

Argued October 11, 1995 Decided May 20, 1996
- Full case name: BMW of North America, Incorporated, Petitioner v. Dr. Ira Gore, Jr.
- Citations: 517 U.S. 559 (more) 116 S. Ct. 1589; 134 L. Ed. 2d 809; 1996 U.S. LEXIS 3390; 64 U.S.L.W. 4335; 96 Cal. Daily Op. Service 3490; 96 Daily Journal DAR 5747; 9 Fla. L. Weekly Fed. S 585

Case history
- Prior: Award of punitive damages upheld in Alabama Supreme Court

Holding
- Excessive punitive damages awards violate substantive due process.

Court membership
- Chief Justice William Rehnquist Associate Justices John P. Stevens · Sandra Day O'Connor; Antonin Scalia · Anthony Kennedy; David Souter · Clarence Thomas; Ruth Bader Ginsburg · Stephen Breyer

Case opinions
- Majority: Stevens, joined by O'Connor, Kennedy, Souter, Breyer
- Concurrence: Breyer, joined by O'Connor, Souter
- Dissent: Scalia, joined by Thomas
- Dissent: Ginsburg, joined by Rehnquist

Laws applied
- U.S. Const. amend. XIV

BMW of North America, Inc. v. Gore, 517 U.S. 559 (1996), was a United States Supreme Court case limiting punitive damages under the Due Process Clause of the Fourteenth Amendment.

== Facts ==
The plaintiff, Dr. Ira Gore, bought a new BMW, and later discovered that the vehicle had been repainted before he bought it. Defendant BMW of North America revealed that their policy was to sell damaged cars as new if the damage could be fixed for less than 3% of the cost of the car. Dr. Gore sued, and an Alabama jury awarded $4,000 in compensatory damages (lost value of the car) and $4 million in punitive damages, which was later reduced to $2 million by the Alabama Supreme Court. The punitive damages resulted not only from Dr. Gore's damages, but from BMW's egregious behavior across a broad spectrum of BMW purchasers over a multi-year period of time in which BMW repaired damaged vehicles and sold them as new to unsuspecting buyers as a matter of routine business operation. The decision of the Alabama Supreme Court was then appealed to the United States Supreme Court.

== Issue ==
Whether excessively high punitive damages violate the Due Process clause of the Constitution.

== Opinion of the Court ==
The Court, in an opinion by Justice Stevens, found that the excessively high punitive damages in this case violate the Due Process clause. For punitive damages to stand, the damages must be reasonably necessary to vindicate the State's legitimate interest in punishment and deterrence. Punitive damages may not be "grossly excessive" – if they are, then they violate substantive due process.

The Supreme Court applied three factors in making this determination:

1. The degree of reprehensibility of the defendant's conduct;
2. The ratio to the compensatory damages awarded (actual or potential harm inflicted on the plaintiff); and
3. Comparison of the punitive damages award and civil or criminal penalties that could be imposed for comparable misconduct.

Using these factors, the Court found that BMW's conduct was not particularly reprehensible (no reckless disregard for health or safety, nor even evidence of bad faith). The ratio of actual or potential damages to punitive damages was suspiciously high. Finally, the criminal sanctions available for similar conduct were limited to $2,000, making the $2 million assessment the equivalent of a severe criminal penalty.

The Court noted, however, that these three factors can be over-ridden if it is "necessary to deter future conduct".

Dissenting opinions were written by Justice Scalia and Justice Ginsburg, both contending that the Constitution was not implicated here, raising principles of federalism.

== Aftermath ==
On remand, the Supreme Court of Alabama ordered a new trial unless plaintiff accepted a remittitur of all but $50,000 of the punitive damages awarded. The court reasoned that it may not have given sufficient weight to the degree of reprehensibility of BMW's conduct, and selected the $50,000 as in the range of other Alabama verdicts in cases of repaired cars being sold as new. Dr. Gore accepted the remittitur, and on September 10, 1997, the Alabama Supreme Court issued a certificate of judgment affirming the reduced punitive damages award of $50,000, plus interest and costs.

== Federalism questions ==
In an academic article, following the arguments raised by the dissenting justices, Patrick Hubbard has questioned the appropriateness of federal courts reading substantive rights into the Due Process Clause of the United States Constitution in order to preempt the role of state courts and legislatures. These same people say the Court should not spend its time as a "super jury", second-guessing jury verdicts, but rather, "[T]he court should be more deferential to state courts and legislatures, and more concerned with developing a coherent framework."

== See also ==
- State Farm v. Campbell (2003)
- List of United States Supreme Court cases, volume 517
- List of United States Supreme Court cases
- Lists of United States Supreme Court cases by volume
- List of United States Supreme Court cases by the Rehnquist Court
