= Daisy Yen Wu =

Chinese biochemist (1902–1993)

- 严彩韵
- Daisy Yen and Hsien Wu with their children, c. 1950s
- Born: Yan Caiyun; 12 June 1902; Shanghai, China
- Died: 27 May 1993 (aged 90); Ithaca, New York, US
- Other name: Daisy Yen
- Occupations: Biochemist; philanthropist
- Years active: 1923–1993
- Spouse: Hsien Wu (m. 1924; died 1959)
- Children: 5, including Ray Wu
- Father: Yan Zijun
- Relatives: Yan Xinhou (grandfather); Yan Lianyun (sister); Juliana Young Koo (sister)
- Family: Yan family

Daisy Yen Wu (Chinese: 吴严彩韵, 12 June 1902 – 27 May 1993) was the first Chinese woman engaged as an academic researcher in biochemistry and nutrition. Born into a wealthy industrial family in Shanghai, from a young age she was tutored in English and encouraged to study. She graduated from Nanjing Jinling Women's University in 1921 and then studied in the United States, graduating with a master's degree in biochemistry from Teachers College, Columbia University in 1923. Returning to China, she became an assistant professor at Peking Union Medical College between 1923 and her marriage at the end of 1924 to Hsien Wu. Collaborating with him, she conducted research on proteins and studied nutrition. After their marriage she continued to assist in the research conducted by Wu as an unpaid staff member until 1928. She and her husband collaborated in writing the first Chinese textbook on nutrition, which remained in print through the 1990s.

While raising their children, Yen Wu recognized that educational opportunities were limited and founded the Mingming School (Chinese: 明明学校) in 1934 to provide a modern comprehensive education for Chinese children. She also raised funds in 1936 to build a school hospital for their alma mater, the Jinling Women's College, and earned a degree in French. In 1949, as her husband was in the United States and unable to return because of the Chinese Communist Revolution, she took the children abroad. Hired as a researcher for the Medical College of Alabama, she resumed collaboration with her husband, until his death in 1959. Moving to New York City in 1960, she conducted research for the United Nations Children's Fund to develop nutritional standards from 1960 to 1964. From 1964 to 1971 she worked as a lecturer and created a reference library for the Institute of Human Nutrition at Columbia University College of Physicians and Surgeons and from 1971 to 1987 she worked at St. Luke's Hospital Center, creating a library for the New York Obesity Research Center. Throughout her life, Yen Wu created numerous scholarships in China, Taiwan, and the United States which bear the name of family members and allow students to further their education. She died in 1993 in Ithaca, New York.

== Early life ==
Yan Caiyun was born on 12 June 1902 in Shanghai, China, to Yang Lifen (Chinese: 杨丽芬) and Yan Zijun (Chinese: 严子均). Her mother was a Christian and raised the couple's twelve children. Her father was from the well-to-do Yan family (Chinese: 费市严家) and was employed in the Ministry of Agriculture, Industry and Commerce. He eventually took over and managed the family businesses. Yan's paternal grandfather, Yan Xinhou (Chinese: 严信厚) served as an advisor to Li Hongzhang, an official of the Qing dynasty, and was an industrialist. He founded China's salt industry, as well as banks, factories, pharmacies, and tea shops around the country. Both her grandfather and father were also talented painters and calligraphers. Convinced of the importance of education, Yan Zijun hired university teachers to tutor the children from a young age in English and Chinese before they attended primary school in Shanghai.

In 1908, Yan entered McTyeire School, a private girls' school. In 1913, the family moved to Tianjin, where Yan and two of her sisters, Lianyun and Youyun prepared for the entrance exams of the Chinese and Western Girls' High School. She passed the examination and enrolled in the middle of 1914, completing her studies there in June 1917. She was admitted to Nanjing Jinling Women's University (later renamed Ginling College), earning a bachelor's degree with honours in 1921. As Yan was keen to continue her education, her father allowed her to go abroad to study in the United States. She enrolled in chemistry studies at Smith College in 1922, and began using the English name "Daisy Yen". Over the summer break, she took courses at the University of Chicago in chemistry, nutrition, and physics and the next fall enrolled in biochemistry courses at Teachers College, Columbia University. She studied nutrition, a field which at the time was in its infancy, under Henry Clapp Sherman and Mary Swartz Rose, taking particular interest in the analysis of vitamin content in food. She received her master's degree in May 1923.

== Career ==
=== Scientific work (1923–1928) ===
Yen was hired by the China Medical Board of the Rockefeller Foundation as an assistant professor in biochemistry at Peking Union Medical College and contracted for a year from September 1923. The biochemistry department had just been founded and Yen was its second employee. She lectured and worked as an assistant to Hsien Wu, whose research initially focused on blood chemistry. She assisted in his research on protein denaturation and published several papers with him: 关于稀酸、稀碱对蛋白质作用的一些新观察 (Some New Observations on the Effects of Dilute Acids and Bases on Proteins, 1924), 蛋白质变性的研究，I．稀酸和稀碱对蛋白质的影响 (Research on Protein Denaturation, I: The Effect of Dilute Acid and Alkali on Protein, 1924), 蛋白质的热变性 (Thermal Denaturation of Protein, 1925), and 乳胶体对有色溶液的作用 (The Effect of Latex on Colored Solution, 1926). These studies would later become the basis for Hsien Wu's theory on protein denaturation first presented in 1931.

Despite her contract being renewed for another year, when Yen and Wu decided to marry, she knew her position would be terminated, as there was a policy that spouses could not work together. The couple married on 20 December 1924 in Shanghai and Yen Wu resigned. They honeymooned in the United States and Yen Wu made plans to resume her studies and complete her doctoral work under Sherman at Columbia. She accompanied Hsien Wu to Europe and discovered she was pregnant, which put an end to her pursuit for further education, and she returned to China. Working as unpaid staff in Hsien Wu's lab, she continued to assist in research, but papers published rarely listed her name as the primary researcher. She also temporarily taught organic chemistry for students at the Xiehe Nursing School.

Yen Wu conducted her own research on nutrition for the biochemistry department, believed to be the first such studies carried out by a woman in China. She analyzed the chemical composition of many types of Chinese foods. Vitamin research was still in its infancy, but she determined the amount of carbohydrates, fat, fiber, protein, and water in various foods. Together with Hsien Wu, she began researching vegetarianism, the predominant Chinese diet at the time, using white mice as subjects, a technique Yen had learned from Sherman. By feeding one set of mice a typical diet based on grains such as corn, rice, sorghum, and wheat combined with peas, soybeans, and other vegetables; and another mouse group a diet of grain and meat, they discovered significant growth differentials and problems with rickets in the vegetarian group. Altering the vegetarian diet by adding bell peppers, cabbage, mustard greens, or rapeseed they found that growth rates were similar to the meat-eating mice and the animals had no signs of vitamin deficiencies.

Her next joint project with Hsien Wu was to conduct research on the diet of people in Beijing. The Department of Public Health and Sanitation collected materials from various groups throughout the country, including businesses, factories, farms, households, restaurants, and schools and presented their survey results to Yen and Hsien. They analyzed the survey, determining daily consumption rates of carbohydrates, fats, and proteins finding that the diet of people in Beijing was fairly representative of a typical diet throughout the country. They noted that compared to a Western diet, there were deficiencies in high-quality protein, calcium, phosphorus, and vitamins A and D. Their conclusions were that malnutrition was the cause of the high rates of disease and mortality, as well as intellectual disabilities and short stature, prevalent among Chinese children at the time. Their collaboration produced 营养概论 (Introduction to Nutrition, 1929) the first textbook on nutrition in China. Hsien Wu also published 中国食物之营养价值 (The Nutritional Value of Chinese Food, 1928) incorporating Yen's research.

=== Family and philanthropy (1929–1949) ===
In 1928, after the birth of her third child, Yen Wu withdrew from active work in the laboratory and focused on raising her children while compiling the research notes of her husband and assisting him in the development of his career. Within seven years of marrying, she had given birth to five children and was concerned about the level of educational opportunities available for them. She founded the Mingming School (Chinese: 明明学校) in 1934 with the aim of providing a modern comprehensive education and hired Wang Suyi, an alumnus of Columbia, as principal and a full-time teacher. The private school was operated by a board of her friends upon which she served as treasurer. Yen Wu was a member of various civic improvement clubs and worked with her sisters to raise funds in 1936 to build a school hospital for their alma mater, the Jinling Women's College. She returned to school, studying French at the Sino-French University and graduating in 1944. In 1947, Hsien Wu went to the United States to work as a visiting professor at Columbia University, but was unable to return because of the Chinese Communist Revolution. When the communists took over their home in Beijing in 1949, Yen Wu decided to join him abroad.

=== Life abroad (1949–1992) ===
Yen Wu brought the children to Birmingham, Alabama, where Hsien Wu had become chair of the biochemistry department at the University of Alabama. In 1950, she was hired to work as a biochemical researcher for the Medical College of Alabama. As before, she conducted research jointly with her husband, until he suffered a heart attack in 1953 and retired. They moved to Boston, where Yen Wu cared for Hsien Wu and compiled their research. Between 1949 and 1959, they published four papers and wrote three abstracts for presentation at academic conferences, mostly about amino acid metabolism. After Hsien Wu died on 8 August 1959, Yen Wu published her husband's biography and in 1960, moved to New York City, to be near her children.

In the spring of 1960, Yen Wu was hired as a researcher by the Food Conservation Division of the United Nations Children's Fund. She was tasked with testing various foods and making recommendations to improve nutritional standards for children. In 1961, she established the Yen Tse-King Memorial Scholarship, in honor of her father, and the Wu Hsien Memorial Scholarship, in honor of her husband, at the Tunghai University in Taichung, Taiwan. The scholarships were intended to be awarded annually to assist women students in become physicians or any student of biological chemistry in completing their education. In August 1964, Yen Wu went to work at the Institute of Human Nutrition at Columbia University College of Physicians and Surgeons, where she built a reference library and organized finding aids for the materials for the staff and students of the college.

In 1971, she retired but began working three days a week as a consultant in nutrition and metabolism for St. Luke's Hospital Center. Her work there was to establish the library for the New York Obesity Research Center. She also lectured on public health and nutrition at Columbia University. In addition to her employment, Yen Wu began editing and updating the publication 营养概论 (Introduction to Nutrition). She wrote eight supplemental chapters and a new edition of the book was published in Taiwan in 1974, and remained in print until the 1990s. (Note: The original publication was made in 1929 by Hsien Wu and a second revised edition was published in 1938. Yen Wu's work on the 3rd edition in the 1970s strove to maintain the style of the original book, but to update it with changes which had occurred over the intervening years.)

After a thaw in the Cold War relations between China and the US leading to normalization in the 1970s, Yen Wu returned to China. She visited relatives in 1980 and 1984. In 1983, she attended the celebration for the 70th anniversary of the founding of Jinling Women's University with family and former classmates. That year, she established a scholarship fund named after her husband to be awarded by the Chinese Academy of Medical Sciences to fund the research of professors who have contributed to the development of Chinese biochemistry and molecular biology. She retired in 1987 and lived alone until 1992, when she moved to the home of her eldest son in Ithaca, New York. In 1993, to honor her husband's 100th birthday, she donated funds to the Chinese Academy of Medical Sciences to establish a biochemical library and purchase books, and created a scholarship at Harvard Medical School, both bearing his name.

== Death and legacy ==
Yen Wu died on 27 May 1993 at Tompkins Community Hospital in Ithaca, after a heart attack, and was buried at Forest Hills Cemetery, in the Jamaica Plain neighborhood of Boston, Massachusetts. The Wus' research papers on metabolism, diet, and nutrition were foundational to the development of later ideas on modern Chinese health and nutrition. At the time their work was completed, it was one of the most influential in China and led the biochemical department at Peking Union Medical College to prioritize studying nutrition. The papers they produced have become a prerequisite to any discussion of the historical development of nutritional study in China.

The couple's son, Ray Wu, became a noted molecular biologist at Cornell University, having "developed the first method for sequencing DNA" and was "widely recognized as one of the fathers of plant genetic engineering." In addition to the scholarships she founded, the Hsien and Daisy Yen Wu Scholarship was founded at Cornell to assist graduate students in completing their education. Harvard has an endowed chair, the Hsien Wu and Daisy Yen Wu Professor of Biological Chemistry and Molecular Pharmacology, named in their honor.

== Selected works ==
- Wu, Hsien; Wu, Daisy Yen (May 1924). "Some New Observations Concerning the Effects of Dilute Acids and Alkalies on Proteins". Experimental Biology and Medicine. 21 (8). London: SAGE Publishing, for the Society for Experimental Biology and Medicine: 573–577. doi:10.3181/00379727-21-288. ISSN 1535-3702. OCLC 5135232655. S2CID 87542901.
- Wu, Hsien; Wu, Daisy Yen (October 1924). "Studies of Denaturation of Proteins". The Journal of Biological Chemistry. 4 (2). New York, New York: American Society of Biological Chemists, Rockefeller Institute for Medical Research: 345–384. ISSN 0021-9258.
- Wu, Hsien; Wu, Daisy Yen (1925). "Nature of Heat Denaturation of Proteins". The Journal of Biological Chemistry. 64 (2). New York, New York: American Society of Biological Chemists, Rockefeller Institute for Medical Research: 369–378. doi:10.1016/S0021-9258(18)84930-4. ISSN 0021-9258.
- Wu, Hsien; Wu, Daisy Yen (1928). "Studies of Dietaries in Peking". Chinese Journal of Physiology Report Series (1). Peking: Chinese Physiological Society: 135–152.
- Wu, Hsien; Wu, Daisy Yen (1928). "Growth of Rats on Vegetarian Diets". Chinese Journal of Physiology Report Series (2). Peking: Chinese Physiological Society: 173–194.
- Wu, Hsien; Wu, Daisy Yen (May 1950). "Influence of Feeding Schedule on Nitrogen Utilization and Excretion". Proceedings of the Society for Experimental Biology and Medicine. 74 (1). London: SAGE Publishing, for the Society for Experimental Biology and Medicine: 78–82. doi:10.3181/00379727-74-17815. ISSN 0037-9727. OCLC 5723957388. PMID 15430396. S2CID 84900168.
- Wu, Daisy Yen; Wu, Hsien (January 1951). "Determination of Urea in Saliva". Proceedings of the Society for Experimental Biology and Medicine. 76 (1). London: SAGE Publishing, for the Society for Experimental Biology and Medicine: 130–132. doi:10.3181/00379727-76-18412. ISSN 0037-9727. OCLC 5723749282. PMID 14816415. S2CID 30896746.
- Wu, Daisy Yen (1959). Hsien Wu, 1893–1959: In Loving Memory. Boston, Massachusetts: Daisy Yen Wu. OCLC 4184791.
- 吴 (Wu), 宪 (Hsien) (1974). 吴 (Wu), 严彩韵 (Daisy Yen) (ed.). 营养概论 [Introduction to Nutrition] (3rd ed.). Taiwan: 台湾商务出版社印行 (Taiwan Commercial Publishing House).
