= List of United States Supreme Court cases, volume 517 =

This is a list of all the United States Supreme Court cases from volume 517 of the United States Reports:

Case name	Citation	Date decided
Wisconsin v. City of New York	517 U.S. 1	1996
Barnett Bank of Marion Cty., N. A. v. Nelson	517 U.S. 25	1996
Seminole Tribe of Fla. v. Florida	517 U.S. 44	1996
Morse v. Republican Party of Va.	517 U.S. 186	1996
Rutledge v. United States	517 U.S. 292	1996
O'Connor v. Consolidated Coin Caterers Corp.	517 U.S. 308	1996
Lonchar v. Thomas	517 U.S. 314	1996
If a district court cannot dismiss a first habeas petition on the merits before a scheduled execution, it is obligated to address the merits and must issue a stay to prevent the case from becoming moot.
Shieh v. Kakita	517 U.S. 343	1996
Bowersox v. Williams	517 U.S. 345	1996
Cooper v. Oklahoma	517 U.S. 348	1996
Markman v. Westview Instruments, Inc.	517 U.S. 370	1996
Holly Farms Corp. v. NLRB	517 U.S. 392	1996
Carlisle v. United States	517 U.S. 416	1996
A District Court has no authority to grant a motion for judgment of acquittal filed one day outside the Rule 29(c) time limit.
United States v. Armstrong	517 U.S. 456	1996
44 Liquormart, Inc. v. Rhode Island	517 U.S. 484	1996
United States v. Noland	517 U.S. 535	1996
A bankruptcy court may not equitably subordinate claims on a categorical basis in derogation of Congress's priorities scheme.
Food and Commercial Workers v. Brown Group, Inc.	517 U.S. 544	1996
BMW of North America, Inc. v. Gore	517 U.S. 559	1996
Romer v. Evans	517 U.S. 620	1996
Henderson v. United States	517 U.S. 654	1996
The Suits in Admiralty Act's "forthwith" instruction for service of process has been superseded by Federal Rule of Civil Procedure 4.
Doctor's Associates, Inc. v. Casarotto	517 U.S. 681	1996
A state statute requiring disclosure of arbitration clauses to be "typed in underlined capital letters on the first page of the contract" is preempted by the Federal Arbitration Act; however, courts have the authority to refuse to enforce arbitration clauses on grounds of generally applicable contract defenses.
Ornelas v. United States	517 U.S. 690	1996
Quackenbush v. Allstate Ins. Co.	517 U.S. 706	1996
Smiley v. Citibank (South Dakota), N. A.	517 U.S. 735	1996
Loving v. United States	517 U.S. 748	1996
Auciello Iron Works, Inc. v. NLRB	517 U.S. 781	1996
Richards v. Jefferson County	517 U.S. 793	1996
When a party receives no notice of and no sufficient representation in litigation, it is a violation of federal due process to bind the party to the adjudication of that litigation.
Whren v. United States	517 U.S. 806	1996
Any traffic offense committed by a driver is a legitimate legal basis for a traffic stop.
Degen v. United States	517 U.S. 820	1996
A district court may not strike a claimant's filings in a civil forfeiture suit and grant summary judgment against them for failing to appear in a related criminal prosecution.
Exxon Co., U.S.A. v. Sofec, Inc.	517 U.S. 830	1996
A plaintiff in admiralty that is the superseding, and thus the sole proximate, cause of its own injury cannot recover part of its damages from tortfeasors or contracting partners whose blameworthy actions or breaches were causes in fact of the plaintiff's injury.
United States v. International Business Machines Corp.	517 U.S. 843	1996
The Export Clause prohibits assessment of nondiscriminatory federal taxes on goods in export transit.
Lockheed Corp. v. Spink	517 U.S. 882	1996
Shaw v. Hunt	517 U.S. 899	1996
Bush v. Vera	517 U.S. 952	1996
