= Wisconsin v. City of New York =

- Supreme Court of the United States

Argued January 10, 1996 Decided March 20, 1996
- Full case name: Wisconsin v. City of New York, et al.
- Citations: 517 U.S. 1 (more) 116 S. Ct. 1091; 134 L. Ed. 2d 167
- Argument: [The U.S. Secretary of Commerce refused to use post-enumeration survey statistical regulation to correct the 1990 census represented a violation of the Census Clause of the Constitution. Oral argument]

Case history
- Prior: The Secretary of Commerce determined that "actual Enumeration" would be best be resolved in the 1990 census not by using post-enumeration survey (PES) statistical regulation, which was devised to correct an undercount in the original enumeration.

Court membership
- Chief Justice William Rehnquist Associate Justices John P. Stevens · Sandra Day O'Connor; Antonin Scalia · Anthony Kennedy; David Souter · Clarence Thomas; Ruth Bader Ginsburg · Stephen Breyer

Case opinion
- Majority: Rehnquist, joined by unanimous

Laws applied
- Constitution's Census Clause

Wisconsin v. City of New York, 517 U.S. 1 (1996), was a United States Supreme Court case that held that under the Constitution's Census Clause, Congress is granted with the authority to conduct an "actual enumeration" of the American society, chiefly for the purpose of allocating congressional representation among the states.

Congress assigned the responsibility of conducting an "actual enumeration" of the American society to the Secretary of Commerce, who in the 1990 census, decided not to implement the statistical correction, better known as the post-enumeration survey (PES) to adjust an undercount in the initial population count.

Furthermore, following several citizens' groups, states, and cities, Wisconsin disputed the Secretary's decision not to use PES declaring that it resulted in an undercounting of certain identifiable minority groups.

== See also ==
- Wesberry v. Sanders (1964)
- Department of Commerce v. Montana (1992)
- Franklin v. Massachusetts (1992)
- Gaffney v. Cummings (1973)
