= Changyi (disambiguation) =

Changyi or Chang Yi was the second son of the Yellow Emperor and father of Zhuanxu.

== Cities ==
- Changyi, Shandong (昌邑市), county-level city
- Changyi District (昌邑区), Jilin City, Jilin
- Changxi, also known as Changyi, Chinese lunar deity
- Changyi Kingdom (昌邑國, 97 – 74 BC), a kingdom of the Han dynasty

== People ==
- Prince of Changyi (died 59 BC), emperor of the Chinese Han Dynasty for 27 days in 74 BC
- Chang Yi (actor) (born 1945), Hong Kong actor originally from Huizhou, China
- Chang Yi (director) (born 1951), Taiwan director
- Chang Yi (baseball), Taiwanese baseball player

== See also ==
- Zhang Yi (disambiguation)
