= Manyuan Long =

American evolutionary biologist, Guggenheim fellow

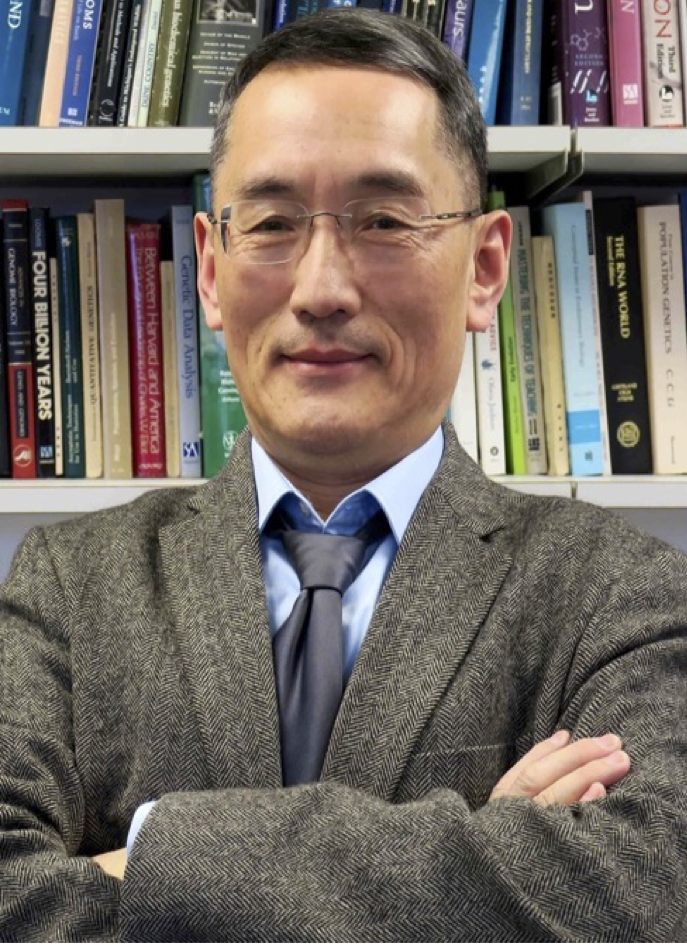
- Known for: New gene evolution
- Awards: Fellow of the Institute for Advanced Study in Berlin (Wissenschaftskolleg du Berlin) John Simon Guggenheim Memorial Fellowship for Natural Sciences, US and Canada David & Lucille Packard Fellowship for Science and Engineering (1998)
- Scientific career
- Fields: Genetics and Evolution
- Institutions: University of Chicago (1997) Harvard University (1992); University of California, Davis (1992) Sichuan Agricultural University (1985)
- Thesis: The Origin and Evolutionary Mechanism of New Genes (1992)
- Doctoral advisor: Charles H. Langley
- Website: https://manyuanlonglab.uchicago.edu/

Manyuan Long (simplified Chinese: 龙漫远; traditional Chinese: 龍漫遠; pinyin: Lóng Mànyuǎn) is a China-born American evolutionary biologist and geneticist. Long pioneered the studies of origination and evolution of new genes and received many awards including the John Simon Guggenheim Memorial Fellowship for Natural Sciences, US and Canada and the Ray Wu Award.

== Early life and education ==
Manyuan Long was born and grew up in a family of an ethnic minority group from the mountainous area of southwestern China, the Miao (also called Hmong). In the late stage of the political turmoil of the Cultural Revolution, after middle school, Long was exiled as "Sent-down youth" to a poor mountainous area in southern Sichuan.

Long studied in Sichuan Agricultural university and earned a baccalaureate in agronomy in 1982 and a master's degree in plant genetics and breeding in 1985, mentored by Zhiren Gao, a population geneticist trained by C.C. LI. In 1987, Long was admitted into the genetics graduate program at the University of California, Davis, where Long earned M.S. in genetics supervised by John Gillespie and a PhD in genetics mentored by Charles Langley in 1992. Long worked as postdoctoral fellow in Harvard University to research molecular biology and population genetics with Walter Gilbert and Richard Lewontin.

== Career and research ==
=== Academic career ===
Long worked as assistant professor in 1997, associate professor with tenure in 2003, full professor with tenure in 2005, in department of Ecology and Evolution at the University of Chicago. Long serves as the Edna K. Papazian Distinguished Service Professor since 2011.

=== New gene origination ===
==== Concept and approach ====
Long proposed and defined the concept of the "evolutionary new genes" or simply called "new genes" in early 1990s, different from the conventional belief that genes and their functions are stationary in evolution.

Long studies on the problem of new genes, or the origin of genes, since Long's doctoral research, by molecular biological experiments and computational analyses. To avoid inefficiency brought by multiple evolutionary events in ancient genes, Long chose to study new genes that recently originated in less than one to a few tens of million years, which turned to be a productive approach.

==== The first ever known new gene ====
In 1993, Long published the scientific problem of new gene evolution while researching a gene called Jingwei, the first ever known new gene. Long did postdoctoral research work for four and a half years, investigating the evolution of gene structures while continuing research on Jingwei.

==== New genes everywhere with patterns ====
Long and coworkers have investigated molecular mechanisms, rates, and patterns of new gene origination in species ranging from fruit flies to insects, humans, vertebrates, and plants. These analyses revealed the patterns of gene origination, for example, the rapid evolution of essential gene functions in fruit flies, gene traffics between the X chromosomes and autosomes, the out of testis expression evolution in fruit flies, and also in vertebrates and increasing structural complexity of new genes in evolution. Long's major research interests and contributions include the essentiality of new genes, de novo gene origination, and new genes creating and resolving sexual conflict. His research activities also cover the phenotypic innovation of new genes and the expression network of new genes.

==== Scientific impact ====
Long and coworkers' findings on new gene evolution were noted as examples in Nature Education library and the textbooks, for example Evolution, Molecular Evolution: a Phylogenetic Approach, and the Princeton Guide to Evolution. One of Long and coworkers' findings, de novo genes are far more commonly than previously thought, was rated as one of "15 studies that challenged medical dogma in 2019" (medscape).

==== Publication ====
Long and his teams have published 180 research reports, reviews, commentaries and popular science articles on origination and evolution of new genes with their newly derived functions and phenotypes.

=== The history of science ===
Long collaborated with Walter Gilbert to investigate and record important discoveries as molecular biology began to emerge as a field, driven by research in the labs of Walter Gilbert and other scientific pioneers of the era. Long oversaw the editing and publication of the book Walter Gilbert: Selected Works. Long and two scholars (Hongya Gu and Zhonghe Zhou) published another book, entitled Darwin's Heritage Today, regarding the history and impact of evolutionary biology research defined by Darwin since the publication of his work, On the Origin of Species, in 1859.

== Social impact ==
The new gene studies summarized by Long were presented in the case of Kitzmiller v. Dover Area School District and elsewhere in defense of the First Amendment to U.S. Constitution and the evolutionary biology.

== Awards and honors ==
1993 – Allen Marr Prize for the best Ph.D. thesis research in University of California, Davis, USA

1998 – David & Lucille Packard Fellowship for Science and Engineering

2003 – CAREER Award National Science Foundation

2011 – Inaugural Edna K Papazian Distinguished Service Professor The University of Chicago

2013 – Honorary Visiting professor, the National Institute of Genetics, Mishima, Japan.

2014 – Fellow, the American Association for the Advancement of Science

2019 – 15 Studies That Challenged Medical Dogma in 2019 Medscape

2020 – The Distinguished Investigator Award in Biology, University of Chicago, USA

2022 – The John Simon Guggenheim Memorial Fellowship for Natural Sciences (Biology), USA & Canada

2022 – The Ray Wu Award, USA

2025 – Fellow of the Institute for Advanced Study in Berlin (Wissenschaftskolleg du Berlin)
