= Maurie Markman =

American oncologist and academic

Maurie Markman is a physician and the President of Medicine & Science, City of Hope National Medical Center Atlanta, Chicago and Phoenix. He was previously the President of Medicine and Science at Cancer Treatment Centers of America and the Vice President for Clinical Research at M.D. Anderson Cancer Center at the University of Texas. In 1992 he was appointed the first Director of the Taussig Cancer Center at the Cleveland Clinic, a position he held for 12 years. During that time he was also Professor of Medicine and the Chairman of the Department of Hematology/Oncology at the Cleveland Clinic. He has also held appointments on the faculty of Memorial Sloan Kettering Cancer Center in NYC and Moores Cancer Center at the University of California, San Diego. He was named a "Giant of Cancer Care" in 2018 by OncLive.

Markman attended the University of Southern California as an undergraduate and the New York University School of Medicine. He completed his fellowships at Johns Hopkins School of Medicine and the National Cancer Institute and holds a master's in Public Health Administration from New York University School of Public Administration.
