= Ray Wu =

American geneticist (born 1928–2008)

Ray Jui Wu
- 吴瑞
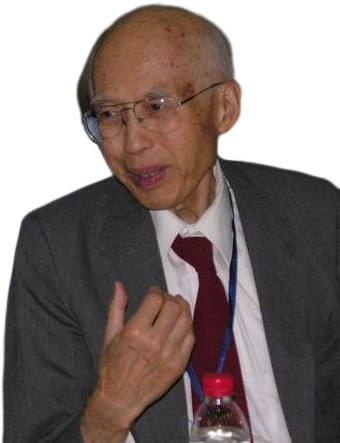
- Born: Jui Wu; August 14, 1928; Beijing, Republic of China
- Died: February 10, 2008 (aged 79); Ithaca, New York, U.S.
- Other names: Wu Rui, Wu Jui
- Education: University of Pennsylvania
- Scientific career
- Thesis: Studies on the Mechanisms of Pyrimidine Biosynthesis (1955)
- Doctoral advisor: D. Wright Wilson
- Doctoral students: Jack W. Szostak

Ray Jui Wu (Chinese: 吴瑞; pinyin: Wú Ruì; Wade–Giles: Wu Jui, 14 August 1928 – 10 February 2008) was a Chinese-born American geneticist and served as Liberty Hyde Bailey Professor of Molecular Genetics and Biology at Cornell University.

In 1970, Wu created the first approach for DNA sequencing, earlier than the Frederick Sanger's method in 1975 and Walter Gilbert's chemical procedure in 1977. Wu's contributions on DNA sequencing are fundamental to the general sequencing methods today.

== Biography ==
Wu was the son of Hsien and Daisy Yen Wu, both biologists who pioneered biochemical studies in China. Wu was born in Beijing in China; his ancestral hometown was Fuzhou of Fujian Province. Wu was educated in the United States and obtained his Ph.D. in biochemistry from the University of Pennsylvania in 1955.

Wu was a pioneer in DNA sequencing and genetic engineering, and is regarded as one of the founding fathers of plant genetic engineering.

Wu also was an active educator, and created the CUSBEA (China-US Biochemistry Examination and Application). In 1999, at Cornell, Wu donated US $500,000 to establish the Ray Wu Graduate Fellowship in Molecular Biology and Genetics to support biology graduate students.

Wu spent most of his scientific career at Cornell. Wu was an Academician of Academia Sinica (Taiwan), and a Foreign Member of the Chinese Academy of Engineering. Wu's former student Jack W. Szostak was awarded the 2009 Nobel Prize in Physiology or Medicine.

== Ray Wu Memorial Fund ==
The Ray Wu Memorial Fund (RWMF) is a nonprofit 501(c)(3) organization. RWMF administers the annual Ray Wu Prize for Excellence in Life Sciences that is established to inspire Asia's most promising young Ph.D. students to become future leaders in life sciences.

== Ray Wu Award ==
Ray Wu Award was established by the society to honor the late Dr. Ray Wu, who not only had a distinguished scientific career but also nurtured a new generation of Chinese scientists in life sciences through his tireless effort in promoting scientific and educational exchanges between China and the United States. The Award recognizes Chinese Biological Investigators Society (CBIS) members who have made fundamental discoveries in life sciences and/or significant contributions in promoting life sciences in China.
