= NADDIS =

United States government data index and collection system

The Narcotics and Dangerous Drugs Information System, or NADDIS, is a data index and collection system operated by the United States Drug Enforcement Administration (DEA). Comprising millions of DEA reports and records on individuals, NADDIS is a system by which intelligence analysts, investigators and others in law enforcement retrieve reports from the DEA's Investigative Filing and Reporting System (IFRS). NADDIS is thought to have become the most widely used, if least known, tool in drug law enforcement.

The database has been described by DEA as a "pointer index" by which records on millions of individuals, many with no criminal history, can be reviewed quickly to locate complete reports on a subject of interest, their address or phone number.

== NADDIS checks and individuals ==
A NADDIS check is the first step in any criminal drug inquiry and reveals the existence of any prior reports of investigation or mention in any file of an individual, business, airfield, plane, vessel or phone number. The existence of a NADDIS record on an individual has been employed to provide probable cause for airport searches, surveillance and home entries. By contrast, the absence of a NADDIS record has been grounds for permitting bond for criminal defendants.

NADDIS also is routinely used by DEA and other agencies to conduct background checks on prospective employees, contractors and informants, with a NADDIS check in one instance revealing a DEA database contractor's prior involvement in drug trafficking.

== The NADDIS access log ==
NADDIS logs the access of NADDIS by any authorized DEA employee and records the time, date, location and identity of the employee who requested access to a particular file. These access logs or "detail reports" have been utilized by DEA Headquarters to identify DEA employees who provided NADDIS records to criminal organizations or who have improperly accessed NADDIS21. Agencies' access logs have also been considered by district courts in resolving legal issues over the timing of agents' and prosecutors' awareness of investigative records on a subject. Thus, the use of NADDIS detail reports to detect government improprieties is similar to the use of other law enforcement database access logs in demonstrating police misconduct. For example, in Kansas the FBI's Interstate Identification Index (III) access log confirmed improper access by a sheriff who conducted criminal history checks against political opponents.

== Lack of public information ==
Efforts through the Freedom of Information Act (FOIA) to obtain a sample NADDIS record have often been rejected by DEA. The Seventh Circuit Court of Appeals has indicated its concerns about the "scanty" secondary literature on NADDIS, further noting that although it would be helpful "to know something about NADDIS", "the government has successfully opposed efforts to obtain discovery aimed at determining the character and reliability" of the system. There are few news articles discussing NADDIS, and only one criminology journal article discussing a failed request for NADDIS information. However, a few recent web-based documents involving DEA contractors have provided insight into the structure of NADDIS. In response to a FOIA request for NADDIS data by a criminologist for research purposes, DEA previously has provided only a sealed, non-public "'live' (simulated) NADDIS printout" for review by the district court in camera.

=== The First NADDIS record released by DEA through FOIA ===
In 2010, after a decision by the Department of Justice Office of Information Policy (OIP) and mediation by the National Archives and Records Administration (NARA) Office of Government Information Services (OGIS), DEA, in a change of policy, released for the first time an actual NADDIS record on an individual. This FOIA release, which was requested and litigated by an incarcerated researcher for records on an unrelated and deceased third party in an effort to characterize NADDIS, now permits any individual to obtain their NADDIS record, or that of any deceased third party, or any living third party (with a signed, original DOJ-361 release authorization). The DEA FOIA release demonstrates that NADDIS includes a "Remarks" section (p. 7-10 of the FOIA release, Id.) which contains the date and file number of each DEA report on a subject, and which abstracts and summarizes the content of the complete report. Hence, this recent FOIA release by DEA may be employed as an exhibit in pre-trial discovery requests for NADDIS records, or as an exhibit by other FOIA requestors seeking NADDIS records.

== The future of NADDIS ==
NADDIS has increasingly been employed and shared by multiple federal agencies post-9/11. NADDIS is likely to be included in the datasets of the more than 53 government agencies now contributing records to FBI's Investigative Data Warehouse (IDW) and the DHS Immigration and Customs Enforcement Pattern Analysis and Information Collection (ICEPIC) system. As an effective tool in the detection of terrorism-related heroin trafficking, NADDIS may be used to link Taliban-influenced Afghan government officials and heroin sources in Afghanistan for purposes of selective enforcement, more efficient allocation of federal agencies' resources, reduction of corruption, and for study and analysis of the terrorism-narcotics nexus. NADDIS is becoming an even more significant contributor to the intelligence community's (IC) datamarts for federal and international agencies' characterization of nascent and existing major violent narcotics organizations linked to terrorism. NADDIS through FOIA now is accessible to criminal justice policy researchers concerned with selective enforcement methods, violent crime demographics, drug epidemics and the impact of information-sharing on personal privacy and civil liberties.
