= Marksman (disambiguation) =

A marksman is a person who is skilled in shooting.

Marksman or The Marksman may also refer to:

== Military and police uses ==
- HMS Marksman, several Royal Navy ships
- Marksman class destroyer, a British class of World War I flotilla leaders
- Marksman anti-aircraft system, a British anti-aircraft system
- Mahindra Marksman, an Indian armored personnel carrier

== Films ==
- The Marksman (1953 film), an American Western film
- The Marksman (2005 film), an American action film
- The Marksman (2021 film), an American action thriller film

== People ==
- Herma Marksman (born 1949), Venezuelan historian
- Peter Marksman (c. 1817–1892), Native American Methodist minister
- Samori Marksman (1947–1999), Caribbean Pan-Africanist, Marxist, journalist, historian, political activist and teacher

== Other uses ==
- Coleco Telstar Marksman, a video game console
- Mansfield Marksman a defunct rugby league side
- On Mark Marksman, a 1960s American executive jet using Douglas A-26 Invader airframes
- Marksman, a lager brewed by the Mansfield Brewery
- Fayetteville Marksmen, a professional minor league ice hockey team based in Fayetteville, North Carolina
- Marksman, the Secret Service code name for Eric Trump

== See also ==
- Der Freischütz (The Marksman), an 1821 German opera
- Prairie Marksman, a former daily Amtrak passenger train
- The Marksmen, American country music group
