= Selective prosecution =

Legal defense based on claiming the prosecutor is discriminatory

In jurisprudence, selective prosecution is a procedural defense in which defendants argue that they should not be held criminally liable for breaking the law because the criminal justice system discriminated against them by choosing to prosecute. In claims of selective prosecution, defendants essentially argue that it is irrelevant whether they are guilty of violating a law, but that the fact of being prosecuted is based upon forbidden reasons. Such a claim might, for example, entail an argument that persons of different age, race, religion, sex, gender, or political alignment, were engaged in the same illegal acts for which the defendant is being tried yet were not prosecuted, and that the defendant is being prosecuted specifically because of a bias as to that class.

== In the United States ==
In the United States, this defense is based upon the Due Process Clause of the 5th Amendment and 14th Amendment, which stipulates, "nor shall any state deny to any person within its jurisdiction the equal protection of the laws." The U.S. Supreme Court has defined the term as: "A selective prosecution claim is not a defense on the merits to the criminal charge itself, but an independent assertion that the prosecutor has brought the charge for reasons forbidden by the Constitution." The defense is rarely successful; some authorities claim, for example, that there are no reported cases in at least the past century in which a court dismissed a criminal prosecution because the defendant had been targeted based on race. In United States v. Armstrong (1996), the Supreme Court ruled the Attorney General and United States Attorneys "retain 'broad discretion' to enforce the Nation's criminal laws" and that "in the absence of clear evidence to the contrary, courts presume that they have properly discharged their official duties." Therefore, the defendant must present "clear evidence to the contrary", which demonstrates "the federal prosecutorial policy 'had a discriminatory effect and that it was motivated by a discriminatory purpose.'"

Selective prosecution has been raised as a possible defense in the election obstruction case of Donald Trump, human smuggling case of Kilmar Abrego Garcia, and as a possible motivation for tax and firearms charges against Hunter Biden.

== See also ==
- Deferred prosecution
- Equal protection
- Malicious prosecution
- Political prisoner
- Racial profiling
- Selective enforcement
- Sentencing disparity
