= Yi Zhang (biochemist) =

Chinese-American biochemist

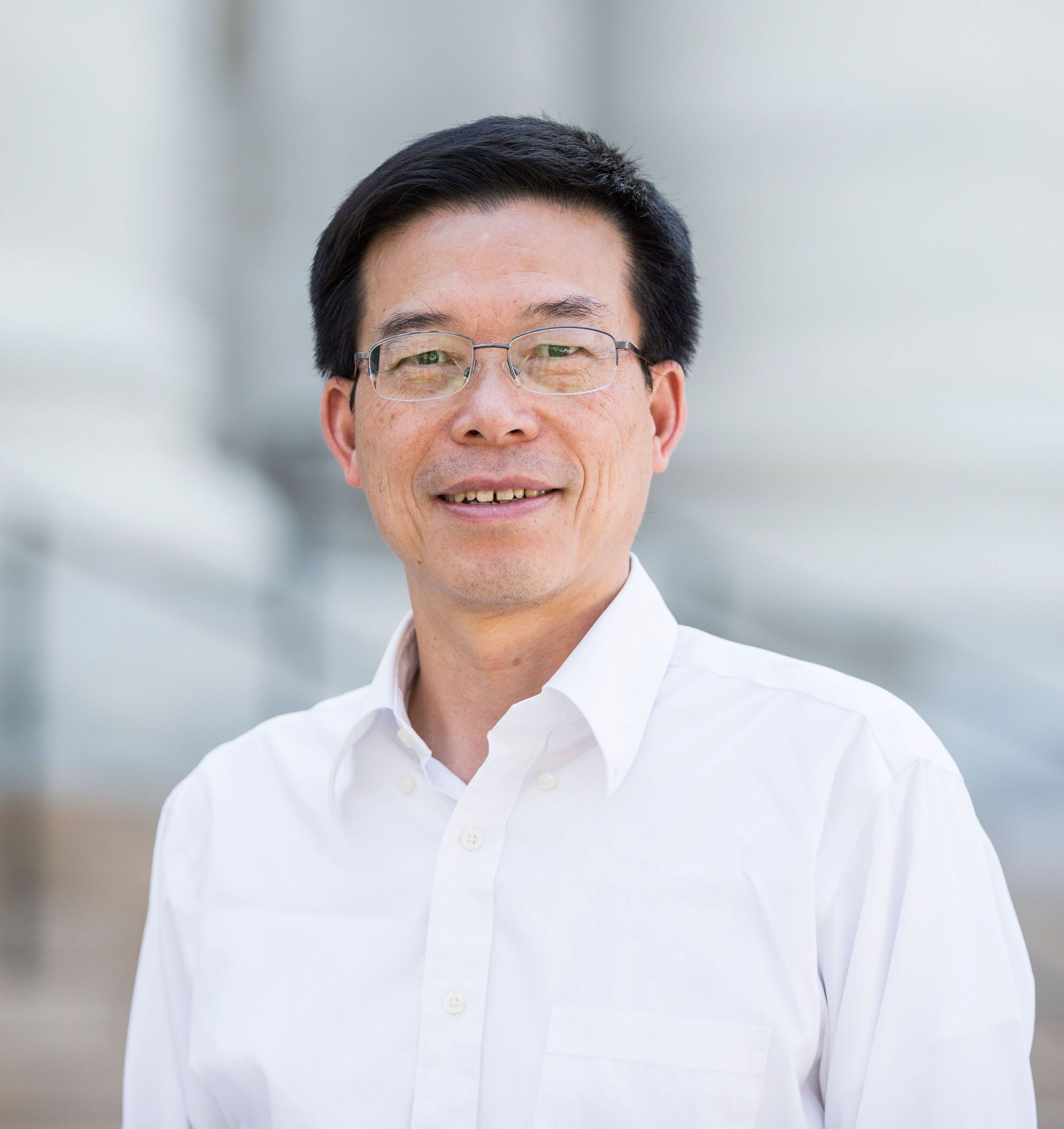
- Born: Zhang Yi; Chongqing, China
- Education: B.Sc. and master's degree in biophysics from China Agricultural University; Ph.D. in molecular biophysics from Florida State University
- Known for: Epigenetics; Embryogenesis; Somatic cell nuclear transfer Stem cell
- Scientific career
- Workplaces: Harvard Medical School; Boston Children's Hospital; Howard Hughes Medical Institute
- Academic advisors: Danny Reinberg
- Website: www.zhanglab.tch.harvard.edu

Yi Zhang (Chinese: 张毅; pinyin: Zhāng Yì) is a Chinese-American biochemist who specializes in the fields of epigenetics, chromatin, and developmental reprogramming. He is a Fred Rosen Professor of Pediatrics and professor of genetics at Harvard Medical School, a senior investigator of Program in Cellular and Molecular Medicine at Boston Children's Hospital, an investigator of the Howard Hughes Medical Institute, a member of National Academy of Medicine, and a member of National Academy of Science. He is also an associate member of the Harvard Stem Cell Institute, as well as the Broad Institute of MIT and Harvard. He is best known for his discovery of several classes of epigenetic enzymes and the identification of epigenetic barriers of SCNT cloning.

== Education ==
Zhang received his B.Sc. and master's degrees in biophysics from China Agricultural University in 1984 and 1987, respectively. He then received his Ph.D. in molecular biophysics from Florida State University in 1995. From 1995 to 1999, He did his postdoctoral training in the lab of Danny Reinberg at the Howard Hughes Medical Institute, Robert Wood Johnson Medical School of the University of Medicine and Dentistry of New Jersey.

== Career and research ==
=== Appointments ===
- 2012–present Fred Rosen Professor, Department of Genetics and Pediatrics, Harvard Medical School & Boston Children's Hospital
- 2005–present Investigator, Howard Hughes Medical Institute
- 2007–2013 Founder and scientific advisor of Epizyme, Cambridge, MA
- 1999–2012 Assistant Professor to Kenan Distinguished Professor, Dept. of Biochemistry & Biophysics, University of North Carolina at Chapel Hill

=== Research ===
Zhang has published more than 200 highly influential papers. These studies have been cited over 100,000 times (H-index 131), making him one of the top 10 authors of high impact papers in the fields of molecular biology and genetics (ScienceWatch 2008), and one of the "most influential scientific minds" (ScienceWatch 2014). He was also a Founder of Epizyme, and NewStem (Natick, MA). His current efforts are focused on the molecular mechanism of embryonic development & reprogramming, brain reward-related learning & memory, pancreatic cancer.

Zhang has made several landmark discoveries in the fields of epigenetics, chromatin and developmental reprogramming.

1. Zhang was the first to systematically identify and characterize six histone methyltransferases, including the H4R3 methyltransferase PRMT1, the H3K79 methyltransferase Dot1L, and the H3K27me3 methyltransferase EZH2/PRC2. He went on to demonstrate the function of H3K27me3 methylation in X chromosome inactivation, genomic imprinting, and non-coding RNA regulation. He was also the first to uncover PRC1 as an E3 ligase mediating H2A ubiquitylation. By discovering two enzymatic activities of two PcG protein complexes, Zhang has contributed significantly to our current understanding of the PcG silencing mechanism.
2. Zhang was the first to show JmjC domain is a signature motif for histone demethylases. He not only worked out the demethylation mechanism, but also demonstrated that JmjC demethylases can demethylate trimethyl state. Zhang went on to show the diverse function of histone demethylases in spermatogenesis, metabolism, cancer, iPSC generation, and somatic cell nuclear transfer reprogramming. The last finding overcomes a major barrier in SCNT cloning, contributing to the success of the first primate cloning by a team of Chinese scientists
3. Zhang not only discovered 5-formylcytosine (5fC), and 5-carboxylcytosine (5caC) in mammalian genomic DNA, but also elucidated the DNA demethylation mechanism by demonstrating that Tet proteins can sequentially oxidize 5-methylcytosine (5mC) to 5-hydroxymethylcytosine (5hmC), 5fC, and 5caC in a cyclic manner in mouse embryonic stem cells. He continued to reveal the function of Tet proteins in zygotic DNA demethylation, germ cell development, and genomic imprinting erasure
4. Zhang contributed to the understanding of the molecular events during mammalian embryogenesis by uncovering an important function of de novo nucleosome assembly in nuclear pore complex formation, identifying key factors for zygotic genome activation, revealing a new mechanism of genomic imprinting and imprinted X-inactivation, as well as the role of this new imprinting mechanism in SCNT cloning

== Honors and recognition ==
- 2026 Elected to the National Academy of Science
- 2023 Elected to the National Academy of Medicine
- 2012 Fellow, American Association for the Advancement of Science
- 2012 Fred Rosen chair, Harvard Medical School & Boston Children's Hospital
- 2009 Senior Investigator Award, Chinese Biological Investigators Society
- 2009 Kenan Distinguished Professorship, University of North Carolina-Chapel Hill
- 2008 The Battle Distinguished Cancer Research Award, University of North Carolina-Chapel Hill
- 2008 Top 10 authors of high-impact papers by ScienceWatch
- 2005 Investigator, Howard Hughes Medical Institute
- 2004 Hettleman Prize for Artistic and Scholarly Achievement, University of North Carolina-Chapel Hill
- 2000 V. Scholar Award, V Foundation for Cancer Research
