= United States v. Armstrong =

- Supreme Court of the United States

Argued February 26, 1996 Decided May 13, 1996
- Full case name: United States v. Armstrong et al.
- Citations: 517 U.S. 456 (more) 116 S. Ct. 1480; 134 L. Ed. 2d 687

Case history
- Prior: 21 F.3d 1431 (9th Cir. 1994); Rehearing en banc granted, 31 F.3d 872 (9th Cir. 1994); On rehearing, 48 F.3d 1508 (9th Cir. 1995); Cert. granted, 516 U.S. 942 (1995)

Holding
- The burden of proof for selective prosecution rests with the defendant, who must show the government declined to prosecute similarly situated suspects of other races.

Court membership
- Chief Justice William Rehnquist Associate Justices John P. Stevens · Sandra Day O'Connor; Antonin Scalia · Anthony Kennedy; David Souter · Clarence Thomas; Ruth Bader Ginsburg · Stephen Breyer

Case opinions
- Majority: Rehnquist, joined by O'Connor, Scalia, Kennedy, Souter, Thomas, Ginsburg; Breyer (in part)
- Concurrence: Souter
- Concurrence: Ginsburg
- Concurrence: Breyer (in part and in judgment)
- Dissent: Stevens

Laws applied
- U.S. Const. amend. V

United States v. Armstrong, 517 U.S. 456 (1996), was a case heard by the Supreme Court of the United States in which the court held that the burden of proof for selective prosecution rests with the defendant, who must show the government declined to prosecute similarly situated suspects of other races.

== Syllabus ==
Respondents filed a motion to dismiss their indictment for "crack" cocaine and other federal charges, alleging they were selected for prosecution based on their race. The motion was granted by the District Court and affirmed by the Ninth Circuit en banc, which ruled the proof requirements do not compel the defendant to demonstrate the Government has failed to prosecute others who are similarly situated.

The Supreme Court held that:

1. Federal Rule of Criminal Procedure 16, which governs discovery in criminal cases, exempts the work product of Government attorneys and agents made in connection with the case's investigation.
2. Under the equal protection component of the Due Process Clause of the Fifth Amendment, the decision whether to prosecute may not be based on an arbitrary classification such as race or religion. Thus a defendant must produce credible evidence that similarly situated defendants of other races could have been prosecuted, but were not, in order to be entitled to discovery.

The Supreme Court reversed and remanded, 8–1. Chief Justice William Rehnquist wrote the opinion of the court, and was joined by Justices Sandra Day O'Connor, Antonin Scalia, Anthony Kennedy, David Souter, Clarence Thomas, and Ruth Bader Ginsburg. Justice Stephen Breyer joined the majority opinion in part and also wrote a separate concurring opinion. Justice John P. Stevens wrote the dissenting opinion.

== Subsequent developments ==
Justice Antonin Scalia quoted United States v. Armstrong to hold in Reno v. American-Arab Anti-Discrimination Committee that an "alien unlawfully in this country has no constitutional right to assert selective enforcement as a defense against his deportation" because subjecting the prosecutor's motives and decision making to outside inquiry would "chill law enforcement":

What will be involved in deportation cases is not merely the disclosure of normal domestic law enforcement priorities and techniques, but often the disclosure of foreign-policy objectives and (as in this case) foreign-intelligence products and techniques. The Executive should not have to disclose its "real" reasons for deeming nationals of a particular country a special threat―or indeed for simply wishing to antagonize a particular foreign country by focusing on that country's nationals.

There is ongoing uncertainty about the precedential value of this portion of Reno which most legal experts believe should be limited to its facts. In 2018, the reliance of Immigration and Customs Enforcement (ICE) on this part of Reno v. ADC was challenged in Ragbir v. Homon. In Ragbir's case ICE took a broad view that Reno v. ADC applied to protected first amendment activity.
