= Markan =

Marcan may refer to:

- Marcan Priority, a Biblical hypothesis
- Margown, a city in Iran
