= Markman v. Westview Instruments, Inc. =

- Supreme Court of the United States

Argued January 8, 1996 Decided April 23, 1996
- Full case name: Herbert Markman and Positek, Incorporated, Petitioners v. Westview Instruments, Incorporated and Althon Enterprises, Incorporated
- Citations: 517 U.S. 370 (more) 116 S. Ct. 1384; 134 L. Ed. 2d 577; 1996 U.S. LEXIS 2804; 64 U.S.L.W. 4263; 38 U.S.P.Q.2d (BNA) 1461; 96 Cal. Daily Op. Service 2788; 96 Daily Journal DAR 4642; 9 Fla. L. Weekly Fed. S 540

Case history
- Prior: Directed verdict for defendant, 772 F. Supp. 1535 (E.D. Pa. 1991); affirmed, 52 F.3d 967 (Fed. Cir. 1995); cert. granted, 515 U.S. 1192 (1995).
- Subsequent: None

Holding
- Interpretation of patent claim terms is a matter of law for the court to decide.

Court membership
- Chief Justice William Rehnquist Associate Justices John P. Stevens · Sandra Day O'Connor; Antonin Scalia · Anthony Kennedy; David Souter · Clarence Thomas; Ruth Bader Ginsburg · Stephen Breyer

Case opinion
- Majority: Souter, joined by unanimous

Laws applied
- U.S. Const. amend. VII

Markman v. Westview Instruments, Inc., 517 U.S. 370 (1996), is a United States Supreme Court case on whether the interpretation of patent claims is a matter of law or a question of fact. An issue designated as a matter of law is resolved by the judge, and an issue construed as a question of fact is determined by the jury.

== Background ==
Herbert Markman patented a system to track clothes through the dry cleaning process using barcode to generate receipts and track inventory.

The 7th Amendment guarantees the right to a jury trial in patent infringement cases. The 7th Amendment preserves the right to a jury trial as it existed in 1791. There is no dispute that infringement cases today must be tried by a jury as their predecessors were in 1791. However, the court held that the construction of the patent, including the terms of art within its claim, is exclusively within the court's province.

In general, the effectiveness of a particular patent depends on its potential to block competitors. The key for a patent holder is getting the proper definition of words used in the patent to allow blocking of the particular troublesome competitive product. Before this decision, juries were responsible for deciding the meaning of the words used in patent claims. Opposing results in cases with similar facts were common, and a perception arose that the outcome of such trials was somewhat arbitrary. In Markman, the Court held that judges, not juries, would evaluate and decide the meaning of the words used in patent claims. Judges were to look at four sources for definitions, in order of priority:

1. the written description accompanying the patent claims is most relevant;
2. the documentation of the history of the patent as it went through the application;
3. standard dictionaries of English;
4. finally, if all else fails, expert testimony from experts "skilled in the art" at issue.

This case has had a significant impact on the patent litigation process in the United States. Many jurisdictions now hold Markman hearings to construe patent claims before the actual trial. Patent infringement suits now often settle after this stage of the litigation process.

== Supreme Court decision ==
In a unanimous ruling written by Justice David Souter, the court affirmed the judgment of the circuit court, holding that:

The construction of a patent, including terms of art within its claim, is exclusively within the province of the court.

== Law firms involved ==
Markman was represented in the original trial by the law firm of Duane Morris, and by the law firm of Eckert Seamans on appeal. Defendants were represented by the law firm of Gollatz, Griffin, Ewing & McCarthy (now Flaster Greenberg) on appeal.

== See also ==
- List of United States Supreme Court cases, volume 517
- Markman hearing
