= Markman hearing =

Legal proceeding under US patent law

A Markman hearing is a judicial proceeding held in the United States District Court for claims dealing with patent infringement. During a Markman hearing a judge is responsible for interpreting the meaning of words and phrases in a patent, ultimately providing what is known as "claim construction." This is also known as claim interpretation. A Markman hearing usually defines the scope of the patent either for or against the inventor. However, effects of the Markman hearing, include (1) what evidence to consider, (2) de novo review on appeal, (3) depletion of judicial resources, and (4) the timing of a Markman hearing.

== Inception ==
In the 1996 case of Markman v. Westview Instruments, Inc., the Supreme Court of the United States held that claim interpretation was a matter of law rather than a question of fact for the jury. Ordinarily, the 7th Amendment provides, in certain circumstances, an individual's right to a jury trial. However, courts have determined that in some instances judges are better equipped to address certain issues, like patent claim interpretation, as opposed to juries. Specifically, the court in Markman determined that patents are like contracts, and contracts have been reviewed by the court in history's past. Therefore, it is best suited for courts to interpret patent language.

== Effects and Clarifications ==
=== Intrinsic v. Extrinsic Evidence ===
One of the main areas which needed clarification after the creation of Markman hearings was the use of evidence during claim construction. In analyzing patent language, the court can turn to difference sources of information for guidance. These sources were eventually split into intrinsic evidence and extrinsic evidence.

Intrinsic evidence includes (1) the patent itself, (2) the patent specification, and (3) patent history. The words themselves, is the most important source of evidence and defines the scope of the patent. The court must analyze the words in their ordinary meaning and "in light of the specifics . . . [of] the invention." Put differently, the court must look at the language's plain meaning to determine the intended scope of protection of the patent at issue.

Next, the court may consider patent specification during claim construction. According to 35 U.S.C. § 112, a specification contains "a written description of the invention, and of the manner and process of making and using it, in such full, clear, concise, and exact terms as to enable any person skilled in the art to which it pertains, or with which it is most nearly connected, to make and use the same, and shall set forth the best mode contemplated by the inventor or joint inventor of carrying out the invention." The specification, known as the dictionary of a patent, must be looked at with the patent to determine whether the patentee used terms which are inconsistent with ordinary patent language.

Lastly, the court may consider patent history in its claim construction. Patent history provides information regarding all proceedings prior to patent approval, including applicant representations to the Patent and Trademark Office. Patent history may provide the court with a more in-depth understanding as to the intended scope of the claim.

Extrinsic evidence can include sources, such as expert testimony. However, there has been debate in the Federal Circuit as to whether extrinsic evidence can be used alongside intrinsic when evaluating claims. According to the court in Vitronics Corp., extrinsic evidence shall not be used when intrinsic evidence is sufficient to resolve ambiguous claims. Yet, three years later, the same court in Pitney Bowes, Inc., determined that judges can turn to extrinsic evidence for guidance even in circumstances where the intrinsic evidence is adequate on its own.

In 2015, the Supreme Court clarified that in claim construction, only intrinsic evidence should be used, and if after such review the claim terms are still ambiguous, then extrinsic evidence can be used.

=== De Novo Appellate Review ===
Another effect of Markman hearings is the de novo review of claim interpretation. After the Supreme Court's decision in Markman v. Westview Instruments, Inc., the Federal Circuit was faced with determining the proper standard of review of claim construction issues on appeal. In Cybor Corp. v. FAS Techs. Inc., the Federal Circuit affirmed that the standard of review would be de novo. De novo is defined as an appellate court reviewing a lower court's decision with without regard to the lower court's decision. In a case concerning claim interpretation, the higher court will not consider the lower court's decision in interpreting a claim.

This standard of review led to studies regarding the reversal rate of trial court decisions. Prior to Markman, studies showed that the reversal rate for patent claim construction was approximately 20.8%. After the court's decision in Cybor, the reversal rate increased to 32%. It has been argued that the reason for such a high reversal rate was the standard of review, which ultimately resulted in a lack of uniformity and consistency in decisions.

In 2015, the Supreme Court addressed the de novo review standard. In Teva Pharms. USA, Inc. v. Sandoz, Inc., the Supreme Court reversed their decision in Cybor and held that the appellate court must defer to factual findings of the lower court unless the findings were "clearly erroneous." Specifically, the Court stated the following standard was to be used by lower courts: only intrinsic evidence should be used, and if after such review the claim terms are still ambiguous, then extrinsic evidence can be used. If there is a dispute over the underlying facts, the court may make "[secondary] factual findings as to the credibility of the extrinsic evidence." Appellate court's will review the fact finding for "clear error" on appeal.

=== Markman Hearing Timing ===
When Markman hearings occur is up to the trial court. The Federal Circuit has not provided clear guidance to the lower courts as to when a hearing should occur, but rather has implied preferences as to when it should take place. Times at which a Markman hearing may take place includes during pre-discovery, at summary judgment, and at trial, but before jury instructions.

Conducting a Markman hearing during the pre-discovery phase includes benefits, such as limiting litigation time, early settlements, decreasing litigation costs, and centralizing discovery around the court's interpretation of the patent claim. Disadvantages include short discovery phases and court's interpreting claim language with little information. Ultimately, early on claim construction by the court can be later changed as more information becomes available, which makes early on Markman hearings impractical.

Most courts conduct Markman hearings at summary judgment prior to trial. Conducting a Markman hearing at this stage of litigation includes benefits, such as identifying which claims are important to the claim at issue and allowing the court to use discovery to interpret the claim. However, an issue with conducting a hearing at this phase of litigation was the likelihood of reversal on appeal. Prior to 2015, should a court dismiss a case at summary judgment, the claim construction was subject to de novo review. After 2015, appeals are subject to the hybrid "clear error" standard. However, studies are still too premature to determine whether reversal rates will remain as high as they were under the de novo review standard.

The latest a Markman hearing can occur is at or after a trial, prior to jury instruction. Advantages include, no claim interpretation without important background information, judges have a better understanding of the technology at issue, and the judge heard all important evidence. Disadvantages include delay in jury decisions, juries hearing evidence without the construction of the court, and arguments as to different claim interpretations, which may include unnecessary litigation.

== Impact ==
A major consequence of Markman hearings is the split of patent claims into a Markman hearing itself and a trial. First, a separate hearing has allowed for experts to be produced on two occasions. Second, courts that interpret claims early on in the pre-discovery phase are looking at patent language without the content needed to properly assess the claim. These factors not only increase litigation costs, require additional judicial time, and potentially lengthen litigation, but also increase the likelihood of reversal on appeal should the court conduct claim construction without proper knowledge.
