= List of hospitals in China =

As of 2011, there were 21,638 hospitals in China, forming an important part of the country's healthcare system. The most notable hospitals are listed below for each province of China.

== Beijing ==
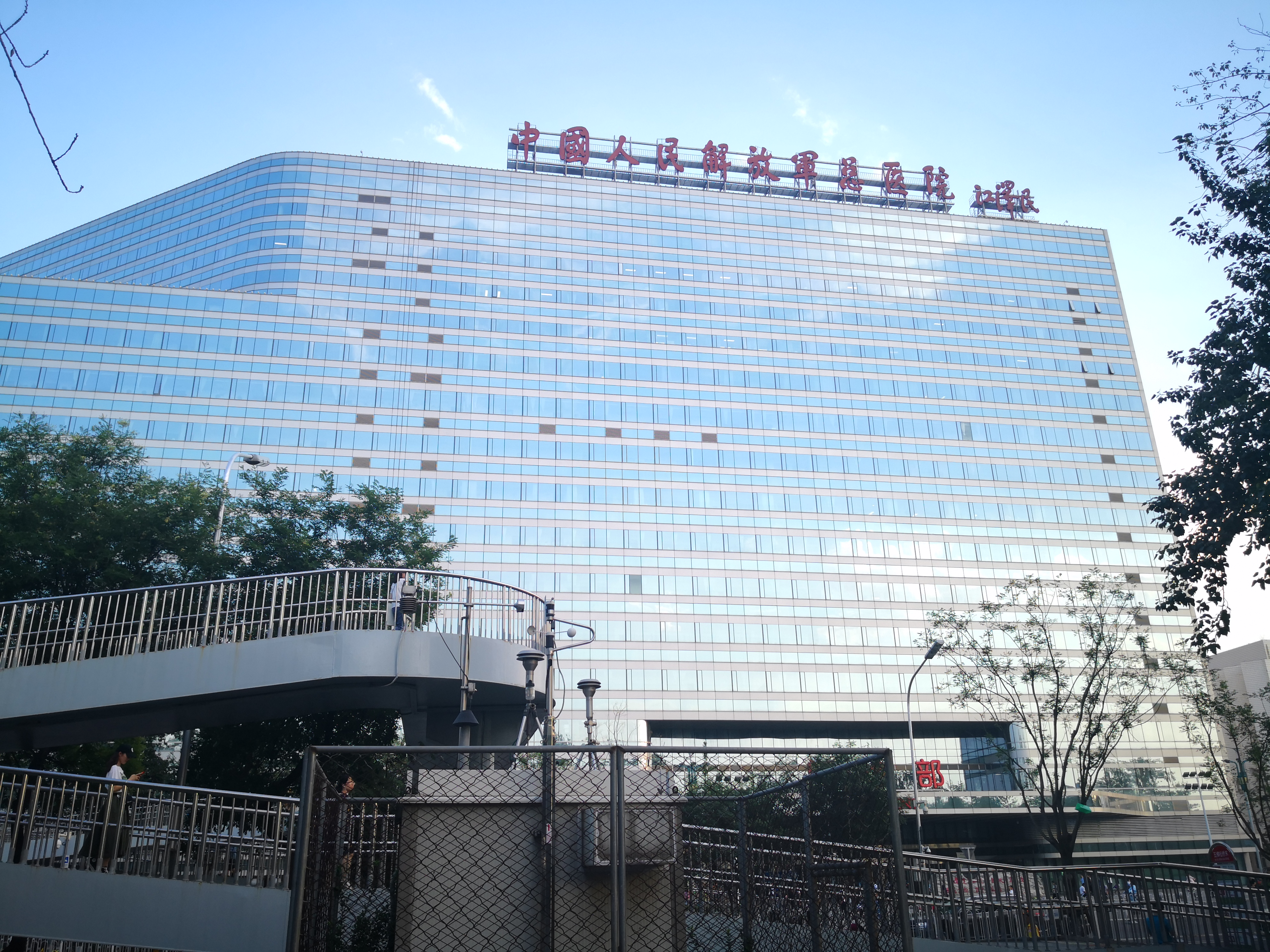
301 Hospital

- 301 Hospital
- 302 Hospital
- 307 Hospital
- Aerospace Center Hospital
- Amcare Women and Children Hospital
- Arrail Dental Clinic
- APMG Puhua International Hospitals – Shuangjing
- APMG Puhua International Hospitals – Temple of Heaven
- Beijing 21st Century Hospital
- Beijing An-ding Hospital
- Beijing Anzhen Hospital
- Beijing Buwai Hospital
- Beijing Chaoyang Hospital (Capital Medical University)
- Beijing Chaoyang An-yuan Hospital of Traditional Chinese Medicine
- Beijing Chaoyang Dongba Hospital
- Beijing Chaoyang Guanzhuang Hospital
- Beijing Chaoyang Hospital of Traditional Chinese Medicine
- Beijing Chaoyang Huagonglu Hospital
- Beijing Chaoyang Huizhong Hospital
- Beijing Chaoyang Jingsong Hospital
- Beijing Chaoyang No. 2 Hospital
- Beijing Chaoyang Wali Hospital
- Beijing Chaoyang Women and Children's Healthcare Center
- Beijing Chaoyang Xiaohongmeng Hospital
- Beijing Charity Hospital
- Beijing Children's Hospital
- Beijing Chi Kang Hospital
- Beijing Chongwen Children's Hospital
- Beijing Chongwen Guangming Hospital
- Beijing Chongwen Hospital of Traditional Chinese Medicine
- Beijing Chongwen Mouchun Hospital
- Beijing Chongwen No. 1 People's Hospital
- Beijing Chongwen Stomatological Hospital
- Beijing Chongwen Zhengda Hospital
- Beijing Communication Hospital of the Ministry of Communication
- Beijing Construction Workers Hospital
- Beijing Ditan Hospital
- Beijing Erlong Road Hospital
- Beijing Friendship Hospital
- Beijing Fulong Hospital
- Beijing Fuxing Hospital
- Beijing Geriatric Hospital
- Beijing Gulou Hospital of Traditional Chinese Medicine
- Beijing Guotai Hospital
- Beijing Hepingli Hospital
- Beijing Hospital
- Beijing Stomatological Hospital|Beijing Hospital for Stomatology
- Beijing Hospital of Traditional Chinese Medicine
- Beijing Huguoshi Hospital of Traditional Chinese Medicine
- Beijing Huiming Hospital
- Beijing Intech Eye Hospital
- Beijing Jingcheng Dermatopathy Hospital
- Beijing Jishuitan Hospital
- Beijing Massage Hospital
- Beijing Maternity Hospital
- Beijing New Century International Hospital for Children
- Beijing No. 1 Hospital affiliated to Beijing Medical University
- Beijing No. 2 Hospital
- Beijing No. 6 Hospital
- Beijing Police Hospital
- Beijing Post Hospital
- Beijing Puren Hospital
- Beijing Qing Gong Hospital
- Beijing Royal Integrative Medicine Hospital, Chanping District
- Beijing Shunyi Hospital
- Beijing Tiantan Hospital
- Beijing Tibet Hospital
- Beijing Tongren Hospital
- Beijing United Family Hospital and Clinics
- Beijing University International Hospital
- Beijing Wan Jie Hospital
- Beijing Xuanwu Baizhifan Hospital
- Beijing Xuanwu Chunshu Hospital
- Beijing Xuanwu Dazhalan Hospital
- Beijing Xuanwu Guangwai Hospital
- Beijing Xuanwu Guangnei Hospital
- Beijing Xuanwu Hospital of Traditional Chinese Medicine
- Beijing Xuanwu Taoranting Hospital
- Beijing Xuanwu Tianqiao Hospital
- Bethune International Peace Hospital
- Cancer Hospital, Chinese Academy of Medical Sciences
- Changyang Hospital
- China Rehabilitation Research Center
- CMU Beijing Fuxing Hospital (Capital Medical University)
- China-Japan Friendship Hospital
- DongFang Hospital
- East Area Hospital of Beijing Chaoyang Red Cross
- Eastern Hospital of Beijing – Eastern Hospital of Beijing Traditional Chinese Medical University
- Fuwai Hospital
- General Hospital of Chinese People's Armed Police Forces
- General Hospital of the Chinese People's Liberation Army
- Guang'anmen Hospital
- Haidian Changquing Hospital of Beijing
- Hospital for Skin Diseases, CAMS
- Jihua Hospital
- OASIS International Hospital
- Orient Hospital
- Peking Union Medical College Hospital
- Peking University First Hospital
- Peking University Hospital of Stomatology
- Peking University People's Hospital
- PKU 3rd People's Hospital
- PKU 6th Hospital (Mental Care)
- PKU Oral Care Hospital
- Plastic Surgery Hospital, Chinese Academy of Medical Sciences
- Puhua International Hospital and Clinics
- Red Cross Chaoyang Hospital affiliated to Capital Medical University
- Sanfine International Hospital
- Sekwa Eye Hospital, Beijing SEH
- Shuguang Hospital of Beijing Chaoyang Red Cross
- SK Hospital
- Xinhua Hospital of Beijing Red Cross
- Xuanwu Hospital of Capital Medical University
- Xiaotangshan Hospital
- Xiyuan Hospital

== Chongqing ==
- Southwest Hospital of AMU
- First Affiliated Hospital of Chongqing Medical University
- Children's Hospital of Chongqing Medical University

== Fujian ==
- First Affiliated Hospital of Fujian Medical University

== Gansu ==
There are over 300 hospitals in Gansu Province. The following are some of the notable hospitals in Gansu Province:

- First People's Hospital of Lanzhou, Lanzhou
- Second People's Hospital of Gansu (see Borden Memorial Hospital, predecessor)
- Second People's Hospital of Lanzhou, Lanzhou
- Third People's Hospital of Gansu
- Baiyin First People's Hospital
- Chinese People's Liberation Hospital Number 1
- Dunhuang Hospital, Dunhuag
- Gansu Province Hospital of Traditional Chinese Medicine
- Gansu Tumor Hospital
- General Military Hospital
- Jiuquan People's Hospital, Jiuquan
- Lanzhou University First Hospital, Lanzhou
- Lanzhou University Second Hospital, Lanzhou
- Lanzhou People's Hospital Number 3, Lanzhou
- Lanzhou Heavy Ion Cancer Treatment Center, Lanzhou (joint venture by Sheng De Group, the city government and Chinese Academy of Sciences, Lanzhou Branch, Institution of Modern Physics)
- Lanzhou Military Hospital, Lanzhou
- People's Hospital of Gansu
- Wuwei People's Hospital, Wuwei
- Yumen Number 1 People's Hospital, Yumen

== Guangdong ==
- Clifford Hospital
- First Affiliated Hospital of Guangzhou Medical University
- First Affiliated Hospital of Sun Yat-sen University
- Guangdong General Hospital
- Guangdong Provincial Hospital of Chinese Medicine
- Guangzhou Women and Children's Medical Center
- Nanfang Hospital
- Peking University Shenzhen Hospital
- Shenzhen People's Hospital
- Sun Yat-sen Memorial Hospital

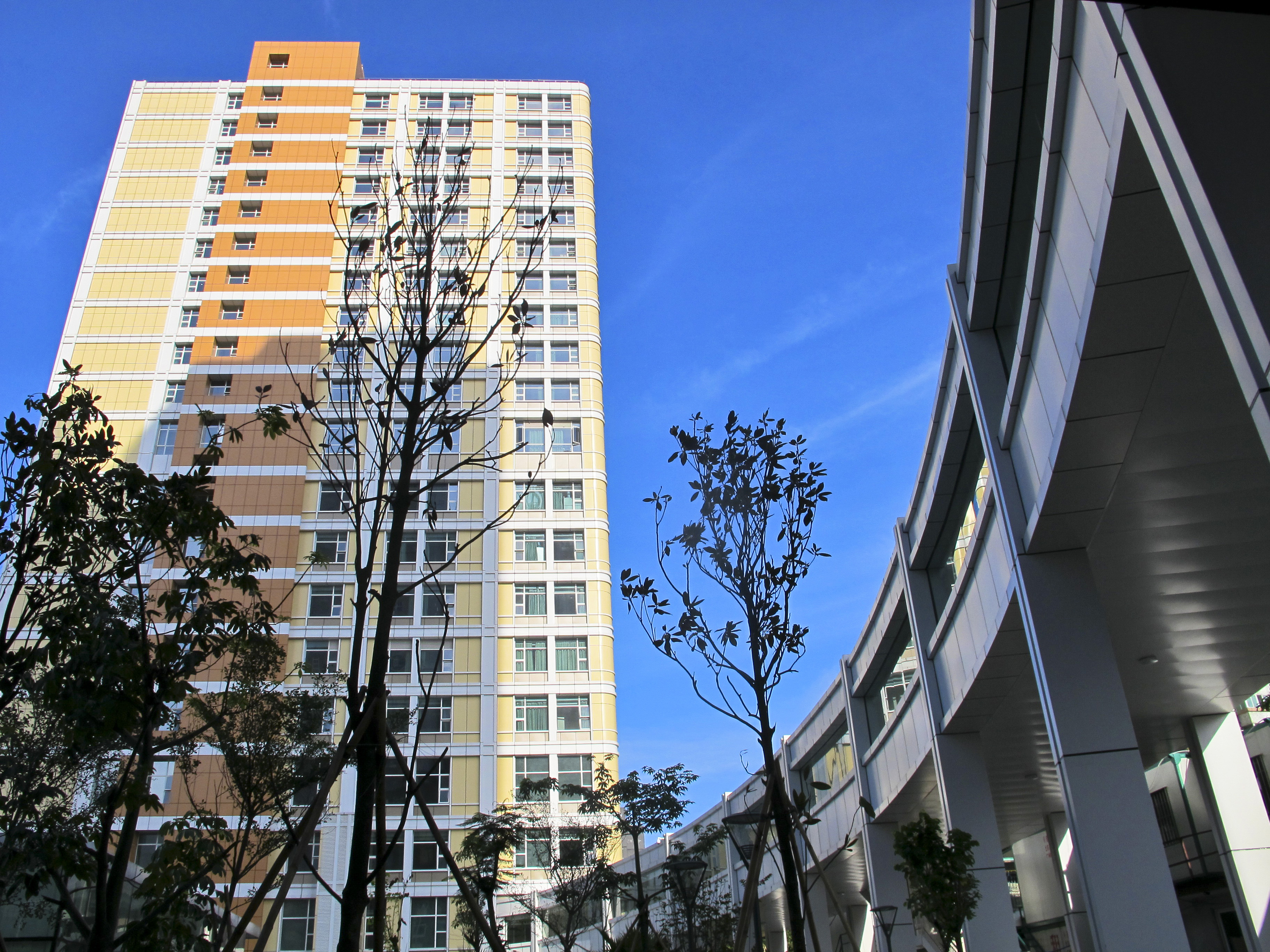
Sun Yat-sen University Cancer Center

- Sun Yat-sen University Cancer Center
- Third Affiliated Hospital of Sun Yat-sen University
- Xinhui People's Hospital
- Zhongshan Ophthalmic Center
- Zhujiang Hospital

== Guangxi ==
- People's Hospital of Guangxi Zhuang Autonomous Region

== Hainan ==
- Haikou City People's Hospital

== Henan ==
- First Affiliated Hospital of Zhengzhou University
- Henan Provincial People's Hospital
- First Affiliated Hospital of Henan University of Chinese Medicine

== Hubei ==
- Wuhan Jianghan Maternity and Child Health Care Center
- Zhongnan Hospital of Wuhan University
- Wuhan Central Hospital
- Renmin Hospital of Wuhan University
- Wuhan No.1 Hospital
- Western and Traditional Chinese Medicine Combined Hospital of Wuhan Xinzhou District
- Wuhan Jiangxia District Traditional Chinese & Western Medicine Hospital
- Hanxi Branch of Wuhan Western and Traditional Chinese Medicine Combined Hospital
- Wuhan Hospital of Combined West and Traditional Chinese Medicine
- Wuhan University Stomatological Hospital
- Wuhan Shunyuan Hospital of Traditional Chinese Medicine
- Wuhan Brain Hospital
- Wuhan Textile University Hospital
- Wuhan Central Hospital Huaqiao Out-patient Department
- Wuhan University Zhongnan Hospital Emergency Medical Service
- Wuhan Jingyue Hospital
- Wuhan Jinyintan Hospital, Jinyintan Avenue/ Yintan Road
- Wuhan Tuberculosis Hospital
- Wuhan Guanggu Central Hospital
- Wuhan Tongji Hospital
- Wuhan Union Hospital
- Huoshenshan Hospital (Construction began 23 January 2020; scheduled operational by 3 February)
- Leishenshan Hospital (Construction began 25 January 2020; scheduled operational by 5 February)
- Xinhua Hospital (Hubei), a hospital located in Hankou, Wuhan, which is a teaching hospital of Tongji Medical College, Huazhong University of Science and Technology

== Hunan ==
- Xiangya Hospital of Central South University
- The Second Xiangya Hospital of Central South University
- The Third Xiangya Hospital of Central South University

== Jiangsu ==
- Zhongda Hospital, Southeast University
- First Affiliated Hospital of Nanjing Medical University
- Hospital for Skin Diseases, CAMS
- Jiangsu Provincial People's Hospital
- Jiangsu Provincial Stomatology Hospital
- Jiangsu Provincial Hospital of Chinese Medicine
- Nanjing Drum Tower Hospital
- Nanjing Brain Hospital
- Nanjing General Hospital of Nanjing Military Command
- Nanjing General Military Hospital
- Nanjing Ophthalmology Hospital
- Nanjing Stomatology Hospital
- Nanjing Union Dental Clinic
- Skoulnong General Hospital
- SOS International Clinic
- First Affiliated Hospital of Soochow University

== Jiangxi ==
- The First Affiliated Hospital of Nanchang University

== Jilin ==
- First Hospital of Jilin University

== Liaoning ==
- First Affiliated Hospital of China Medical University
- Sheng Jing Hospital
- Sujiatun Thrombosis Hospital

== Macau SAR ==
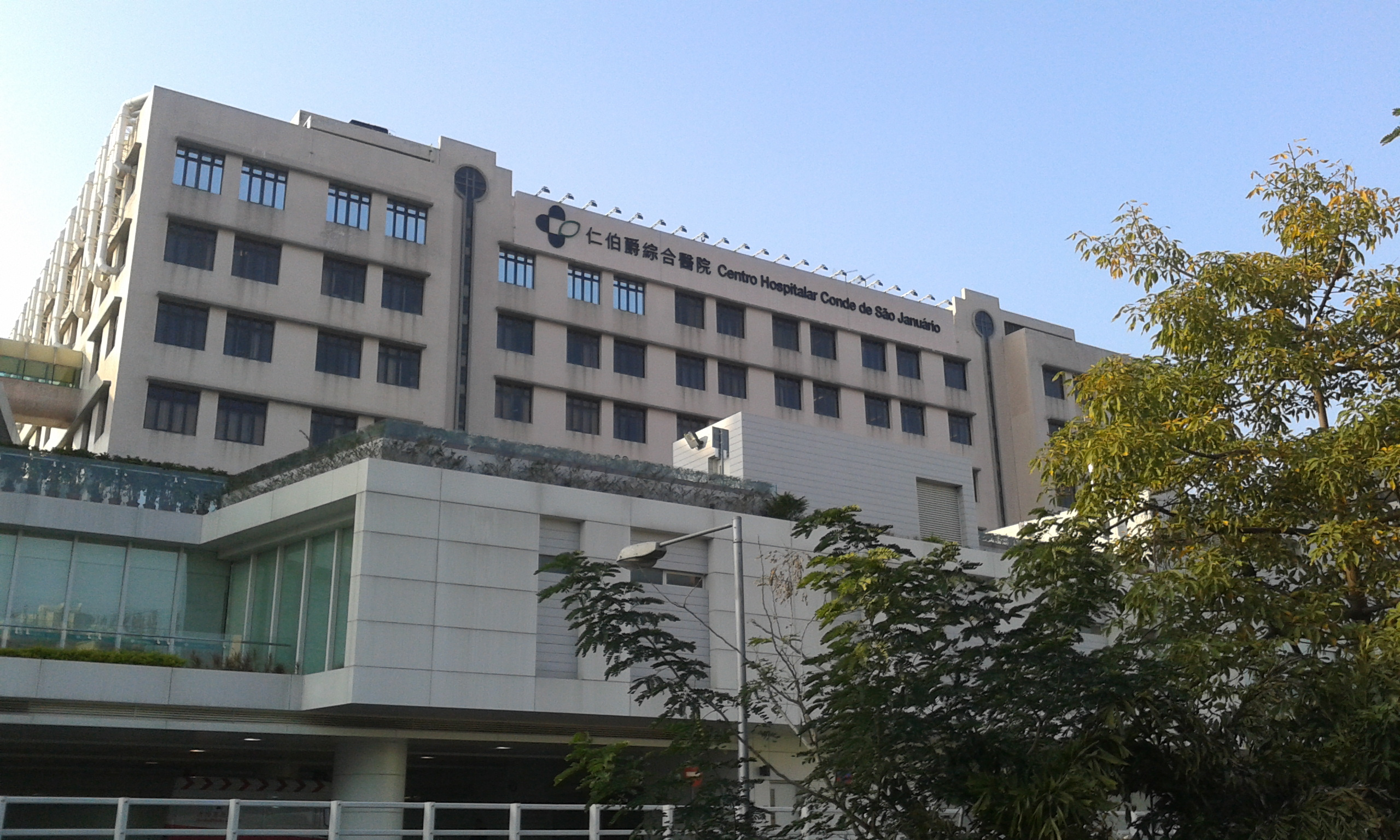
Conde S. Januário Hospital

== Shaanxi ==
- Xijing Hospital

== Shandong ==
- Qilu Hospital
- Shandong Provincial Hospital
- Affiliated Hospital of Qingdao University

== Shanghai ==
Shanghai Medical College of Fudan University

- Zhongshan Hospital
- Huashan Hospital
- Huadong Hospital
- Children's Hospital of Fudan University
- Red House Hospital (Fudan OBGYN Hospital)
- Eye and ENT Hospital of Fudan University
- Shanghai Cancer Center
- Shanghai Fifth People's Hospital

Shanghai Jiao Tong University School of Medicine

- Renji Hospital
- Ruijin Hospital
- Xinhua Hospital
- Shanghai First People's Hospital
- Shanghai Third People's Hospital
- Shanghai Sixth People's Hospital
- Shanghai Ninth People's Hospital
- Shanghai Chest Hospital
- Shanghai Mental Health Center
- Shanghai Children's Medical Center
- Shanghai Children's Hospital
- International Peace Maternity and Child Health Hospital

Shanghai Tongji University School of Medicine

- Shanghai Tenth People Hospital
- Shanghai East Hospital
- Shanghai Pulmonary Hospital
- Shanghai First Maternity and Infant Health Hospital
- Shanghai Yangpu Hospital
- Shanghai Yangzhi Rehabilitation Hospital

Shanghai University of Chinese Medicine

- Longhua Hospital
- Shuguang Hospital

Second Military Medical University

- Changhai Hospital
- Changzheng Hospital
- Eastern Hepatobiliary Surgery Hospital

Others

- Shanghai Second People's Hospital
- Shanghai Eighth People's Hospital
- St Michael Hospital

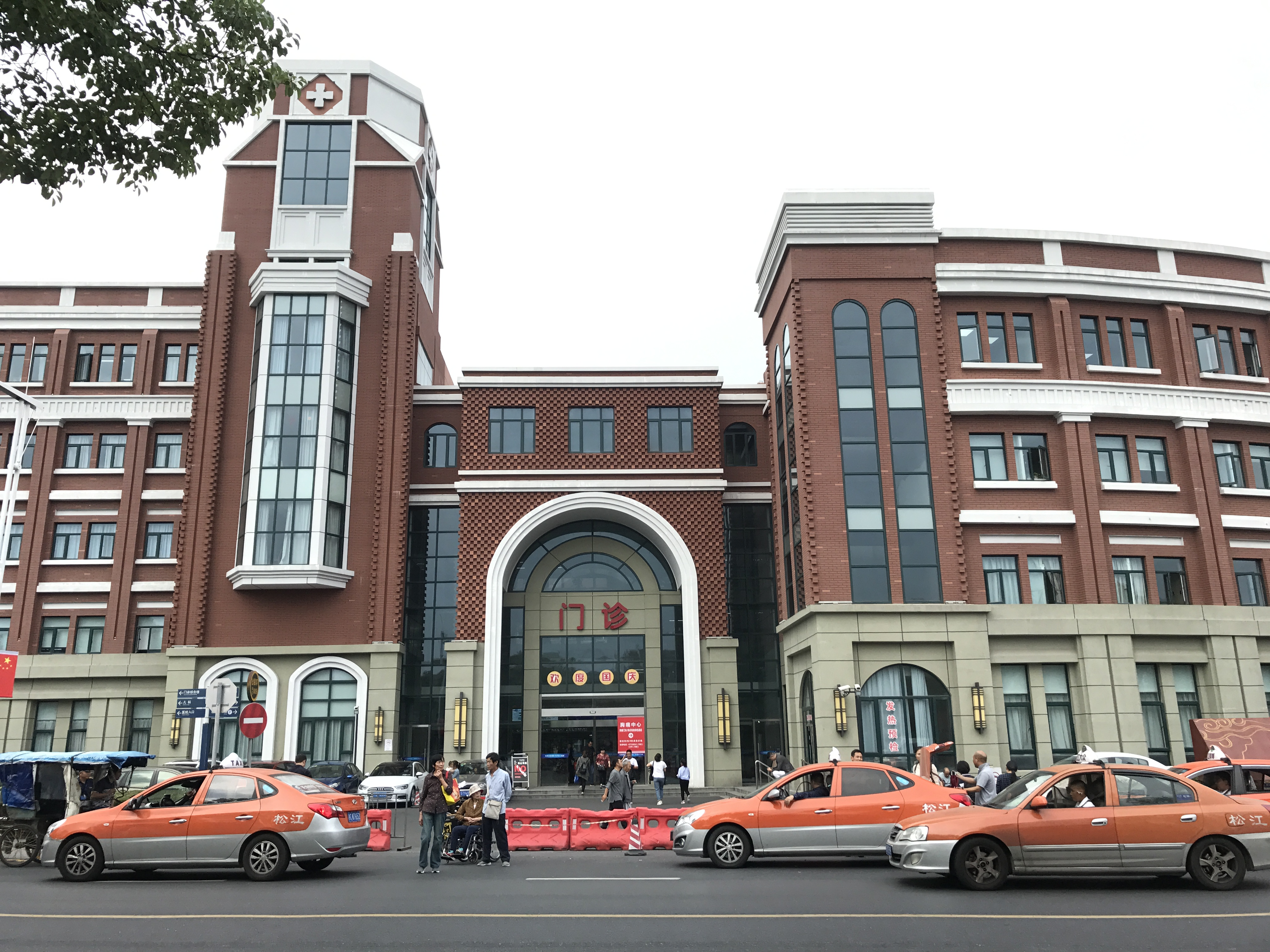
Shanghai Songjiang Central Hospital

== Sichuan ==
Sichuan University

- West China Medical Center
- West China Hospital
- West China Second University Hospital
- West China School/Hospital of Stomatology
- West China Fourth Hospital

Others

- Hospital of the Chengdu University of Traditional Chinese Medicine
- Sichuan Provincial People's Hospital

== Tianjin ==
- Baodi District People's Hospital
- Cancer Hospital of Tianjin Medical University, Tianjin Cancer Hospital
- First Affiliated Hospital of Tianjin
- Integrative Medicine Hospital of Tianjin Nankai Hospital
- Obstetrics and Gynecology Hospital of Tianjin Center
- Pulmonary Tuberculosis Hospital in Tianjin, Tianjin
- Second Affiliated Hospital of Tianjin
- Second Affiliated Hospital of Tianjin Medical University
- Sino-Singapore Eco-City Hospital of Tianjin Medical University
- TEDA Hospital
- TEDA International Cardiovascular Hospital
- Third Affiliated Hospital of Tianjin Medical University
- Tianjin Amcare Women's & Children's Hospital
- Tianjin Anding Hospital
- Tianjin Changzheng Hospital
- Tianjin Chest Hospital
- Tianjin Children's Hospital
- Tianjin Dagang Hospital
- Tianjin Eye Hospital
- Tianjin First Central Hospital
- Tianjin Haihe Hospital
- Tianjin Hospital
- Tianjin Infectious Diseases Hospital
- Tianjin Lake Hospital
- Tianjin Medical University Cancer Institute and Hospital
- Tianjin Medical University Dental Hospital
- Tianjin Medical University General Hospital
- Tianjin Medical University Chu Hsien-I Memorial Hospital
- Tianjin Mental Health Hospital
- Tianjin People's Hospital
- Tianjin People's Hospital (formerly Tianjin Second Central Hospital)
- Tianjin People's Hospital of Tianjin Riverside Hospital
- Tianjin Railway Central Hospital (formerly Tianjin Fourth Central Hospital)
- Tianjin Stomatological Hospital
- Tianjin TEDA Puhua International Hospital
- Tianjin Third Central Hospital (formerly the Hedong Hospital)
- Tianjin Traditional Chinese Medicine Hospital
- Tianjin United Family Hospital
- Tianjin University Central Hospital

== Xinjiang ==
- First Affiliated Hospital of XMU
- Second Affiliated Hospital of XMU
- Third Affiliated Hospital of XMU
- Fourth Affiliated Hospital of XMU
- Fifth Affiliated Hospital of XMU
- Sixth Affiliated Hospital of XMU
- People's Hospital of the Xinjiang Uyghur Autonomous Region

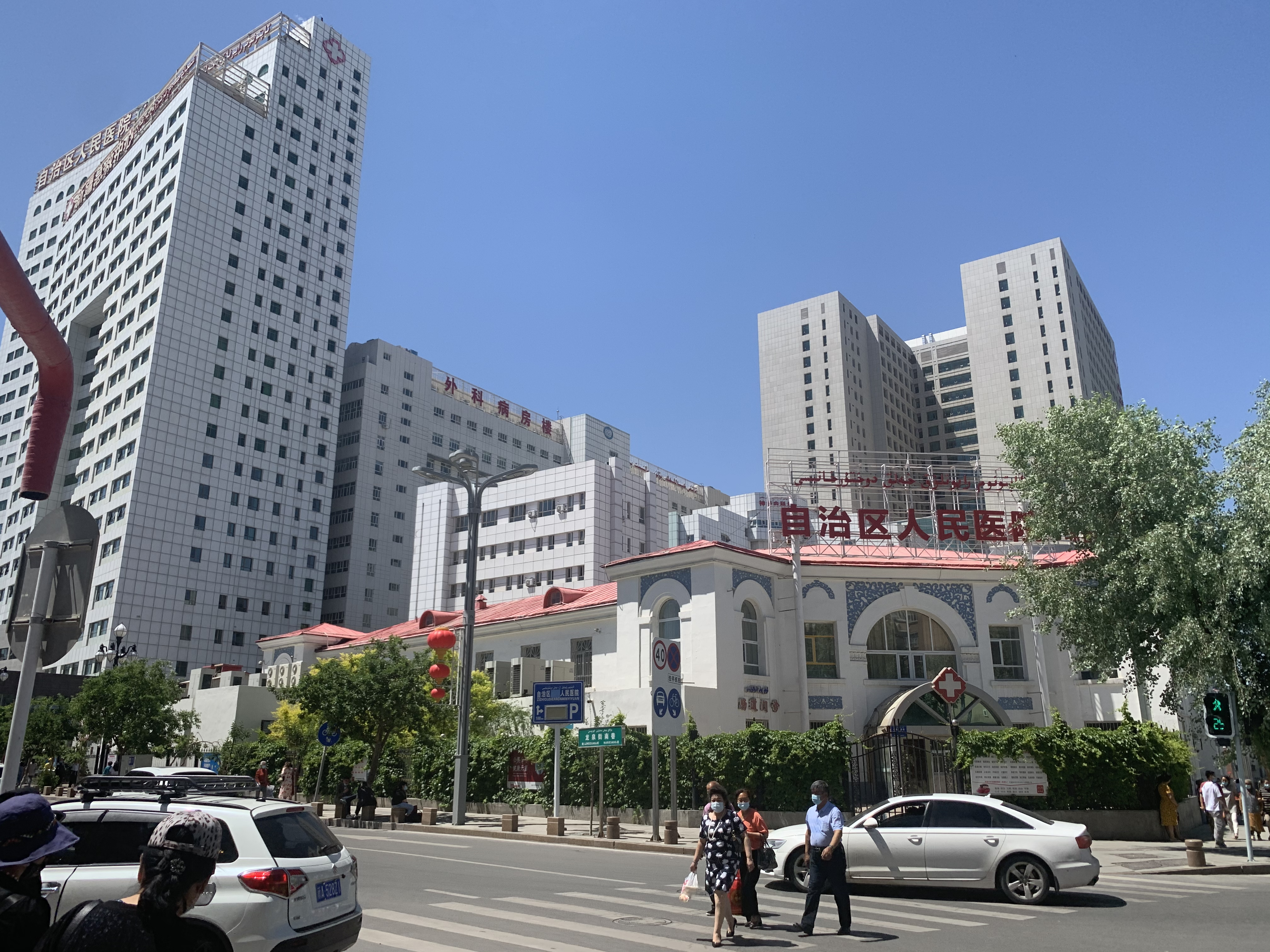
Xinjiang Uygur Autonomous Region People's Hospital

== Zhejiang ==
- First Affiliated Hospital of Zhejiang University School of Medicine
- The 1st Affiliated Hospital
- The 2nd Affiliated Hospital & Yuying Children's Hospital
- The 3rd Affiliated Hospital
- The 5th Affiliated Hospital
- The 6th Affiliated Hospital
- The Affiliated Eye Hospital
- The Affiliated Hospital of Stomatology
- The Affiliated Taizhou Hospital
- The Affiliated Wenling Hospital

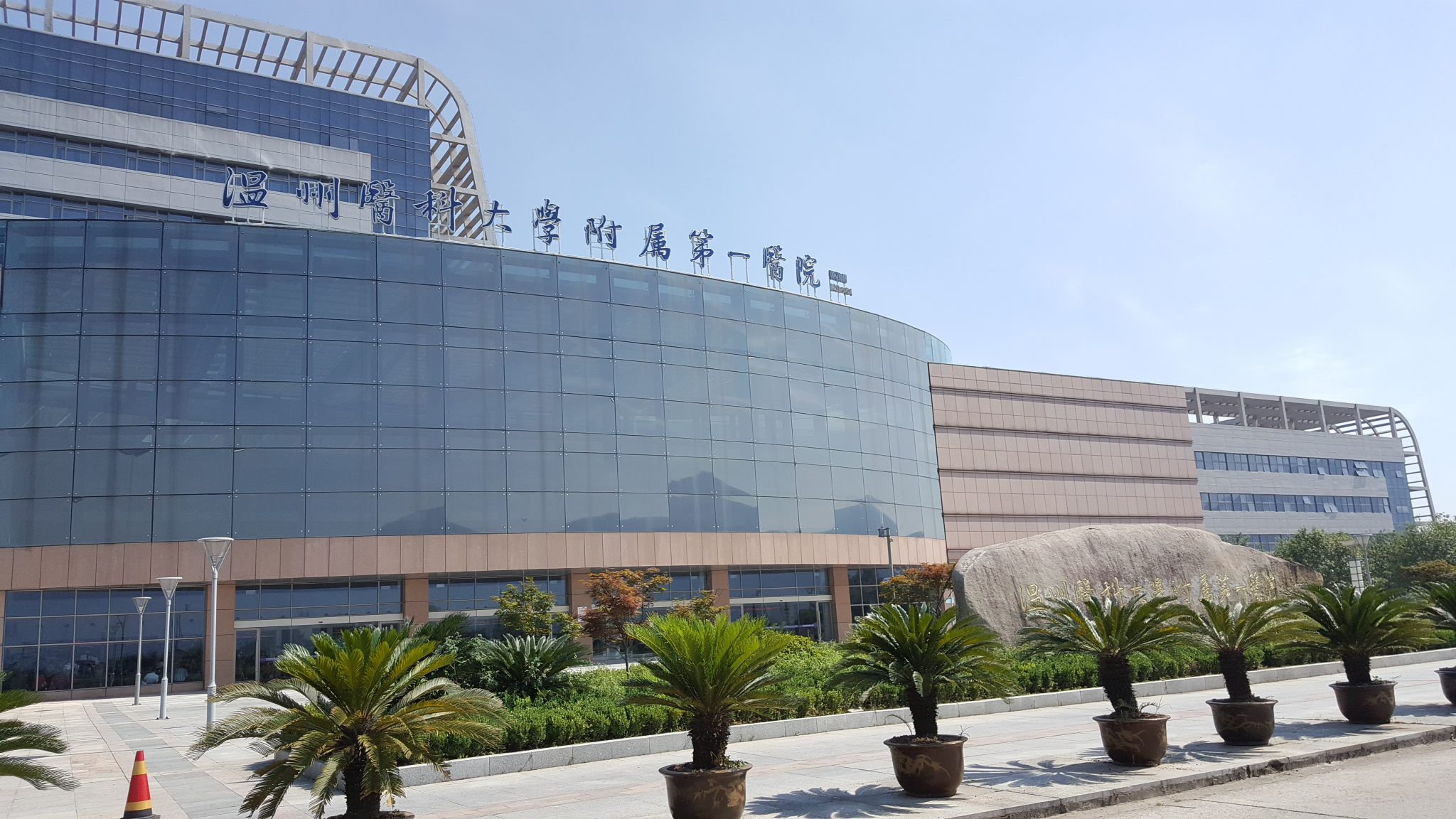
The 1st Affiliated Hospital of Wenzhou

- Second Affiliated Hospital of Zhejiang University School of Medicine
- Sir Run Run Shaw Hospital
- Women's Hospital, Zhejiang University
- Children's Hospital of Zhejiang University School of Medicine
- Zhejiang Cancer Hospital

== See also ==
- History of hospitals
- List of Christian Hospitals in China
