= The First Affiliated Hospital of Nanchang University =

Grade III Class A general hospital located in Nanchang City, Jiangxi Province

The First Affiliated Hospital of Nanchang University (Chinese: 南昌大学第一附属医院) is a Grade III Class A general hospital located in Nanchang City, Jiangxi Province of China. Founded in 1939, it has now developed into a top and the largest tertiary-level hospital in Jiangxi Province, integrating medical treatment, teaching, scientific research, emergency care, and preventive healthcare.

== History ==
In 1939, the Affiliated Hospital of Zhongzheng Medical College (Chinese: 中正醫學院) was officially established in Nanchang.

In 1949, the hospital was renamed the "Affiliated Hospital of Nanchang Medical College", then became the affiliated hospital of the Central China Military Region Medical College, Central South Military Region Medical College, Fourth Military Medical University and the Sixth Military Medical University successively; and then renamed the "173rd Military Medical Hospital".

In August 1958, the hospital was renamed "First Affiliated Hospital of Jiangxi Medical College".

In September 2005, Jianxi Medical College was merged into Nanchang University, and the hospital was renamed "First Affiliated Hospital of Nanchang University".

In 2020, the Xianghu Campus of the First Affiliated Hospital of Nanchang University was opened.

== Campus Distribution ==
The hospital has four campuses:

Donghu Campus (Main Campus): located at No. 17 Yongwai Zhengjie, Donghu District, Nanchang City. There are 2,900 inpatient beds.

Xianghu Campus: No. 1519 Dongyue Avenue, Dongxin Town, Nanchang County, Nanchang City. There are 3,200 inpatient beds.

High-tech Zone Campus: Changdong Avenue, Qingshanhu District, Nanchang.

Ganjiang New Area Campus.

== Other information ==
The First Affiliated Hospital of Nanchang University is the top and largest tertiary-level hospital in Jiangxi Province, integrating medical treatment, teaching, scientific research, emergency care, and preventive healthcare.

The hospital is particularly strong at General Surgery, Cardiology, Gastroenterology, and Orthopedics; and has been approved for human organ transplants and test-tube babies.

In 2025, the hospital served 5.6 million outpatient visits, and 124,500 surgeries.

In education, the hospital is also the First Clinical Medical College of Nanchang University, undertaking the teaching tasks for nearly 4,000 doctoral students, master's students, undergraduate students, continuing education students, advanced students, and international students.

In scientific research, the First Affiliated Hospital of Nanchang University published 68 papers listed in Nature Index for the time frame of 1 July 2025 - 30 June 2026, ranking 243rd globally and 103rd in China in healthcare. In addition, the hospital has won three National Invention Awards and three National Science and Technology Awards (Second Class).

In the 2024 China Hospital and Specialty Reputation Ranking, the First Affiliated Hospital of Nanchang Univeristy ranked A++ (top-60) in the comprehensive hospital ranking, 2nd in Pain Medicine and 8th in Burn Surgery nationally. It is the only hospital in Jiangxi Province to have been listed among the "Top 100 Hospitals in China" by Fudan University for nine consecutive years.

== See also ==
- Nanchang University
- List of hospitals in China
