= Second Affiliated Hospital of Xinjiang Medical University =

Second Affiliated Hospital of Xinjiang Medical University 新疆医科大学第二附属医院

Geography
- Location: Nanhu North Rd East 2nd Alley, Shuimogou District, Urumqi, Xinjiang, China
- Coordinates: 43.830517°N 87.616318°E

Organisation
- Type: Teaching
- Affiliated university: Xinjiang Medical University

Services
- Emergency department: Yes
- Beds: 1041

History
- Founded: 1954

Links
- Website: www1.xjmu.edu.cn
- Lists: Hospitals in China

The Second Affiliated Hospital of Xinjiang Medical University (Chinese: 新疆医科大学第二附属医院) is a teaching hospital in Urumqi, Xinjiang, China affiliated with Xinjiang Medical University.

== History ==
On October 25, 1954 the Xinjiang Military District issued a letter for the establishment of the Xinjiang Production and Construction Corps, the First Military Hospital. In June 1954, the Ministry of Health and the Northwest Field Army Corps preparing to come to the proposed sites in the field for investigation, preparation of construction plans. In August 1954, construction of the hospital began.

== Composition ==
Hospital is divided into two parts;

1. 7-Bay Hospital (old house)
2. South Lake Hospital (new house)

It has a total of 1041 beds, 47 medical and clinical departments, clinical teaching and research section. Hospital has a professionally trained staff including 102 professional and technical staff, more than 70 master's degree doctors, more than 250 mid-level professionals and technicians. It is a level-A rated hospital in Xinjiang treating bone and joint diseases and peripheral nerve diseases. Xinjiang deaf and dumb rehabilitation, prevention and treatment center is also a major project of this hospital.

== Treatment facilities ==
Hospital has:

1. Two-Philips 1.5T gradient nuclear magnetic resonance imaging instrument (MRI)
2. 16-slice CT machine
3. Two-board digital movie system (DR)
4. Siemens DSA 1000 mA System
5. GE digital gastrointestinal X-ray machines
6. High-grade abdominal radiology machines
7. Cardiac-specific color Doppler ultrasound diagnostic apparatus
8. OLYMPUS2700 automatic biochemical analyzer

and other biochemical analyzer equipment. With various minimally invasive surgery and endoscopic surgical microscopes and advanced cardiac surgery equipment and operating room.

== Achievements ==
The hospital has received more than 50 scientific and technological awards, 32 medical professionals have published more than 1,000 research articles in the Chinese Journal of Medicine.
