= TEDA International Cardiovascular Hospital =

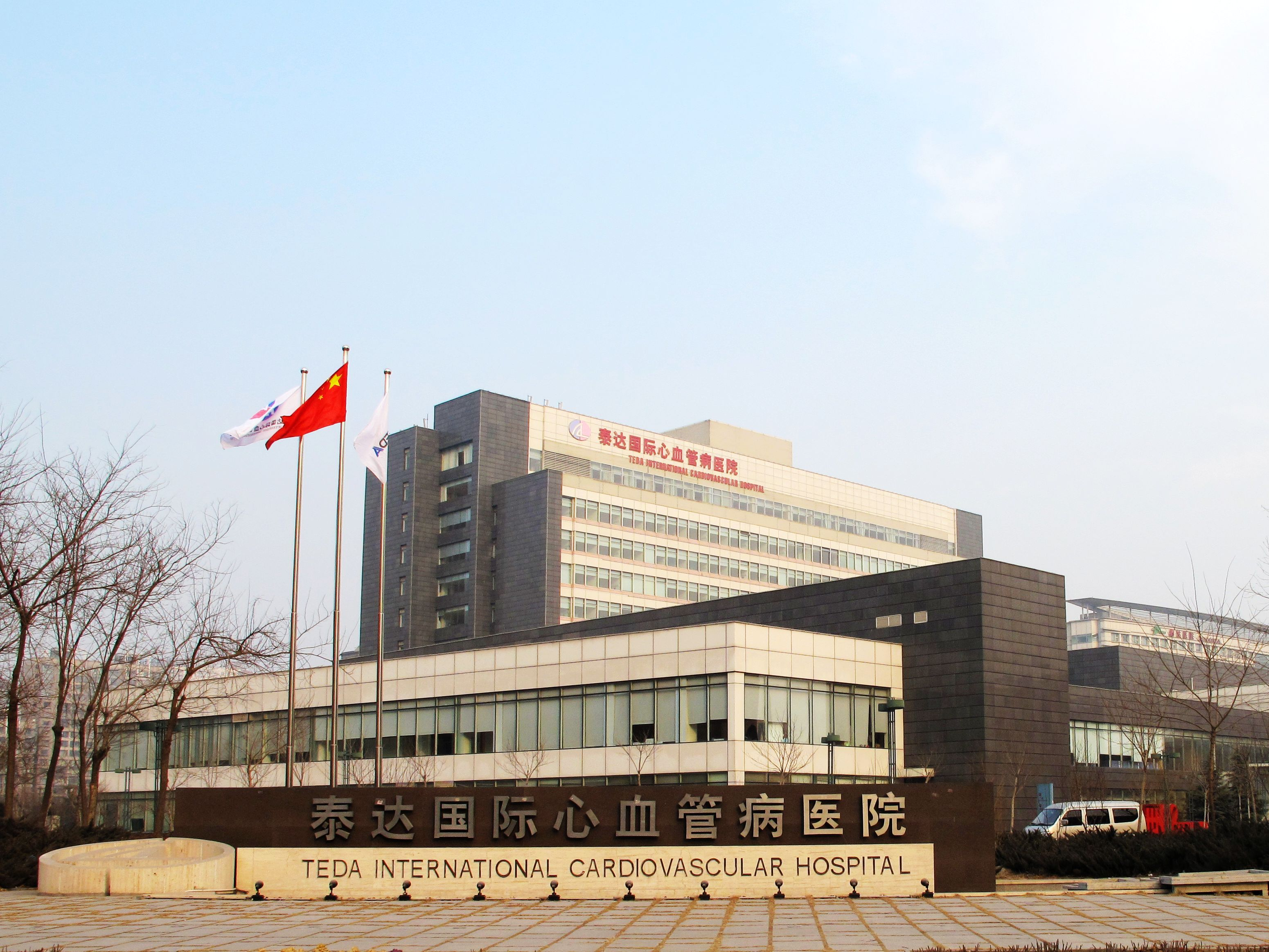

- Location within China

Geography
- Location: 61 Third Street, Tianjin, China
- Coordinates: 39.0284°N 117.7142°E

Organisation
- Type: Specialist

Services
- Speciality: Cardiovascular medicine

Links
- Website: en.tedaich.com
- Lists: Hospitals in China

TEDA International Cardiovascular Hospital (Chinese: 泰达国际心血管病医院) is a specialist cardiovascular hospital in the Binhai New Area of Tianjin, China.
