= Sixth Affiliated Hospital of Xinjiang Medical University =

No. Six Affiliated Hospital of Xinjiang Medical University 新疆医科大学第六附属医院

Geography
- Location: 39 Five-Star S Rd, Tianshan District, Urumqi, Xinjiang, China
- Coordinates: 43.809331°N 87.631632°E

Organisation
- Type: Teaching
- Affiliated university: Xinjiang Medical University

Services
- Emergency department: Yes

History
- Former name: Xinjiang Jiangong Hospital
- Founded: 1957

Links
- Website: www.xjmu.org
- Lists: Hospitals in China

The No. Six Affiliated Hospital of Xinjiang Medical University (新疆医科大学第六附属医院) is a teaching hospital in Urumqi, Xinjiang, China affiliated with Xinjiang Medical University. It was established in 1957 as Xinjiang Jiangong Hospital (新疆建工医院).
