= Fuwai Hospital =

Fuwai Hospital, CAMS & PUMC 中国医学科学院阜外医院
- National Health Commission of the People's Republic of China
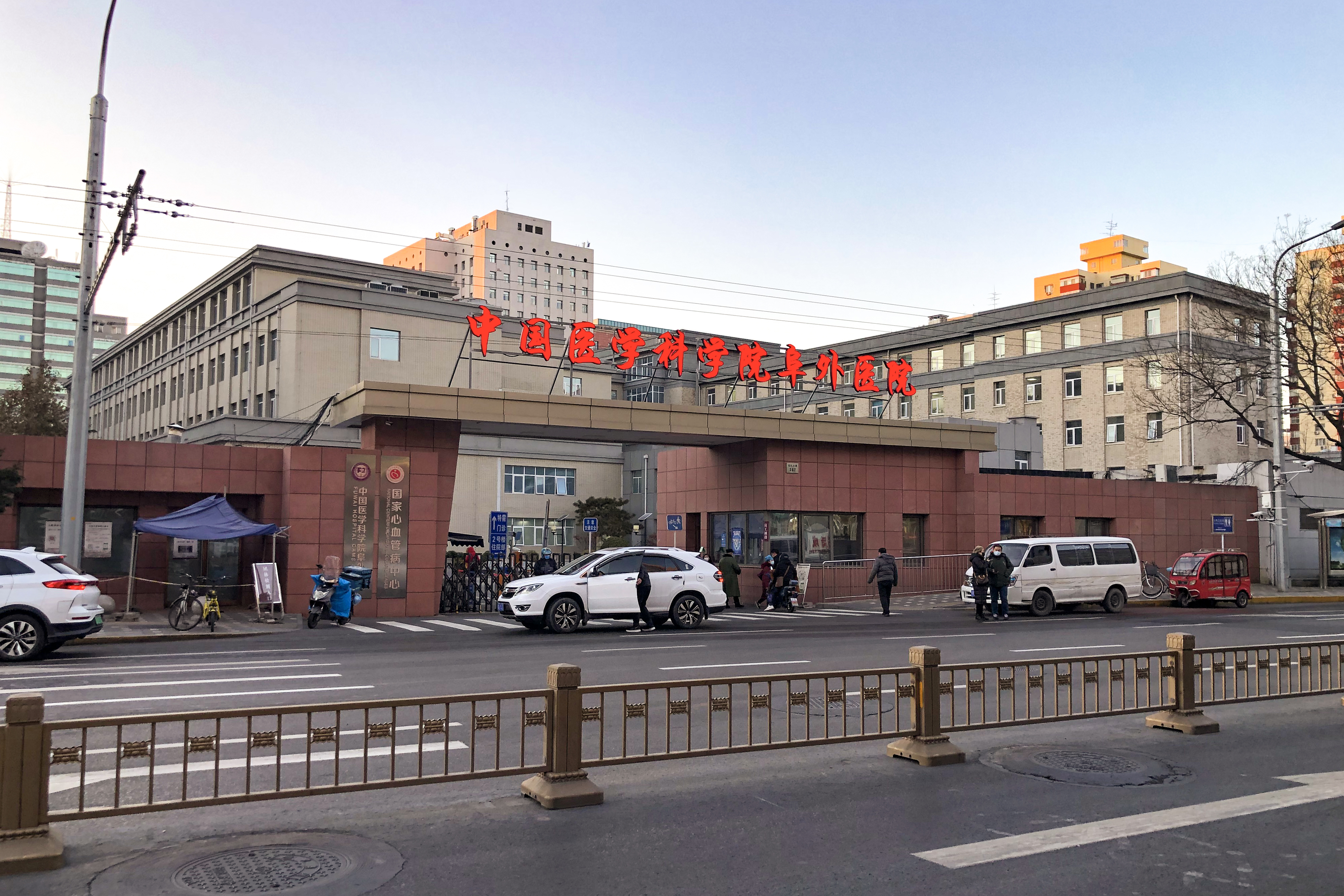
- East Gate of Fuwai Hospital (December 2020)

Geography
- Location: No.167, North Lishi Road, Xicheng District, Beijing, China, CN
- Coordinates: 39.923010°N 116.346328°E

Organisation
- Type: Specialist Hospital
- Affiliated university: Chinese Academy of Medical Sciences

Services
- Standards: 3A
- Beds: 1,200+

History
- Founded: 1956

Links
- Website: www.fuwai.com

Fuwai Hospital (simplified Chinese: 阜外医院; traditional Chinese: 阜外醫院; pinyin: Fùwài Yīyuàn), full name Fuwai Hospital of the Chinese Academy of Medical Sciences, is the largest cardiovascular science center. Established in Beijing in 1956, it is ranked as a Grade A tertiary hospital and National Center for Cardiovascular Diseases. It is well known internationally for treatment of all kinds of cardiovascular diseases.

== History ==
In the spring of 1956, the Chest Hospital of the Chinese People’s Liberation Army (PLA) was established based on the PLA 122 Sanatorium in Beijing, north of the Summer Palace. In August 1958, the PLA Chest Hospital was transferred to the Chinese Academy of Medical Sciences, and it was officially named as "Fuchengmenwai Hospital of the Chinese Academy of Medical Sciences" or "Fuwai Hospital" for short.

After recognition of its cardiovascular specialization in 1961, the hospital was alternatively named the Institute for Cardiovascular Diseases in May 1962. In 1994, it was renamed as "Fuwai Cardiovascular Hospital, Chinese Academy of Medical Sciences". In 2014, the hospital was renamed as "Fuwai Hospital, Chinese Academy of Medical Sciences".

In 1996, the hospital was selected into the first batch of 3A hospitals, since reclassified as a Grade A tertiary hospital. In 2010, the Chinese government began recognizing National Centers for Cardiovascular Diseases with Fuwai Hospital as a model of excellence.

== Facilities ==
Fuwai Hospital is the world’s largest cardiovascular science center, internationally known for its treatment of complex and severe cardiovascular diseases. It is also China's national center for cardiovascular clinical healthcare, medical research, disease prevention, and education. Fuwai Hospital is the National Clinical Research Center, State Key Laboratory of Cardiovascular Disease, and National Clinical Research Center of Cardiovascular Diseases. Its staff are major writers of academic articles on cardiology.

There are now 22 clinical centers covering cardiology, cardiovascular surgery, laboratories, and cardiovascular disorders. The hospital has more than 1200 beds and an annual caseload of 15000 cardiac surgeries and 50000 procedures. In addition to its Beijing headquarters, Fuwai Hospital has branches in other places of China, including Shenzhen, Qingdao, Yunnan and Zhengzhou. The education programs provided by the hospital include Zhu Xiaodong Scholarship, training program of Vascular Surgery Department, and training program of China Oxford Centre for International Health Research, which train both domestic and international students.

== Dispute ==
In June 2023, Xu Bo, director of the Interventional Catheterization Laboratory of Fuwai Hospital, was placed under disciplinary review over suspected illegal activity. He previously served as deputy director of the National Clinical Research Center for Cardiovascular Diseases, working as senior engineer and researcher.

== See also ==
- Chinese Academy of Medical Sciences
- List of hospitals in China
