= Children's Hospital of Chongqing Medical University =

Children’s Hospital of Chongqing Medical University (Chinese: 重庆医科大学附属儿童医院)
- Liangjiang Campus

Geography
- Location: Chongqing, China

Organisation
- Type: Public, Teaching, Specialist
- Affiliated university: Chongqing Medical University

Services
- Standards: 3A
- Beds: 2,480

History
- Founded: 1956

Links
- Website: https://www.chcmu.com/

The Children’s Hospital of Chongqing Medical University is a leading pediatric hospital in western China. Founded in 1956, it is now a large Grade A tertiary hospital and the National Clinical Research Center for Child Health and Disorders in Chongqing of China, integrating medical treatment, education and research.

== History ==
The children's hospital was established in 1956, by relocation of the Department of Pediatrics of Shanghai Medical College (now Shanghai Medical College of Fudan University) to Chongqing.

Later, the hospital was rated as a Grade A tertiary hospital and "Model Hospital for Improving Medical Services".

In 2019, it was approved to be the National Child Health and Disease Clinical Research Center and one of the first batch of national first-class undergraduate major construction sites.

In 2021, the Children's Hospital of Chongqing Medical University ranked third among children's hospitals in the national assessment of tertiary public hospitals in China.

In the 2024 China Hospital and Specialty Reputation Ranking, the Children's Hospital of Chongqing Medical University ranked A+ (top-80) in the comprehensive hospital ranking and 4th in both Pediatric Medicine and Pediatric Surgery nationwide.

== Current situation ==
The Children's Hospital of Chongqing Medical University is one of China's largest children's hospitals, with more than 3,900 staff members and 2,300 patient beds. As of 2025, the hospital served 3.6664 million outpatient and emergency visits and 114,700 inpatients.

There are 43 clinical and technical departments, among which the departments of critical care, respiratory, neonatology, surgery and clinical nursing are in the national key specialty construction projects. The hospital is also strong at liver transplants, treatment of congenital heart disease, and minimally invasive surgery.

In education, the hospital trains students at undergraduate, master, doctoral, and post-doctoral levels. It is also the only one National Pediatric Standardized Training Demonstration Base in China.

In scientific research, the Children's Hospital of Chongqing Medical University totally published 33 papers listed in Nature Index for the time period of 1 July 2025 - 30 June 2026, among which 29 were in Health Sciences, ranking 345th globally and 141th in China in healthcare. It is also the National Clinical Research Center for Child Health and Disorders.

The hospital has developed international cooperation with 16 oversea medical institutions, including the Cincinnati Children's Hospital Medical Center in the United States and the Institute of Child Health at University College London in the United Kingdom.

There are two campuses of the hospital:

- Yuzhong Campus: located at 136 Zhongshan Second Road, Yuzhong District, Chongqing.
- Liangjiang Campus: 20 Jinyu Avenue, Liangjiang New Area, Chongqing.

== See also ==
- Chongqing Medical University
- List of hospitals in China
