= Peking University International Hospital =

Coordinates: 39.996636°N 116.313682°E

Geography
- Location: Haidian District, Beijing, China

Organisation
- Care system: Medicare
- Type: General

Services
- Emergency department: Yes
- Beds: 1,800

History
- Founded: Opened on December 5, 2014

Links
- Website: http://www.pkucare.com/cn
- Lists: Hospitals in China

Peking University International Hospital (Chinese: 北大国际医院; pinyin: běidàguójìyīyuàn) is a non-profit hospital affiliated with Peking University. It is a combination of medicare, teaching and research to be in line with the international practices, that provides medical services for patients covered by Beijing social medical insurance, commercial insurance, public medicare and foreign insurances. The overall investment for the hospital is 3.2 billion, with a building area of 310,000 square metres (3,300,000 sq ft). It is currently under construction starting from March 2010, and will become the largest single medical building in Asia. The hospital is located in the Zhongguancun Life Science Park. The investment was made by Beijing International Hospital Group. Qide Han, the vice chairperson of the National People's Congress (NPC) of the People's Republic of China, Chief Office of Beijing University Health Science Center, will serve as the Honorary Chairman of the board.

== Overview ==
The hospital positions itself as a general hospital centering on several dominant disciplines, based on the subject specialties of Peking University. 36 medical centers and 49 medical disciplines are determined. As an affiliated hospital of Peking University, it is inherited from the strong disciplines of the university, as well as evolves many of its subjects. The disciplines to be focused on are: cardiovascular department, neoplasms/blood department, ophthalmology department, women and children's department, neuroscience department, urology department and renal disease department.

== Scope of service ==
Clinical services:

- Cardiovascular
- Neoplasms/Blood
- Ophthalmology
- Women and children's care
- Neuroscience
- Urology
- Renal disease

== Hospital building design ==
Through a design competition, Peking University International Hospital sought a design for a satellite facility in the growing suburbs. Perkins Eastman proposed a 280,000-square-metre (3,000,000 sq ft), 12-story hospital for the 3-hectare (7.4-acre) parcel of land located about 32 km (20 mi) northwest of central Beijing.

To bring organization to a large site, the design team chose a circle inscribed inside a square as the overall design element. The landscaped square gives the site a defined border, and the circular ambulatory care and cancer center building harmoniously organize different large-scale program elements. The design reflects the three-part organization of the medical zone: patient care towers, outpatient ambulatory care wing, and medical technology space; and gives each portion a distinct and appropriate appearance. Patient bed towers are carefully sited to comply with requirements for direct exposure to the south to provide light and views.

The two-phase plan calls for 2,000 hospital beds, an ambulatory care center to serve 10,000 outpatients daily, and a large emergency department with adult and pediatric areas. Specialized services encompass centers for cardiovascular services, oncology, women’s and children’s services, and a conference center.
