= Jiangsu Provincial People's Hospital =

Hospital in Nanjing, Jiangsu, China

The Jiangsu Provincial People's Hospital, shortly Jiangsu Provincial Hospital, or "Jiangsu Province Hospital", is a leading Grade A tertiary hospital in Nanjing City, Jiangsu Province of China. It is also known as the "First Affiliated Hospital of Nanjing Medical University", "Jiangsu Provincial Academy of Clinical Medicine" and "Jiangsu Provincial Red Cross Hospital". Established in 1936, it is now the largest comprehensive hospital in Jiangsu Province, responsible for medical treatment, teaching and research.

== History ==
In 1936, the Clinic Affiliated with Jiangsu Medical College was established in Zhenjiang, Jiangsu Province.

In 1950, the clinic moved to Nanjing, merged with the "Nanjing Workers' Hospital", and became an affiliated hospital of Jiangsu Medical College.

In 1985, Jiangsu Provincial Workers' Hospital was renamed "Jiangsu Provincial People's Hospital", also known as the First Affiliated Hospital of Nanjing Medical College.

In 1993, Nanjing Medical College became Nanjing Medical University, and the hospital was renamed the "First Affiliated Hospital of Nanjing Medical University".

In 2019, Jiangsu Provincial Hospital ranked 9th in the Chinese Hospital STEM Ranking released by the Chinese Academy of Medical Sciences.

In 2022, the Yangzhou Branch of the Provincial People's Hospital was inaugurated.

In 2024, the hospital became one of the two hospitals in Jiangsu Province rated A+++ in the "2023 China Hospital Comprehensive Ranking".

In 2024, the annual revenue of the hospital exceeded 10 billion Chinese yuans.

== Current status ==
Jiangsu Provincial Hospital is now the largest comprehensive hospital in Jiangsu Province, responsible for medical treatment, medical teaching, scientific research and hospital ethics activities. It is a Grade A tertiary hospital

The hospital covers an area of about 410,000 square meters, with 270,000 sq m of construction area. There are 5,200 beds, and more than 7,000 employees.

The hospital has cooperation with hospitals, departments and laboratories in the United States, Japan, Korea, Canada, Australia and Italy.

The hospital is a member of the national emergency medical team. It is a teaching hospital for Nanjing Medical University and serves as a national demonstration base for residence training.

The Jiangsu Provincial Academy of Clinical Medicine is established on the basis of the hospital.

The Jiangsu Provincial People's Hospital published 126 papers listed in Nature Index for the Time frame of 1 January 2025 - 31 December 2025, ranking 77th globally and 25th in China in healthcare.

Address: No. 300 Guangzhou Road, Nanjing City, China.

== Branches ==
The campuses and branches of Jiangsu Provincial People's Hospital include:

- The Guangzhou Road Campus (Address: No. 300 Guangzhou Road, Nanjing)
- Longjiang Campus (the Jiangsu Woman and Children Health Hospital, Address: No. 368 Jiangdong North Road, Nanjing)
- Yuhuatai Campus (Address: Digital Avenue, Yuhuatai District, Nanjing)
- National Regional Medical Center (Chongqing Hospital)
- The Yangzhou Branch of the Provincial People's Hospital, located in Yangzhou City.
- Jiangsu Shengze Hospital, also known as "Jiangsu Provincial Hospital Shengze Branch".

== See also ==
- Nanjing Medical University
- List of hospitals in China
