= Cancer Hospital, Chinese Academy of Medical Sciences =

Cancer Hospital, Chinese Academy of Medical Sciences (中国医学科学院肿瘤医院)
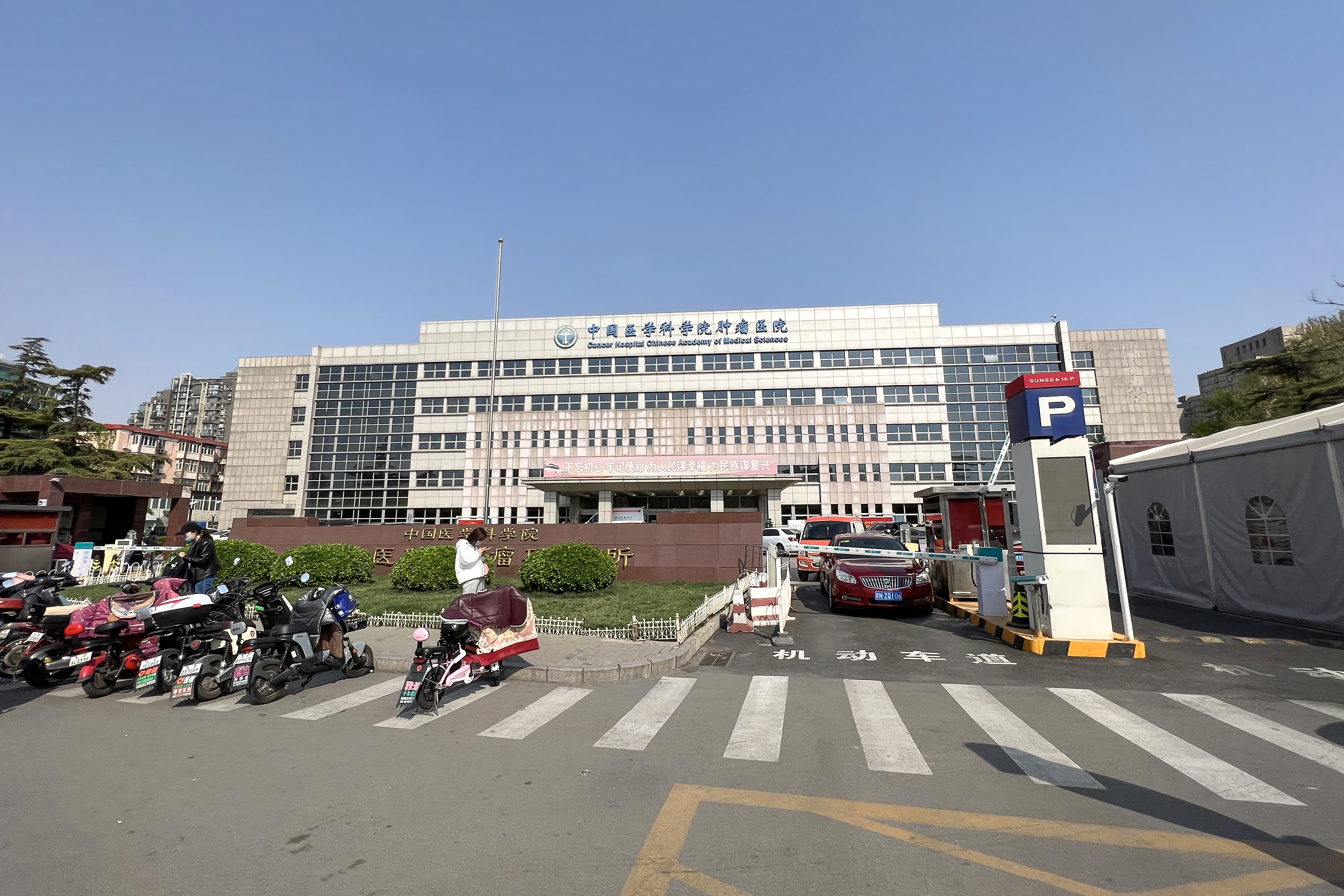
- West gate of the hospital

Geography
- Location: No. 17, Panjiayuan South Lane, Chaoyang District, Beijing, PRC
- Coordinates: 39.872°N 116.441°E

Organisation
- Type: Specialist hospital
- Affiliated university: Chinese Academy of Medical Sciences

Services
- Standards: 3A

Links
- Website: http://www.cicams.ac.cn/

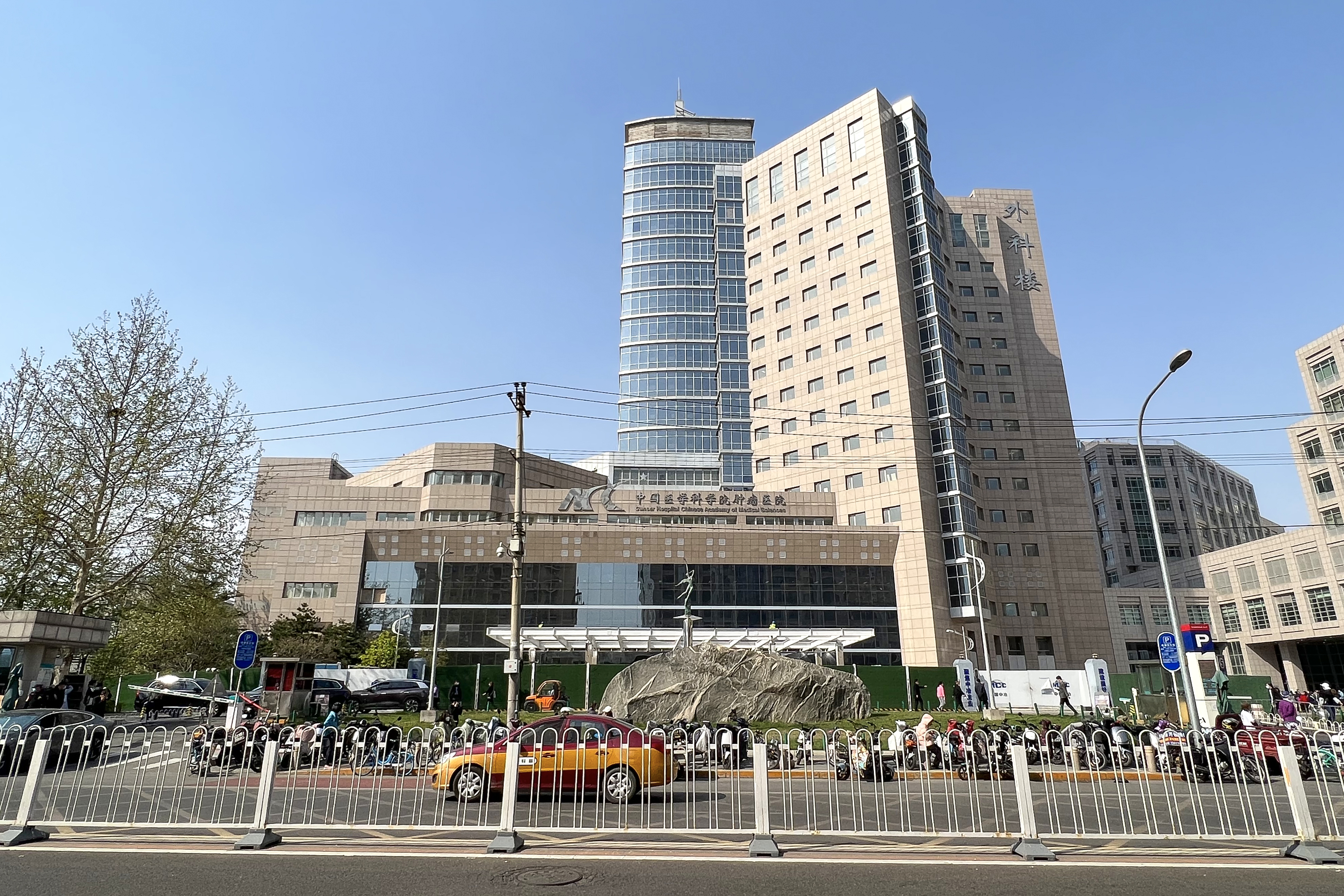
South gate of the Hospital (Surgical Building)

The Cancer Hospital of the Chinese Academy of Medical Sciences is a Grade A tertiary hospital by the Longtan Lake in Beijing. Founded in 1958, the hospital is the first and largest specialized cancer hospital established in the People's Republic of China. It is also a leading national center for cancer prevention, treatment, research, and teaching.

== History ==
in 1958, the Ritan Hospital was founded in Beijing. It was the first specialized cancer hospital established since the founding of the People's Republic of China.

In 1962, the Cancer Research Institute was set up in the hospital. And subsequently, cancer prevention and control sites were established in Henan Province and Jiangsu Province.

In 1983, the hospital moved to the southeast of Longtan Lake in Beijing and was officially renamed the "Cancer Institute & Hospital, Chinese Academy of Medical Sciences". In the same year, the hospital was designated as the WHO Collaborating Center for Cancer Research in China.

In 1996, the hospital passed the evaluation to become a Grade A tertiary hospital (at the top level in China).

In 2011, the hospital was designated as the National Cancer Center.

In March 2017, a branch hospital was built in Shenzhen and started operation. It is located in Longgang District, with a floor area of 141,288 square meters on 96,403 square meters of land.

In September 2022, the Henan branch was inaugurated.

In December 2023, another branch of the Cancer Hospital of the Chinese Academy of Medical Sciences opened in Langfang City, Hebei Province.

In January 2026, the Cancer Hospital of the Chinese Academy of Medical Sciences established China's first large-scale pan-cancer real-world genome database.

== Present situation ==
The Cancer Hospital of the Chinese Academy of Medical Sciences serves 1.02 million outpatients, 76,000 inpatients, and performs 32,000 operations annually. There are 1500 beds. In the national performance evaluation of tertiary public hospitals, the hospital consistently ranks first among tertiary oncology hospitals nationwide.

The hospital owns one national key laboratory and one national clinical medical research center. It has received 26 national-level awards, including three first-class National Science and Technology Progress Awards. It has in the recent years published nearly 100 articles in high-level journals such as CA Cancer J Clin, Nature, Lancet, and Cell. The hospital has also founded and published several professional academic journals, including the all-English Journal of the National Cancer Center.

The hospital is the largest cancer prevention and research center in China, and a national drug clinical research base of the State Drug Administration. The hospital integrates cancer treatment, scientific research and teaching, and conducts comprehensive research on the prevention, diagnosis and treatment of cancer. It is also a national pioneer in cancer clinical trials.

== See also ==
- Chinese Academy of Medical Sciences
- List of hospitals in China

== External ==
- Official website
- Youtube channel
