= Third Affiliated Hospital of Sun Yat-sen University =

The Third Affiliated Hospital, Sun Yat-sen University (Chinese: 中山大学附属第三医院)
- Hospital Main Campus

Geography
- Location: No. 600, Tianhe Road, Tianhe District, Guangzhou City, Guangdong Province, People's Republic of China
- Coordinates: 23°8′15.31″N 113°20′10.5″E

Organisation
- Care system: China's medical insurance
- Type: Public, comprehensive, 3A
- Affiliated university: Sun Yat-sen University

History
- Former name: Shipai Outpatient Department of Sun Yat-sen Medical College
- Founded: July 17, 1971 (55 years ago)

Links
- Website: https://www.zssy.com.cn/en

The Third Affiliated Hospital of Sun Yat-sen University is a Grade III Class A hospital located in Tianhe District of Guangzhou in south China. It is affiliated with Sun Yat-sen University and is directly managed by the National Health Commission of the People's Republic of China. Founded in 1971, the hospital is now a large comprehensive medical center responsible for medical treatment, education and research.

== History ==
In July 17, 1971, the Shipai Outpatient Department of Sun Yat-sen Medical College was established in Shipai. It was the first medical institution in the eastern suburbs of Guangzhou. There were 80 employees and 30 simple hospital beds.

In June 1972, the infectious disease department of Sun Yat-sen Medical College was moved from the First Affiliated Hospital to the Shipai Outpatient Department.

On April 10, 1973, Shipai Outpatient Department was upgraded and renamed the "Third Affiliated Hospital of Sun Yat-sen Medical College". There were 193 beds and 234 staff members.

In 1985, the Sun Yat-sen Medical College was renamed "Sun Yat-sen Medical University" and the hospital was renamed the "Third Affiliated Hospital of Sun Yat-sen Medical University".

In 1992, the number of beds available reached 500.

On June 29, 1995, the hospital was rated as a "Grade III Class A Hospital".

In 2001, Sun Yat-sen Medical University merged with Sun Yat-sen University and the hospital was renamed the "Third Affiliated Hospital of Sun Yat-sen University".

In 2011, the Lingnan Campus (or Luogang Campus) of the Third Affiliated Hospital of Sun Yat-sen University was opened.

In 2014, the Yuedong Campus was put into use, and became the first Grade III Class A comprehensive hospital in Meizhou City of East Guangdong on June 20, 2018.

In 2021, the Zhaoqing Campus (Zhaoqing Hospital of the Third Affiliated Hospital of Sun Yat-sen University) was opened in Zhaoqing of Guangdong.

== Campuses ==
Currently the Third Affiliated Hospital of Sun Yat-sen University has four campuses (or sub-hospitals), with more than 2,880 beds.

- Tianhe Campus (Main Campus): Located at 600 Tianhe Road, Tianhe District, Guangzhou.

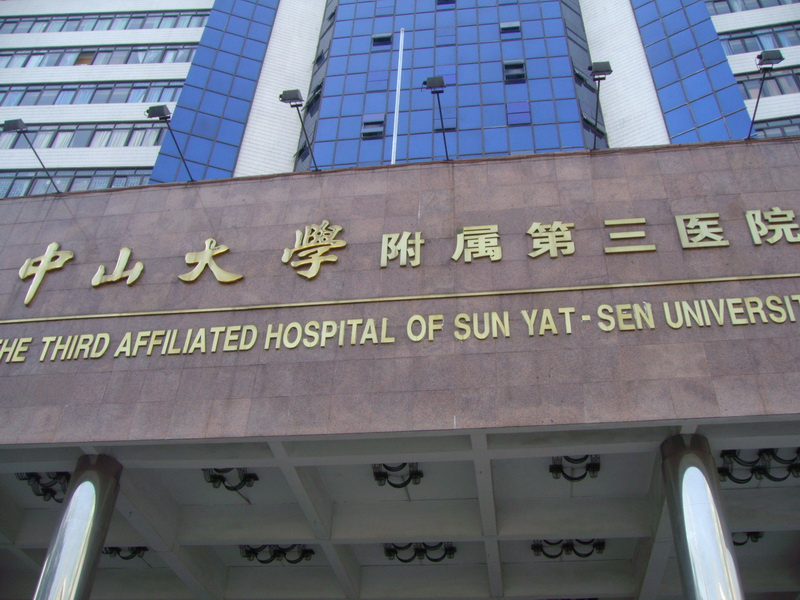
Tianhe Campus (Main Campus) Building 1 (Outpatient Building)

- Lingnan Campus (Luogang Hospital): A comprehensive tertiary-level Grade A hospital jointly built by the former Luogang District Government of Guangzhou City and Sun Yat-sen University, covering an area of 87,000 square meters. It was officially opened on August 29, 2011. On November 30, 2024, the second phase of the Campus was completed.
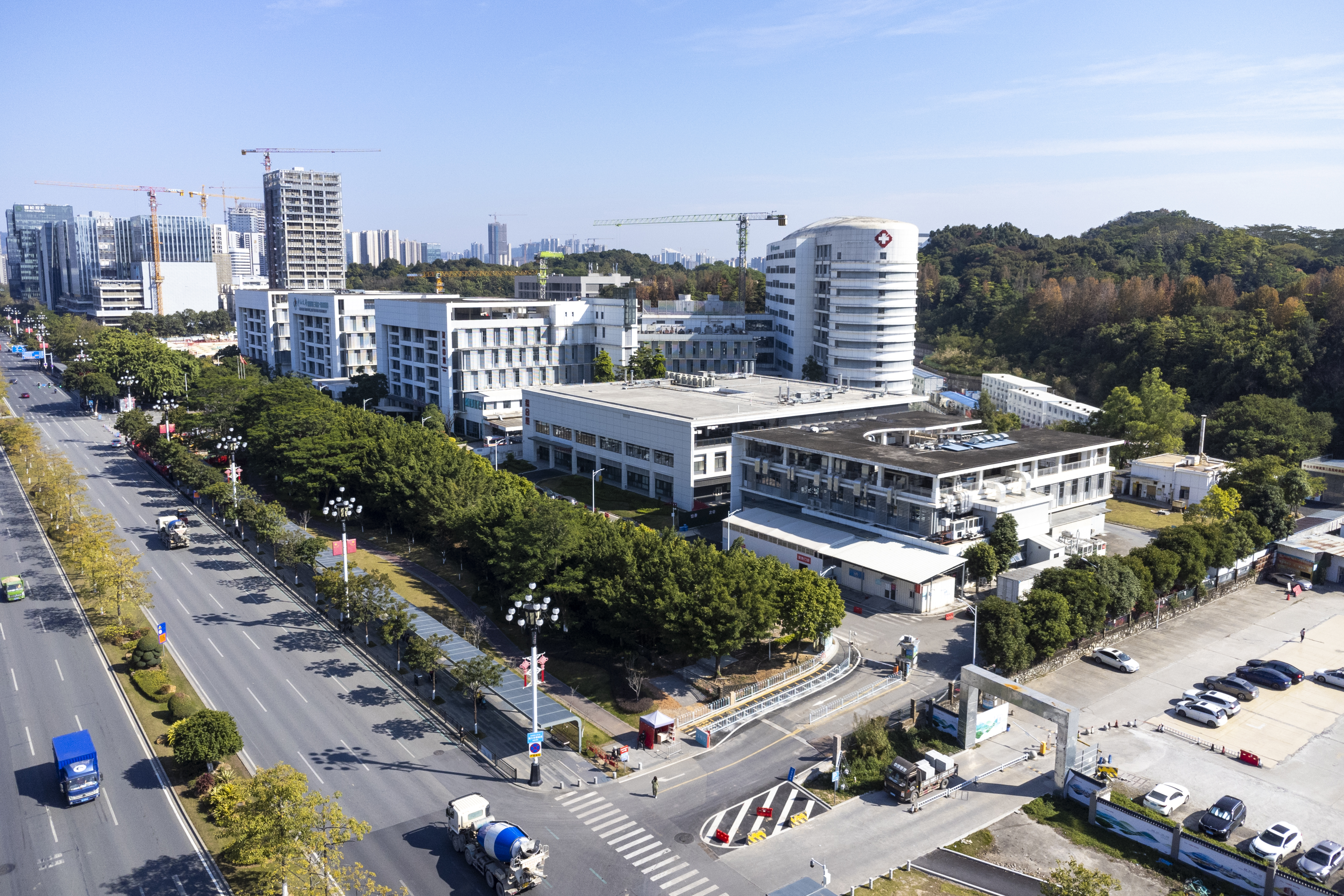
  Luogang Campus (Lingnan Hospital）
- The Yuedong Campus: Founded in 1937, its predecessor was the Meixian District People's Hospital of Meizhou City. In February 2014, the Meixian District People's Government and Sun Yat-sen University signed a cooperation trusteeship framework agreement, entrusting the newly built Meixian People's Hospital campus to the Third Affiliated Hospital of Sun Yat-sen University for operation and management, and naming it "The Third Affiliated Hospital of Sun Yat-sen University Yuedong Hospital". After five years of preparation and construction, Yuedong Hospital was officially put into use on October 8, 2014, and became the first Grade III Class A comprehensive hospital in Meizhou City on June 20, 2018.
- Zhaoqing Campus (under construction): Built in cooperation between the Zhaoqing Municipal People's Government and the Third Affiliated Hospital of Sun Yat-sen University, construction began in April 2015, and it was officially opened on November 22, 2021.

The campuses of Tianhe and Lingnan have totally 3,864 employers, with about 12,000 daily outpatient and emergency department visits in Tianhe Campus, and about 2,600 in Lingnan Campus.

== Other information ==
The Third Affiliated Hospital of Sun Yat-sen University is most famous for its hepatology and hepatobiliary surgery departments. Hepatology, encephalopathy, and immunological diseases are the three major disciplines that the hospital focuses on developing.

In medical education, the hospital holds 30 master's degree programs, 23 doctoral programs, and one postdoctoral program.

In academic research, the hospital published more than 600 articles as first authors on SCI journals, among which 87 papers are listed in Nature Index for the Time frame of 1 June 2025 - 30 May 2026, ranking 108th globally and 43rd in China in healthcare.

== See also ==
- Zhongshan School of Medicine, Sun Yat-sen University
- Sun Yat-sen University
- List of hospitals in China
