= Fifth Affiliated Hospital of Xinjiang Medical University =

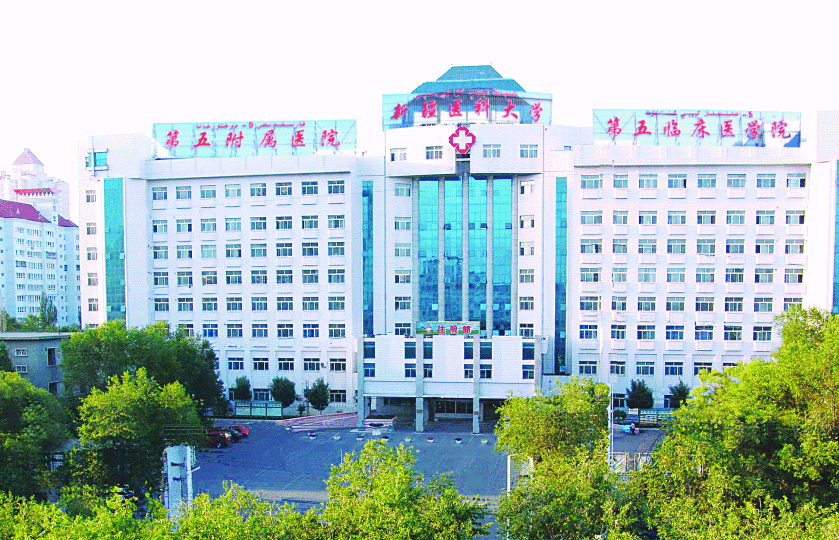

Geography
- Location: Urumqi, Xinjiang, China

Organisation
- Type: Teaching
- Affiliated university: Xinjiang Medical University

Services
- Emergency department: Yes

History
- Founded: 1960

Links
- Lists: Hospitals in China

The Fifth Affiliated Hospital of Xinjiang Medical University is a teaching hospital in Urumqi, Xinjiang, China affiliated with Xinjiang Medical University. It is built on the basis of the former Urumqi Central Railroad Hospital and has a total area of 52,880 square metres (569,200 sq ft) with a total floor space of 79,744 square metres (858,360 sq ft).
