= Zhongshan Ophthalmic Center =

Zhongshan Ophthalmic Center, Sun Yat-sen University (Chinese: 中山大学中山眼科中心)
- Ouzhuang Hospital Campus

Geography
- Location: Guangzhou, Guangdong Province, People's Republic of China

Organisation
- Type: Public, specialist, 3A
- Affiliated university: Sun Yat-sen University
- Network: Guangdong-Hong Kong-Macao Higher Education Ophthalmology Alliance, International Center for Ophthalmology

History
- Founded: November 12, 1965 (61 years ago)

Links
- Website: http://www.gzzoc.org.cn/en

The Zhongshan Ophthalmic Center, full name "Zhongshan Ophthalmic Center of Sun Yat-sen University", also known as the "Affiliated Eye Hospital of Sun Yat-sen University", is a large eye medical institution located in Guangzhou, China. It is the only ophthalmology hospital directly under the National Health Commission. Founded in 1965, the Center is now the largest public ophthalmology hospital in China, holding a leading position in medical treatment, research and education.

== History ==
The predecessor of Zhongshan Ophthalmic Center can be traced back to 1835, when US missionary Doctor Peter Parker established in Guangzhou the first Western-style eye clinic of China.

In 1953, the Teaching and Research Office of Ophthalmology was established in Sun Yat-sen Medical College. It was composed of the former ophthalmology departments of Lingnan University School of Medicine, Sun Yat-sen University School of Medicine, and Guanghua School of Medicine.

In 1965, under the leadership of renowned ophthalmologists Chen Yaozhen and Mao Wenshu, the "Ophthalmology Hospital of Sun Yat-sen Medical College" was officially established at Ouzhuang of Guangzhou, pioneering the establishment of affiliated ophthalmology hospitals by Chinese universities. There were 122 beds.

In June 1983, with the approval of the Ministry of Health, the "Zhongshan Ophthalmic Center of Sun Yat-sen Medical College was established", comprising an ophthalmology hospital, an ophthalmology research institute, and an office for the prevention and treatment of blindness. It was the first modern, multi-functional ophthalmic center in China integrating medical treatment, teaching, research, and the prevention and treatment of blindness.

In 1985, Sun Yat-sen Medical College was renamed "Sun Yat-sen University of Medical Sciences", and the Center was renamed "Zhongshan Ophthalmic Center of Sun Yat-sen University of Medical Sciences".

In 1995, the Center passed the evaluation for a Grade A tertiary hospital, and became the first 3A ophthalmic hospital in China.

In October 2001, the Sun Yat-sen University of Medical Sciences was merged into Sun Yat-sen University, and the Center was renamed "Zhongshan Ophthalmic Center of Sun Yat-sen University".

In 2006, the State Key Laboratory of Ophthalmology of the Center officially passed the construction demonstration.

To alleviate the shortage of medical resources, Zhongshan Ophthalmic Center decided to build a new campus in Zhujiang New Town, Guangzhou. The new campus has an investment of 400 million yuan and consists of a 19-story comprehensive medical building and an 8-story comprehensive research building. It covers a land area of 12,329 square meters, with a building area of 43,015 square meters. The project officially broke ground on August 8, 2008. The Zhujiang New Town campus officially opened on May 11, 2018.

In December 2012, the Hainan Eye Hospital of Zhongshan Ophthalmic Center was opened.

In 2023, Zhongshan Ophthalmic Center successfully developed an AI system for infant visual-function screening, and published a paper in Nature Medicine, followed by launching the "mobile clinic + mobile operating room" model in 2024.

In November 2024, the Guangdong-Hong Kong-Macao University Ophthalmology Alliance and the International Center for Ophthalmology were inaugurated at Zhongshan Ophthalmic Center.

In April 2026, Zhongshan Ophthalmic Center officially launched its international eye care services.

== Campuses ==
There are there campuses.

- Ouzhuang Campus (main campus): located at 54 South Xianlie Road, Guangzhou, Guangdong province; Transportation: Ouzhuang Station, Guangzhou Metro Line 5 & 6.
- Zhujiang New Town Campus, with a floor area of about 82,000 square meters: 7 Jinsui Road, Tianhe District, Guangzhou, Guangdong province; Transportation: Yangji East Station, Guangzhou Metro Line 10.
- Hainan Eye Hospital (Hainan Provincial Eye Hospital): No. 19 Xiuhua Road, Xiuying District, Haikou, Hainan, China.

== Other information ==
Zhangshan Ophthalmic Center is the largest eye hospital in China, and the sole eye hospital directly under the National Health Commission. It has 359 employees and covers a land area of over 8,900 square meters, with a floor area of 35,000 square meters. It offer services in more than twenty subspecialities. The annual outpatients volume is over 1,13 million visits with over 78,000 surgeries.

In medical education, Zhongshan Ophthalmic Center has produced more than 2,900 master and doctoral graduates and trained about 20 percent of ophthalmologists in China.

In scientific research, Zhongshan Ophthalmic Center is a national innovation hub for ophthalmology and the largest training base for ophthalmic talent in China. It possesses the only national key laboratory in the field of ophthalmology in China, the "National Key Laboratory of Ophthalmology." The center's research team has achieved, for the first time, the regeneration of physiologically functional solid tissues and organs in the human body, and applied it to the clinical treatment of congenital cataracts, opening up a new direction for stem cell repair of tissues and organs. The hospital published 24 papers listed in Nature Index for the Time frame of 1 June 2025 - 30 May 2026, ranking 284th globally and 117th in China in healthcare.

Zhongshan Ophthalmic Center is the only WHO Collaborating Centre for Eye Health and Vision in China. In 2015, the permanent headquarters and secretariat of the Asia-Pacific Academy of Ophthalmology were established at Zhongshan Ophthalmic Center, making it the first international medical academic organization headquartered in China. In November 2024, the Guangdong-Hong Kong-Macao University Ophthalmology Alliance and the International Center for Ophthalmology were inaugurated at Zhongshan Ophthalmic Center.

The hospital has sent medical teams to help in Vanuatu, Samoa, Fiji, Tonga, the Maldives and Ghana, etc.

In the 2024 China Hospital and Specialty Reputation Ranking, Zhongshan Ophthalmic Center ranked A+ (top-80) in the comprehensive hospital ranking, and 1st in ophthalmology nationally.

== See also ==
- Zhongshan School of Medicine, Sun Yat-sen University
- Sun Yat-sen University
- List of hospitals in China
