= Shandong Provincial Hospital =

Shandong Provincial Hospital (Chinese: 山东省立医院)

Geography
- Location: No. 324, Jingwu Road, Huaiyin District, Jinan, Shandong Province, China

Organisation
- Affiliated university: Shandong First Medical University

Services
- Standards: Grade A tertiary hospital
- Beds: 3,500

History
- Founded: 1897; 129 years ago

Links
- Website: www.sph.com.cn
- Lists: Hospitals in China

Shandong Provincial Hospital is an affiliated hospital of Shandong First Medical University, located in Jinan, capital city of Shandong Province of China. Founded in 1897, the hospital has now developed into a large comprehensive grade A tertiary hospital with more than 3,500 beds, integrating medical treatment, teaching, and scientific research. It is the only medical institution qualified for human organ transplantation in Shandong.

== Historical Development ==
In 1897, the "Association of Nations Love Soldiers Hospital" was founded in Jinan by a German Catholic Church. There were five doctors and nurces.

In 1915, the Japanese seized Shandong, and the hospital was renamed "Qingdao Garrison Ministry of Civil Affairs Ministry of Railways Jinan Hospital" and “Tongren Society Jinan Hospital”.

In 1925, the hospital was renamed "Tongren Jinan Hospital". There were 190 beds and over 160 employees, serving more than 650 outpatients every day.

In 1945, the Chinese government took over the hospital from the Japanese and renamed it "Shandong Provincial Hospital".

In 1948, the hospital was taken over by the People's Liberation Army.

In 1967, the hospital was renamed "Shandong Provincial People's Hospital".

In 1982, the hospital was given another name of "the Red Cross Hospital of Shandong Province" by the Provincial Government.

In 1984, the name of "Shandong Provincial Hospital" was resumed.

In 2003, the Shandong Province Children's Hospital affiliate to Shandong Provincial Hospital was established.

In 2004, the Shandong Provincial Hospital Group was founded based on Shandong Provincial Hospital, including the Shandong EYE & ENT Hospital, Shandong Maternity Hospital, Shandong Imaging Medical Research Institute, Shandong Dongying Hospital, and Shandong Heze Hospital.

In 2007, the nameplate of "Shandong University Affiliated Provincial Hospital" was added.

In 2010, the Shandong Provincial Hospital East Campus was opened.

In 2019, the name of "Shandong First Medical University Affiliated Provincial Hospital" was officially inaugurated.

In 2023, Shandong Provincial Hospital ranked 43rd in the Fudan University China Hospital Ranking.

== Current situation ==
Shandong Provincial Hospital is now a large-scale comprehensive grade A tertiary hospital integrating medical treatment, scientific research, teaching, prevention, healthcare, and rehabilitation.

The hospital consists of two campuses, with over 3,500 beds. Every year, it serves approximately 3.5 millian outpatients visits, performs 69,000 surgeries, and discharges 140,000 patients. The departments of otolaryngology, endocrinology, burns, plastic surgery, and thoracic surgery are on the top tier in China.

The hospital is the sole medical institution in Shandong qualified for human organ transplantation, including kidney, liver, lung, pancreas and small intestine.

The hospital has published over 1000 papers indexed in the SCI and EI, with 65 papers listed in Nature Index for the Time frame of 1 January 2025 - 31 December 2025, ranking 204th globally and 81st in China in healthcare.

Hospital Addresses:

- Central campus: No 324, Jingwu Road, Huaiyin District, Jinan, Shandong Province, China
- East campus: No 9677, Jingshi Road, Lixia District, Jinan, Shandong Province, China

== See also ==
- Shandong First Medical University
- List of hospitals in China
