= First Hospital of Jilin University =

First Hospital of Jilin University 吉林大学第一医院
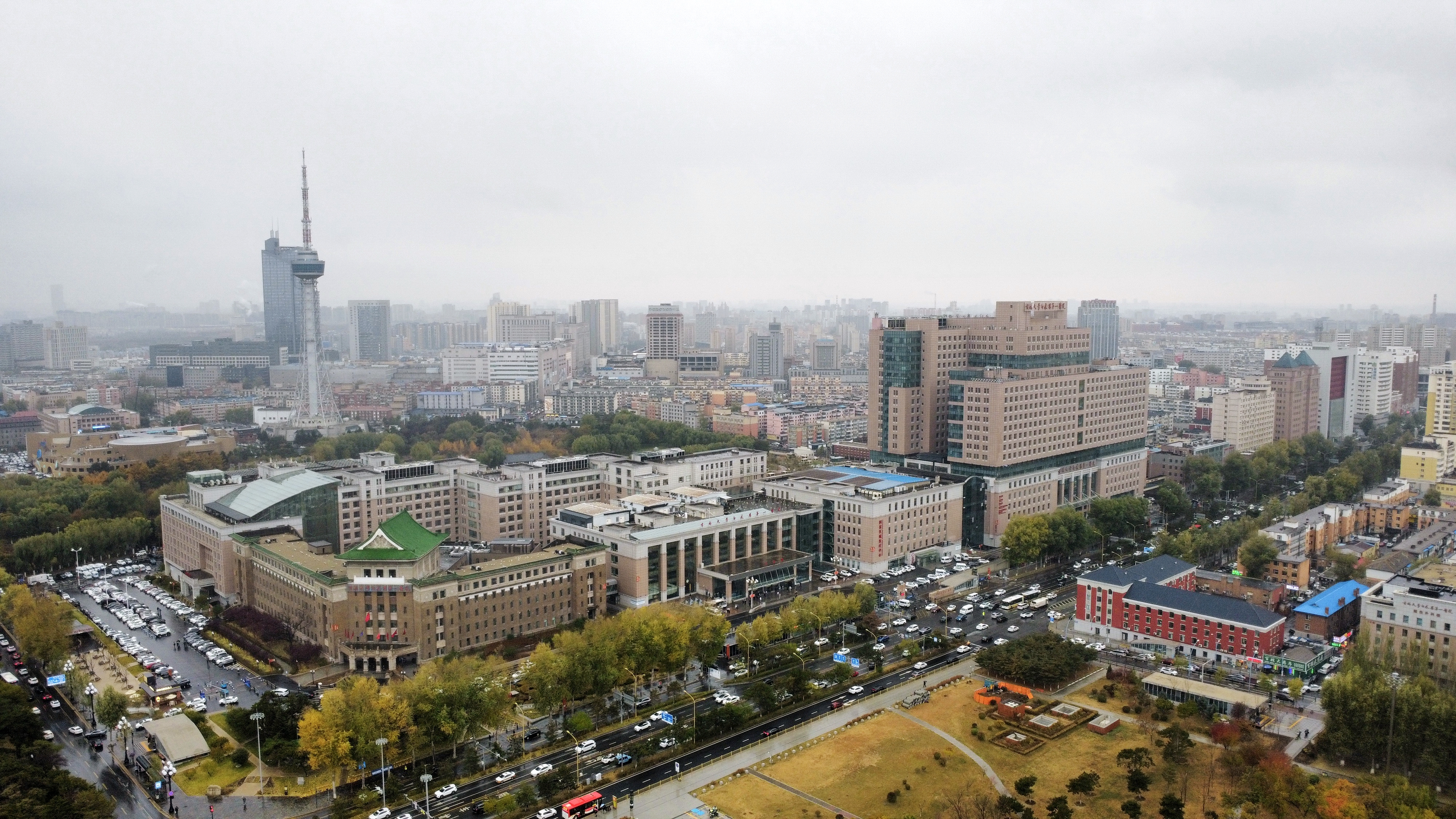
- Aerial view of the main campus of First Hospital of Jilin University

Geography
- Location: No. 71, Xinmin Street, Chaoyang District, Changchun City, Jilin Province, People's Republic of China

Organisation
- Affiliated university: Norman Bethune Health Science Center of Jilin University

Services
- Standards: Grade A tertiary hospital
- Beds: 5900

History
- Founded: 1949; 77 years ago

Links
- Website: www.jdyy.cn

The First Hospital of Jilin University (Chinese: 吉林大学第一医院), full name the First Bethune Hospital of Jilin University, is a grade A tertiary hospital in Changchun, capital city of Jilin Province of China. Founded in 1949, the hospital is now a leading hospital in the province and the First Affiliated Hospital of the Norman Bethune Health Science Center of Jilin University, integrating medical treatment, education and academic research.

== Historical Development ==
In 1949, the Affiliated Hospital of the First Military Medical University of the Chinese People's Liberation Army was established.

In 1978, the hospital was renamed the "First Clinical College of Bethune Medical University".

In 2000, the Bethune Medical University merged with Jilin University, and the hospital was renamed the "First Hospital of Jilin University", or the "First Bethune Hospital of Jilin University".

In 2020, the hospital was listed in the "Outstanding Cases of Smart Hospital Construction Nationwide in 2020".

In the 2023 national performance evaluation of tertiary public hospitals, the First Hospital of Jilin University was promoted to "A++" from "A+", and became a member of the top 1% tier.

In 2024, the Northeast Branch of the National Genomics Data Center of China was established at the First Hospital of Jilin University. In the same year, the hospital became one of the 17 Chinese hospitals with annual revenue exceeding 10 billion Chinese yuan.

In 2025, the hospital established the Center for Obesity Diagnosis and Treatment.

== Current situation ==
The First Hospital of Jilin University is a large grade A tertiary hospital directly under the Ministry of Health, and is responsible for medical treatment, education and academic research, as well as disease prevention and health rehabilitation.

There are two campuses, with a total area of 716,000 square meters, more than 5,900 beds, and more than 9,800 employees. In 2024, the hospital served 5.934 million outpatient visits, 193,000 surgical cases, and discharged 373,000 patients.

The hospital has 123 departments and 96 operation rooms. It is the only hospital in the whole province qualified for organ transplants of liver, kidney, heart, and lung, with the success rate at the forefront nationally.

The First Hospital of Jilin University has published more than 1,486 SCI-indexed articles, and has 94 papers listed in Nature Index for the Time frame of 1 January 2025 - 31 December 2025, ranking 126th globally and 46th in China in healthcare.

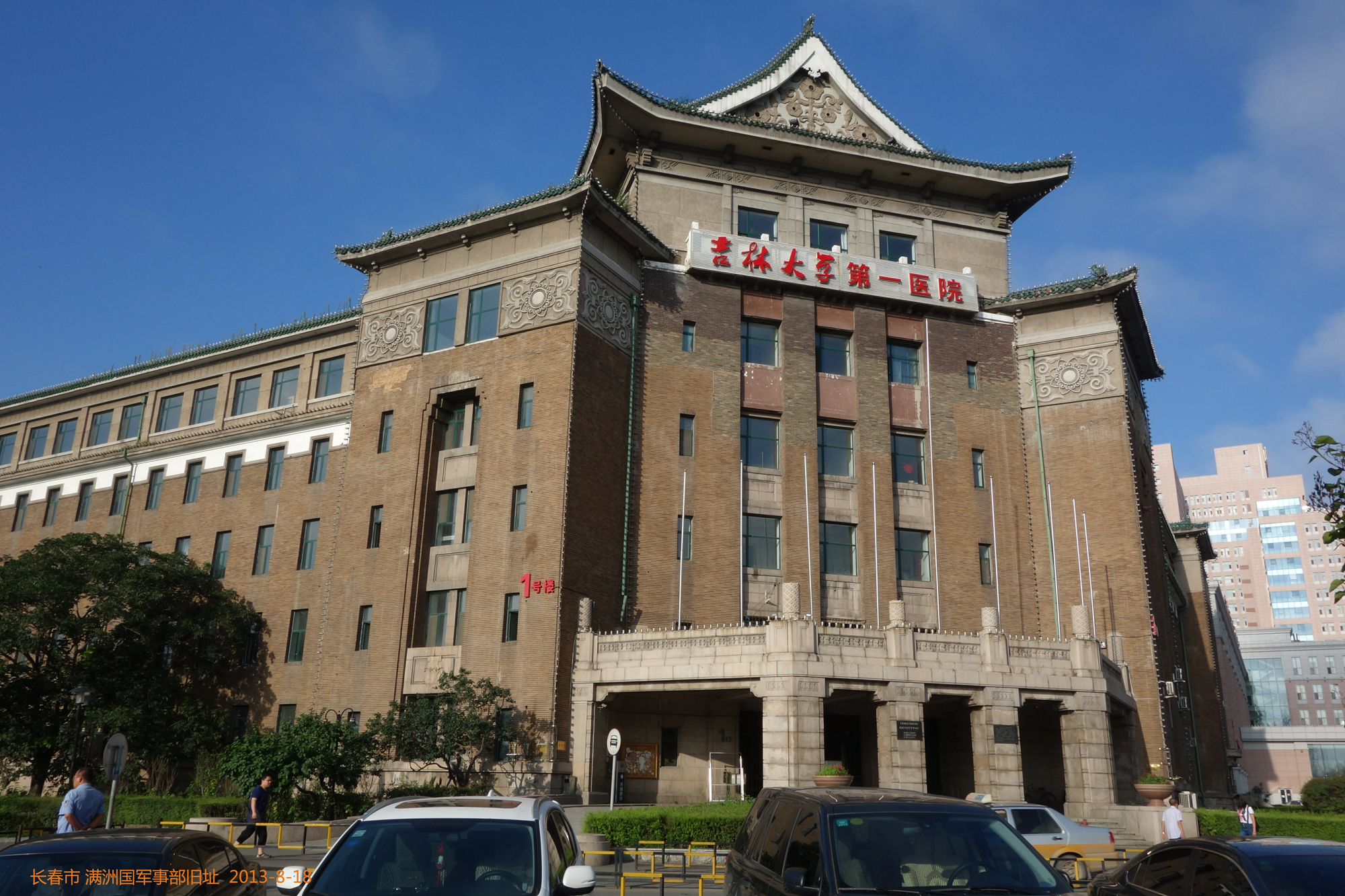
Building 1 (Former Site of the Military Department of the puppet Manchukuo)

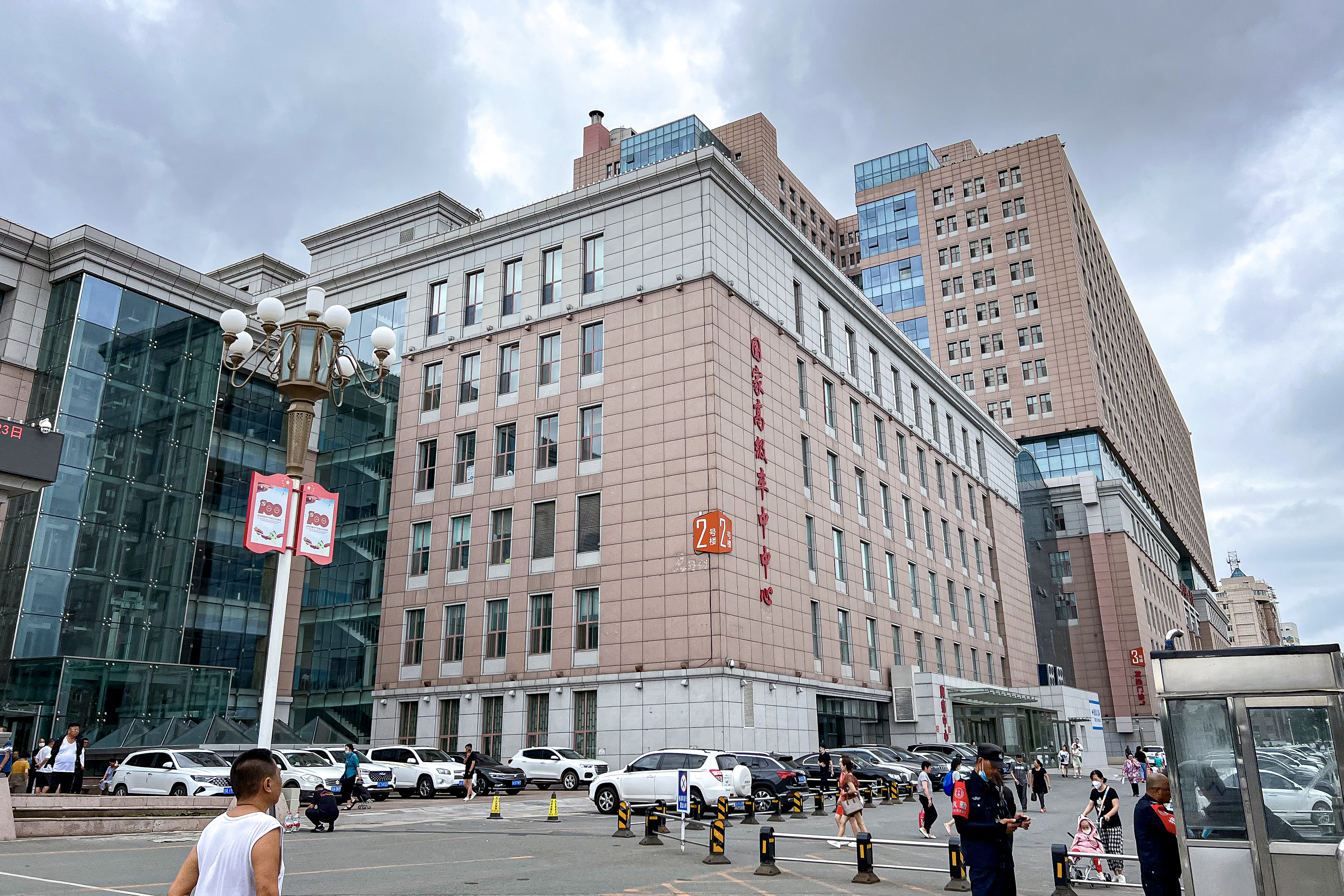
Building 2 (National Advanced Stroke Center)

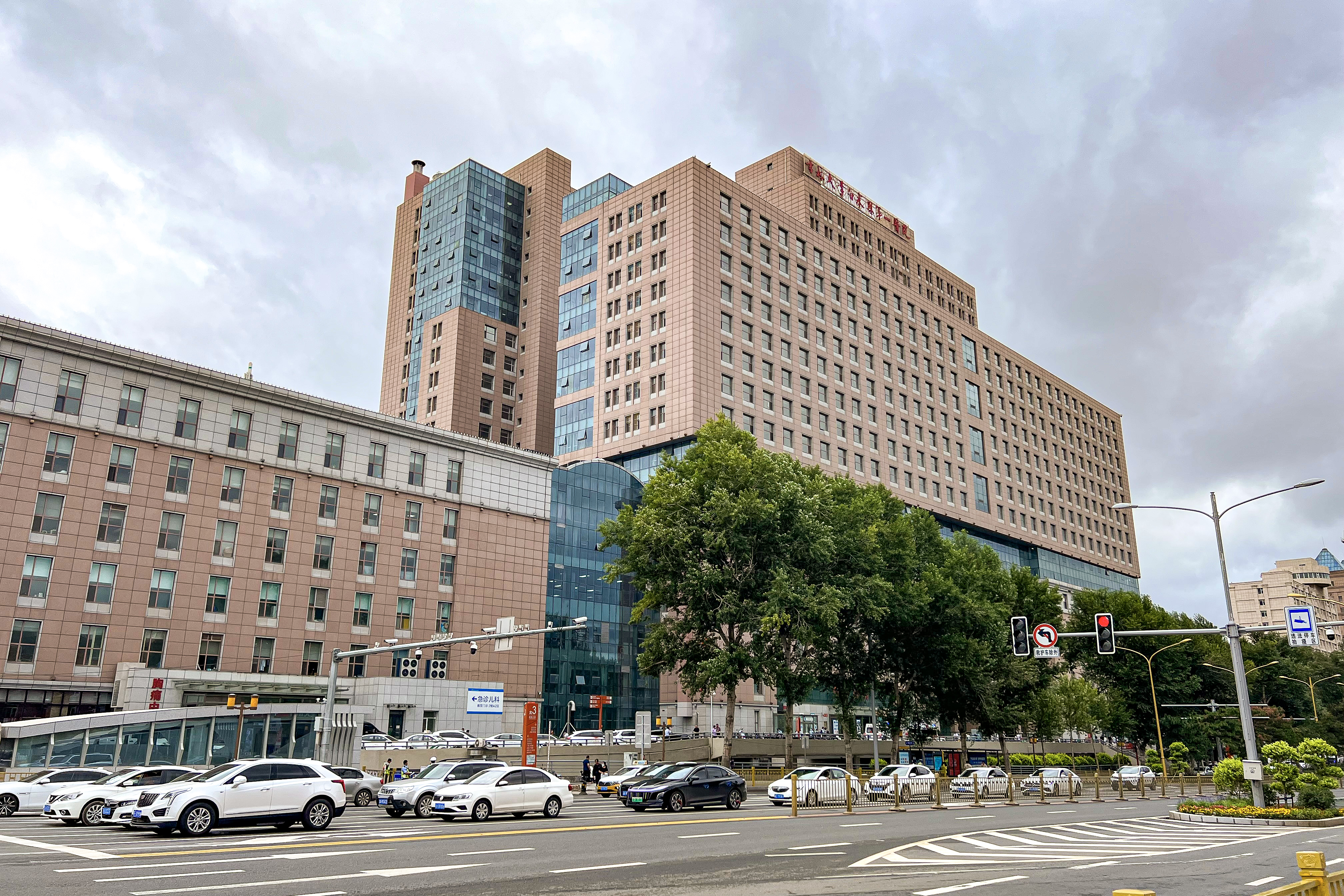
3 (Inpatient Department)

== Contact information ==
Address: 71 Xinmin Street, Changchun, Jilin Province, China.

Buses: Changchun Bus Routes 9, 104, 240, 255, 13, 213, 264, 240, and 276 stop in the surrounding area.

Subway: The Changchun Metro Line 2 Cultural Square Station is located nearby.

== See also ==
- Jilin University
- Norman Bethune Health Science Center of Jilin University
- List of hospitals in China
