= Peking University Shenzhen Hospital =

Peking University Shenzhen Hospital 北京大学深圳医院
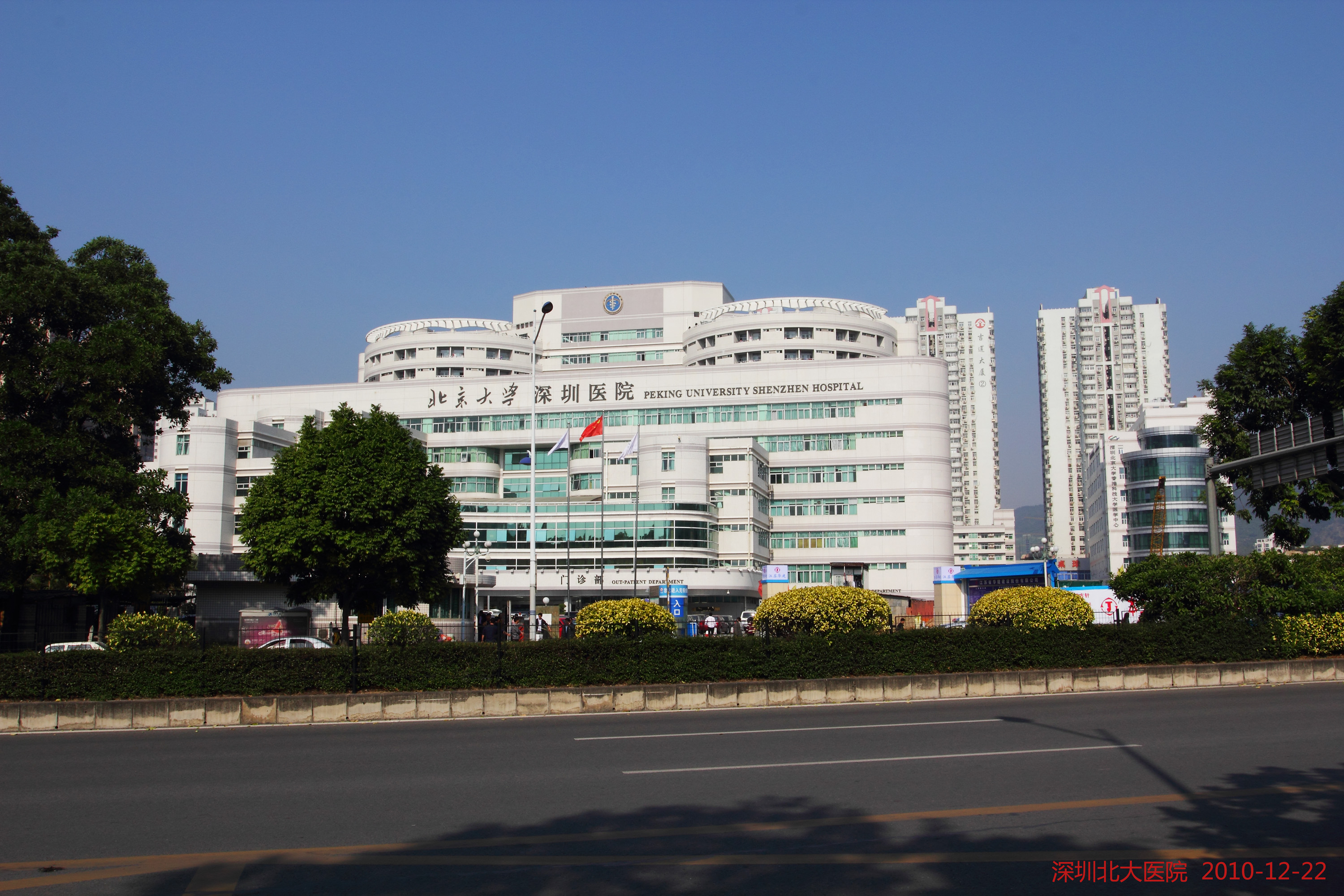
- Peking University Shenzhen Hospital

- Location within China

Geography
- Location: Futian District, Shenzhen, China

Organisation
- Affiliated university: Peking University

Services
- Standards: Grade III Class A hospital
- Emergency department: Yes
- Beds: 1,600

History
- Founded: 1999

Links
- Lists: Hospitals in China

Peking University Shenzhen Hospital (Chinese: 北京大学深圳医院), locally abbreviated as Beida Hospital (北大医院), is a public poly-hospital invested in and built by the Shenzhen Municipal Government. It is a teaching hospital located in the People's Republic of China in Guangdong Shenzhen Futian District. The hospital opened at the end of 1999, originally named "Shenzhen Central Hospital", and changed to its current name in 2000.

The hospital covers an area of 59,000 square meters, with a total floor area of about 220,000 square meters. As of December 31, 2022, the hospital reported 1,851 available beds and 56 clinical and medical technology departments. They plan on adding a north wing (named the Shenzhen Xinhua Hospital) and an east wing (the Shenshan Hospital) with an estimated 5,000 beds.

== History ==
In October 2000, the Shenzhen Municipal Government signed a cooperation agreement with Peking University, after which the hospital was incorporated into the management system of Peking University affiliated hospitals and renamed “Peking University Shenzhen Hospital”. In 2011, the hospital was rated as a Grade III Class A hospital. As of 2016, the hospital had cumulatively served more than 31 million patients. The hospital's outpatient volume has consistently ranked among the highest in Shenzhen, with an average daily outpatient and emergency volume of 8,000 visits, peaking at over 10,000 visits.

== Campuses ==
It has also established the Beida Shenzhen Hospital Shenshan Outpatient Department in the Shenshan Special Cooperation Zone. It began operations in August 2020.

In December 2021, Shenzhen Xinhua Hospital (planned capacity: 2,500 beds) was handed over to PKUSZH for operation and management, and was reported to have been put into use at the end of 2024.
