= First Affiliated Hospital of Chongqing Medical University =

First Affiliated Hospital of Chongqing Medical University (Chinese: 重庆医科大学附属第一医院)

Geography
- Location: Chongqing, China

Organisation
- Type: General, Teaching, Public
- Affiliated university: Chongqing Medical University

Services
- Standards: 3A
- Beds: 4,616

History
- Founded: 1957

Links
- Website: http://www.hospital-cqmu.com/

The First Affiliated Hospital of Chongqing Medical University, also known as the "First Clinical College of Chongqing Medical University", is a large comprehensive hospital located in Chongqing, China. It was founded in 1957, and later became one of the first batch of Grade A tertiary hospitals in the country, integrating medical treatment, education and research.

== History ==
In 1957, the First Affiliated Hospital of Chongqing Medical College was established by the Affiliated Hospital of Shanghai First Medical College (now Fudan University Shanghai Medical College).

In September 1958, the hospital moved to Yuanjiagang, Chongqing.

In 1985, the Chongqing Medical College was renamed "Chongqing Medical University", and the hospital was renamed the "First Affiliated Hospital of Chongqing Medical University".

In 1992, the hospital was listed among the first batch of Grade A tertiary hospitals (shortly, 3A hospitals) in China.

In 1994, The hospital added the nameplate of "Clinical College of Chongqing Medical University".

In 2007, the Cardiovascular and Cerebrovascular Branch of the First Affiliated Hospital of Chongqing Medical University was renamed "Jinshan Hospital".

In 2010, The Eighth People's Hospital of Chongqing was renamed the "First Branch of the First Affiliated Hospital of Chongqing Medical University".

As of 2018, the hospital had 36 clinical departments and 8 medical technology departments, serving 3.4077 million outpatient visits and 3,200 authorized beds.

On September 16, 2025, the First Affiliated Hospital of Chongqing University completed its first adult living-donor assisted liver transplant.

== Current situation ==
The hospital has 59 departments and 4,616 beds. It served approximately 4.125 million outpatients, 208,700 inpatients and 96,000 surgeries in 2024.

The hospital's obstetrics, intensive care, endocrinology, etc. altogether 17 specialties are among the construction projects for national key specialties.

The Chongqing Organ Transplant Center is located in the hospital. It is approved for transplant of kidney, liver, pancreas and small intestine.

In education, the hospital, also known as the "First Clinical College of Chongqing Medical University", trains students at undergraduate, master and doctoral levels.

In scientific research, the First Affiliated Hospital of Chongqing Medical University totally published 117 papers listed in Nature Index for the time period of 1 July 2025 - 30 June 2026, among which 89 were in Health Sciences, ranking 80th globally and 27th in China in healthcare.

In the 2024 China Hospital and Specialty Reputation Ranking, the First Affiliated Hospital of Chongqing Medical University ranked A++ (top-60) in the comprehensive hospital ranking.

The hospital has Yuanjiagang Campus, Jingwei Campus (including Dalitang Campus), Jinshan Campus and Qinggang Campus.

The hospital is located at: 1 Youyi Road, Yuanjiagang, Yuzhong District, Chongqing, China.

== See also ==
- Chongqing Medical University
- List of hospitals in China
