= Third Affiliated Hospital of Xinjiang Medical University =

Geography
- Location: Urumqi, Xinjiang, China

Organisation
- Type: Teaching
- Affiliated university: Xinjiang Medical University

Services
- Emergency department: Yes

History
- Founded: 1989

Links
- Lists: Hospitals in China

The Third Affiliated Hospital of Xinjiang Medical University (Chinese: 新疆医科大学第三附属医院), also known as the Cancer Hospital of Xinjiang Medical University (Chinese: 新疆医科大学肿瘤医院) is a teaching hospital in Urumqi, Xinjiang, China affiliated with Xinjiang Medical University.
