= Hospital for Skin Diseases, CAMS =

Hospital for Skin Diseases & Institute of Dermatology
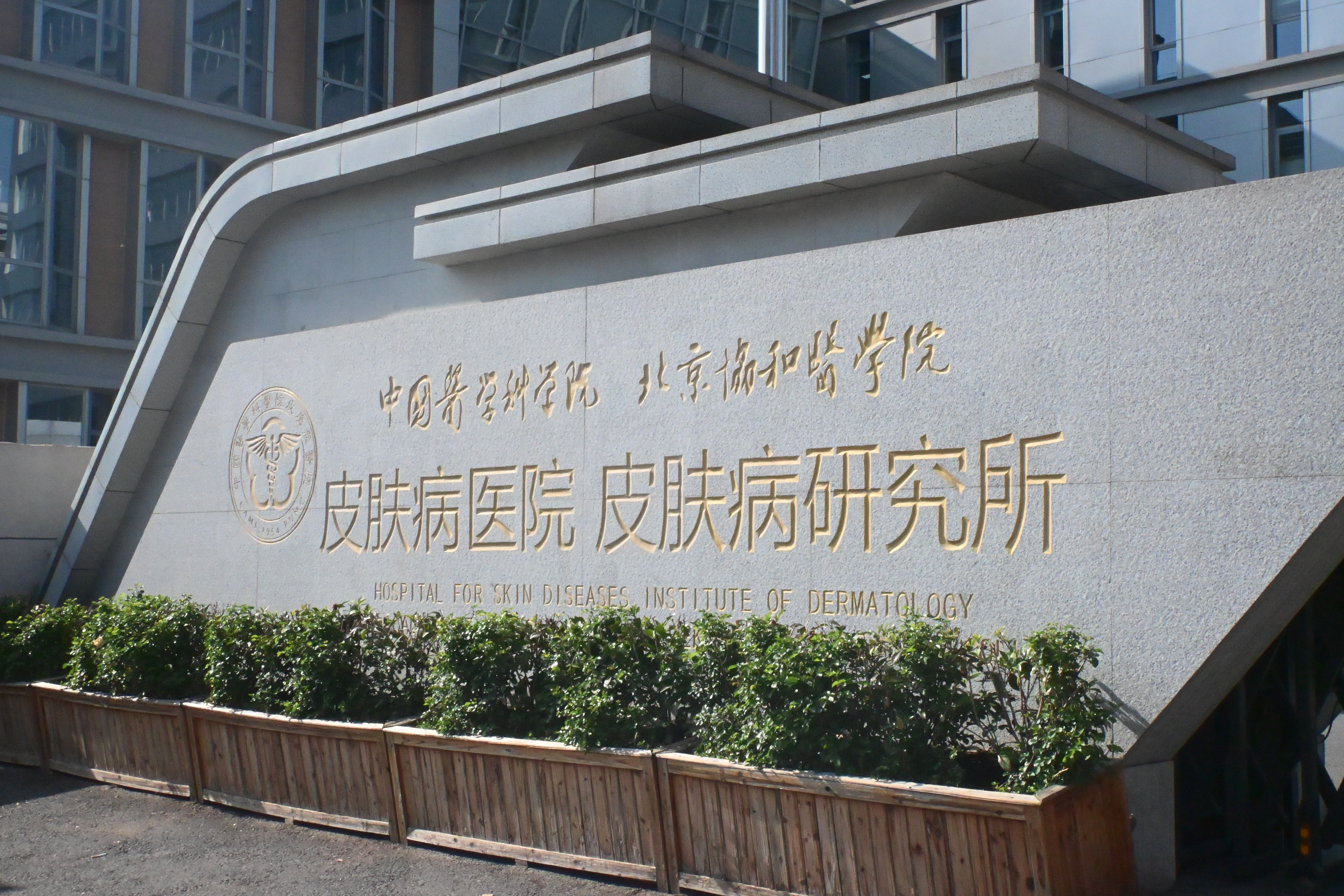

Geography
- Location: No. 12 Jiangwangmiao Street, Xuanwu District, Nanjing, China

Organisation
- Type: 3A specialist hospital
- Affiliated university: Chinese Academy of Medical Sciences

Links
- Website: http://www.pumcskin.cn/
- Lists: Hospitals in China

The Hospital for Skin Diseases, CAMS (Chinese: 中國醫學科學院 皮膚病醫院 ), or Institute of Dermatology, CAMS, is a tertiary hospital of the Chinese Academy of Medical Sciences (CAMS). It was founded as China's first national medical institution for skin diseases in Beijing in 1954, and moved to Nanjing in 1984.

== History ==
In 1954, the Central Skin Disease Institute was established, directly under the leadership of China's Ministry of Health. It was also the earliest national-level medical and research institution for skin diseases.

In 1956, the Institute was renamed "Beijing Skin Disease Institute".

In 1957, it came under the leadership of the Chinese Academy of Medical Sciences, and was renamed "Skin Disease Institute, Chinese Academy of Medical Sciences (CAMS)".

In 1970, the Institute moved to Taizhou of Jiangsu Province.

In 1984, the Skin Disease Institute moved to Nanjing and was formally named "Skin Disease Hospital & Institute, CAMS".

In 1986, the National Center for STD (Sexually Transmitted Disease) Prevention and Control was established in the hospital.

In 2005, the center was reorganized into the national STD Control Center and Leprosy Control Center.

== Present situation ==
The hospital has a total of 480 beds, and a daily outpatient volume of 3000 visits. There are 28 clinical and research departments for Dermatology, Dermatopathology, Mycology, Surgery, Physicotherapeutics, etc.

The hospital is also a WHO Collaborating Center for Prevention and Control of Sexually Transmitted Infections;

The hospital publishes tens of SCI papers annually. It also edits and publishes the Chinese Journal of Dermatology and the International Journal of Dermatology and Venereology in English.

== See also ==
- Chinese Academy of Medical Sciences
- List of hospitals in China
