= Tianjin Medical University General Hospital =

Hospital in Tianjin, China

Tianjin Medical University General Hospital (Chinese: 天津医科大学总医院) is a general hospital in the central Heping District of the Chinese metropolis of Tianjin, associated with Tianjin Medical University.
