= Women's Hospital, Zhejiang University =

Women's hospital in Hangzhou, China

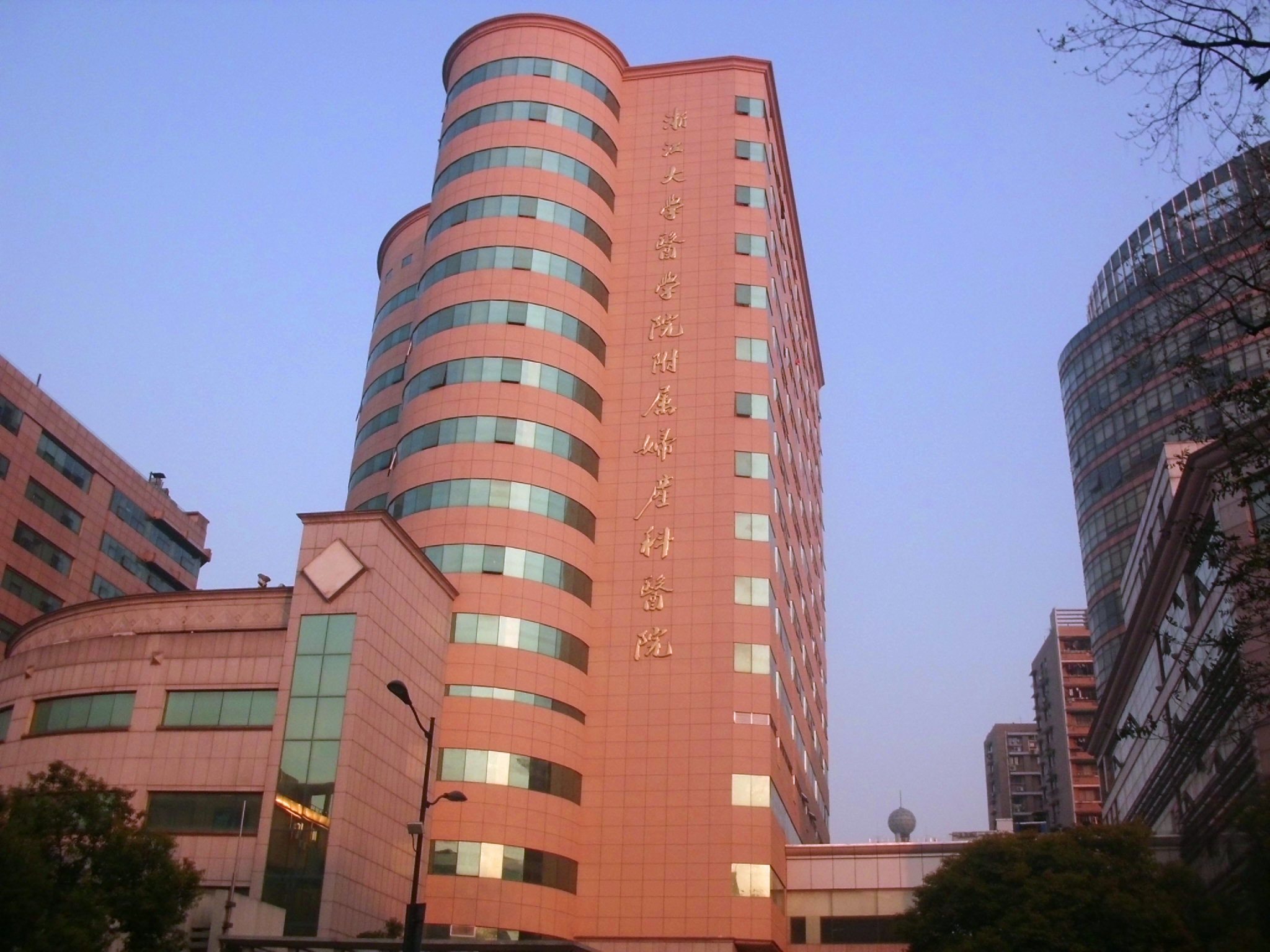

The Women's Hospital of the Zhejiang University School of Medicine (浙江大学医学院附属妇产科医院) is a hospital specialized for women in Hangzhou, Zhejiang, China

== History ==
It is a university hospital affiliated to the School of Medicine, Zhejiang University. Previously, the hospital was known as the Zhejiang Women's Hospital (Traditional Chinese: 浙江省婦女醫院/浙江省婦女保健院; Simplified Chinese: 浙江省妇女医院/浙江省妇女保健院).

It was founded in 1951, just after the Chinese Civil War, to fit the local health care demand for women and babies. Currently the hospital has nearly 1000 staff members including about 130 experts and academic faculty. It has about 750 normal beds and about 200 baby beds.
