= Clifford Hospital =

Geography
- Location: Guangzhou, Guangdong, China

Organisation
- Care system: Private
- Type: District General

Services
- Standards: China's Level A Tertiary Hospital
- Emergency department: Yes
- Beds: 600

History
- Founded: 2001

Links
- Website: http://www.cliffordhospital.com

Clifford Hospital
- Traditional Chinese: 祈福醫院
- Simplified Chinese: 祈福医院
Transcriptions
Standard Mandarin
- Hanyu Pinyin: Qífú Yīyuàn
Yue: Cantonese
- Jyutping: kei4 fuk1 ji1 jyun6*2

Clifford Hospital (Chinese: 祈福医院) is a hospital in Panyu District, Guangzhou, Guangdong, China.

Founded in 2001, it is the first hospital in China accredited by Joint Commission International (JCI). and it has been awarded China's Level A Tertiary Hospital. Clifford Hospital covers an area of 90,000 square meters and has the capacity of 600 inpatients. It serves 3,000 outpatients per day. The phase II building of Clifford Hospital has been officially put into operation with the investment about two billion yuan on Oct.26,2017. With newly added 1500 inpatient beds, the total number of inpatient beds increased to 2100 and will increase to 3000 in the future. Clifford Hospital is an integrated general hospital with outpatient and inpatient departments and emergency unit. It has more than 40 clinical and technical departments. Clifford Hospital presents a hotel-like environment which complies with international hospital management standards. Clifford Hospital utilizes state-of -the-art medical technologies and equipment, staffed by more than 1,000 health care professionals. Patient from over 120 countries have visited Clifford Hospital for treatment and preventive health care. Clifford hospital has nearly 20 years' experience in providing health care for domestic patients in China mainland and foreign patients.
