= Nanjing General Military Hospital =

Hospital in Nanjing, China

The Nanjing General Military Hospital is housed in buildings, twin towers, which originally served as the Central Hospital of Nanjing during the Kuomintang government. Central Hospital was constructed in 1929. One of the towers houses the Research Institute of Nephrology while the other is home to the Research Institute of General Surgery.

During the Battle of Nanking in 1937, the Central Hospital of Nanjing was the target of Japanese bombs despite having a large red cross painted on its roof.

== See also ==
- Battle of Nanking
