= Shenzhen People's Hospital =

Shenzhen People's Hospital 深圳市人民醫院

Geography
- Location: Liuyi Department: Dongmen North Road 1017, Luohu District, Shenzhen, China; First Outpatient Department: Shennan East Road 3046, Luohu District, Shenzhen, Longhua Branch: Longguan East Road 101, Longhua District, Shenzhen

Services
- Beds: 3085

History
- Founded: 1946

Links
- Website: https://www.szhospital.com/

Shenzhen People's Hospital (Traditional Chinese: 深圳市人民醫院; Simplified Chinese: 深圳市人民医院). The hospital is the oldest hospital in modern Shenzhen and a Chinese national Tertiary A (Grade III Class A) hospital. It was founded in 1946 and renamed to its current name in 1979. The hospital is a non-directly affiliated teaching hospital of Jinan University and a directly affiliated hospital of Southern University of Science and Technology.

It currently has four major campuses: the First Outpatient Department (locally known as the "门诊部"), the Liuyi Department and Second Outpatient Department (locally known as the "留醫部"), the Longhua Branch, and the Bantian Campus. The Liuyi Department is the main campus, located at Dongmen North Road 1017, Luohu District; the First Outpatient Department is located at Shennan East Road 3046 in Luohu District; the Longhua Branch is located at 101 Longguan East Road, Longhua Subdistrict, Longhua District; and the Bantian Campus is located in Bantian Subdistrict, Longgang District. The hospital covers a total land area of 132,700 square meters, with a floor area of 477,400 square meters, and has 3,085 open beds in total.

== History ==
Shenzhen People's Hospital was founded in 1946. Its predecessor was the Bao'an County Health Center, which was originally located together with the county government in Nantou. At that time, the hospital site was in an temple with rudimentary conditions.

In December 1953, it moved with the county government to Caiwuwei Village in Shenzhen Town. At that time, the hospital had only a single small Western-style building, only 23 beds, and only 40 medical staff. It was later renamed Bao'an County People's Hospital.

== Transportation ==
=== Liuyi Department ===
==== Metro ====
- Shenzhen Metro: Cuizhu Station

==== Bus ====
At the Liuyi Department, public bus routes serving the hospital include 3, 64, 113, 211, 306, 333, 351, M102, M103, M199, M348, M399, M407, M437, M508, M526, and E11.

Nearby, the Cuizhuyuan stop is served by bus routes 2, 57, 62, 83, 107, 203, 333, M348, and M482.

=== First Outpatient Department ===
==== Metro ====
- Shenzhen Metro: Laojie Station

==== Bus ====
For the First Outpatient Department, bus routes stopping at “Outpatient Department Stop 1” include 10, 29, 85, 104, 223, M103, M133, M190, and M191.

Bus routes stopping at “Outpatient Department Stop 2” include 113, 203, 312, and M156.

=== Longhua Branch ===
==== Bus ====
For the Longhua Branch, bus routes serving the “People's Hospital Longhua Branch” stop include 312, 624, 882, M112, M152, M199, M263, M269, M282, M354, M378, M392, M401, M424, M503, M538, M548, E36, E37, E40, and B920.
