= Jiangsu Provincial Hospital of Chinese Medicine =

Jiangsu Provincial Hospital of Chinese Medicine (Chinese: 江蘇省中醫院)

Geography
- Location: No. 155, Hanzhong Road, Qinhuai District, Nanjing, China

Organisation
- Type: General, Public, 3A
- Affiliated university: Nanjing University of Chinese Medicine

Services
- Emergency department: Yes
- Beds: 3,000+

Helipads
- Helipad: Yes

History
- Founded: 1954

Links
- Website: http://www.jshtcm.com

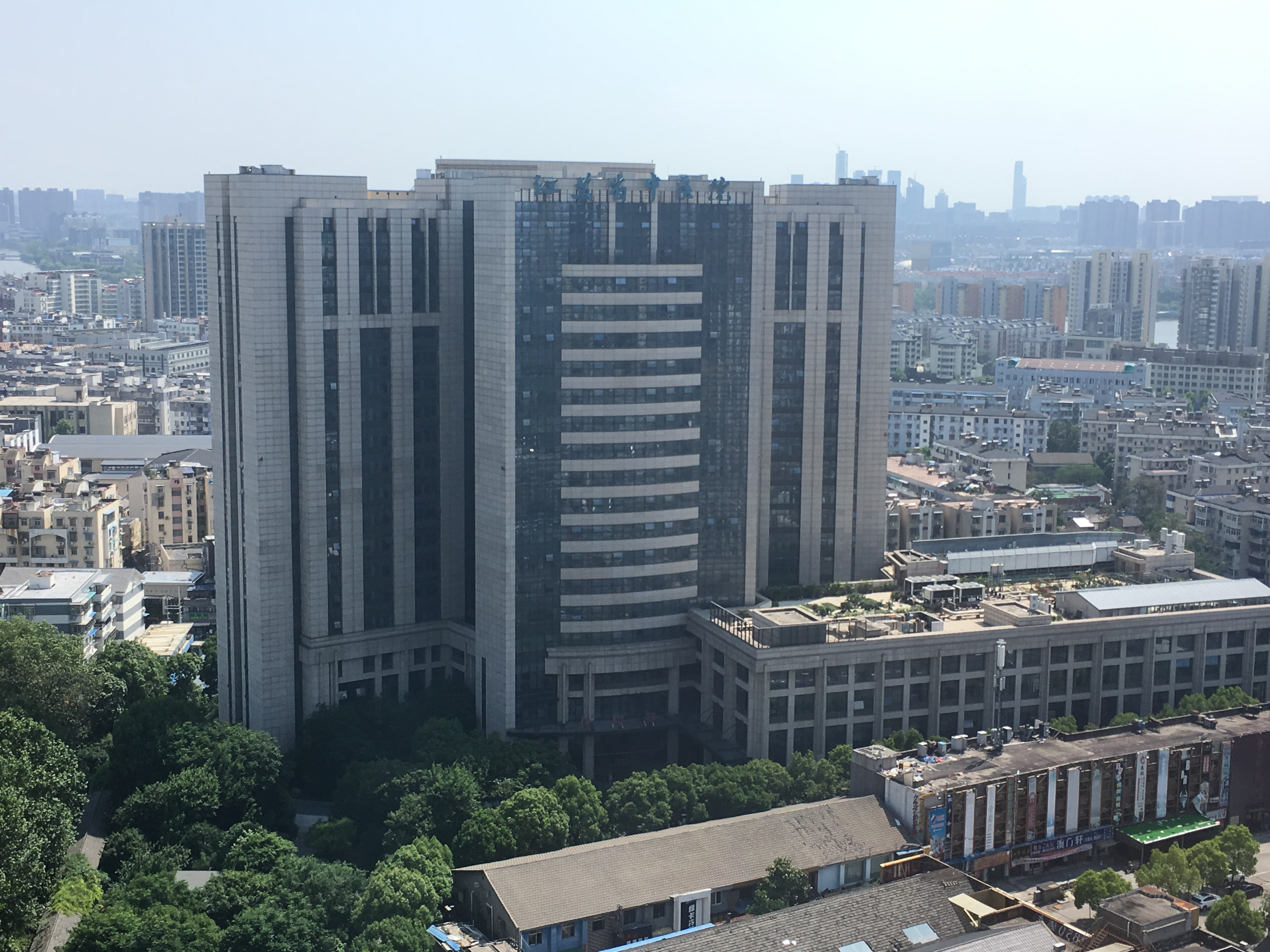

The Jiangsu Provincial Hospital of Chinese Medicine, or "Jiangsu Province Hospital of Chinese Medicine", is the Affiliated Hospital of Nanjing University of Chinese Medicine located in Nanjing, Jiangsu Province of China. Founded in 1954, the hospital has developed into a large 3A hospital of Traditional Chinese Medicine (TCM), integrating medical treatment, education and research.

== History ==
Jiangsu Provincial Hospital of Chinese Medicine was founded in October, 1954, as one of the earliest provincial-level TCM hospitals established in China. Its first president was Ye Juquan (an academician of the Chinese Academy of Sciences and a famous TCM doctor), personally oppointted by Premior Zhou Enlai. The outpatient department consisted of three small buildings and several bungalows.

In 1958, the hospital was renamed the "Affiliated Hospital of Nanjing College of Chinese Medicine".

In 1978, the hospital was designated as a national training base for clinical Chinese medicine by the Ministry of Health.

In the 1970s, the research project "Clinical and Experimental Study on the Treatment of Epidemic Hemorrhagic Fever with Traditional Chinese Medicine" won the first prize of the Science and Technology Progress Award of Traditional Chinese Medicine from the State Administration of Traditional Chinese Medicine.

In 2011, the hospital won the first prize of the Jiangsu Provincial Science Technology Award for their project "Innovative Theory Clinical Application of Traditional Chinese Medicine in Female Reproductive Rhythms".

In 2020, the hospital again won the first prize of the Jiangsu Provincial Science Technology Award, for their research on "Translational Applications of Traditional Chinese Medicine in the Prevention Treatment of Major Chronic Disease-Related Kidney Damage".

In 2022, the hospital's Zidong Campus and Zhongshan Campus were opened.

In 2024, the Jiangning Campus became fully operational.

In 2025, the hospital was selected as a national Standardization Research and Transformation Center for Traditional Chinese Medicine.

== Current status ==
Jiangsu Provincial Hospital of Chinese Medicine is now a large 3A hospital of Chinese Medicine, with 46 departments, 5,600 staff members and 3,300 beds. The outpatient and emergency services reached 7,320,000 visits in the year 2023.

There are six national key specialties, including Pediatrics, Emergency, Gastropathy and Splenopathy, Otolaryngology, Nephrology, and Nursing; as well as 12 key specialties commissioned by the State Administration of Traditional Chinese Medicine.

The hospital has developed over 140 kinds of hospital preparations from over 20 formulations.

The hospital has successively won the titles of National Provincial Model Traditional Chinese Medicine Hospital, National "Top 100 Hospitals", and National Advanced Unit for Hospital Culture Construction.

Jiangsu Provincial Hospital of Chinese Medicine has ranked A+ in the National Tertiary Public Traditional Chinese Medicine Hospital Performance Appraisal for five years.

The hospital published 10 papers listed in Nature Index for the Time frame of 1 February 2025 - 31 January 2026, ranking 643rd globally and 234th in China.

Hospital location:

- Headquarter: No.155, Hanzhong Road, Qinhuai District, Nanjing, Jiangsu Province, China
- Zidong Campus: No. 200, Xianlin Avenue, Qixia District, Nanjing City
- Jiangning Campus: No. 99, Niushou Avenue, Jiangning District, Nanjing City
- Zhongshan Campus: No.11, Zhongshan Mausoleum, Xuanwu District, Nanjing City.

== See also ==
Nanjing University of Chinese Medicine
