= Tianjin Fourth Central Hospital =

Healthcare organization in Tianjin, China

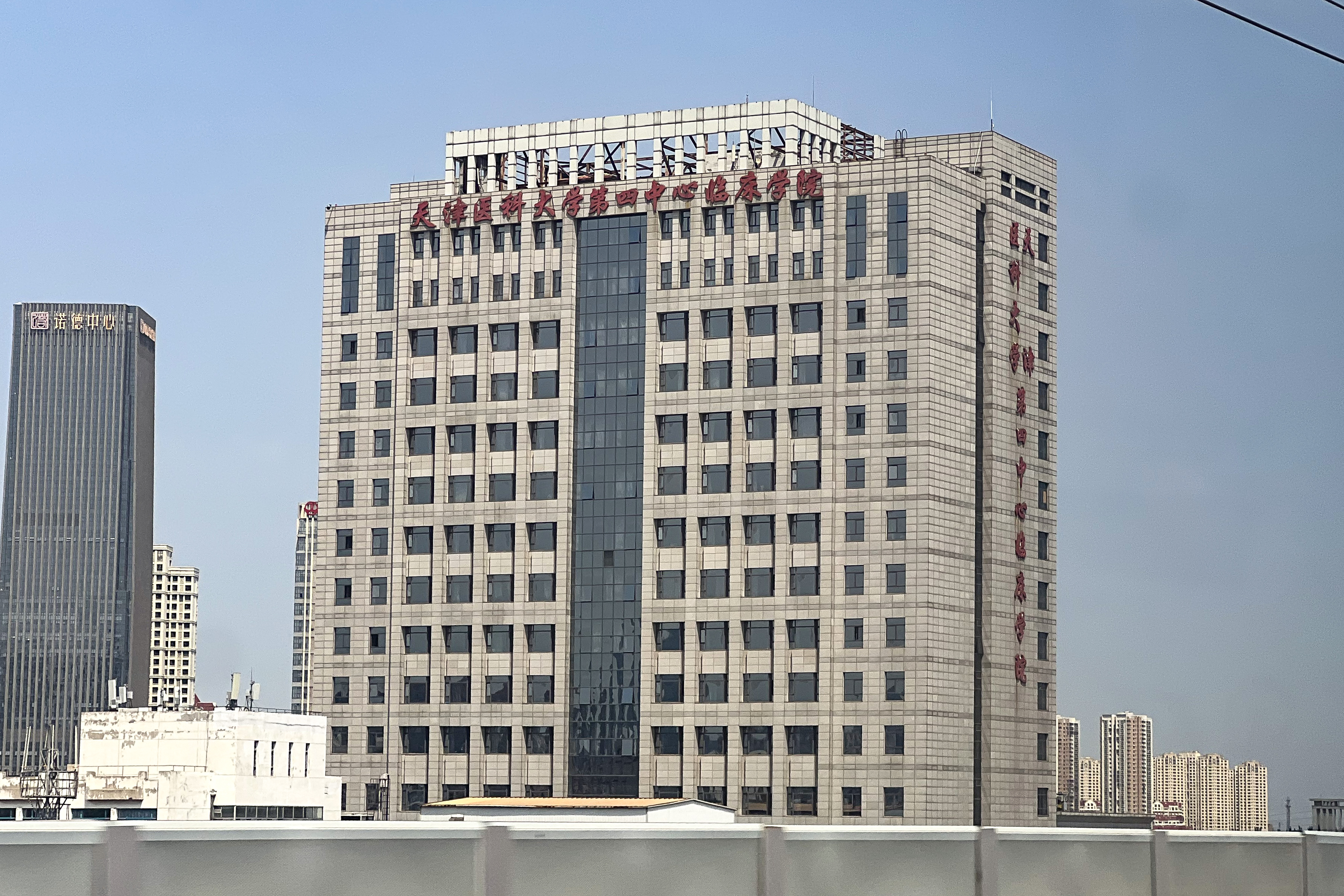
Tianjin Fourth Central Hospital

Tianjin Fourth Central Hospital, also known as the Nankai University Affiliated Fourth Central Hospital and the Tianjin Medical University Fourth Central Clinical College, was originally established in February 1930 as the Beining Railway Tianjin Hospital. It is located at No. 1 Zhongshan Road, Hebei District, Tianjin, southwest of Tianjin North Station. In September 1949, Beining Railway Tianjin Hospital was renamed the Tianjin Railway Central Hospital. In September 1999, the hospital added the name plate of Tianjin Fourth Central Hospital. On August 23, 2004, the hospital was transferred from the Beijing Railway Bureau to the jurisdiction of the Tianjin Municipal Health Bureau.

== See also ==
- Nankai University
- Tianjin Medical University
