= Hospital of the Chengdu University of Traditional Chinese Medicine =

Hospital in Chengdu, China

The Hospital of the Chengdu University of Traditional Chinese Medicine (成都中医药大学附属医院), also known as Sichuan Provincial Hospital of Chinese Medicine (四川省中医医院), is a public hospital of Traditional Chinese medicine in Chengdu, Sichuan, China. It is affiliated with the Chengdu University of Traditional Chinese Medicine.

Founded in 1957 as one of the earliest teaching hospital of Chinese medicine colleges in the People's Republic of China, the hospital is now a Grade A tertiary hospital of over 3,000 beds, responsible for medical treatment, education and research.

== History ==
In 1957, the "Affiliated Hospital of Chengdu College of Traditional Chinese Medicine" was established in Chengdu, capital of Sichuan Province. It was one of the four earliest TCM college hospitals in China.

In 1995, the college as renamed "Chengdu University of Traditional Chinese Medicine", and the hospital the "Hospital of Chengdu University of Traditional Chinese Medicine".

In 2001, the hospital was named the "Sichuan Provincial Hospital of Chinese Medicine".

In 2021, the Traditional Chinese Medicine Diagnosis and Treatment (Li Zhongyu's Pestle and Needle Therapy) of the Hospital of Chengdu University of Traditional Chinese Medicine became a National Intangible Cultural Heritage protection unit.

In 2022, the hospital was selected as a National Regional Medical Center Export Hospital

In 2025, the hospital was selected as a national Standardization Research and Transformation Center for Traditional Chinese Medicine.

== Current situation ==
The Hospital of Chengdu University of Traditional Chinese Medicine is now a Grade A tertiary hospital integrating medical treatment, teaching, scientific research, prevention, healthcare, and rehabilitation.

The hospital is a National TCM Clinical Research Base, National Regional Medical Center Export Hospital, National High Level TCM Talents’ Training Base, and TCM International Cooperation Base; and boasts several national clinical key specialties, including acupuncture, gynecology and nephrology.

As of 2021, there are over 2,000 employees, 45 clinical departments, 3,000 patient beds, with 2.7 million outpatient visits annually.

The hospital has built a TCM Pharmacy with a daily prescription of 30,000 Chinese medicines.

As the primary teaching hospital for Chengdu University of Traditional Chinese Medicine, the hospital is responsible for teaching and training of undergraduate students, postgraduate students, overseas students and the residents.

The hospital has published over 1,000 research papers, including 11 papers listed in Nature Index for the time frame of 1 February 2025 - 31 January 2026, ranking 592nd globally and 213rd in China.

== Sichuan Provincial Acupuncture School ==
The Hospital of Chengdu University of Traditional Chinese Medicine also hosts the Sichuan Provincial Acupuncture School, a secondary vocational school specializing in Traditional Chinese Medicine. There are over 8,000 students on campus.

== See also ==
- Chengdu University of Traditional Chinese Medicine
- West China Hospital of Sichuan University
