= List of hospitals in Beijing =

This is a list of hospitals in Beijing.

- 301 Hospital
- 302 Hospital
- 307 Hospital
- Aerospace Center Hospital
- Amcare Women and Children Hospital
- Arrail Dental Clinic
- APMG Puhua International Hospitals - Shuangjing
- APMG Puhua International Hospitals - Temple of Heaven
- Beijing 21st Century Hospital
- Beijing An-ding Hospital
- Beijing Anzhen Hospital
- Beijing Buwai Hospital
- Beijing Chaoyang Hospital
- Beijing Chaoyang An-yuan Hospital of Traditional Chinese Medicine
- Beijing Chaoyang Dongba Hospital
- Beijing Chaoyang Guanzhuang Hospital
- Beijing Chaoyang Hospital of Traditional Chinese Medicine
- Beijing Chaoyang Huagonglu Hospital
- Beijing Chaoyang Huizhong Hospital
- Beijing Chaoyang Jingsong Hospital
- Beijing Chaoyang No. 2 Hospital
- Beijing Chaoyang Wali Hospital
- Beijing Chaoyang Women and Children's Healthcare Center
- Beijing Chaoyang Xiaohongmeng Hospital
- Beijing Charity Hospital
- Beijing Children's Hospital
- Beijing Chi Kang Hospital
- Beijing Chongwen Children's Hospital
- Beijing Chongwen Guangming Hospital
- Beijing Chongwen Hospital of Traditional Chinese Medicine
- Beijing Chongwen Mouchun Hospital
- Beijing Chongwen No. 1 People's Hospital
- Beijing Chongwen Stomatological Hospital
- Beijing Chongwen Zhengda Hospital
- Beijing Communication Hospital of the Ministry of Communication
- Beijing Construction Workers Hospital
- Beijing Ditan Hospital
- Beijing Erlong Road Hospital
- Beijing Friendship Hospital
- Beijing Fulong Hospital
- Beijing Fuxing Hospital
- Beijing Geriatric Hospital
- Beijing Gulou Hospital of Traditional Chinese Medicine
- Beijing Guotai Hospital
- Beijing Hepingli Hospital
- Beijing Hospital
- Beijing Stomatological Hospital|Beijing Hospital for Stomatology
- Beijing Hospital of Traditional Chinese Medicine
- Beijing Huguoshi Hospital of Traditional Chinese Medicine
- Beijing Huiming Hospital
- Beijing Intech Eye Hospital
- Beijing Jingcheng Dermatopathy Hospital
- Beijing Jishuitan Hospital
- Beijing Massage Hospital
- Beijing Maternity Hospital
- Beijing New Century International Hospital for Children
- Beijing No. 1 Hospital affiliated to Beijing Medical University
- Beijing No. 2 Hospital
- Beijing No. 6 Hospital
- Beijing Police Hospital
- Beijing Post Hospital
- Beijing Puren Hospital
- Beijing Qing Gong Hospital
- Beijing Royal Integrative Medicine Hospital, Chanping District
- Beijing Shunyi Hospital
- Beijing Tiantan Hospital
- Beijing Tibet Hospital
- Beijing Tongren Hospital
- Beijing United Family Hospital and Clinics
- Beijing University International Hospital
- Beijing Wan Jie Hospital
- Beijing Xuanwu Baizhifan Hospital
- Beijing Xuanwu Chunshu Hospital
- Beijing Xuanwu Dazhalan Hospital
- Beijing Xuanwu Guangwai Hospital
- Beijing Xuanwu Guangnei Hospital
- Beijing Xuanwu Hospital of Traditional Chinese Medicine
- Beijing Xuanwu Taoranting Hospital
- Beijing Xuanwu Tianqiao Hospital
- Bethune International Peace Hospital
- Changyang Hospital
- China Rehabilitation Research Center
- CMU Beijing Chaoyang Hospital
- CMU Beijing Fuwai Hospital (Cardiovascular disease)
- CMU Beijing Fuxing Hospital (Capital Medical University)
- China-Japan Friendship Hospital
- DongFang Hospital
- East Area Hospital of Beijing Chaoyang Red Cross
- Eastern Hospital of Beijing - Eastern Hospital of Beijing Traditional Chinese Medical University
- Fuwai Hospital & Cardiovascular Institute
- General Hospital of Chinese People's Armed Police Forces
- General Hospital of the Chinese People's Liberation Army
- Guang An Men's Hospital
- Haidian Changquing Hospital of Beijing
- Jihua Hospital
- OASIS International Hospital
- Orient Hospital
- Peking Union Medical College Hospital
- People's Hospital Affiliated to Beijing Medical University
- Peking University Hospital of Stomatology
- PKU 3rd People's Hospital
- PKU 6th Hospital (Mental Care)
- PKU Hospital
- PKU Oral Care Hospital
- Puhua International Hospital and Clinics
- Red Cross Chaoyang Hospital affiliated to Capital Medical University
- Sanfine International Hospital
- Sekwa Eye Hospital, Beijing SEH
- St. Andrew's Hospital, Beijing
- St. Barnabas's Hospital in Beijing
- St. Stephen's Hospital in Beijing
- Sekwa Eye Hospital
- Shuguang Hospital of Beijing Chaoyang Red Cross
- SK Hospital
- Xinhua Hospital of Beijing Red Cross
- Xuanwu Hospital of Capital Medical University
  - Department of Neurology
- Xiaotangshan Hospital
