= International clinics in Beijing =

"International clinic" is a colloquial term used by expats in China for a privately owned clinic or hospital that possesses specific characteristics, which separates it from the various domestic healthcare establishments. International clinics are generally much more expensive than public hospitals and will be able to accept non-Chinese insurance. In Beijing, there are a number of such companies, the most prominent being Puhua International Hospital - Shuangjing, Beijing United Family Hospital and International SOS.

== Background ==
Private medical institutions outside of Traditional Chinese Medicine clinics is a relatively new concept in China with healthcare being synonymous with large public hospitals. Beijing boasts some of the most famous and well reputed medical facilities such as the Xie He, Chaoyang and Tiantan Hospitals.

For expats, the accessibility of these services are limited due to language barriers and a gap between what is given and what is expected of a hospital by western standards. Public hospitals require patients to first take a number (Gua hao), following which they will normally wait several hours to see a doctor. Consultations are generally very short and many expat patients can be surprised at the level of customer service available.

International clinics will offer a similar level of service as one might expect from a private clinic in Europe or the United States and as such is the primary choice of expats in Beijing, particularly those with international health insurance.

== General characteristics ==
There are a number of common traits that an organization must possess to be considered an International Clinic. An organization does not need to necessarily have all of them to qualify. The most apparent traits are:

- Non-Chinese Doctors: International Clinics will tend to have several foreign doctors who will either serve as management or as specialists in specialties which may be under represented or developed in Chinese medical education. These doctors will generally come from many countries around the world and speak a variety of languages, though it is rare that they speak Chinese. To practice in China, they need a medical license in their own country as well as China.
- English Speaking Chinese Doctors: Due to the difficulty in recruiting foreign doctors in China, a large number of the medical staff in an international clinic will still be Chinese. General practitioners will speak English fluently as well as some specialists. However, due to the number of specialties that many international clinics offer, many of their Chinese doctors are part-time and may be on loan from Chinese hospitals. In these situations, they normally have little to no English ability.
- English Speaking Nurses: Most if not all nurses in International Clinics will speak English, with many having worked abroad. Nurses will generally act as the primary translators for Non-English speaking doctors.
- Multi-Lingual Customer service: Most International Clinics will have a team of customer service professionals who speak a host of different languages to aid in communication. Some clinics will choose to specialize in certain nationalities, particularly those with close knit communities.
- Foreign Ownership: Most International Clinics will either be owned by a non-Chinese parent company or be a joint venture with a Chinese company. Management can vary from Chinese to Foreign depending on the clinic.
- Direct Billing with International insurance providers: Most International Clinics will have these systems in place so as to allow patients to claim directly without the need to pay up front and later claim back.

== Prominent international clinics and hospitals in Beijing ==
=== Puhua International Hospital ===
Puhua International Hospital - Shuangjing is located in the Central Business District(CBD) of Beijing, this clinic offers outpatient services to complement the full service Puhua hospital near Temple of Heaven. This clinic is well known for its focus on specialist areas and is famous for orthopedics, neurology, chiropractic, pediatrics and gynecology. They have many foreign doctors and most of the staff is fluent in English.

=== Beijing United Family Hospital ===
Beijing United Family Hospital is located in the north east of Beijing, UFH is one of the larger international hospitals with clinics around the city. It is known as the first full-service international hospital established in Beijing but also as the most expensive. It boasts the largest staff roster with many famous Chinese specialists working part-time. UFH also has many expatriate doctors as well as the highest English speaking staff ratio.

=== International SOS Clinic ===
International SOS is primarily a medical evacuation and insurance company but have opened outpatient clinics in several cities. The International SOS clinic offers a range of services in-house and through relationships with other hospitals and clinics. This clinic is famous for its emergency medical services and has relationships with most of Beijing's Fortune 500 companies. They are located in the East of Beijing within the third ring road.

== Other international clinics and hospitals ==
- Beijing International Medical Center
- Hong Kong International Medical Clinic
- Distinct Healthcare
- Vista Clinic
- Oasis Hospital
