= Wang Xiuying =

Chinese nurse

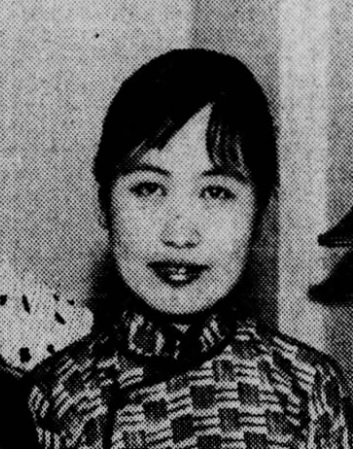
- Wang in 1935, when studying abroad in U.S.
- Born: 1908
- Disappeared: October 1990
- Education: Columbia University Teachers College (MA), Peking Union Medical College (BSc)
- Occupations: Nurse, educator, public health advocate
- Awards: Florence Nightingale Medal (1983)
- Honours: Honorary fellowship from Royal College of Nursing (1985)

Wang Xiuying (王秀瑛; sometimes transliterated as Hsui-ying Wang or Hsu-ying Wang; b. 1908, disappeared October 1990) was a Chinese nurse, educator, and public health advocate. She graduated from the Peking Union Medical College (PUMC) in 1931 and studied at the Columbia University Teachers College in 1935. Wang began her career teaching at PUMC and conducting public health research and promotion. During the Second Sino-Japanese War, she helped establish a temporary nursing school at West China Union University. In the 1950s she trained and supervised Chinese nurses during the Korean War, worked at the Beijing Bureau of Public Health, and established three new nursing schools. In 1961, she headed the nursing department at Beijing Second Medical College.

Wang founded the Chinese Journal of Nursing and served as vice-chairman of the Chinese Nursing Association board of directors for more than 35 years. She served as a deputy to the National People's Congress twice. In 1983, Wang became the first Chinese recipient of the Florence Nightingale Medal for distinguished nursing. She received an honorary fellowship from the Royal College of Nursing in 1985.

== Early life and education ==
Wang was born in 1908 in Baoding City, Hebei. She had a sister, and their parents were both teachers.

In 1926, Wang completed her basic schooling at a Beijing senior middle school and enrolled in the Peking Union Medical College (PUMC) as a nursing student. The story of Florence Nightingale had inspired her to pursue nursing. Wang completed her studies and received a BSc degree in 1931. Upon graduation, she began working at PUMC's affiliated hospital. and developed a personal focus on public health, hygiene for mothers and children, and household nursing.

In June 1935, Wang and two other Chinese nurses travelled to the United States to attend a week-long course in public health teaching methods at the University of Minnesota and subsequently complete a year of further study at Columbia University. Wang was a member of the Teachers College Rural Club during her time at Columbia, and she received her M.A. degree from Columbia University Teachers College in the 1935–36 academic year. She returned to China committed to employing her skills to improve public health in her home country.

== Career ==
Between 1931 and 1949, Wang held an associate professor position at PUMC. She taught nursing and public health and also conducted investigations into health issues affecting minority ethnic groups in the Sichuan Province, such as the Yi people. During her early career Wang published the text A Summary of the Evolution and Theory of Public Health, developed a primary school textbook to teach children about public health and disease prevention, and wrote a play on the subject of public health that was featured in a Chinese journal on nursing. She went on to author a book on the History of Nursing in China.

During the Second Sino-Japanese War, the Japanese army took control of PUMC in late 1941, and staff were forced to evacuate. PUMC staff and alumni decided to set up a temporary school of nursing at the West China Union University (WCUU), and Wang took on the role of superintendent of nurses for the WCUU hospital. In the aftermath of Japan's surrender in 1945, Wang participated in a nursing education planning committee to develop a full baccalaureate program for nursing at WCUU before the PUMC nurses returned to their home university.

After the Korean War began in 1950, Wang directed a training course for 50 head nurses and spent time supervising nursing work in the Yalu River area. She became vice-chairman of the board of directors for the Chinese Nursing Association in August 1950. She would serve in the role of vice-chairman for more than 35 years. Wang was transferred to the Beijing Bureau of Public Health in 1954 and proceeded to help establish three new nursing schools in China, becoming principal of the third school. In 1961, she was made head of the nursing department of the Beijing Second Medical College. She founded the Chinese Journal of Nursing and continued to run training courses on public health and skills for head nurses.

During 1978 and 1983, Wang served as a deputy to the National People's Congress, representing the provinces of Jiangsu and Heilongjiang respectively. In July 1983, Wang was awarded the international Florence Nightingale Medal, becoming the first Chinese recipient. In 1985, she received an honorary fellowship from the Royal College of Nursing. Wang served as nursing advisor for Tongren Hospital during the 1980s and was chairman of the Popular Science Commission.

== Disappearance ==
According to biographer Wolfgang Bartke, Wang disappeared in October 1990.

== Published works ==
- Peng, Damou; Wang, Xiuying (March 1936). "小学健康教学实" [Elementary school health education trials]. 公共衛生月刊 [Public Health Monthly] (in Chinese). 1 (9): 1–22.
- Wyne, Margaret R.; Hsu-Ying, Wang (1940). "Health Nursing in Peking". The American Journal of Nursing. 40 (10): 1107–1114. doi:10.2307/3414980. JSTOR 3414980.
