= Beijing Anzhen Hospital =

Coordinates: 39.971532°N 116.397096°E

Beijing Anzhen Hospital, Capital Medical University (Chinese: 首都医科大学附属北京安贞医院)
- Anzhen Campus

Geography
- Location: No. 2 Anzhen Road, Chaoyang District, Beijing

Organisation
- Type: Public, general, 3A
- Affiliated university: Capital Medical University

History
- Founded: 1984

Links
- Website: https://www.anzhen.org.cn/

The Beijing Anzhen Hospital, shortly Anzhen Hospital, is an affiliated hospital of the Capital Medical University in Beijing. Founded in 1984, Anzhen Hospital is now a top Grade A tertiary hospital focusing on the treatment of cardiovascular and pulmonary diseases, integrating medical treatment, teaching and research.

In addition to the Anzhen Campus, there is a newly-built Tongzhou Campus.

== History ==
On September 2, 1981, the Beijing Institute of Cardiovascular and Pulmonary Diseases was officially established at Beijing Chaoyang Hospital, with Academician Wu Yingkai presiding over the founding ceremony.

On April 14, 1984, Beijing Anzhen Hospital was officially established with a total of 428 beds. It was a medical and scientific research consortium with the Beijing Institute of Cardiovascular and Pulmonary Diseases. Dr. Wu Yingkai was appointed its president.

In 1991, it became the affiliated Beijing Anzhen Hospital of Capital Medical College.

In 1994, Anzhen Hospital was designated an International Baby-Friendly Hospital by WHO & UNICEF.

In 2014, Beijing Institute of Integrated Traditional Chinese and Western Medicine for Cardiovascular and Pulmonary Diseases was founded.

In 2024, the world's largest cardiovascular clinical sample bank was built at Beijing Anzhen Hospital.

In 2026, Anzhen Hospital became the first demonstration unit for "robots plus medical" applications designated by the Beijing city government, with 25 types of medical robots undergoing trial services.

== Campuses ==
There are two campuses.

=== Anzhen Campus ===
The Anzhen Campus is located at No. 2 Anzhen Road, Chaoyang District, covering an area of 76,500 square meters, with 1,500 inpatient beds.

=== Tongzhou Campus ===
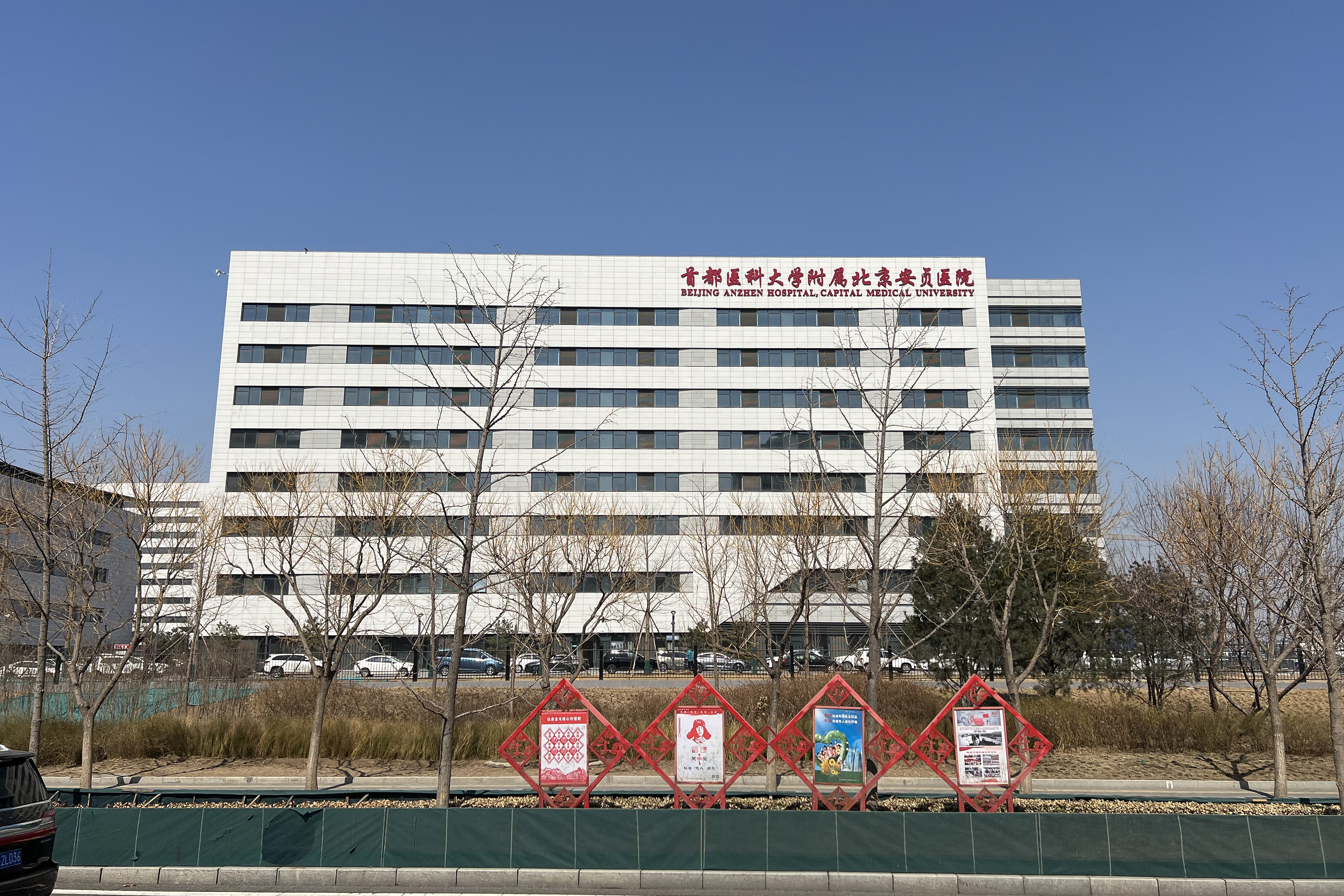
Anzhen Hospital Tongzhou Campus (photographed in March 2024)

The Tongzhou Campus, which opened on October 19, 2024, is located in Songzhuang Town. It covers a total area of 462 mu and has a floor space of about 340,000 square meters, with a capacity of 1,300 beds. The campus consists of multiple buildings, including a medical complex, laboratories, research buildings, and teaching buildings, with large areas of green landscaping between the buildings.

== Departments ==
The hospital has the following departments.

=== Clinical Departments ===
Coronary Artery Disease Center, Arrhythmia Center, Cardiovascular Critical Care Center, Heart Failure and Cardiomyopathy Center, Interventional Cardiac Valve Disease Center, Cardiac Pacing and CIED Center, Comprehensive Cardiology Department, Hypertension Center, Pulmonary Vascular Disease Center, Dual-Heart Medical Center, Cardiac Rehabilitation Center, Aortic Surgery Center, Coronary Artery Disease Surgery Center, Structural Heart Disease Surgery Center, Valvular and Atrial Fibrillation Surgery Center, Minimally Invasive Cardiac Surgery Center, Heart Failure and Valvular Surgery Center, Comprehensive Cardiac Surgery Department, Pediatric Cardiology Center, Geriatric Cardiovascular Disease Center, Cardiovascular Surgery Critical Care Center, Emergency Critical Care Center, Anesthesia and Surgery Center, Nephrology Department, Respiratory Department, Critical Care Medicine, Gastroenterology, Rheumatology and Immunology, Endocrinology, Infectious Diseases, Pediatrics, Hematology, Traditional Chinese Medicine Physiotherapy, General Practice, Clinical Psychology, Sleep Medicine Center, Clinical Nutrition, Obstetrics and Gynecology, Vascular Surgery Center, Pain Management, Urology, Thoracic Surgery, General Surgery, Orthopedics, Stomatology, Dermatology and Venereology, Ophthalmology, Otolaryngology-Head and Neck Surgery, Intensive Care Unit, Plastic and Cosmetic Surgery and Laser Medicine, Health Checkup Center.

=== Medical Technology Departments ===
Medical Imaging, Cardiac Ultrasound Center, Fetal Cardiac and Maternal-Fetal Medicine Center, Comprehensive Ultrasound, Interventional Ultrasound, Interventional Diagnosis and Treatment, Pharmacy, Pathology, Nuclear Medicine, Laboratory Medicine, Blood Transfusion, Medical Records Room.

== Other information ==
Beijing Anzhen Hospital is now a National Clinical Research Center for Cardiovascular Diseases. There are more than 4,000 employees and 1,500 patient beds. The hospital covers an area of 76,500 square meters. It handles 2.7 million outpatient and emergency visits annually and performs over 40,000 surgeries.

The hospital is the Sixth Clinical Medical College of Capital Medical University. It has over 1,900 students. Over the years, the hospital has trained more than 10,000 high-level professionals in cardiopulmonary and vascular-related disciplines.

In scientific research, the hospital published 66 papers listed in Nature Index for the time frame of 1 July 2025 - 30 June 2026, ranking 191st globally and 80th in China.

In the 2024 China Hospital and Specialty Reputation Ranking, Anzhen Hospital ranked A++ (top-60) in the comprehensive hospital ranking, 2nd in Cardiac Surgery and #3 in Cardiovascular Disease nationally.

== See also ==
- Capital Medical University
- List of hospitals in China
- List of hospitals in Beijing
