= China–Japan Friendship Hospital =

Coordinates: 39.972673°N 116.420274°E

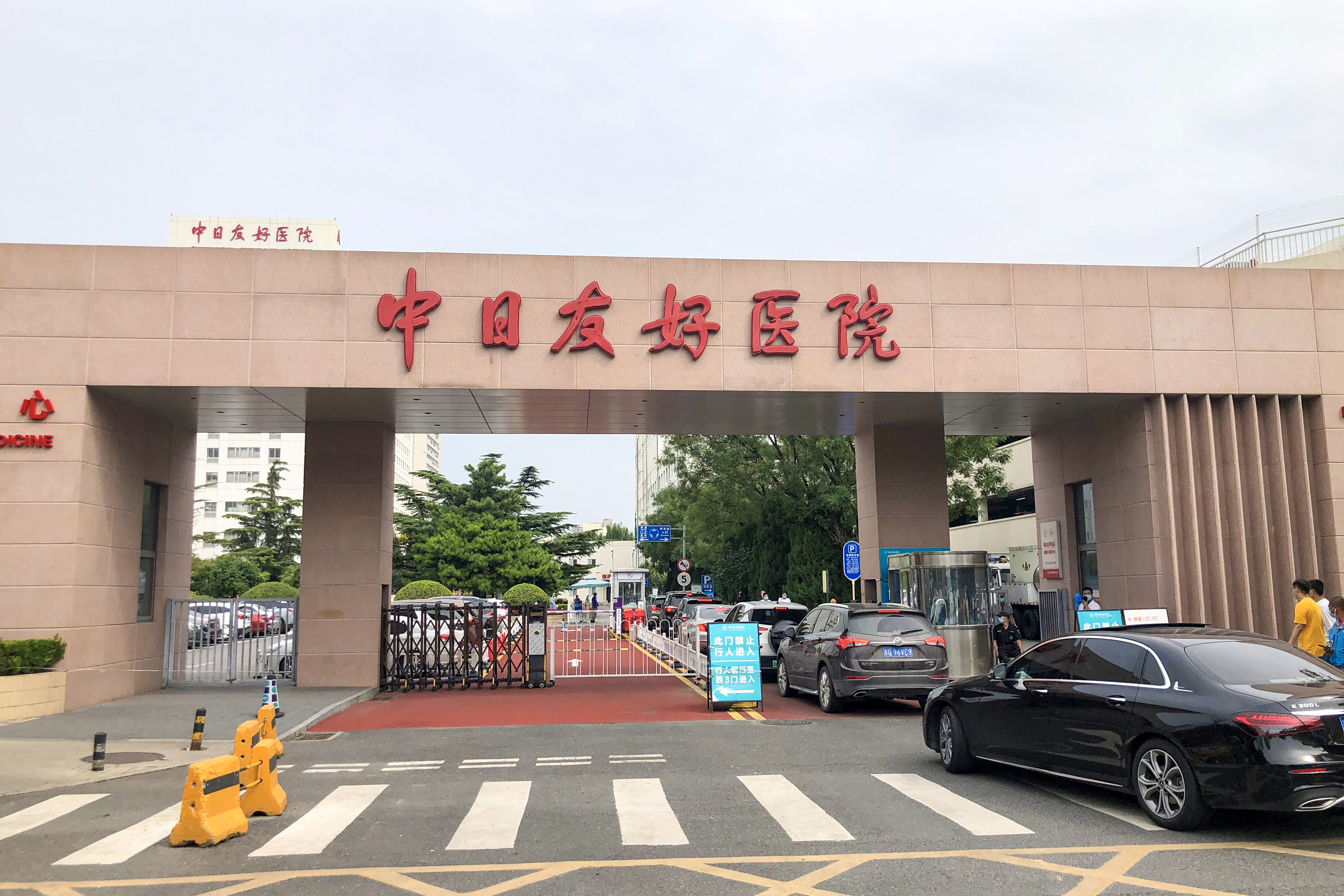
- Entrance 1

Geography
- Location: Yinghuayuan East Street, Chaoyang District, Beijing, China

Organisation
- Care system: Medicare
- Type: District General

Services
- Emergency department: Yes
- Beds: 1,500

History
- Founded: 1984

Links
- Website: www.zryhyy.com.cn
- Lists: Hospitals in China

China–Japan Friendship Hospital

Chinese name
- Simplified Chinese: 中日友好医院
- Traditional Chinese: 中日友好醫院
Transcriptions
Standard Mandarin
- Hanyu Pinyin: Zhōng Rì Yǒuhǎo Yīyuàn

Japanese name
- Kanji: 中日友好医院
- Hiragana: ちゅうにちゆうこういいん
Transcriptions
- Romanization: Chūnichi Yūkō Iin

The China–Japan Friendship Hospital (Chinese: 中日友好医院), also abbreviated as China–Japan Hospital, was established through the cooperation of the Chinese and Japanese governments during the 1980s. The hospital has been directly affiliated with China's Ministry of Health since its first day of operation, October 23, 1984. The hospital is located on Yinghuayuan East Street, Chaoyang District, Beijing. The hospital covers 9.7 hectares (24 acres), with floorspace of facilities measuring 180,000 square metres (1,900,000 sq ft). Within the hospital, there are 1,500 beds, 58 departments, as well as a clinical research and education center. The hospital has intensive care and treatment of severe diseases as a primary focus and integrative eastern-western medicinal therapy as an additional area of expertise. The hospital often attends to the health care of senior officials from over 100 countries and regions.

The hospital is the teaching hospital of Beijing University Medical School, Beijing University of Traditional Chinese Medicine, China Medical University and Tianjin Medical University, etc. The hospital carries out medical care, education, scientific research, preventative medicine and rehabilitation.

== Overview ==
The China–Japan Friendship Hospital was designated a tertiary A-level hospital in 1993. It was also ranked among the “Top 10 Hospitals in Beijing” and as one of the “Top 100 Hospitals in China.” In 2001, it was listed as one of the Central Government's health care hospitals. It serves as the teaching hospital for student interns from Peking University and Beijing University of Chinese Medicine. In 2004, it was one of the first hospitals to offer year-round outpatient therapy without closing for holidays.

In 2005, the hospital was named "National Integrative Medicine Center for Cardiovascular disease" and "National Pain Clinical Research Center". On behalf of China's Ministry of Health, the hospital is in charge of research programs in the fields of nephrology, neurology, cardiology, orthopedics, and Traditional Chinese Medicine (TCM) oncology, the latter is a subject of the National Administration of Traditional Chinese Medicine. Two programs offered by the hospital, electro-chemotherapy and "An's Therapy" in proctology, are listed by China's Ministry of Health among the top 100 programs of the decade. Several departments, including Orthopedics, TCM Rheumatology, and Electro-Chemotherapy, have taken charge of major programs under the Fund of Capital Medical Development.

In 2006, the hospital was designated an A-class medical institution, with the ability to serve any insurance policyholder within Beijing. Among the staff, more than 450 hold advanced titles and technical posts, and nearly 400 have master's degrees or higher. The hospital is equipped with medical devices such as MRI, Spiral CT, DSA, MLA, Color Doppler, operation pilot system, and automatic biochemistry analyzer.

As a major medical institution in China, the China–Japan Friendship Hospital was rated as "Beijing's best hospital for foreigners" by the Association for Foreigners. Cooperative programs have been established in conjunction with universities, academies, and medical institutions in Japan, the United States, France, and Korea.

The national government of China recognized the China–Japan Friendship Hospital as an example of national spirit when, in 2003, it was designated a key hospital in the battle against SARS. The hospital was the designated medical center for the 2008 Summer Olympics. In addition to the safeguarding of spectators and participants in the National Stadium (the "Bird’s Nest"), it was the primary medical facility serving the athletes, coaches, referees, and officials.

Since 1984, co-operative projects have been set up between the hospital and overseas universities, including Tokyo University, Keio University, Osaka University, Washington University in St. Louis, Harvard University, Cambridge University and Helsinki Polytechnics.

== Scope of service ==
Clinical services:

- Acupuncture
- Cardiology
- Cardiovascular surgery
- Colorectal surgery
- Clinical laboratory
- Dermatology
- Dental care and orthodontics
- Digestive disorders
- Diabetes
- Endocrinology
- Emergency medicine
- Otorhinolaryngology
- Gastroenterology
- General surgery
- Gynecology
- Immunology
- Infectious medicine
- Internal medicine
- Lung and spleen
- Massage
- Neurology
- Nephrology
- Neurosurgery
- Orthopedics
- Obstetrics and gynecology
- Ophthalmology
- Oncology
- Pediatrics
- Pain clinic
- Pharmacy
- Psychological counseling
- Respiratory medicine
- Rheumatology
- Rehabilitation
- Thoracic surgery
- Urology
- Ultrasound services

== Location and access ==
The China–Japan Friendship Hospital is located on Yinghuayuan East Street, Chaoyang District 100029. Nearest subway stations are Guangxi Men (Lines 12 and 13), Shaoyaoju (Lines 10 and 13), and Huixin Xijie Beikou (Line 5).

== See also ==
- List of hospitals in Beijing
