= Beijing Tiantan Hospital =

Beijing Tiantan Hospital 北京天壇醫院
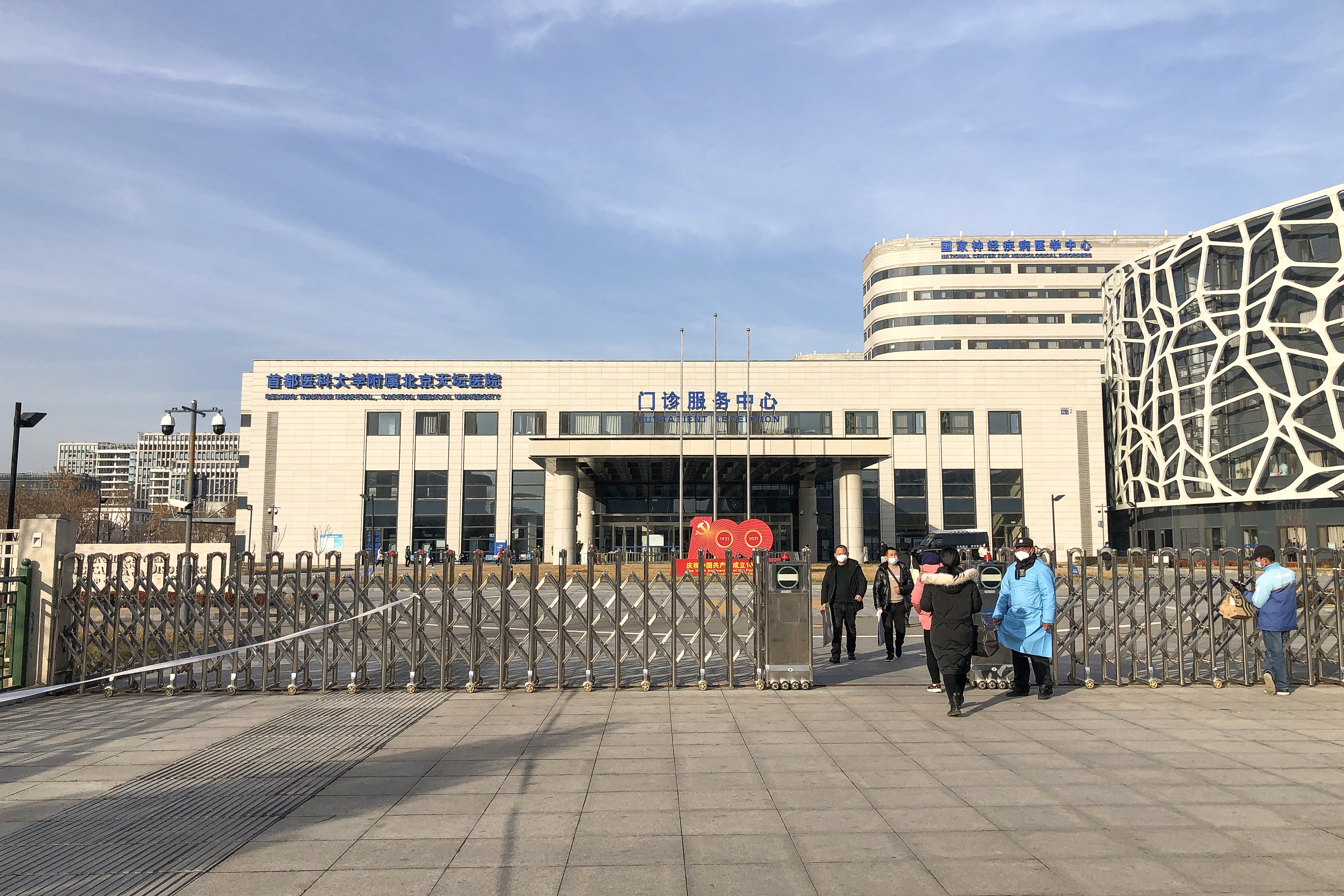
- Outpatient Entrance

Geography
- Location: No. 119, South Fourth Ring Road West, Fengtai District, Beijing, China
- Coordinates: 39.8322°N 116.3088°E

Organisation
- Type: Public, Teaching Hospital
- Affiliated university: Capital Medical University

Services
- Beds: 1650

History
- Founded: 1956

Links
- Website: Official website
- Lists: Hospitals in China

The Beijing Tiantan Hospital, shortly Tiantan Hospital, is a Grade A tertiary hospital located near Tiantan (the Temple of Heaven) in Beijing, China. Founded in 1956, Beijing Tiantan Hospital is now a large general hospital with a focus on clinical neuroscience. It also serves as the China National Clinical Research Center for Neurological Diseases and an affiliated hospital of the Capital Medical University, responsible for medical treatment, teaching and scientific research.

== History ==
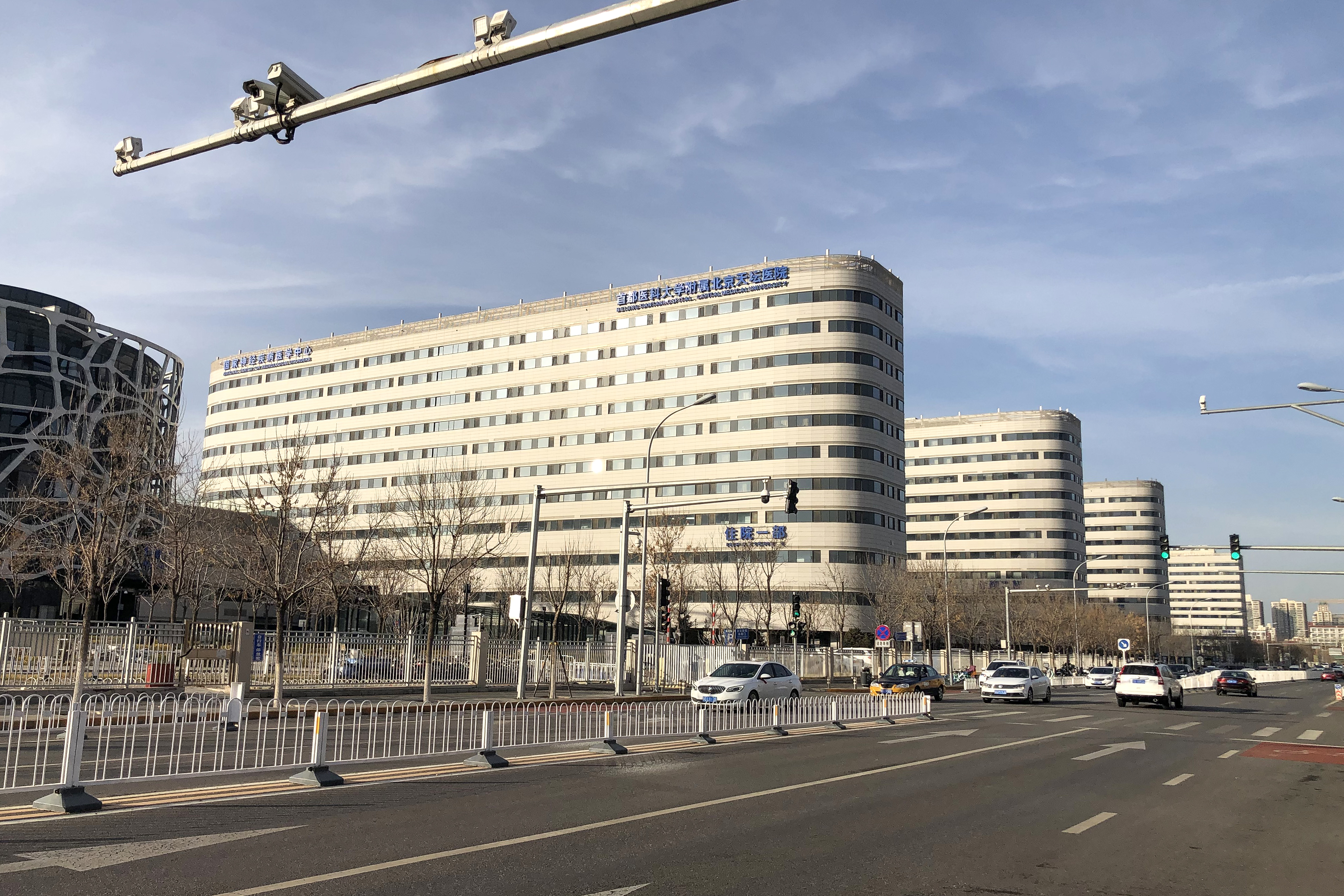
Tiantan Hospital Inpatient Department

Beijing Tiantan Hospital was initially established in the 1930s, its predecessor being the "31st Rear Hospital of the Kuomintang Army".

In February 1949, the hospital was taken over by the Chinese People's Liberation Army and renamed the "Second Rear Hospital of the North China Military Region". In April of the same year, it was renamed the "People's Hospital of the North China Administrative Committee". In October, it was placed under the leadership of the Ministry of Health of the Central People's Government and renamed the "North China People's Hospital".

In January 1953, the hospital was renamed the "First Hospital of the Central Directly Subordinate Organs of the Ministry of Health".

On August 23, 1956, the hospital was transferred from the Ministry of Health to the Beijing Municipal Public Health Bureau and was renamed "Beijing Tiantan Hospital". Since then, the date has been used as the founding date of Beijing Tiantan Hospital.

During the Cultural Revolution, in February 1970, Tiantan Hospital was ordered to relocate to Gansu Province. In July 1970, the remaining staff of the former Tiantan Hospital and some staff of the Qianmen Hospital in Chongwen District established the "Chongwen Hospital of Beijing Chongwen District" at the original site of Tiantan Hospital.

On January 7, 1982, the original name "Beijing Tiantan Hospital" was restored. In April 1982, the Beijing Neurosurgical Institute and 75 neurosurgical medical staff moved from Xuanwu Hospital to Beijing Tiantan Hospital, making it a top institution for neurosurgical prevention, treatment, education and academic research in China.

After 1985, the hospital was renamed "Beijing Tiantan Hospital affiliated to the Capital Medical College". In 1994, it was renamed "Beijing Tiantan Hospital, affiliated with Capital Medical University". It is also the Fifth Clinical Medical College of Capital Medical University.

In November 1996, Beijing Tiantang Hospital was named one of the ten model hospitals for civilized service nationwide by the Ministry of Health.

In 1997, the hospital was jointly established by the Chinese Academy of Medical Sciences and the Beijing Municipal Health Bureau as "Beijing Tiantan Hospital of the Chinese Academy of Medical Sciences" and the "Institute of Neuroscience of the Chinese Academy of Medical Sciences", which became one of the world's three major neurosurgical research centers, the largest clinical, research, and teaching base for neurosurgery in Asia, and the WHO Collaborating Centre for Neuroscience Training in China.

In 2018, Beijing Tiantan Hospital moved to Fengtai District, and the number of beds increased to 1,650.

In 2022, a breakthrough made by the Tiantang Hospital in brain-machine interface was reported on the Science (journal).

In 2024, Tiantang Hospital successfully developed the world's first Chinese-language digital radiologist Xiaojun, based on a large language AI model specifically designed and developed for medical imaging diagnosis. It achieved a one-time diagnosis accuracy rate of over 95 percent.

In 2025, China's first brain-computer interface clinical and translational ward was set up in Beijing Tiantang Hospital.

== Other information ==
The Beijing Tiantan Hospital is a large general hospital with a focus on clinical neuroscience, integrating medical treatment, teaching and scientific research. It occupies a land area of 181,591 square meters providing a building area of 352,294 square meters. There are 67 clinical departments and 1,650 beds, and 3210 employees by 2019. The design of neural grid network on the exterior facade of the new hospital building highlights its focuses on neurology.

In the resent years, the hospital has won one First-Class National Science and Technology Progress Award and two Second-Class Awards.

Beijing Tiantan Hospital has published in Nature, Science, Cell, NEJM, The Lancet, JAMA, and BMJ, etc. There are 67 papers listed in the Nature Index for the Time frame of 1 January 2025 – 31 December 2025, ranking 120th globally and 42nd in China in healthcare.

Beijing Tiantan Hospital has three members of the two academies (China), one Yangtze River Scholar, one Young Yangtze River Scholar and 132 doctoral supervisors.

Hospital address: No. 119, South 4th Ring West Road, Fengtai District, Beijing, China.

== See also ==
- Capital Medical University
- List of hospitals in China
