= Dongzhimen Hospital =

Hospital in Beijing, China

Dongzhimen Hospital (simplified Chinese: 东直门医院; traditional Chinese: 東直門醫院; pinyin: Dōngzhímén Yīyuàn), full name the "Dongzhimen Hospital of Beijing University of Chinese Medicine", is a Grade A tertiary hospital and the First Clinical Medical College of Beijing University of Chinese Medicine. It is famous for combining Traditional Chinese Medicine (TCM) with modern medical sciences. Founded in 1958, the hospital has become a large TCM hospital with multiple practice locations in Beijing, integrating clinical treatment, academic research and medical education.

== History ==
Dongzhimen Hospital was officially established in Dongcheng District, Beijing in 1958.

In 1979, it undertook the teaching tasks of Beijing Medical College.

In 1991, it was approved by the Ministry of Health as a Grade A tertiary hospital.

In 1991, it established its first branch in Europe—the Kötzting Hospital, the first licensed TCM hospital in Germany.

In 1997, it became the "First Clinical Medical College" of Beijing University of Chinese Medicine.

In 2008, Dongzhimen Hospital won the 2008 International Award for Contribution to Chinese Medicine by the World Federation of Chinese Medicine Societies (WFCMS).

In 2011, the Tongzhou TCM Hospital was merged into Dongzhimen Hospital and became its eastern campus.

In 2025, the hospital was selected as a national Standardization Research and Transformation Center for Traditional Chinese Medicine.

== Campuses ==
=== Dongcheng District Campus ===
The headquarters is located at No. 5, Haiyuncang, Dongcheng District, Beijing.

=== East Campus ===
The East Campus (Tongzhou Campus) of Dongzhimen Hospital is located at No. 116, West Cuiping Road, Tongzhou District, Beijing.

=== International Department ===
The International Department is located at No. 279, North Dongsi Avenue, Dongcheng District, Beijing.

== Other information ==
The hospital has 1574 beds, 40 clinical specialties, and handles nearly 3 million outpatient and emergency visits annually.

There are 5 traditional Chinese medicine medical centers.

There are 16 Key specialties, including: Nephropathy, Encephalopathy, Acute syndrome, Orthopedic Traumatology, Diseases of spleen-stomach, Anorectal disease, Peripheral vascular disease, Gynaecology, Geratology, Tuinamessage, Acupuncture and moxibustion, Lung diseases, Heart disease, Prevention of disease, Clinical pharmacy.

There are two Academicians of the Chinese Academy of Engineering, one national TCM master and one nationally renowned TCM physician.

The hospital has one key discipline commissioned by the Ministry of Education of China, nine key disciplines commissioned by the State Administration of Traditional Chinese Medicine and one national TCM clinical research base.
