= Xuanwu Hospital =

Xuanwu Hospital (Chinese: 宣武医院)
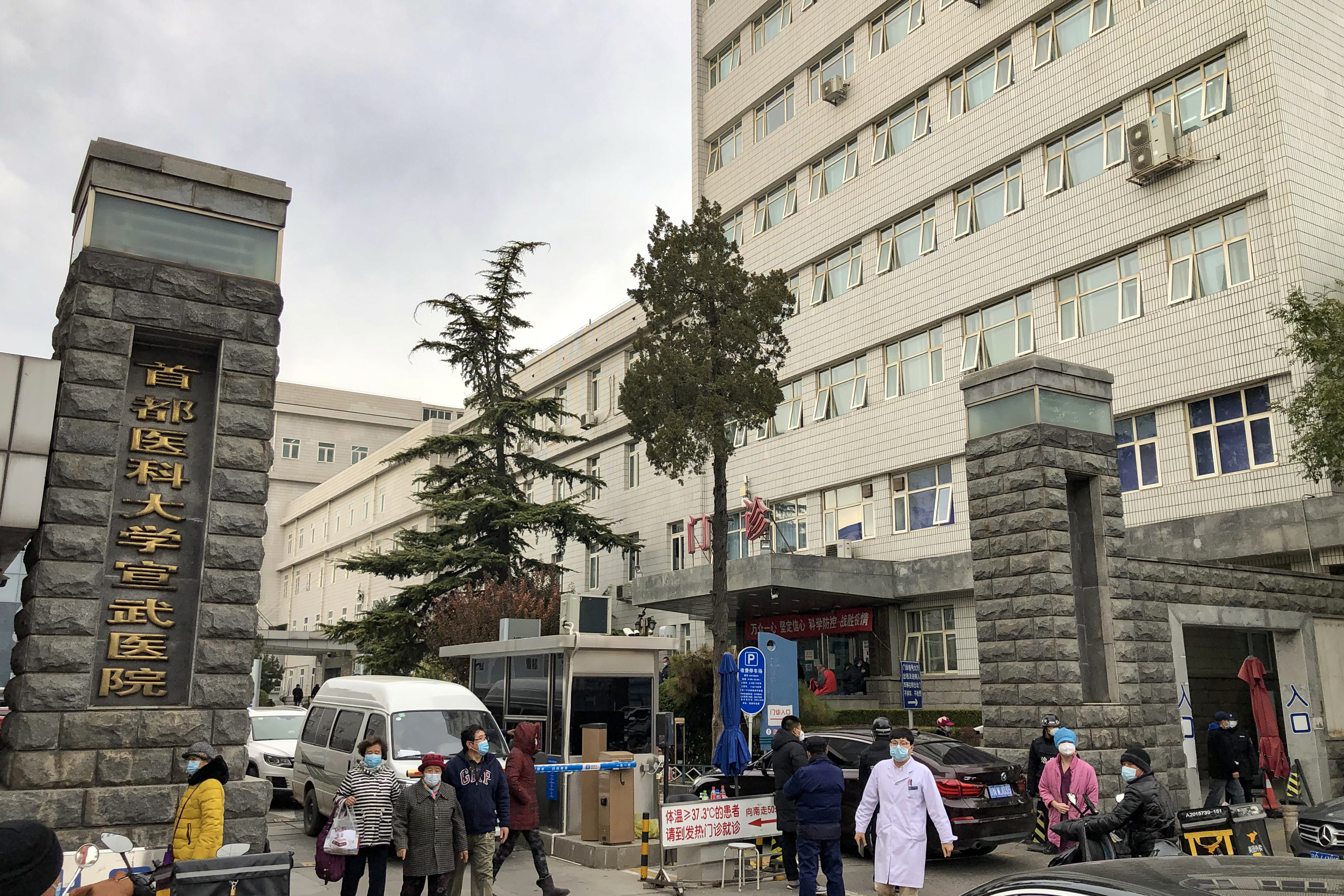
- Xuanwu Hospital East Gate (November 2020)

Geography
- Location: No. 45 Changchun Street, Xicheng District, Beijing, China
- Coordinates: 39.890706°N 116.356409°E

Organisation
- Type: General hospital
- Affiliated university: Capital Medical University

Services
- Beds: 2,800

History
- Founded: 1958

Links
- Website: www.xwhosp.com.cn
- Lists: Hospitals in China

Xuanwu Hospital, or "Beijing Xuanwu Hospital", full name "Xuanwu Hospital of Capital Medical University", is the First Clinical Medical College of the Capital Medical University in Beijing. Founded in 1958, Xuanwu Hospital has developed into a large general Grade A tertiary hospital featuring neuroscience and geriatrics, responsible for medical treatment, education and research. Xuanwu Hospital was one of the medical bases to introduce neurology to China.

== History ==
In 1958, the “Beijing Xuanwu District Hospital” was founded in Beijing. It was one of the earliest bases for neuroscience in China.

In 1960, Xuanwu Hospital established China's first research institution for neurosurgery: the Beijing Neurosurgical Institute.

In 1985, the Beijing Geriatric Medical Research Center (or Beijing Institute of Geriatric Medicine) was established in Xuanwu Hospital. It was the first geriatric medicine research institution in China.

In November 2004, Xuanwu Hospital and the Germany International Neuroscience Institute jointly established the China International Neuroscience Institute (CHINA-INI).

In 2008, Xuanwu was a designated medical service hospital for the Beijing Olympic and Paralympic Games.

In 2016, the National Clinical Research Center for Geriatric Diseases was established in Xuanwu Hospital.

In July 2021, the First Hospital of Hebei Medical University added "Xuanwu Hospital of Capital Medical University Hebei Hospital" as its secondary name.

In 2022, XuanWu Hospital became a “National Medical Center Construction Project Unit”.

In October, 2023, a clinical team of Xuanwu Hospital put a wireless processor into the skull of a paralyzed patient, resulting in his motor skills well recovered, including the ability to drink a bottle of water.

In April 2026, Xuanwu Hospital launched China's first AI full-process management platform for Parkinson's disease. Patients can interact with AI doctors via their mobile phones.

== Current situation ==
Xuanwu Hospital is a general Grade A tertiary hospital with a focus on neuroscience and geriatrics, featuring the treatment of cardiovascular and cerebrovascular diseases. It houses the National Center for Neurological Diseases, China International Neuroscience Institute, and the National Clinical Research Center for Geriatric Diseases.

The hospital covers an area of 380,000 square meters with more than 2,800 patient beds. There are 3,500 employees serving 2.6 million outpatient visits and performing more than 30,000 surgeries annually.

The hospital trains more than 2,000 medical students and resident physicians each year.

Xuanwu Hospital published 48 papers listed in Nature Index for the Time frame of 1 January 2025 - 31 December 2025, ranking 242nd globally and 99th in China in healthcare.

In addition to the main campus in Xicheng District, there are branches in Xiong'an New Area, Hebei Province, and Inner Mongolia

Hospital address: No. 45 Changchun Street, Xicheng District (formerly Xuanwu District), Beijing.

== See also ==
- Capital Medical University
- Department of Neurology, Xuanwu hospital
- List of hospitals in China
