= Shao Li =

University Professor

Shao Li (Chinese: 李梢) is a tenured professor at Tsinghua University. His main research interest is in bioinformatics, network pharmacology and precision medicine on cancer prevention. Li is a member of the European Academy of Sciences and Arts, a Fellow of the Royal Society of Chemistry and a Fellow of the Royal Society of Biology, UK. Li obtained his BSc from Beijing University of Chinese Medicine in 1995, MS from Wannan College of Medicine in 1998 and M.D. from Beijing University of Chinese Medicine in 2001. He wrote the Network Pharmacology International Guideline in 2021 and was the editor of the network pharmacology monograph (Springer Press) in 2021. He proposed the theory and technologies of "network target" and natural medicine network pharmacology (ESI highly cited paper and ESI hot spot paper). Li established the “exceedingly-early” paradigm of cancer diagnosis and interception, with significantly improving the clinical prevention efficiency for gastric cancer.

== Academic memberships ==
Li is currently serving as the director of the first Tsinghua University Interdisciplinary Institute of Traditional Chinese Medicine, and the chairman of the Specialty Committee of Network Pharmacology of the World Federation of Chinese Medicine Society and Specialty Committee of Biomedical Big Data of the Chinese Society of Biotechnology. He also serves as Editorial Board Members including Cancer Biology & Medicine, Pharmacological Research, Journal of Ethnopharmacology. He has delivered keynote speeches in the NIH/NCI and other international conferences.

He has been recognized as one of the top 2% Scientists Worldwide in 2019/2020/2021/2022/2023/2024 (by Stanford University). He won the top award of both Gold Medal with congratulations of the Jury and Gold Medal in the 49th Geneva International Exhibition of Inventions (2024). He has also received 2024 China Pharmaceutical Development Award, the 1st Class of International Award for Outstanding Contribution to Chinese Medicine in 2020, and the Li Shizhen Pharmaceutical Innovation Award in 2019. He was also awarded Grand Challenges 2015—Young Scientists (Bill & Melinda Gates Foundation, 2015), the National Outstanding Young Scientist (China, 2012), the first network pharmacology patent (USA, 2012), and National Science and Technology Progress Award (China, 2004)
