= Nankou =

Nankou may refer to:

- Nankou, Beijing, area in Changping District, Beijing
- Nankou railway station, in Changping District, Beijing
- Huixin Xijie Nankou station, a metro station in Chaoyang District, Beijing
