= Tingyu Fang =

English Chinese Professor

Tingyu Fang was born in 1935 in Shanghai. He graduated from the Beijing University of Foreign Studies in 1957. He is currently an English Chinese Professor.

== Career ==
Fang has held various academic and professional roles related to traditional Chinese medicine and language education. He has taught medical English at Beijing University of Chinese Medicine and served as the Director of its Foreign Language Department. Currently, he is a professor at the university, where he specializes in English communication and leads the Center for English Studies.

In addition to his academic work, Fang has been involved in translation and international collaboration within the field of Chinese medicine. He serves as the Chief Adviser for the Chinese Association of Traditional Chinese Medicine Translation Panel and is the Vice President of the Professional Committee of the World Federation of Chinese Medicine Translation. He has also contributed as an editorial board adviser for bilingual teaching materials on Chinese medicine published by the Ministry of Health.

Fang has participated in public service roles, including membership in the Chaoyang District People's Political Consultative Conference (CPPCC) since 1993. He has also been a member of the National Committee of the CPPCC during its ninth and tenth sessions (1998–2008). In 2008, he led the translation group for the World Health Organization (WHO) Congress on Traditional Medicine.

He has been associated with Harvard University as a former vice-chairman of the Harvard Beijing Club and President of the Harvard Alumni Association in Beijing.

== Sources ==
- Bin Hu, http://zhongyi.Sina.com/news/jkkx/20117/67482.shtml, SINA news, updated July 21, 2011 (in Chinese)
- Vicker, http://www.hudong.com/wiki/%E6%96%B9%E5%BB%B7%E9%92%B0,2009 update on December 23 (in Chinese)
- Junjie Chen, http://news.Sina.com.CN/c/2006-02-27/05599209207.shtml, SINA news, updated February 27, 2006 (in Chinese)
- Wenying Xie, Wei Wei, http://www.JCRB.com/N1/jcrb1492/ca658722.htm, check daily, updated December 3, 2007 (in Chinese)
- Ying Zhang, http://www.infzm.com/content/27743, southern weekly, April 29, 2009, update (in Chinese)
- Wei Ku, http://business.Sohu.com/20090109/n261662682.shtml, Sohu finance, transferred from the people's network, updated January 9, 2009 (in Chinese)
- WorldCat, http://www.WorldCat.org/wcidentities/LCCN-n86-128897, column published works (in English)
- yuyu, http://www.zhongyiyao.net/bbs/thread-44464-1-1.html, updated October 27, 2011(in Chinese)
