= Dihua Yu =

Chinese oncologist

Dihua Yu is a Chinese medical researcher.

Yu earned a Doctor of Medicine from Capital Medical University in 1982, followed by a Master of Science at the same university in 1985. She then moved to the United States, and completed a PhD at the University of Texas Health Science Center at Houston in 1991. Yu holds the Hubert L. & Olive Stringer Distinguished Chair in Basic Science at the MD Anderson Cancer Center.

In 2011, Yu was elected a fellow of the American Association for the Advancement of Science.
