= Puhua International Hospital and Clinics =

Hospital network in China

APM

Puhua International Hospitals (PIH) is the first international-standard hospital service established in Beijing. It was originally established in 1993 as a joint venture between Asia Pacific Medical Group (APM) and Beijing Tiantan Neurological Hospital, making it the first international joint venture hospital service to operate in China. From the original Tiantan location, the Puhua network has expanded to include Puhua International Hospital – Shuangjing and Puhua International Hospital – TEDA. All facilities cater to both international and Chinese patients.

== Facilities ==
=== Beijing Tiantan Puhua International Hospital ===
The Temple of Heaven location in Beijing was the first Puhua facility opened. The facility was established over 20 years ago, and the full-serviced hospital has developed into the leader in neurology and neurosurgery in China. The hospital was initially developed as a private, adjunct facility to the Tiantan Neurological Hospital. This affiliation is what developed the Tiantan Puhua Hospital's heritage in neurology and neurosurgery; Tiantan Neurological Hospital is a large and advance neurology and neurosurgery center, which partners with the World Health Organization on neurology training cooperation.

The facility has over 70 beds, an international-standard operating room, and a 24-hour intensive care unit. The hospital has the capability to diagnose and treat medical problems ranging from routine outpatient health ailments and vaccinations, to severe illnesses and complicated surgical interventions. Specialties of the Tiantan hospital include neurology, neurosurgery, oncology, general medicine, endocrinology, rehabilitation, stem cell research, TCM, holistic nutrition, primary care, cardiology, podiatry, orthopedics, anti-age/rejuvenation, and knee/hip regeneration. The hospital has over 200 support personnel, and can accommodate multiple languages.^{[new citation needed]}

Its stem cell treatment and neurosurgery can help patients heal from spinal cord injury.

=== Puhua International Hospital – Shuangjing ===
Location: 54 Wusheng North Road, East Third Ring, Chaoyang District, Beijing, China, 100022

Established in 2005, Puhua International Hospital – Shuangjing is a 24-hour clinic that is one of only three international clinics in Beijing able to accommodate both outpatient and inpatient needs. The clinic's doctors are from a wide range of backgrounds, and can all speak two languages. Whilst the majority of doctors do speak English, the clinic also has a team of English speaking nurses who can aid Westerners with non-English speaking doctors. The clinic has medical equipment including a pharmacy, laboratory and diagnostic testing medical equipment.

Puhua International Hospital – Shuangjing offers service in the following departments; orthopedics, orthopedic surgery, podiatry, sports medicine, neurology, neurosurgery, chiropractic, family medicine, trauma surgery, rehabilitation, oncology, TCM, dermatology, pediatrics, surgery, cardiovascular, ENT, gynecology, ophthalmology, endocrinology, women's health and children's health.

=== TEDA-Puhua Hospital ===
Location: 61 Third Avenue, Tianjin, China

The Puhua TEDA hospital was opened in 2011 as the first sino-foreign medical facility in Tianjin.

The medical services of TEDA include a cardiac surgery department, coronary care unit, intensive care unit, cardiology department, emergency department, outpatient department, interventional center, nuclear medicine department, and electrophysiology department.

== Parent organization ==
American Pacific Medical Group (APMG) is the parent organization of Puhua International Hospitals. The group was founded in 1992 in the US by 35 American doctors and surgeons with the purpose of bringing world-class healthcare into Southeast Asia and China. APM has developed into the fastest growing international healthcare provider in its region, and now has 14 clinics and seven hospitals.^{[new citation needed]}

=== History ===
After the group formed, the first joint-venture medical hospital in Shanghai was established by 1993: the 'Shanghai Gamma Knife Hospital. In the same year APM established Beijing Tiantan Puhua International hospital. In 1995, the Beijing Gamma Knife Center was opened. In 1999, APM set up top-level treatment centers with leading hospitals in Chongching, Dalian, and Shenyang. In 2005, APM set up Puhua International Hospital - Shuangjing, an adjunct facility of the Beijing Tiantan Hospital, to serve Chinese and foreigners seeking international-standard care and medical services. In 2009, APM acquired St. Michael's Hospital in Shanghai to provide international standard care to foreigners living and working in Shanghai. In 2010, APM acquired two hospitals in Shanghai: Honkou Women's and Children's Hospital, and Hengshan Hospital. In 2011, APM acquired the Health Trends Medical Group, again enlarging its network. In 2012, Puhua International Hospitals-TEDA opened in Tianjin to care for cardiovascular-related illnesses in conjunction with the TEDA International Cardiac Hospital.

== Bain Capital, LLC Acquisition ==
On March 16, 2016, Bain Capital announced that it had acquired a large majority stake in Asia Pacific Medical Group from the existing shareholders of the private company. The $150 million investment includes funds for expansion. Bain Capital indicated that the $150 million investment will help fund APMG's expansion in China. The acquisition is funded in large part by APMG's multiple sites throughout China, and its ability to participate in both China's senior care market, and its healthcare market, by virtue of its rehabilitation facilities.
