= OASIS International Hospital =

Geography
- Location: 9 Jiuxianqiao Beilu, Chaoyang District, 北京市朝阳区酒仙桥北路9号, Beijing, China

Organisation
- Care system: Private
- Type: General

Services
- Emergency department: 24-hour ER
- Beds: 60

History
- Founded: 2012

Links
- Website: http://www.oasishealth.cn/
- Lists: Hospitals in China
- Other links: List of hospitals in Beijing

OASIS International Hospital (Chinese: 北京明德医院; pinyin: Běijīng Míngdé Yīyuàn) is a full service private hospital in Beijing, People's Republic of China. OASIS opened in February 2012.

== Overview ==
OASIS International Hospital offers a full range of medical treatment, imaging, and laboratory work, designed to meet international standards of care. The hospital is located north of Beijing's 798 Art District in a 15,000 m^{2} facility with 60 inpatient beds and 24/7 emergency care. Its staff are multilingual and its doctors are internationally trained. Languages spoken by doctors include: English, Chinese, Japanese, French, Spanish, German, Dutch, Korean, and Persian. The hospital has direct billing with most major international insurance providers.
