= Beijing Chaoyang Hospital =

Beijing Chao-Yang Hospital (北京朝阳医院)
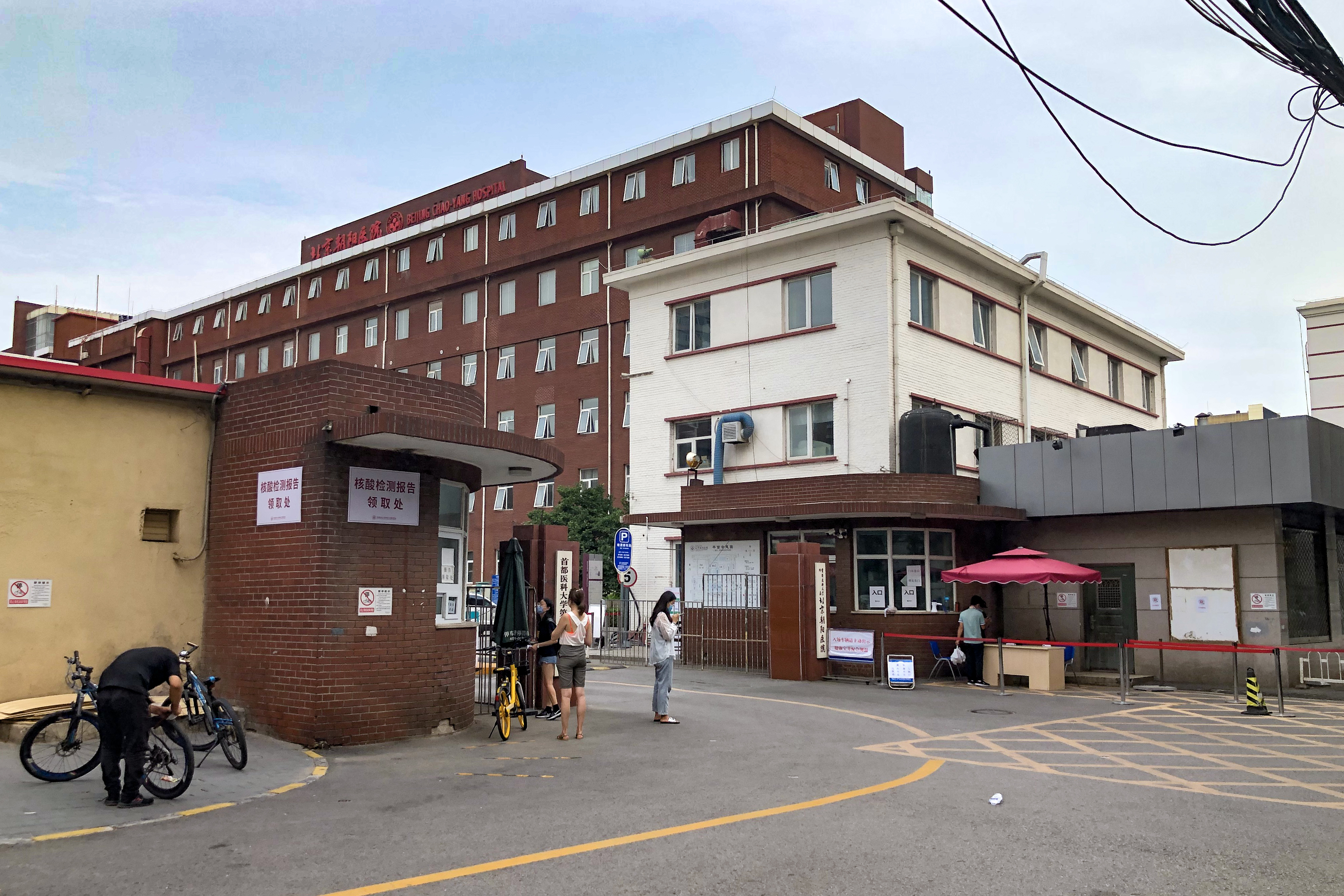

Geography
- Location: Beijing, Chaoyang District
- Coordinates: 39.924516°N 116.446924°E

Organisation
- Affiliated university: Beijing Municipal Healthcare Bureau

History
- Founded: February 24, 1958.

Links
- Other links: List of hospitals in China

Beijing Chaoyang Hospital (simplified Chinese: 北京朝阳医院; traditional Chinese: 北京朝陽醫院; pinyin: Běijīng Cháoyáng Yīyuàn) is a hospital in Chaoyang District, Beijing. It is subordinate to the Beijing Municipal Healthcare Bureau. It is the third clinical hospital of the medical school of Capital Medical University. It has two campuses, the Main Campus and the Jingxi Campus, with a combined floor space of 210,000 square metres (2,300,000 sq ft) sitting on an area of 102,800 square metres (1,107,000 sq ft). The hospital has 3,600 medical and support staff members and room for 1,910 patients.

The hospital was founded on February 24, 1958.

== See also ==
- List of hospitals in Beijing
