= Peking University Hospital of Stomatology =

Peking University Hospital of Stomatology Chinese: 北京大学口腔医院
- Peking University Hospital of Stomatology Building

Geography
- Location: No. 22, Zhongguancun South Street, Haidian District, Beijing, China
- Coordinates: 39.95097°N 116.31887°E

Organisation
- Type: Specialist hospital
- Affiliated university: Peking University

History
- Founded: 1941

Links
- Website: ss.bjmu.edu.cn
- Lists: Hospitals in China

The Peking University Hospital of Stomatology is a Class III Grade A (3A) dentist hospital in Beijing under the administration of the National Health Commission of the People's Republic of China. Founded in 1941, the hospital is now a leader in stomatology and also undertakes the tasks of Peking University School of Stomatology, Peking University Institute of Stomatology, and a National Center for Stomatology, integrating medical treatment, education and research.

== History ==
In 1941, the affiliated hospital of the National Peking University Medical College was founded.

In 1955, the Department of Oral and Maxillofacial Surgery of the hospital was established, as one of the earliest in China.

In 1978, the Peking University Institute of Stomatology was founded in the hospital.

In 1981, the hospital was approved by the World Health Organization as a "WHO Collaborating Centre for Research and Training in Preventive Dentistry".

In 1984, the Hospital graduated the first PhD student in stomatology in China.

In 2021, China's first National Center for Stomatology was established at Peking University Hospital of Stomatology.

In 2024, the International Clinical Division was opened, with and area of nearly 6,000m² and 65 treatment units, as well as English language services.

In January 2026, Peking University School of Stomatology's joint construction of the National Medical Products Administration's Regulatory Science Innovation Research Base was approved.

In March 2026, the Peking University School of Stomatology's Huilongguan Outpatient Department was officially unveiled and put into use. It is the tenth outpatient department of the hospital in Beijing that is independently opened and operated.

== Campuses ==
Peking University Hospital of Stomatology has a number of campuses, including

Campus 1. Address: Xishiku, Xicheng District, Beijing, China;

Campus 2: No. 22 Zhongguancun South Avenue, Haidian District, Beijing;

Campus 3: Room 203, 2nd Floor, Gaode Building, Huayuan North Road, Haidian District, Beijing;

Campus 4: Beijing Central Business District;

Campus 5: International Dept: Room 305, Building A, Jia Hui International Center, Chaoyangmenwai, Chaoyang District, Beijing;

Sanya Campus: Sanya City, Hainan Province, China;

Huilongguan Campus: Huilongguan, Changping District, Beijing;

Shijingshan Campus: Shijingshan District, Beijing.

== Current situation ==
Peking University Hospital of Stomatology holds 1,047 dental chairs and 363 inpatient beds, serving over 2.26 million outpatients visits annually.

In scientific research, Peking University Hospital of Stomatology published 57 papers listed in Nature Index for the time frame of 1 July 2025 - 30 June 2026, ranking 111st globally and 44th in healthcare in China.

In the 2024 China Hospital and Specialty Reputation Ranking, Peking University Hospital of Stomatology ranked A+ (top-80) in the comprehensive hospital ranking, and 1st in Stomatology (Dentistry) nationally.

The hospital has built international partnerships with more than 40 dental schools in different countries.

== See also ==
- Peking University
- List of hospitals in China
- List of hospitals in Beijing
