= Anzhenmen station =

Beijing Subway station

Coordinates: 39°58′37″N 116°24′21″E

Anzhenmen 安贞门
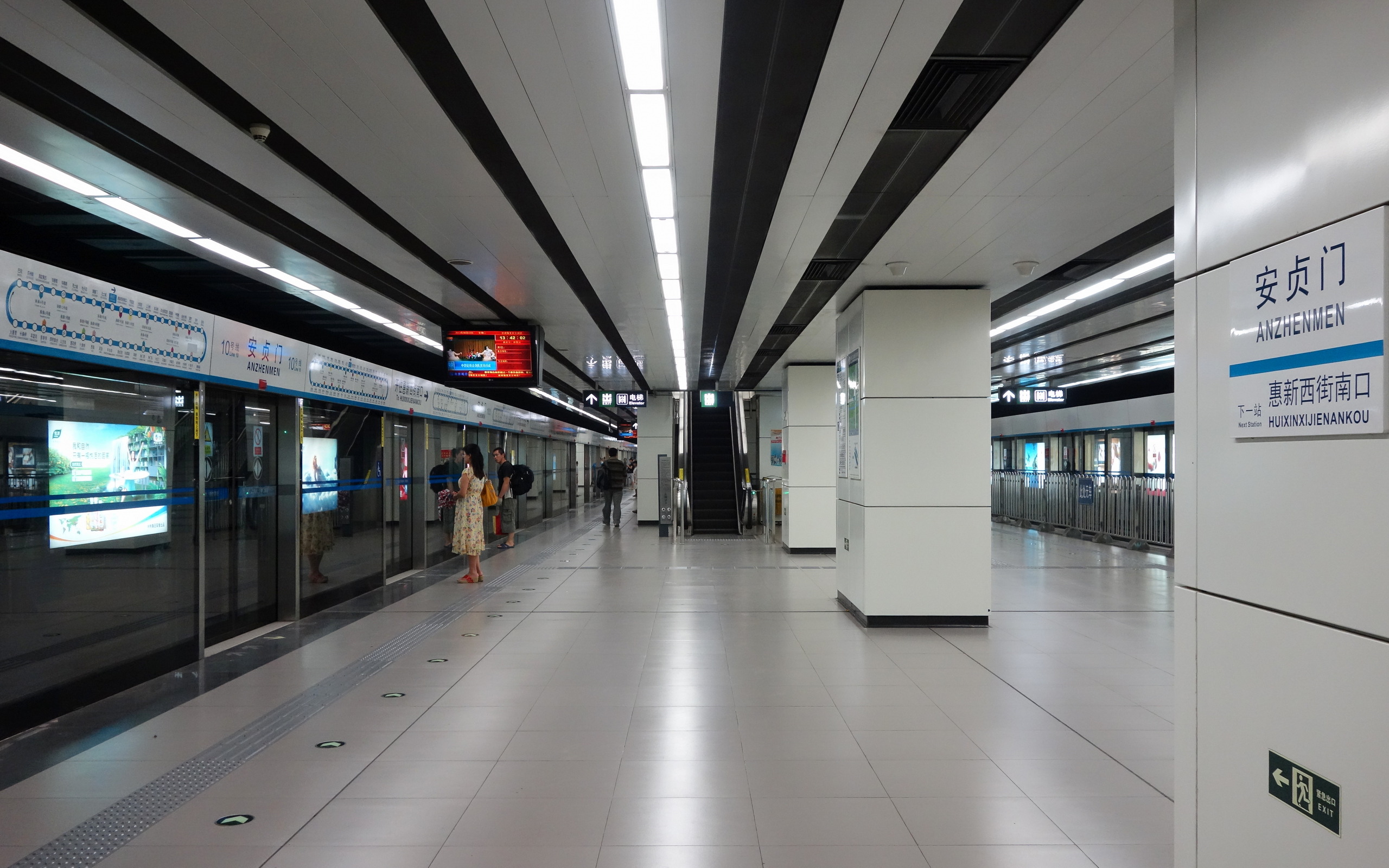
- Clockwise platform

General information
- Location: Beitucheng East Road and Anding Road (安定路); Chaoyang District, Beijing; China
- Operator: Beijing Mass Transit Railway Operation Corporation Limited
- Line: Line 10
- Platforms: 3 (1 island platform and 1 side platform)
- Tracks: 3

Construction
- Structure type: Underground
- Accessible: Yes

History
- Opened: 19 July 2008

Services
| Preceding station | Beijing Subway | Following station |
|---|---|---|
| Beitucheng outer loop / anticlockwise | Line 10 | Huixin Xijie Nankou inner loop / clockwise |
Location
- Location within Beijing

Anzhenmen station (simplified Chinese: 安贞门站; traditional Chinese: 安貞門站; pinyin: Ānzhēnmén Zhàn) is a subway station on Line 10 of the Beijing Subway.

== Station layout ==
Anzhenmen station has an underground island and side platform. One of the tracks is unused.

== Exits ==
The station has 4 exits, lettered A, B, C, and D. Exit C is accessible.

== Gallery ==
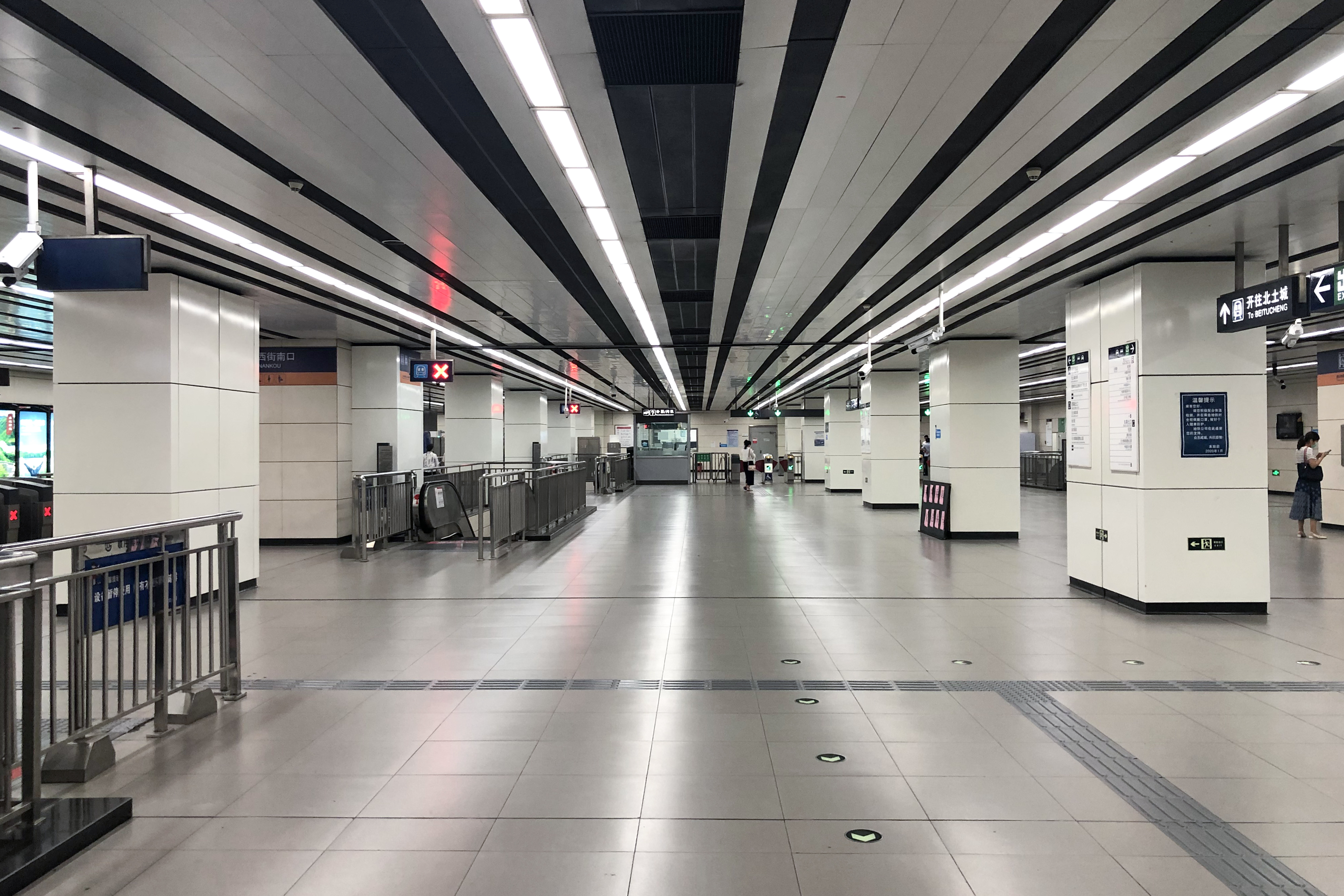
Concourse

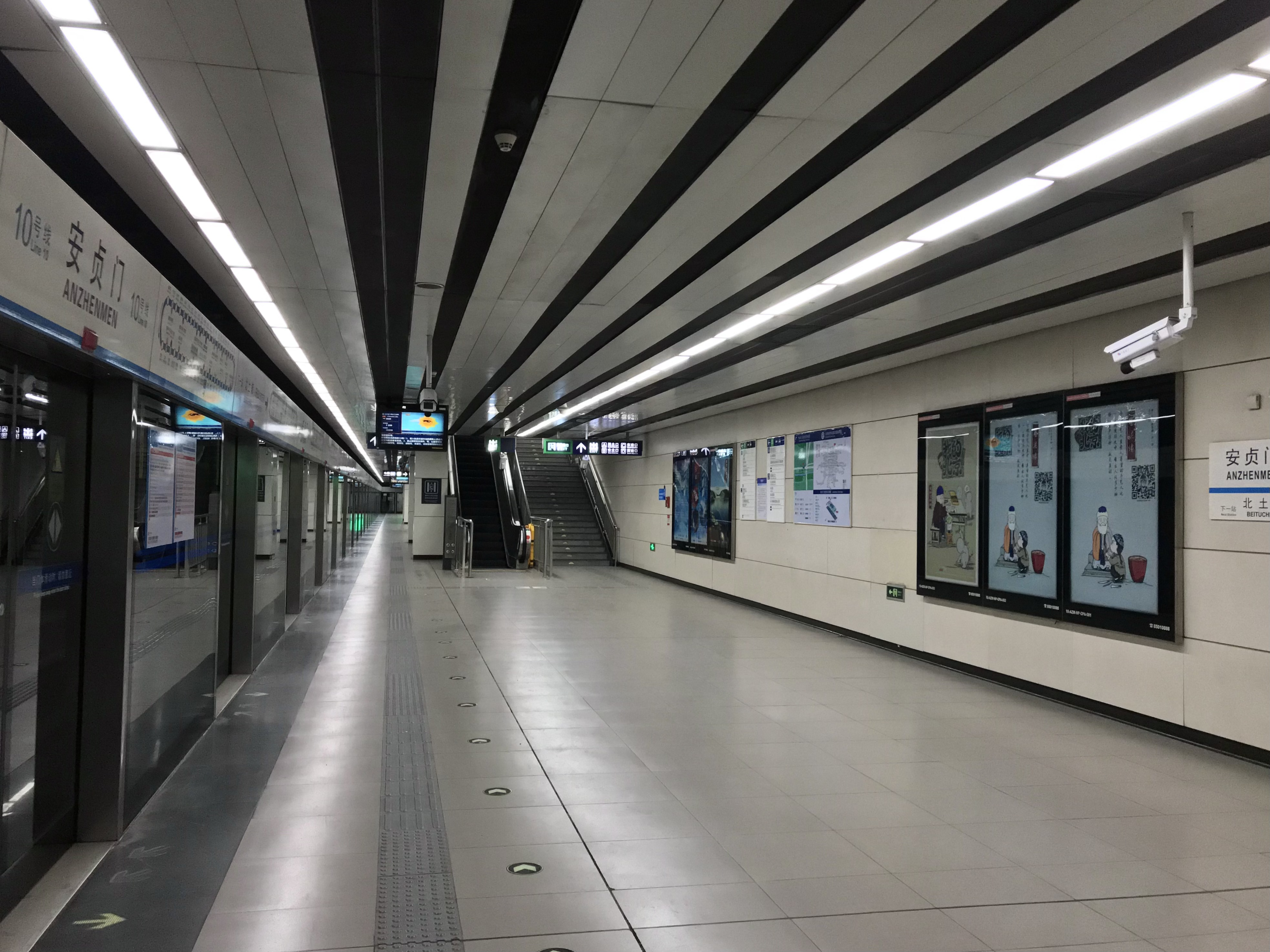
Counterclockwise platform
