= Sekwa Eye Hospital =

Geography
- Location: Beijing, China
- Coordinates: 39.958676°N 116.375207°E

Organisation
- Type: Specialist

Services
- Speciality: Eye surgery

History
- Opened: 2004

Links
- Lists: Hospitals in China

Sekwa Eye Hospital is one of the pioneer private hospitals in modern China. It was founded by a group of eye physicians and surgeons in Beijing in 2004. With the support of the Norwegian FK Foundation (Fredskorpset) and later the Research Council of Norway, Sekwa has built partnerships with institutions from several countries, including Thailand, Mongolia, Nepal, Bangladesh and Norway. With these partnerships, Sekwa has built an international environment for its medical service, training and research, and has become one of the very few hospitals in China with the privilege of independent international cooperation, issued by the Administration of Foreign Experts of the State of the People's Republic of China . The hospital has been appointed as a specialized eye care center in Beijing and a regional eye center under a national program of Ministry of Science and Technology of China since 2007. In a Reuters' interview in 2008, the Director of Sekwa expressed different opinions about the serious eye health problems of the school children in China and questioned the rational of the national program of eye massage exercises, which has brought attentions about the problems of Chinese education system and the practice of traditional Chinese medicine in China
