= Huixin Xijie Beikou station =

Beijing Subway station

Coordinates: 39.9879°N 116.4170°E

Huixin Xijie Beikou 惠新西街北口
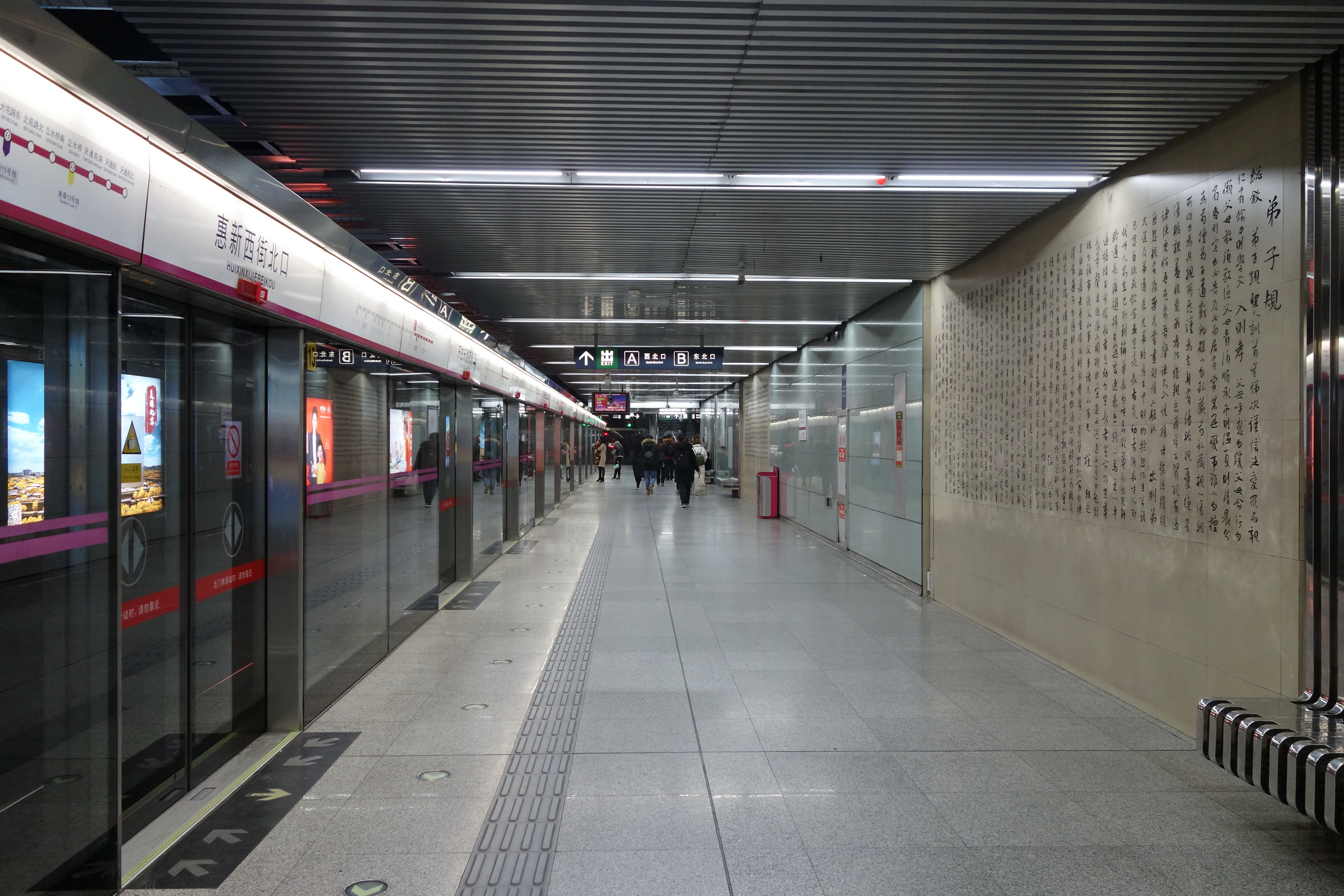
- Northbound platform

General information
- Other names: Huixinxiqiao (惠新西桥)
- Location: Huixin West Bridge (惠新西桥), intersection of Huixin West Street (惠新西街) and North 4th Ring Road; Chaoyang District, Beijing; China
- Operator: Beijing Mass Transit Railway Operation Corporation Limited
- Line: Line 5
- Platforms: 2 (2 side platforms)
- Tracks: 2

Construction
- Structure type: Underground
- Accessible: Yes

History
- Opened: October 7, 2007

Services
Preceding station	Beijing Subway	Following station
Datunludong towards Tiantongyuanbei	Line 5	Huixin Xijie Nankou towards Songjiazhuang
Location
- Location within Beijing

Huixin Xijie Beikou station (Chinese: 惠新西街北口站; pinyin: Huìxīn Xījiē Běikǒu zhàn) is a station on Line 5 of the Beijing Subway. The station opened on October 7, 2007.

== Station layout ==
The station has 2 underground side platforms.

== Exits ==
There are 3 exits, lettered A, B, and C. Exit C is accessible.
