= Beijing United Family Hospital =

Beijing United Family Hospital and Clinics

Geography
- Location: Beijing, Chaoyang, China
- Coordinates: 39.975068°N 116.485718°E

Organisation
- Care system: Private
- Type: International Standard Joint-Venture

Services
- Standards: Joint Commission International accreditation
- Beds: 50

History
- Founded: 1997

Links
- Website: www.unitedfamilyhospitals.com
- Lists: Hospitals in China
- Other links: List of hospitals in Beijing

Beijing United Family Hospital and Clinics (BJU, Chinese: 北京和睦家医院) was the first international standard hospital established in China. It opened in 1997 as a joint venture between China International, Inc. and the Chinese Academy of Medical Sciences. Beijing United Family was the first foreign-invested hospital to operate in China. In 2009, the hospital had 50 beds and sees over 2,500 patients every week with its 17 departments and services.

The facility provides 24-hour emergency and intensive care services alongside multiple medical departments.

Beijing United Family was the first hospital in China to receive accreditation from the United States-based, nonprofit, Joint Commission International (JCI).

The hospital is staffed by a team of over 100 doctors from 15 different countries, China, Australia, Belgium, Canada, France, Germany, Italy, Japan, Nepal, Philippines, Singapore, South Korea, Switzerland, the United Kingdom, and the United States. These specialists are supported by a team of English-speaking nurses. BJU has over 500 support workers. In 2010, the hospital opened a new United Family Liangma Clinic outside the main hospital.

Beijing United Family Hospital has sister hospitals in Shanghai, Tianjin, Qingdao, Guangzhou and Ulaanbaatar, Mongolia.

== Background ==
Beijing United Family Hospital was started by Roberta Lipson, who earned her MBA from Columbia University in New York City and worked for a few years for a U.S. pharmaceutical company, before moving to Beijing in 1979. Two years later, she partnered with fellow New Yorker Elyse Beth Silverberg to co-found U.S.-China Industrial Exchange, the company that would later change its name to Chindex. In its early years, the company sold not only medical equipment, but a wide variety of other products, ranging from 70-ton mining trucks to geothermal energy equipment to mushroom growing systems.

Steady growth led to a listing on the Nasdaq Exchange in 1993, after which Chindex narrowed its focus to the medical sector alone. Through her experience distributing medical equipment to hospitals across China, Lipson stated that infrastructure was not the sole element required for institutional improvement. 'It became increasingly apparent,' says Lipson, 'that while Chinese hospitals were moving towards an international standard on the hardware front, something was still missing.' Just before the birth of her first child, Lipson accompanied a pregnant Chinese friend as she gave birth at a Beijing hospital. Although it was one of China's premiere obstetrics facilities at the time, the experience left much to be desired. 'Shortly after that, I had the opportunity to return to the United States to have my own child and experience the U.S. approach to labor and delivery, and the vast differences just seemed unfair to me,' Roberta Lipson recalls. Following that experience, Roberta Lipson and Elyse began exploring ways to bring not only the hardware but also the 'soft' technologies of healthcare to China. They felt that many aspects of international standard healthcare could be brought to China, such as a philosophy of patient-centered care, a service mentality, systems management, and quality control. After examining their options, Roberta and Elyse decided the only way to make it happen was to do it themselves. They also realized that their many years of selling medical equipment in China - everything from ultrasound to patient monitors to MRI machines—had given Chindex a keen understanding of the nation's healthcare system and an extensive network of relationships at all levels of the Chinese medical establishment. And despite tough regulatory restrictions on foreign medical service operations in China, they saw an opportunity to leverage their experience and their advantages.

== Western-style healthcare in China ==
They first thought about a Western-style healthcare facility in early 1992, beginning a lengthy process with complex negotiations over approvals for a foreign-invested hospital; design and completion of the building itself; hiring and training of staff; acquisition and installation of equipment; and myriad other details.

The first project of its kind, Beijing United Family Hospital and Clinics (BJU) opened its doors and treated its first patient at the end of 1997. Structured as a joint venture between Chindex and Chinese Academy of Medical Sciences, BJU provided an alternative model to the existing domestic healthcare offerings in China at the time.

BJU subsequently established two satellite clinics in Beijing.
