= Huixin Xijie Nankou station =

Beijing Subway station

Coordinates: 39.977121°N 116.417537°E

Huixin Xijie Nankou 惠新西街南口
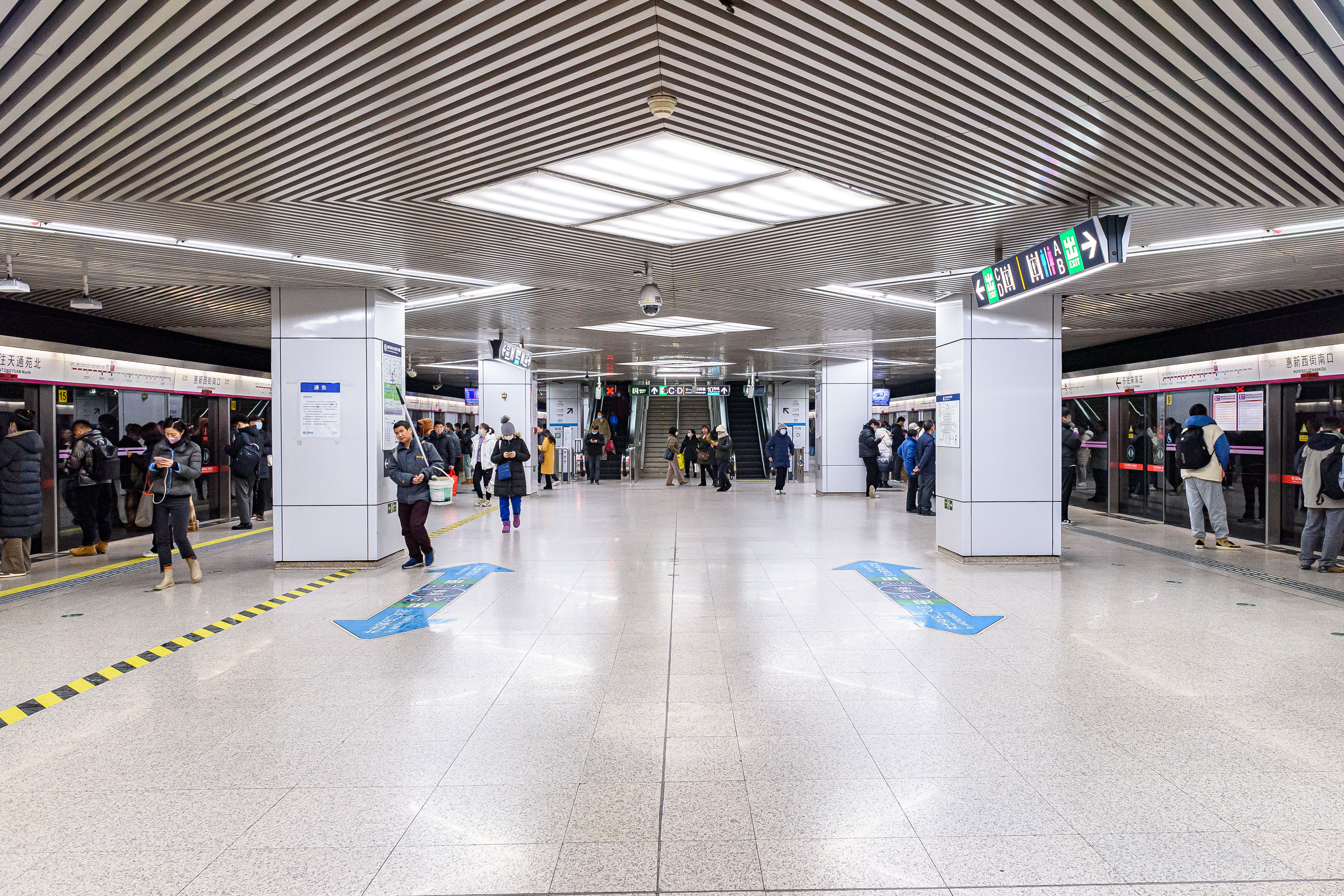
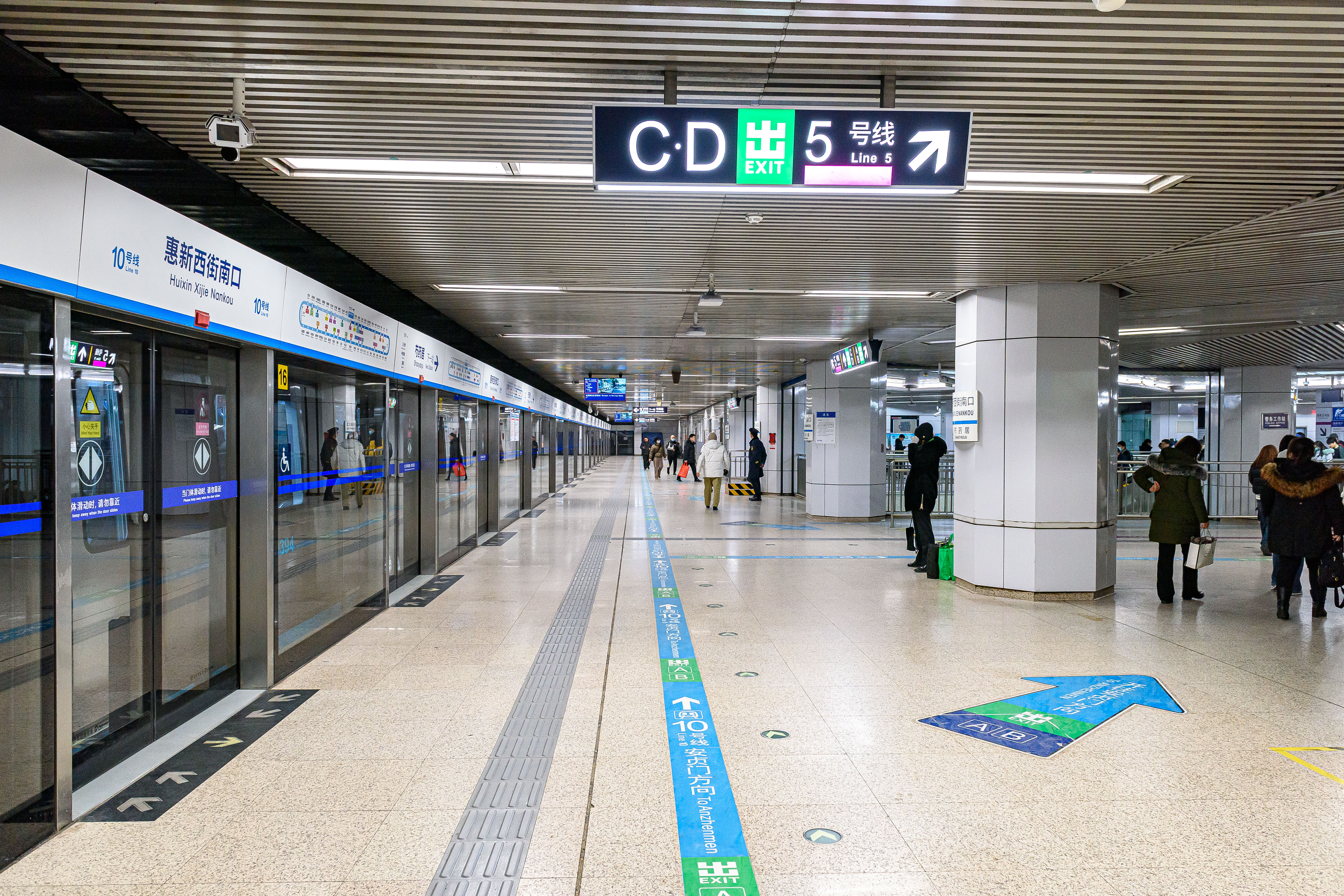
- Line 5 platform Line 10 clockwise platform

General information
- Other names: Beituchengdonglu (北土城东路)
- Location: Huixin West Street (惠新西街) and Beitucheng East Road (北土城东路); Chaoyang District, Beijing; China
- Operator: Beijing Mass Transit Railway Operation Corporation Limited
- Lines: Line 5; Line 10
- Platforms: 4 (1 island platform and 2 side platforms)
- Tracks: 4

Construction
- Structure type: Underground
- Accessible: Yes

History
- Opened: October 7, 2007; 18 years ago (Line 5); July 19, 2008; 18 years ago (Line 10)

Services
Preceding station	Beijing Subway	Following station
Huixin Xijie Beikou towards Tiantongyuanbei	Line 5	Heping Xiqiao towards Songjiazhuang
Anzhenmen outer loop / anticlockwise	Line 10	Shaoyaoju inner loop / clockwise
Location
- Location within Beijing

Huixin Xijie Nankou station (Chinese: 惠新西街南口站; pinyin: Huìxīn Xījiē Nánkǒu zhàn) is a station on Line 5 and Line 10 of the Beijing Subway. The station handled a peak passenger traffic of 241,700 people on May 5, 2013.

The two parts of the station opened separately: Line 5 and part of the concourse opened October 7, 2007, while the rest opened along with Line 10 on July 19, 2008.

== Station layout ==
Both the line 5 and 10 stations are underground. The line 5 station has an island platform, while the line 10 station has 2 side platforms.

== Exits ==
There are 4 exits, lettered A, B, C, and D. Exits B and C are accessible.

== Accidents ==
On November 6, 2014, a woman was killed when she tried to board the train at Huixinxijie Nankou Station on Beijing Subway's Line 5. She became trapped between the train door and the platform edge door and was crushed to death by the departing train. The accident happened on the second day of APEC China 2014 meetings in the city during which the municipal government has banned cars from the roads on alternate days to ease congestion and reduce pollution during the summit – measures which the capital's transport authorities have estimated would lead to an extra one million extra passengers on the subway every day.

== Gallery ==
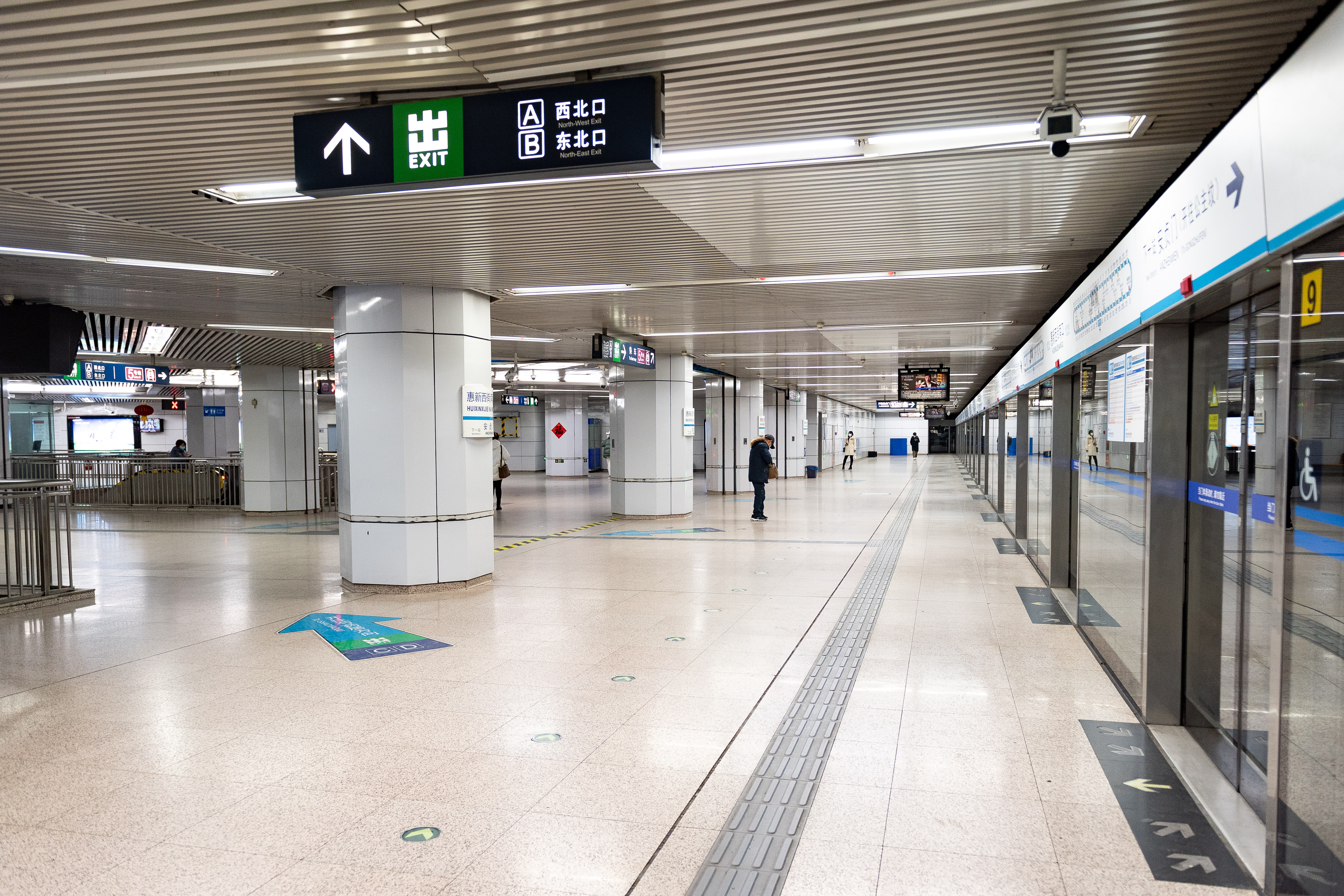
Line 10 counter-clockwise platform

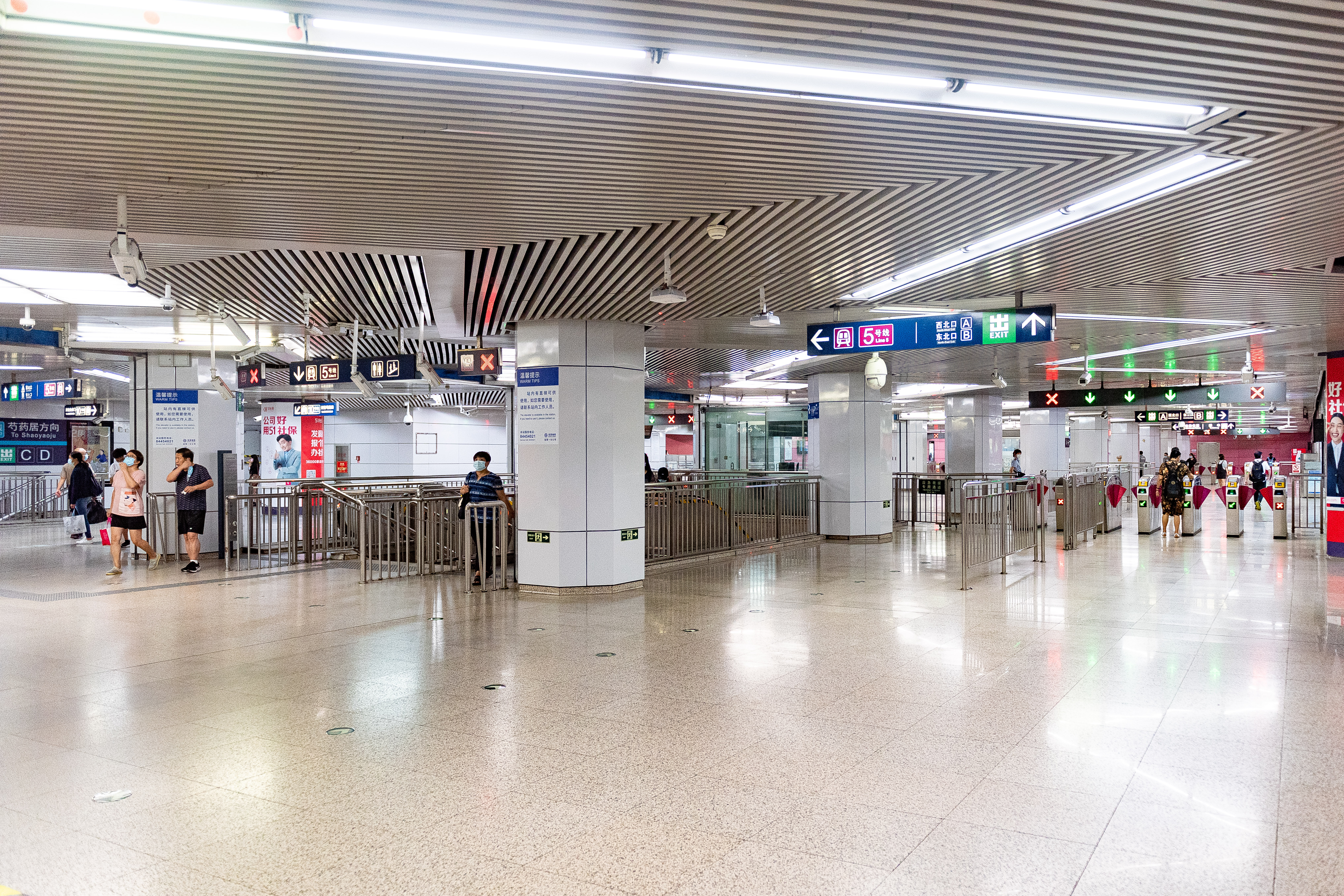
North concourse

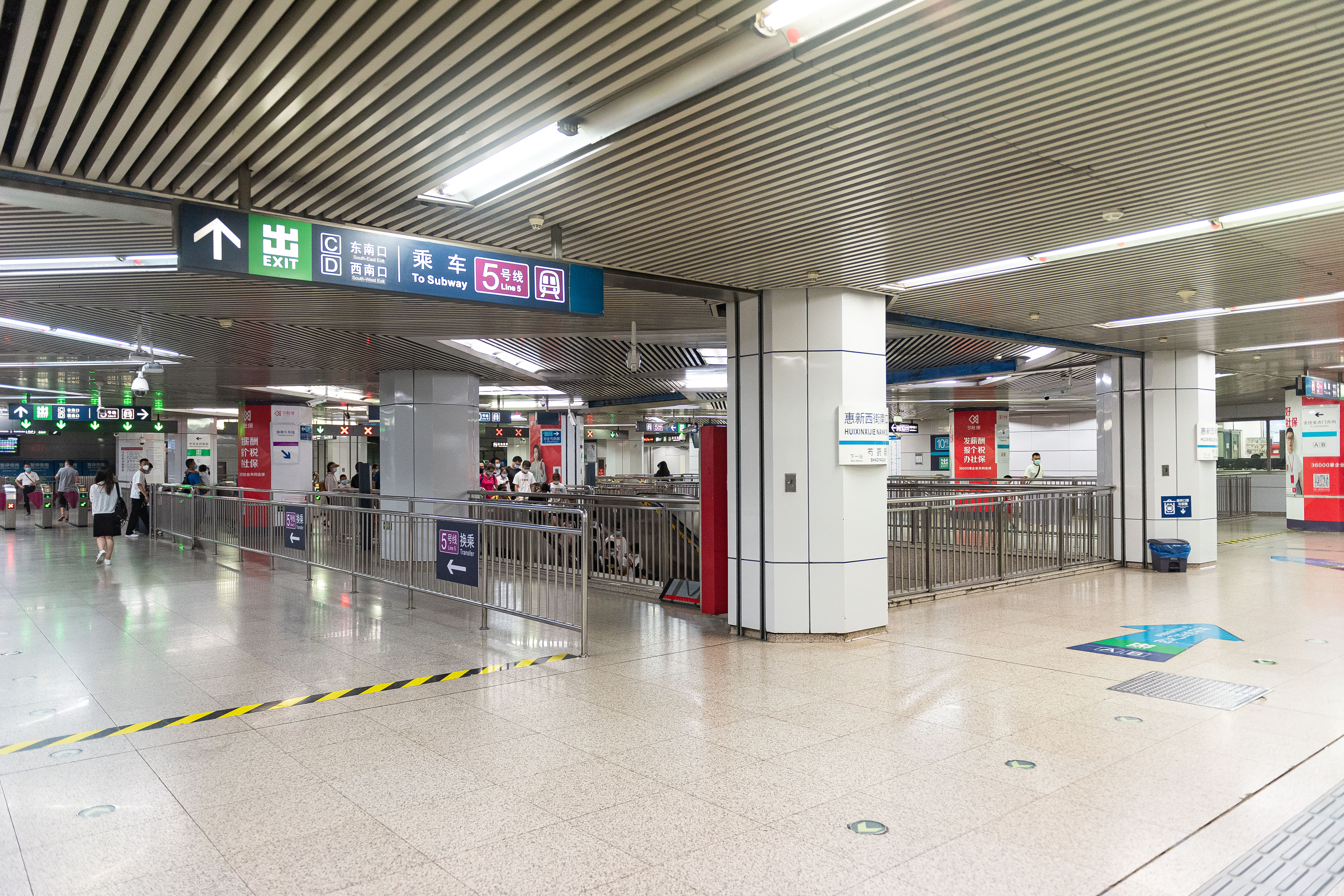
South concourse
