= Beijing Hospital of Traditional Chinese Medicine =

Hospital in Dongcheng, Beijing, China

Geography
- Location: 23 Meishuguan Back St, Beijing, Dongcheng District, China
- Coordinates: 39.906388°N 116.265471°E

Organisation
- Care system: Public
- Type: Teaching, Specialist
- Affiliated university: Beijing University of Chinese Medicine

Services
- Beds: 2,500

History
- Founded: 1956

Links
- Website: en.tcm-china.org
- Lists: Hospitals in China

Chinese name
- Simplified Chinese: 首都医科大学附属北京中医医院
- Traditional Chinese: 首都醫科大學附屬北京中醫醫院
Transcriptions
Standard Mandarin
- Hanyu Pinyin: Shǒudū Yīkē Dàxué Fùshǔ Běijīng Zhōngyī Yīyuàn

The Beijing Hospital of Traditional Chinese Medicine is a large traditional Chinese medicine hospital network headquartered in Beijing, China. The hospital network has approximately 2,500 beds, three institutes, and centers—the Institute of Traditional Chinese Medicine, Zhao Bingnan's Medical Center of Dermatosis, and Beijing International Training Center for Acupuncture—and 26 clinical departments.

The hospital network is listed as one of the largest in the world regarding available beds. Its flagship location is the Capital Medical University Beijing Hospital of Traditional Chinese Medicine in Beijing.

== History ==
The hospital network was founded in 1956 with a focus on traditional Chinese medicine (TCM). The hospital uses TCM to treat diseases "of the spleen and stomach, cough, asthma, insomnia, diabetes, enuresis, chronic fatigue syndrome, facial paralysis, protrusion of lumbar intervertebral disc, sciatica, dysmenorrhea, acne, and fatty liver".

Beijing International Acupuncture Training Center, a subsidiary of Beijing Hospital of Traditional Chinese Medicine, has been visited and studied by roughly 30,000 people from over 80 countries.

In 2017, the network president, Liu Quanqing, warned against using "anti-smog" herbal teas to combat smog-related illness, stating it is ineffective and "may even cause additional health risks." Liu warned that "anti-smog" tea contained "ingredients that are medicines and can't be used as food, which may cause health problems if taken for a long time." He also "suggested remedies for cleaning the lungs, such as eating kelp, radish or wood-ear fungus", were not genuine.

A joint venture involving the Beijing Hospital of Traditional Chinese Medicine was set up by Ming Yi Guan as the first "treatment facility outside China."

== See also ==
- Beijing University of Chinese Medicine
