= Wu Yingkai =

Wu Yingkai (also spelled as Yingkai Wu, Chinese: 吴英恺; 8 May 1910 – 13 November 2013) was a Chinese epidemiologist and academician of the Chinese Academy of Sciences.

== Biography ==
Wu was born on 8 May 1910 in Xinmin, Fengtian, Qing Dynasty (now Xinmin, Liaoning). He was a Manchu. In 1927, he was admitted to the Shenyang Xiaoheyan Medical College. He began his career in medicine and graduated from Mukden Medical College in 1933. Soon after, he began lecturing at Peking Union Medical College (PUMC) and started researching pioneering surgery. In 1940, he became the first Chinese surgeon to resect a carcinoma of the oesophagus.

In 1941, he came to Washington University in St. Louis to study thoracic surgery for two years. in 1943, he returned to China during the war against Japan and worked at the Central Hospital of Chongqing. In 1948, he returned to Peking Union Medical College as director of the department of surgery. During this period, he performed the first operation to correct a birth defect when the ductus arteriosus failed to close after birth in China, and the first pericardiectomy for constrictive pericarditis in China.

After the founding of the People's Republic of China, he continued to serve as professor and director of the Peking Union Medical College, and in 1956 he became president and chief of surgery of the Chest Hospital of the People's Liberation Army, which was transferred to the Fuwai Hospital of the Chinese Academy of Medical Sciences in 1958, where he continued to serve as president. In 1956, he joined the Chinese Communist Party and was a deputy to the 1st, 2nd and 3rd National People's Congress, and a member to the 5th and 6th Chinese People's Political Consultative Conference.

From 1958, he became interested in the epidemiology and prevention of cardiovascular diseases, and continued his research even during the Cultural Revolution. He founded the Beijing Institute of Heart, Lung and Blood Vessel Diseases and established related investigative programs. Later, he started to work with WHO to get the program involved in the Multinational Monitoring of Trends and Determinants in Cardiovascular Disease (MONICA).

He died on 13 November 2003 in Beijing at the age of 93 years.

== Personal life ==
Wu married Shiyan Li in the 1940s. They had a daughter and two sons, and four grandchildren.
