= Beijing Tongren Hospital =

Hospital in Dongcheng, Beijing, China

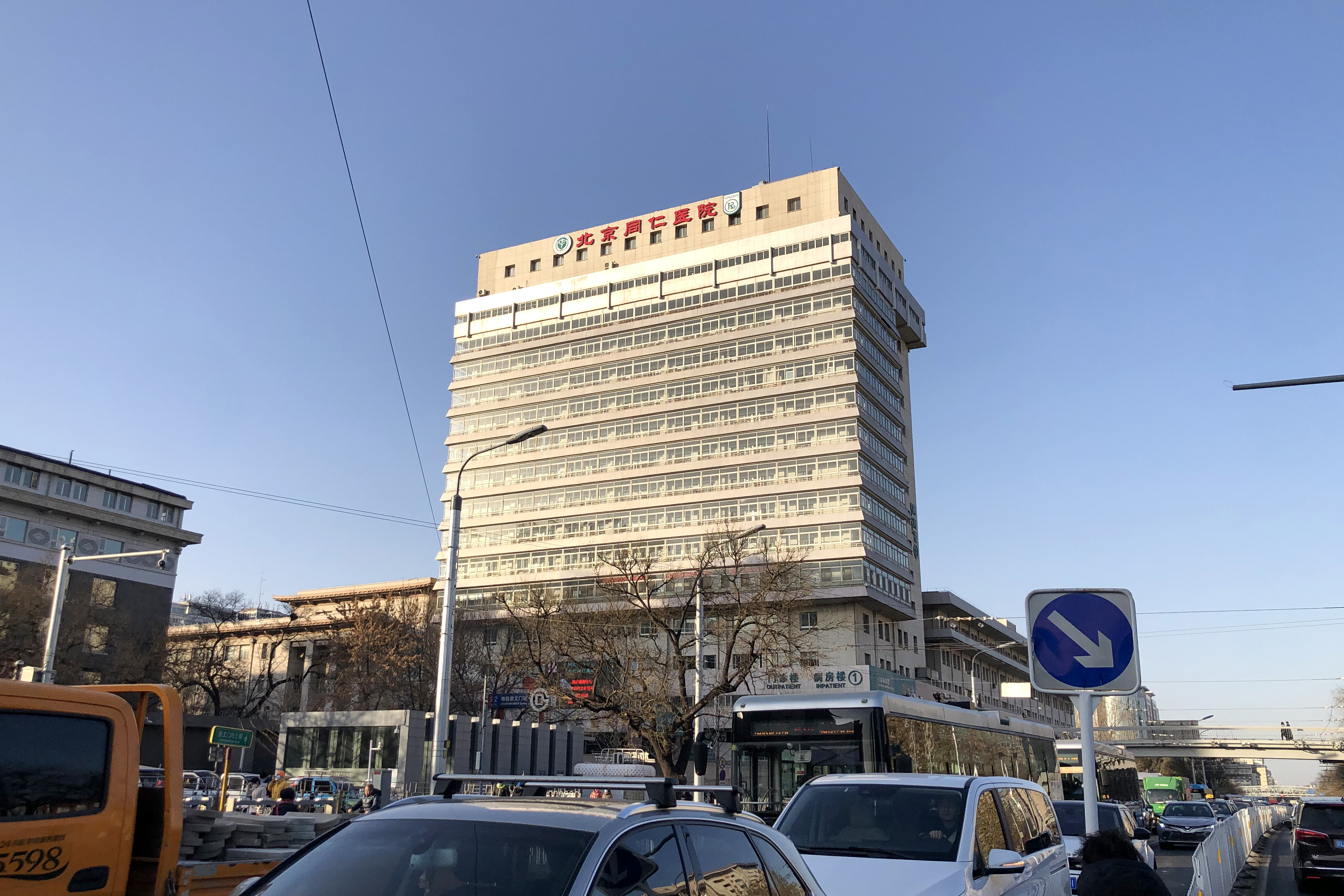

Geography
- Location: 1 Dongjiaominxiang Alley, Dongcheng District, Beijing, China
- Coordinates: 39.90132°N 116.41101°E

Organisation
- Type: Teaching, District General
- Affiliated university: Capital Medical University

History
- Founded: 1886

Links
- Website: http://www.trhos.com/english/indexe.asp

Beijing Tongren Hospital (Chinese: 北京同仁医院) is a public hospital which specializes in ophthalmology and otolaryngology (ear, nose and throat medicine). The hospital is now a teaching hospital affiliated with the Capital Medical University.

Beijing Tongren Hospital was established by American Methodist Episcopal Mission in the 19th century.

Tongren Hospital was the site of the first isolation and identification of Chlamydia trachomatis, the causal agent of blinding trachoma, in 1957.

The hospital has had to take steps, including registering its name as a trademark, in order to protect its reputation against people fraudulently using the "Tongren" title.
