= China Rehabilitation Research Center =

Chinese medical research center

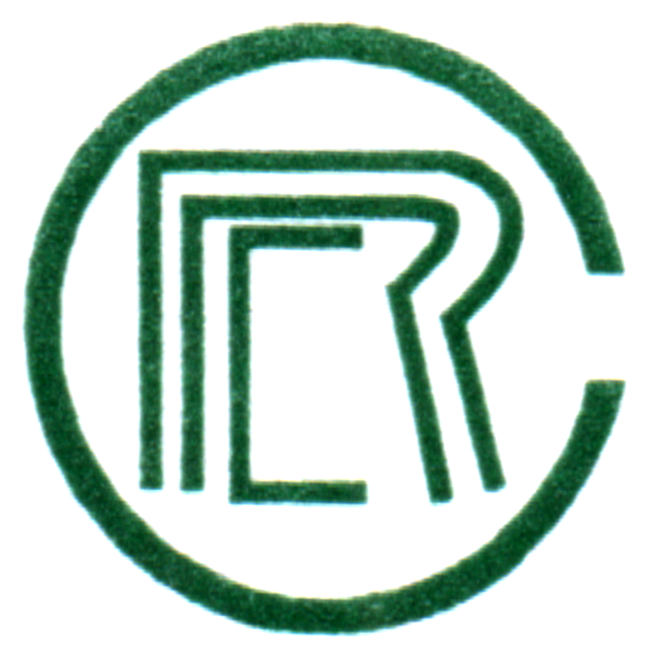

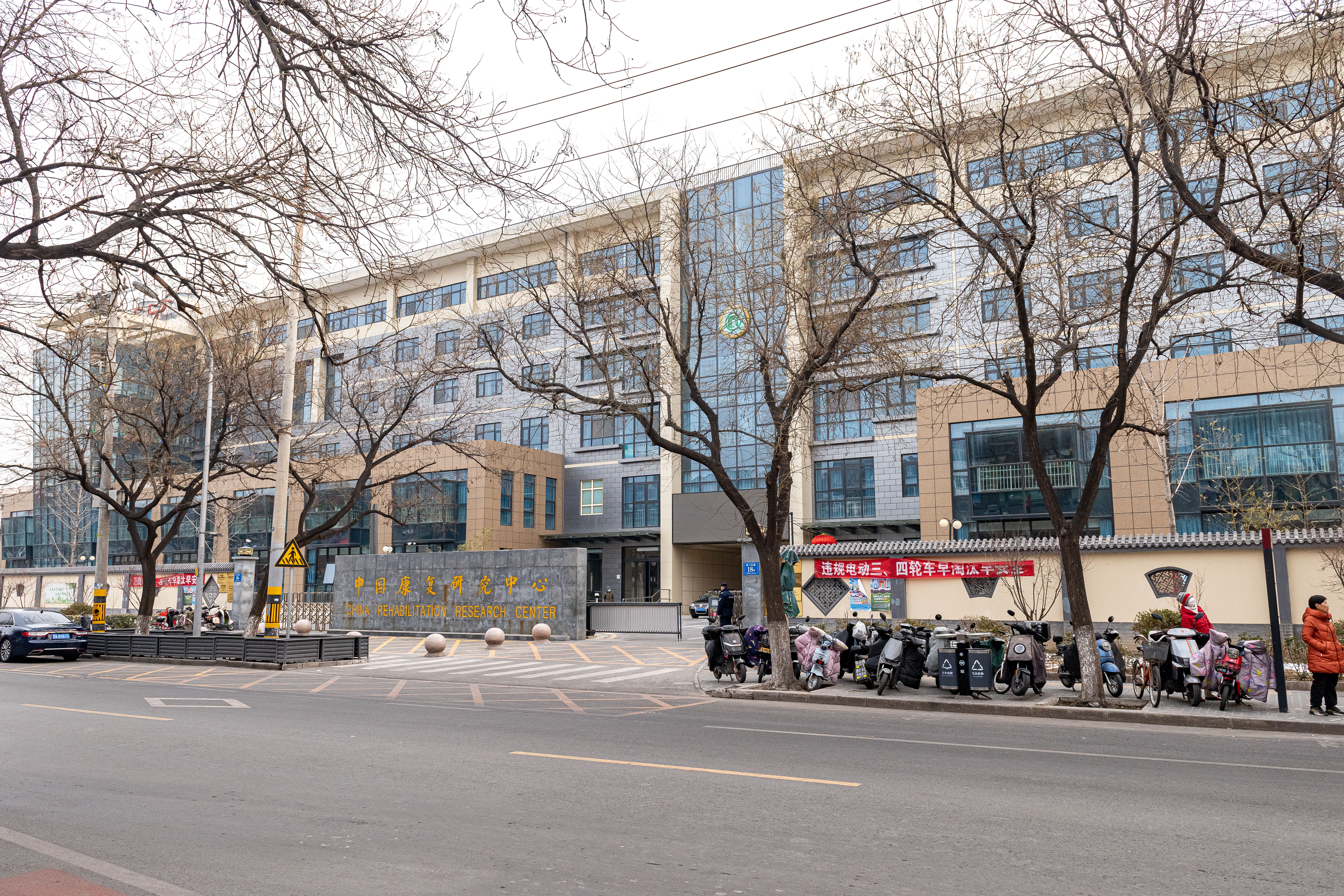
The China Rehabilitation Research Center in February 2024

China Rehabilitation Research Center (CRRC) (Chinese: 中国康复研究中心) is a Chinese medical research center under the China Disabled Persons' Federation in Majiapu Subdistrict, Fengtai District, Beijing. The Pacific Business News said the CRRC "is considered one of China's pre-eminent rehabilitation hospitals". It has 700 hospital beds and cares for roughly 300,000 patients every year.

== History ==
The research center was established in 1988. It is the first rehabilitation center in China and is the only tertiary hospital in China that has rehabilitation as its distinguishing focus. Located on facilities with construction area of 120,000 square meters. Part of the research center are Beijing Boai Hospital, School of Rehabilitation Medicine, Rehabilitation Basic Medicine Research Institute, Rehabilitation Engineering Research Institute, Rehabilitation Information Research Institute and CDPF Social Service Guidance Center. The research center is structured into three departments: Department of Anesthesiology, Department of Chemistry, Department of Endocrinology. The center has hosted more than 40 international conferences including the 42nd International Spinal Symposium. The CCRC has trained over 100,000 people. It has had exchanges with International University of Health and Welfare and Hong Kong Polytechnic University.
