= Department of Neurology, Xuanwu hospital =

Hospital department in China

The department of neurology, Xuanwu hospital (宣武医院神经内科) is a hospital department that was established in 1968. It was the first national research center on neurology and neurosurgery, and it has been nationally recognized as the premier center for the research and treatment of neurological disorders and neurosurgical diseases in China.

== Doctors ==
Its faculty members include over 70 professional MD and Ph.D. staff members. The clinical and research programs of the institute cover all of the major categories of neurological diseases and methods, including epilepsy, stroke, neuromuscular diseases, memory disorders, movement disorders, demyelinating diseases, peripheral nerves disorders, neuro-ICU, regenerative medicine center, integrated Chinese traditional and modern medicine, neurophysiology and Beijing consultation center of neurological disorders. It also has a proud tradition of training academic leaders and practitioners of neurology. Graduates of its educational program can be found in the medical centers and hospitals around the country.

Each day, it provides outpatient services to nearly 1,000 patients, who come from places around the country. Since the 1970s, it has been the national base for advanced studies of neurological physicians.
