= Beijing University of Chinese Medicine =

Public university in Beijing, China

- 北京中医药大学
- Former name: Beijing College of Chinese Medicine (北京中医学院)
- Type: Public
- Established: 1956; 70 years ago
- Location: Beijing, China; 39.96985°N 116.42213°E
- Campus: 268 acres
- Website: www.bucm.edu.cn

Chinese name
- Simplified Chinese: 北京中医药大学
- Traditional Chinese: 北京中醫藥大學
Transcriptions
Standard Mandarin
- Hanyu Pinyin: Běijīng Zhōngyīyào Dàxué

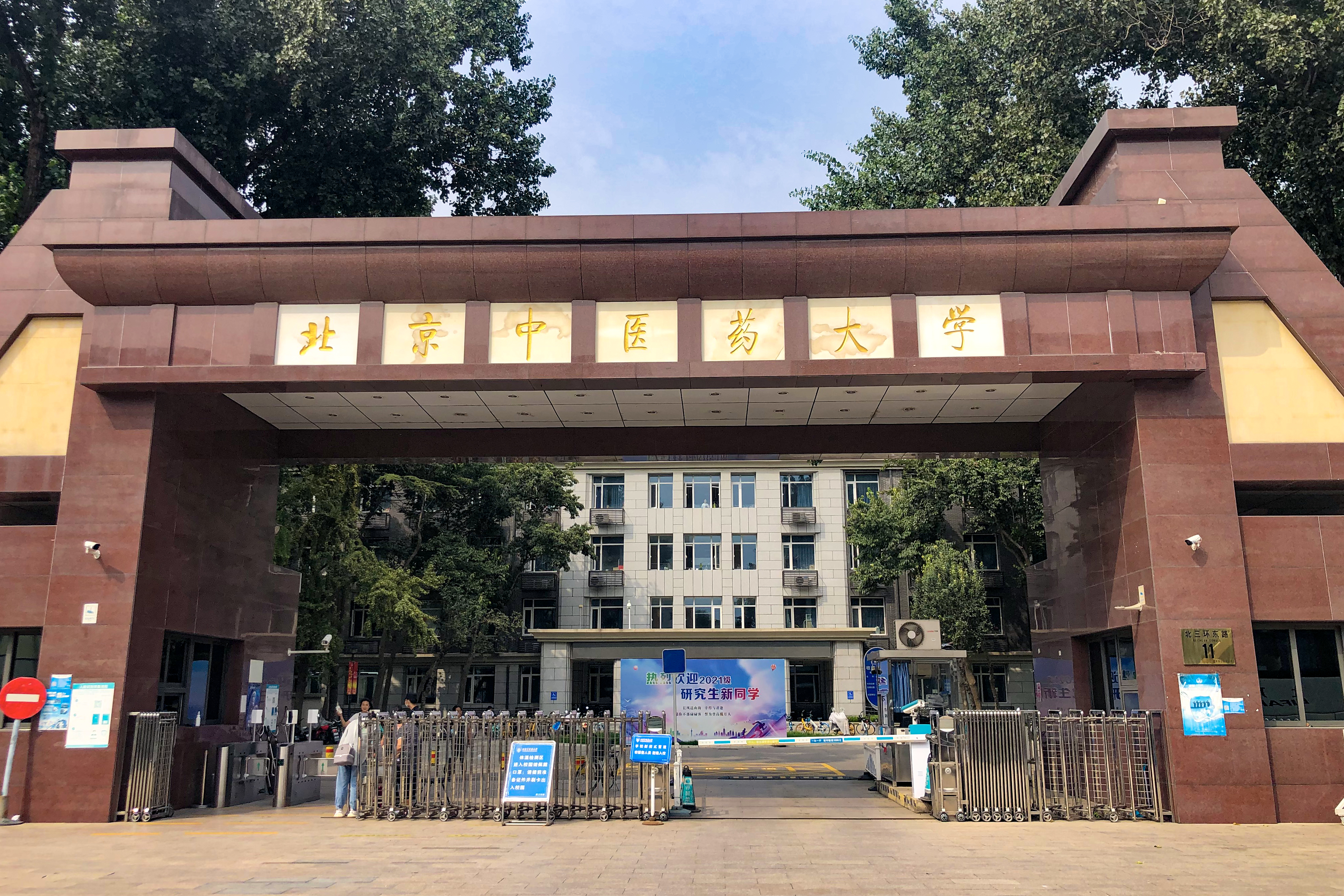
Gate

The Beijing University of Chinese Medicine (BUCM, Chinese: 北京中医药大学) is a public university in China. Founded in 1956, it is one of the first traditional Chinese medical institutions for higher learning in China. The university is affiliated with the Ministry of Education. It is part of Project 211 and the Double First-Class Construction.

Beijing University of Chinese Medicine operates across three campuses: the Heping Street Campus, Wangjing Campus, and Liangxiang Campus. Collectively, these campuses span an area of 268 acres (approximately 108 hectares).

== History ==
Founded in 1956 as Beijing College of Chinese Medicine (BCCM, 北京中医学院). Renamed to Beijing University of Chinese Medicine (BUCM, 北京中医药大学) in 1963.

The former Beijing University of Chinese Medicine and the former Beijing College of Acupuncture, Orthopedics and Traumatology merged into the new Beijing University of Chinese Medicine on July 31, 2000, and became a priority university directly under the supervision of the Ministry of Education.

== Colleges and departments ==
The current BUCM lists the following colleges and departments:

- School of Traditional Chinese Medicine
- School of Chinese Materia Medica
- School of Life Sciences
- School of Acupuncture-moxibustion and Tuina
- Qi-huang Chinese Medicine School (bachelor-doctorate programs)
- School of Management
- School of Nursing
- School of Humanities
- School of Marxism
- School of Chinese Studies
- Department of Physical Education
- School of International Education (National center for international promotion of CM)
- Continuing Education College (Elderly University of CM)
- Medical Practice Education Center (simulated hospital)

It also runs a library, a museum, and an on-campus hospital.

== Affiliated institutions ==
BUCM runs a number of TCM research organizations. It hosts five TCM-related journals, one of which is in English (Journal of Traditional Chinese Medical Sciences, published by Elsevier).

BUCM has an affiliated clinic and eight affiliated hospitals. Five of these hospitals are used as teaching hospitals.

The BUCM also sold TCM preparations. In 2010, this formerly state-owned enterprise was converted into a limited liability company owned by two stockholders: Yabao Pharmaceutical Group and a Beizhong Asset Management Co owned by the university.

== Rankings and reputation ==
University rankings

Global – Overall
- QS World: 801-1000 (2023)
- USNWR Global: 1489 (2023)

Regional – Overall
- QS Asia: 351-400 (2023)
- USNWR Asia: 494 (2023)

National – Overall
- USNWR National: 192 (2023)

=== Academic Ranking of World Universities (ARWU) ===
Academic Ranking of World Universities (ARWU), also known as the Shanghai Ranking, is one of the annual publications of world university rankings. It's the first global university ranking with multifarious indicators.

Year	Rank	Valuer
2023	8	ARWU Best Chinese Universities Ranking - Ranking of Chinese Medical Universities

=== Quacquarelli Symonds (QS) ===
Year	Rank	Valuer
2023	351-400	QS Asian University Rankings
2023	801-1000	QS World University Rankings

=== U.S. News & World Report (2023) Best Global Universities Ranking ===
Year	Rank	Valuer
2022	1489	U.S. News Best Global Universities Ranking

== Gallery ==
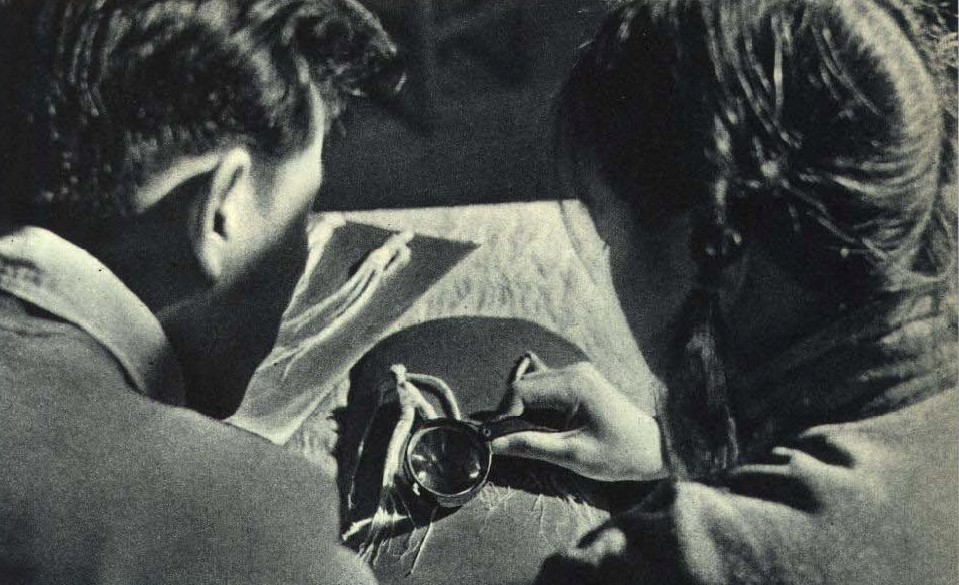
Student of BCCM learns to differentiate Asian ginseng from other herbs. March 1963, People's Pictorial.

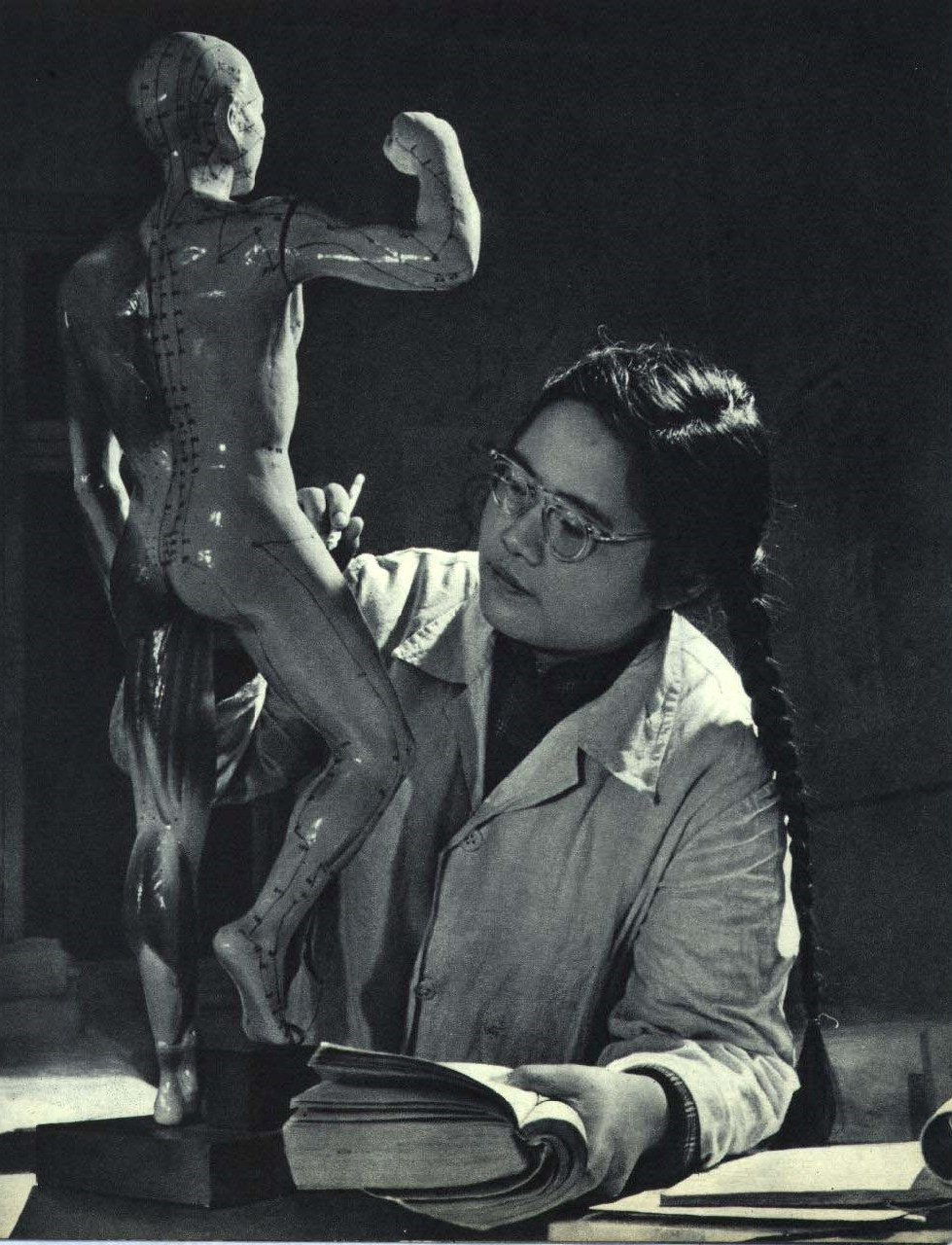
Student of BCCM learns acupuncture points. March 1963, People's Pictorial.

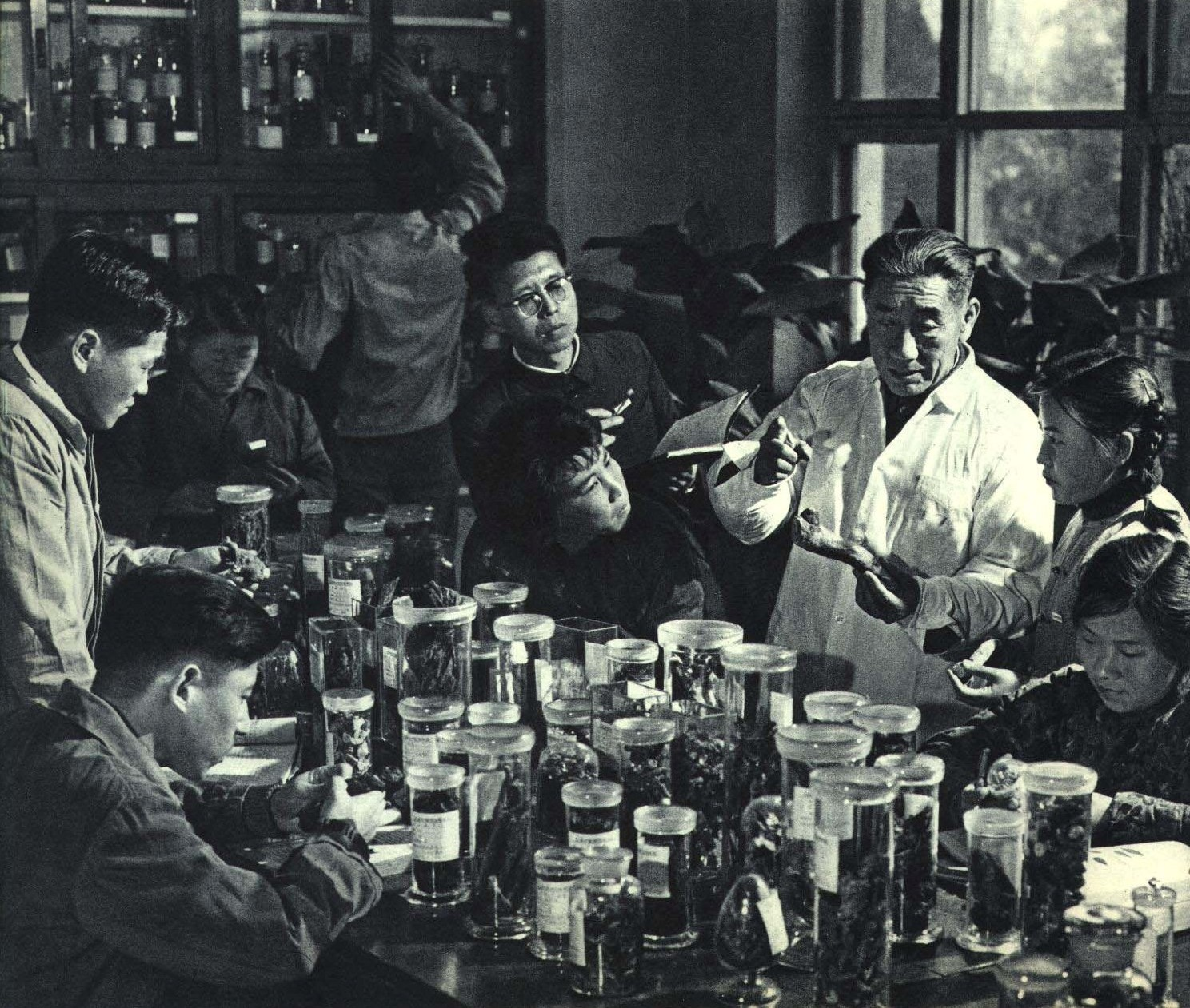
Materia Medica department at BCCM. March 1963, People's Pictorial.

== See also ==
- Beijing Hospital of Traditional Chinese Medicine
- Shanghai University of Chinese Medicine
