= Capital Medical University =

Municipal public university in Beijing, China

- 首都医科大学
- Former names: Beijing Second Medical College
- Motto: 扶伤济世、敬德修业
- Type: Public
- Established: 1960; 66 years ago
- Affiliations: BHUA
- Chairman: Hu Wen Liang
- President: Rao Yi
- Academic staff: 11,924 (March 2023)
- Students: 15,187 (March 2023)
- Undergraduates: 6,945 (March 2023)
- Postgraduates: 6,699 (March 2023)
- Location: Beijing, China; 39.8647046°N 116.353359°E
- Campus: Urban
- Website: ccmu.edu.cn

Chinese name
- Simplified Chinese: 首都医科大学
- Traditional Chinese: 首都醫科大學
Transcriptions
Standard Mandarin
- Hanyu Pinyin: Shǒudū Yīkē Dàxué

Capital Medical University (CCMU; 首都医科大学) is a municipal public university in Beijing, China. It is affiliated with the City of Beijing, and co-funded by the Beijing Municipal People's Government, the National Health Commission, and the Ministry of Education.

The university was founded in 1960 as the Beijing Second Medical College.

== Academics ==
=== Rankings and reputation ===
University rankings

Global – Overall
- ARWU World: 201-300 (2023)
- CWUR World: 358 (2023)
- CWTS World: 68 (2023)
- THE World: 601 (2023)
- USNWR Global: 884 (2022)

Regional – Overall
- CWTS Asia: 34 (2023)
- THE Asia: 99 (2022)
- USNWR Asia: 232 (2022)

National – Overall
- USNWR National: 93 (2022)

Capital Medical University is listed as one of the top 300 universities in the World University Rankings. CMU is consistently ranked among the top medical schools in China and has ranked in the top 1 or 2 best nationwide, together with Peking Union Medical College among Chinese Medical Universities in the recognized Best Chinese Universities Ranking.

As of 2025, its "Pharmacy & Pharmaceutical Sciences", "Dentistry & Oral Sciences", "Medical Technology", "Biomedical Engineering", "Nursing", "Human Biological Sciences", "Public Health", and "Clinical Medicine" were placed in the top 200 in the world by the Academic Ranking of World Universities. Its "Clinical Medicine" also ranked 135th globally by the U.S. News & World Report.

==== Academic Ranking of World Universities (ARWU) ====
Academic Ranking of World Universities (ARWU), also known as the Shanghai Ranking, is one of the annual publications of world university rankings. It's the first global university ranking with multifarious indicators.

Year	Rank	Valuer
2023	2	ARWU Best Chinese Universities Ranking - Ranking of Chinese Medical Universities
2024	2	ARWU Best Chinese Universities Ranking - Ranking of Chinese Medical Universities

==== Nature Index ====
Nature Index tracks the affiliations of high-quality scientific articles and presents research outputs by institution and country on monthly basis.

Year	Rank	Valuer
2021	73	Nature Index 2021 Young Universities (Leading 150 Young Universities)
2022	120	Nature Index - Academic Institutions - China
2023	100	Nature Index - Academic Institutions - China

==== Times Higher Education (THE) ====
Year	Rank	Valuer
2021	37	Times Higher Education Top Universities With Best Student-To-Staff Ratio
2022	36	Times Higher Education Top Universities With Best Student-To-Staff Ratio
2022	99	Times Higher Education Asia University Rankings
2023	601-800	Times Higher Education World University Rankings
2023	35	Times Higher Education Top Universities With Best Student-To-Staff Ratio

==== U.S. News & World Report Best Global Universities Ranking ====
Year	Rank	Valuer
2025	203	U.S. News Best Global Universities Ranking

==== CUAA (Chinese Universities Alumni Association) ====
Universities Ranking of China released by CUAA (Chinese Universities Alumni Association, Chinese: 中国校友会网) is one of the most foremost domestic university rankings in China.

Year	Rank	Valuer
2022	65	CUAA China University Ranking
2023	69	CUAA China University Ranking
