= Yu Wenming =

Chinese politician (born 1963)

- 于文明

Director of the National Administration of Traditional Chinese Medicine
- In office 28 June 2018 – 23 July 2023
- Preceded by: Wang Guoqiang
- Succeeded by: Yu Yanhong

Vice Chairperson of the Chinese Peasants' and Workers' Democratic Party Central Committee
- In office 1 December 2017 – 8 December 2022

Personal details
- Born: June 1963 (age 63) Shan County, Shandong, China
- Party: Chinese Peasants' and Workers' Democratic Party
- Education: Shandong University of Traditional Chinese Medicine; Tianjin University of Traditional Chinese Medicine

Yu Wenming (Chinese: 于文明; born June 1963) is a former Chinese politician, who served as the director of the National Administration of Traditional Chinese Medicine and the vice chairperson of the Chinese Peasants' and Workers' Democratic Party Central Committee.

He was a member of the 10th and 11th Chinese People's Political Consultative Conference, and a standing member of the 12th and 13th CPPCC.

== Early life and education ==
Yu was born in Shan County, Shandong in June 1963. He was gradurated from Shandong University of Traditional Chinese Medicine in 1985, where he majored in traditional Chinese medicine. Later he received master's degree in basic theories of traditional Chinese medicine by Tianjin University of Traditional Chinese Medicine.

== Career ==
After graduation, Yu was enrolled at China TCM News, where he served as journalist, editor, and deputy director of the department of traditional Chinese medicine and communications. From 1997 to 2004, he served as director of the China Traditional Chinese Medicine Science and Technology Development and Exchange Center.

In April 2004, he was appointed as deputy director of the National Administration of Traditional Chinese Medicine. In June 2018, he was promoted to director until July 2023.

He also served as the standing member and vice chairperson of the Chinese Peasants' and Workers' Democratic Party Central Committee.

== Investigation ==
On 22 June 2025, Yu was put under investigation for alleged "serious violations of laws" by the National Supervisory Commission, the highest anti-corruption agency of China. On 16 December, he was dismissed from public office.

On 21 August 2026, Yu was sentenced to 15 years and fine 6 million yuan for taking bribes in 63.44 million yuan in Tianjin No.1 Intermediate People's Court.
