= Yu Yanhong (politician) =

Chinese politician (born 1962)

- 余艳红

Director of the National Administration of Traditional Chinese Medicine
- In office 23 July 2023 – 27 February 2026
- Preceded by: Yu Wenming
- Succeeded by: Liu Jinfeng

Deputy Director of the National Administration of Traditional Chinese Medicine
- In office 28 June 2018 – 23 July 2023

Vice Governor of Guangdong
- In office 31 January 2018 – 26 July 2018
- Governor: Ma Xingrui

Personal details
- Born: October 1962 (age 64) Shaoyang, Hunan, China
- Party: Chinese Communist Party (1993-)
- Education: Hengyang Medical College; Hunan Medical University; Southern Medical University

Yu Yanhong (Chinese: 余艳红; born October 1962) is a Chinese female physician and politician, who was served as the director and deputy director of the National Administration of Traditional Chinese Medicine and the vice governor of Guangdong. She also served as the vice president of the All-China Women's Federation. She was a delegate to the 19th National Congress of the Chinese Communist Party.

== Career ==
Yu was born in Shaoyang, Hunan in October 1962. In 1978, she was enrolled to Hengyang Medical College (now a part of University of South China). After graduation in 1983, she was served as an obstetrician-gynecologist of the Second Affiliated Hospital of the Hengyang Medical College. In 1985, she was enrolled to Hunan Medical University (now Xiangya School of Medicine of Central South University) until 1988.

In 1988, Yu was enrolled to the Nanfang Hospital of the First Military Medical University and served as an obstetrician-gynecologist. In June 2005, she was appointed as the vice president of the hospital, and appointed as the president of the Southern Medical University in April 2013.

In January 2018, Yu was appointed as the vice governor of Guangdong. She was appointed as the deputy director of the National Administration of Traditional Chinese Medicine in June 2018. In November 2018, she was appointed as the vice prsident of the All-China Women's Federation.

In 2023, Yu was appointed as the director of the National Administration of Traditional Chinese Medicine, until 2026.

== Investigation ==
On 6 November 2026, Yu was suspected of "serious violations of laws and regulations" by the Central Commission for Discipline Inspection (CCDI), the party's internal disciplinary body, and the National Supervisory Commission, the highest anti-corruption agency of China.

Government offices
Preceded by Yu Wenming	Director of the National Administration of Traditional Chinese Medicine; 2023－2026	Succeeded by Liu Jinfeng
