= Zhujiang Hospital =

Zhujiang Hospital (Chinese: 珠江医院)
- Zhujiang Hospital of Southern Medical University

Geography
- Location: No. 253, Industrial Avenue Middle, Haizhu District, Guangzhou City, Guangdong Province, People's Republic of China

Organisation
- Care system: Public
- Type: Teaching, 3A
- Affiliated university: Southern Medical University

Services
- Emergency department: Yes
- Beds: 2,000+

History
- Founded: 1947

Links
- Website: www.zjyy.com.cn/enIndex

Zhujiang Hospital, literally "Pearl River Hospital", full name "Zhujiang Hospital of Southern Medical University", is the Second Affiliated Hospital and the Second Clinical Medical College of Southern Medical University, located at Guangzhou City, Guangdong Province of China. Founded in 1947, Zhujiang Hospital is now a large comprehensive Grade A tertiary hospital integrating medical treatment, education and research.

== Historical development ==
The predecessor of Zhujiang Hospital of Southern Medical University was a field hospital established during the Second Chinese Civil War. In February 1947, the Tenth Rear Hospital of the Chinese People's Liberation Army was officially established in Jiangyu Town, Yimeng Mountain Area, Shandong Province of China.

In the following years, the hospital followed the war situation and moved to Shandong, Hebei, Jiangsu, Anhui, Jiangxi and Fujian, participating in the front-line medical care work of major battles in the Central and Eastern China battlefields of the Chinese Civil War, and treating more than 34,000 wounded and sick soldiers. During this period, the hospital changed its name several times due to changes in its mission, successively becoming the "Third Rear Hospital of the Chinese People's Liberation Army" (October 1947), the "First Temporary Hospital of Jinan City of the Chinese People's Liberation Army" (December 1948), the "Fifth Field Hospital of the Chinese People's Liberation Army" (April 1950), and the "First Field Hospital of the Chinese People's Liberation Army" (October 1952).

In January 1955, the hospital was renamed the "103rd Hospital of the Chinese People's Liberation Army". In June of the same year, the hospital completed its reorganization and moved to Yong'an City, Fujian Province, officially ending its field hospital mission and taking on the function of a garrison hospital. During its 23 years of service in Fujian and subsequent relocation (until May 1978), the hospital provided medical services to more than 160,000 local military and civilian personnel and trained more than 4,000 medical personnel at the grassroots level.

On May 1, 1978, with the approval of the General Staff Department and the General Logistics Department of the Chinese People's Liberation Army, the 103rd Hospital was officially transferred to the First Military Medical University of the Chinese People's Liberation Army as a teaching hospital and moved to Guangzhou, Guangdong Province. It was internally known as the "Second Affiliated Hospital of the First Military Medical University of the Chinese People's Liberation Army", and externally as "Zhujiang Hospital".

In October 1981, the hospital moved to its current location in Haizhu District, Guangzhou City, and officially opened to the public in January 1983.

In 1985, the Yiqiao Medical Service Center was founded, which was one of China's earliest medical departments providing services for Hong Kong, Macao, Taiwan and oversea patients.

In 1994, the hospital was rated as one of the first batch of Grade A tertiary hospitals in China.

In August of 2004, in accordance with the orders of the State Council and the Central Military Commission, the hospital was transferred to the management of Guangdong Province along with the First Military Medical University, separated from the military system. The university was renamed "Southern Medical University" and the hospital the "Second Clinical Medical College of Southern Medical University" (externally "Zhujiang Hospital").

On July 11, 2020, the pediatric building of Zhujiang Hospital was opened, further enhancing the medical treatment capacity to 19 specialties and 352 beds)".

In June 2025, South China's first brain-computer interface clinical research ward was founded in Zhujiang Hospital.

== Hospitals Under Management ==
In addition to the campuses in Guangzhou, Zhujiang Hospital manages six reginal hospitals, including

- Southern Medical University Zhujiang Hospital Sanshui Branch (Sanshui District People's Hospital, Foshan City)
- Southern Medical University Zhujiang Hospital Guangning Branch (Guangning County People's Hospital, Zhaoqing City)
- Southern Medical University Zhujiang Hospital Luoding Branch (Luoding City People's Hospital, Yunfu City)
- Southern Medical University Zhujiang Hospital Chaonan Branch (Chaonan District People's Hospital, Shangtou City)
- Southern Medical University Zhujiang Hospital Enping Branch (Enping City Healthcare Consortium General Hospital, Jiangmen City)
- Southern Medical University Zhujiang Hospital Longmen Branch (Longmen County General Hospital, Huizhou City).

== Other information ==
Zhujiang Hospital is a large comprehensive hospital integrating medical treatment, education, research and preventive healthcare. It covers a land area of about 50,000 square meters, with 170,000 square meters of construction area. There are 3,900 employees, 2,300 beds and 23 key clinical specialties. And there is a national Chinese-Western medicine integrated "flagship" department. The hospital serves over three million outpatient visits annually.

In scientific research, the hospital published 71 papers listed in Nature Index for the time frame of 1 June 2025 - 30 May 2026, ranking 124th globally and 51th in China.

In the 2024 China Hospital and Specialty Reputation Ranking, Zhujiang Hospital ranked A+ (top-80) in the comprehensive hospital ranking, and 9th in Rehabilitation nationally.

The hospital is located at: No. 253, Gongye Middle Ave, Haizhu District, Guangzhou, China.

== See also ==
- Southern Medical University
- Nanfang Hospital
- List of hospitals in China
