= Shi Xuemin =

Traditional Chinese medicine practitioner (1938–2025)

- 石学敏
- Born: 6 June 1938; Tianjin, China
- Died: 11 May 2025 (aged 86); Tianjin, China
- Education: Tianjin University of Traditional Chinese Medicine
- Scientific career
- Fields: Science of acupuncture and moxibustion
- Workplaces: Tianjin University of Traditional Chinese Medicine

Chinese name
- Simplified Chinese: 石学敏
- Traditional Chinese: 石學敏
Transcriptions
Standard Mandarin
- Hanyu Pinyin: Shí Xuémǐn

Shi Xuemin (Chinese: 石学敏; 6 June 1938 – 11 May 2025) was a Chinese traditional medicine practitioner who was a professor at Tianjin University of Traditional Chinese Medicine, a onetime president of the First Affiliated Hospital of Tianjin University of Traditional Chinese Medicine, and an academician of the Chinese Academy of Engineering.

== Life and career ==
Shi was born in Tianjin on 6 June 1938. He attended the Tianlü Normal University Affiliated Boys' High School. In 1957, he enrolled at Tianjin College of Traditional Chinese Medicine (now Tianjin University of Traditional Chinese Medicine).

After graduation in 1962, Shi became a traditional Chinese medicine practitioner at the First Affiliated Hospital of Tianjin College of Traditional Chinese Medicine, where he eventually became president in 1983. He also taught at Tianjin University of Traditional Chinese Medicine, where he was promoted to associate professor in 1983 and to full professor in 1991.

On 11 May 2025, Shi died in Tianjin at the age of 86.

== Honours and awards ==
- 1999 Member of the Chinese Academy of Engineering (CAE)
- 2020 Member of the China Academy of Chinese Medical Sciences
