= Tong Xiaolin =

Chinese physician

- 仝小林
- Born: January 5, 1956 (age 70); Jilin City, Jilin, China
- Education: Changchun University of Chinese Medicine; Wannan Medical College; Nanjing University of Chinese Medicine
- Scientific career
- Fields: Traditional Chinese internal medicine
- Workplaces: State Administration of Traditional Chinese Medicine; China Academy of Chinese Medical Sciences

Tong Xiaolin (Chinese: 仝小林; pinyin: Tóng Xiǎolín; born 5 January 1956) is a traditional Chinese physician, academician of the Chinese Academy of Sciences (CAS), and professor at Peking University and Beijing University of Chinese Medicine.

== Biography ==
Tong was born in Jilin City, Jilin on January 5, 1956. After the resumption of college entrance examination, he graduated from Changchun University of Chinese Medicine in 1982. He received his master's degree from Wannan Medical College in 1985 and doctor's degree from Nanjing University of Chinese Medicine in 1988, respectively.

== Honours and awards ==
- 2009 State Science and Technology Progress Award (Second Class)
- 2011 State Science and Technology Progress Award (Second Class)
- November 22, 2019 Member of the Chinese Academy of Sciences (CAS)
