= Xiyuan Hospital =

Xiyuan Hospital (Chinese: 西苑医院)
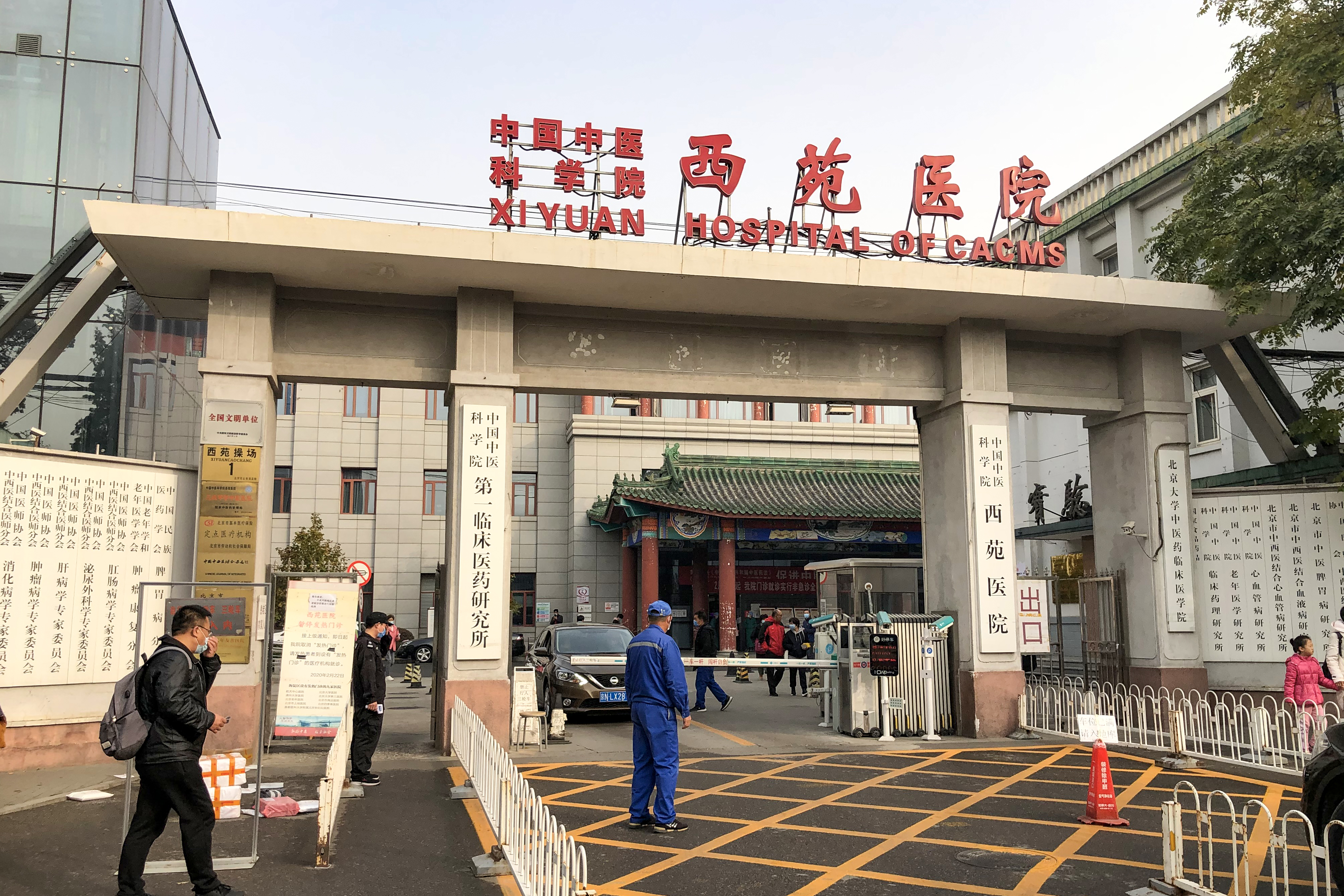
- Xiyuan Hospital Main Entrance

Geography
- Location: No. 1 Xiyuan Playground, Haidian District, Beijing, China

Organisation
- Affiliated university: China Academy of Chinese Medical Sciences

Services
- Standards: Grade A tertiary hospital

History
- Founded: December 19, 1955; 70 years ago

Links
- Website: www.xyhospital.com/Html/News/Main/880.html

Xiyuan Hospital, full name "Xiyuan Hospital of the China Academy of Chinese Medical Sciences", is a Traditional Chinese Medicine hospital directly affiliated with the China Academy of Chinese Medical Sciences (CACMS). Founded in December 1955, Xiyuan Hospital has developed into a large-scale Grade A tertiary hospital integrating medical treatment, scientific research, teaching, and health care. The hospital is located in Beijing, People's Republic of China.

== Historical development ==
On December 19, 1955, the "Academy of Chinese Medical Sciences", together with its Affiliated Hospital, was founded at No. 1 Xiyuan Playground, Haidian District of Beijing. Occupying a two-story building, the Xiyuan hospital was the first large Chinese medicine hospital built by the Central Government of the People's Republic of China.

In 1963, the hospital was officially renamed "Xiyuan Hospital of the Academy of Chinese Medical Sciences".

In 1985, the hospital was renamed "Xiyuan Hospital of the China Academy of Chinese Medical Sciences".

In November 1991, Chen Keji of Xiyuan Hospital was elected as an academician of the Chinese Academy of Sciences, becoming the first academician in the field of Traditional Chinese Medicine.

In 2003, Xiyuan Hospital became the first hospital nadewide to win the first prize of National Science and Technology Progress Award in the field of Traditional Chinese Medicine.

In 2005, the hospital was renamed "Xiyuan Hospital of the China Academy of Traditional Chinese Medicine".

On December 15, 2008, the renovation and expansion project of Xiyuan Hospital commenced, initially constructing a comprehensive medical building, followed by the construction of an outpatient building and a medical technology building. The comprehensive medical building was put into use as an outpatient and emergency turnover building on August 14, 2010.

In 2013, the new outpatient building was completed and put into use.

In 2019, Xiyuan Hospital was approved as the "National Clinical Research Center for Cardiovascular Diseases in Traditional Chinese Medicine".

In 2020, Xiyuan Hospital was selected by the State Council into the List of Advanced Collectives in the National Fight Against COVID-19.

In 2023, the Jining branch of Xiyuan Hospital was officially established in Jining City of Shandong Province.

In 2025, the Suzhou branch of Xiyuan Hospital, China Academy of Chinese Medical Sciences, officially opened in Suzhou City of Jiangsu Province.

== Present-day ==
Xiyuan Hospital is now a large Grade A tertiary hospital of Traditional Chinese Medicine, integrating medical treatment, scientific research, teaching, and healthcare. There are 36 clinical departments, 800 beds, and 20 ward areas.

The hospital has 1,500 employees, including one academician of Chinese Academy of Science and one academician of Chinese Academy of Engineering.

The hospital published 21 papers listed in Nature Index for the Time frame of 1 January 2025 - 31 December 2025, ranking 761st globally and 275th in China. The hospital also publishes the Chinese Journal of Integrative Medicine (SCI indexed) and Integrative Medicine in Nephrology and Andrology (IMNA).

Xiyuan Hospital is also the "National Clinical Research Base for Traditional Chinese Medicine" and the national engineering laboratory for evaluating the clinical efficacy and safety of traditional Chinese medicine.

The hospital meanwhile serves as a clinical teaching base for Peking University Health Science Center and Beijing University of Chinese Medicine. It is also an international teaching base for acupuncture and traditional Chinese medicine degree education.

The hospital is a site of WHO Collaborating Centers for Traditional Medicine, and responsible for issuing relevant standards. And there is cooperation with medical institutions in the United States, Germany, Australia and other countries.

Hospital Address: No.1, Xiyuan Playground, Haidian District, Beijing, China.

== See also ==
- China Academy of Chinese Medical Sciences
- State Administration of Traditional Chinese Medicine
