= Zhang Boli (physician) =

Chinese physician

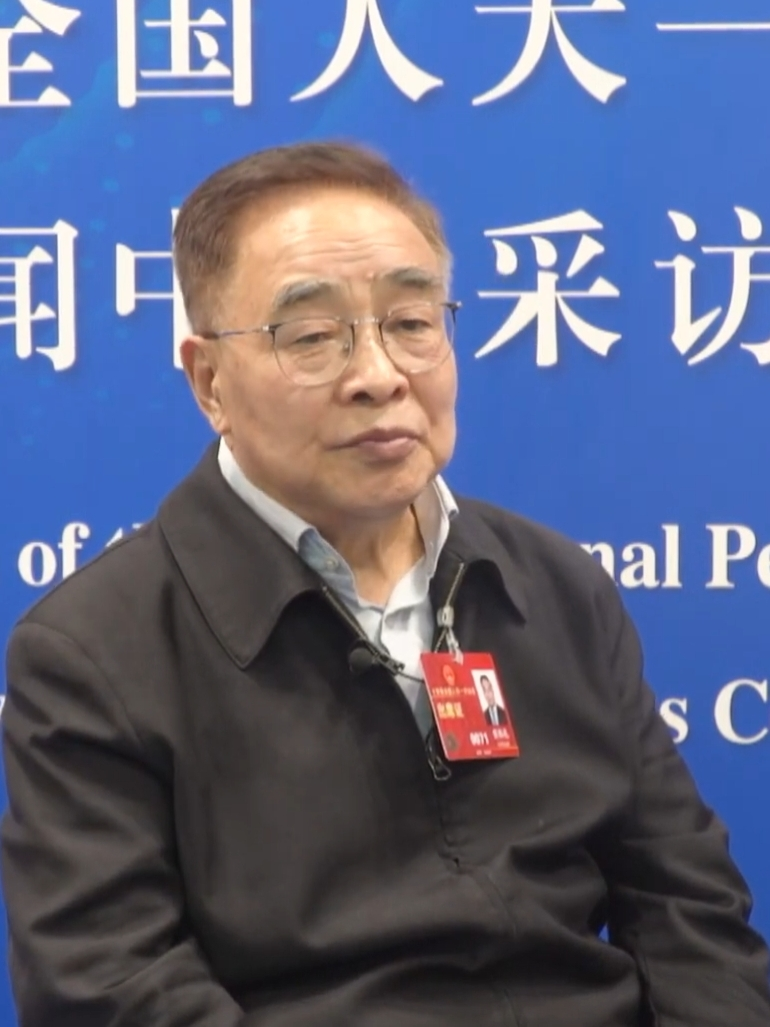
- Born: 26 February 1948 (age 78); Tianjin, China
- Education: Tianjin University of Traditional Chinese Medicine
- Children: 1
- Awards: "People's Hero" national honorary title (2020)
- Scientific career
- Fields: Traditional Chinese medicine
- Workplaces: Tianjin University of Traditional Chinese Medicine

Chinese name
- Traditional Chinese: 張伯禮
- Simplified Chinese: 张伯礼
Transcriptions
Standard Mandarin
- Hanyu Pinyin: Zhāng Bólǐ

Zhang Boli (Chinese: 张伯礼; pinyin: Zhāng Bólǐ; born 26 February 1948) is a Chinese physician, medical researcher and educator in the field of traditional Chinese medicine (TCM). He is an academician of the Chinese Academy of Engineering, an honorary president of the China Academy of Chinese Medical Sciences, honorary president of Tianjin University of Traditional Chinese Medicine, and director of the State Key Laboratory of Component-based Chinese Medicine.

Zhang has long worked on the prevention and treatment of cardiovascular and cerebrovascular diseases and on the modernization of traditional Chinese medicine. He is also known in China for his role in public health emergencies, including the 2003 SARS outbreak and the COVID-19 pandemic in Wuhan in 2020. In 2020, he was awarded the national honorary title "People's Hero" for his contribution to China's COVID-19 response.

Zhang Boli has long been engaged in research on the prevention and treatment of cardiovascular and cerebrovascular diseases as well as the modernization of traditional Chinese medicine. He presided over the formulation of the "China Undergraduate Education Standards for Traditional Chinese Medicine", carried out the standardization construction of traditional Chinese medicine and the accreditation work of the Traditional Chinese Medicine major. The "World Undergraduate Education Standards for Traditional Chinese Medicine (Before Traditional Chinese Medicine Practitioners)" formulated under his leadership has been promoted and applied in over 50 countries and regions around the world. Establish a "Belt and Road" training base for traditional Chinese medicine teachers and formulate world-class professional certification standards for traditional Chinese medicine.

== Early life and education ==
Zhang was born in Tianjin, China, on 26 February 1948, with ancestral roots in Ningjin County, Hebei Province. In 1964, he entered Tianjin Health School. After graduation in 1968, he worked as a doctor at a rural health institution in the Dagang area of Tianjin, where he became interested in traditional Chinese medicine.

In the 1970s, Zhang attended a program in which practitioners trained in Western medicine studied traditional Chinese medicine. In 1979, after the restoration of graduate entrance examinations in China, he enrolled in the graduate program of Tianjin College of Traditional Chinese Medicine. He received a master's degree in Chinese internal medicine in 1982 and subsequently stayed at the college to engage in clinical work, teaching and research.

== Career ==
After receiving his master's degree, Zhang began his academic and clinical career at Tianjin College of Traditional Chinese Medicine. In 1992, he became director of the Institute of Chinese Medicine Engineering at the college. In 1999, he was appointed vice president of the First Affiliated Hospital of Tianjin College of Traditional Chinese Medicine, and in 2002 he became president of the college. In 2005, Zhang was elected as a member of the Chinese Academy of Engineering. In 2006, after the college was renamed Tianjin University of Traditional Chinese Medicine, he continued to serve as its president. In 2010, he became president of the China Academy of Chinese Medical Sciences, a national-level institution for TCM research.He later served as honorary president of the academy and honorary president of Tianjin University of Traditional Chinese Medicine.

Zhang has also held a number of academic and policy positions, including roles related to medical education, Chinese medicine standardization, national new-drug development and academic organizations in Chinese medicine and integrative medicine.

== Research and academic contributions ==
Zhang's research focuses on traditional Chinese internal medicine, especially cardiovascular and cerebrovascular diseases, vascular dementia, stroke, and the modernization of traditional Chinese medicine. Official institutional biographies credit him with combining traditional Chinese medical theory with modern scientific methods to study the material basis, mechanisms and clinical effects of Chinese herbal medicines.

One of Zhang's major research themes is "component-based Chinese medicine", a model that investigates the active components and compatibility rules of herbal formulas. His work has also been associated with the "secondary development" of established Chinese patent medicines, aiming to clarify their active ingredients, improve quality control and support industrial upgrading.

In 2007, Zhang was designated by the Ministry of Culture as a representative inheritor of Traditional Chinese Medicine Preparation Methods, a project included in the first batch of China's National Intangible Cultural Heritage list.

Zhang has led or participated in major national research programs, including projects related to the key scientific problems of Chinese herbal formulas, evidence-based evaluation of TCM, and the clinical study of Chinese medicines for cardiovascular diseases. His research and development work on the secondary development of Chinese patent medicines won the First Prize of the State Scientific and Technological Progress Award in 2014.

== Public health work ==
=== SARS outbreak ===
During the 2003 SARS outbreak, Zhang organized a traditional Chinese medicine medical team in Tianjin and promoted the use of integrated Chinese and Western medical approaches in treatment. Related clinical research on integrated Chinese and Western medicine for SARS later received the Second Prize of the State Scientific and Technological Progress Award.

=== COVID-19 pandemic ===
In January 2020, during the early stage of the COVID-19 outbreak in China, Zhang travelled to Wuhan as part of the national response. According to Xinhua and the National Health Commission of China, he arrived in Wuhan on 27 January 2020 and helped organize a TCM medical team that worked in Jiangxia Fangcang Hospital, a makeshift hospital in Wuhan's Jiangxia District.

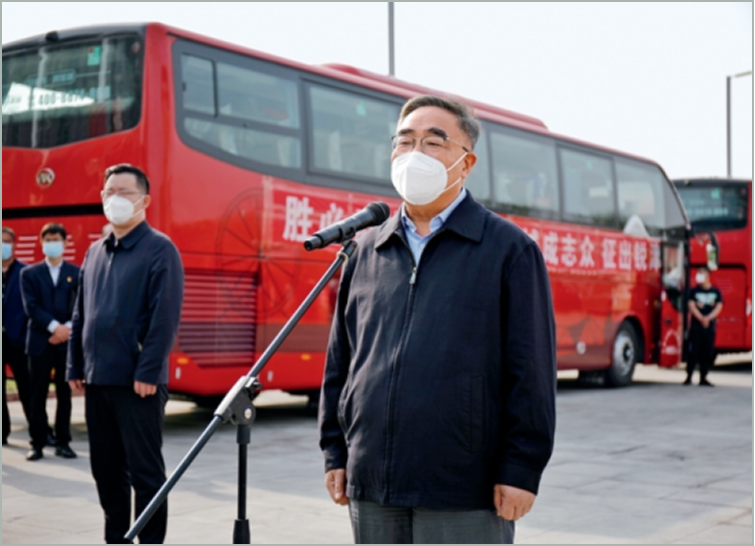
Dr. Zhang Boli led the medical team to Wuhan during Covid pandemic in 2020

At Jiangxia Fangcang Hospital, Zhang and other medical workers used an integrated approach that included Chinese herbal medicines, acupuncture, massage, tai chi, Baduanjin exercise and other supportive measures in addition to isolation and medical monitoring. The National Health Commission's English-language account reported that none of the 564 patients with mild symptoms at the TCM-oriented temporary hospital developed severe disease, according to Zhang's statement.

Zhang also advocated early TCM intervention for quarantined and mild COVID-19 patients. Official Chinese accounts describe his work as part of the broader integration of Chinese and Western medicine in China's COVID-19 treatment strategy. In 2020, he was awarded the national honorary title "People's Hero".

In 2022, Zhang served as head of the traditional Chinese medicine expert group within the State Council's COVID-19 prevention and control working group deployed to Shanghai during the Omicron outbreak.

== Education and talent cultivation ==
Zhang has been active in the reform of TCM education in China. He has advocated an educational model emphasizing knowledge, clinical competence and professional ethics. He also promoted case-based teaching, clinical thinking training and the combination of institutional education with traditional master-apprentice learning.

He helped formulate undergraduate education standards for Chinese medicine in China and took part in the development of international education standards for undergraduate TCM education. According to Baidu Baike and institutional sources, the international standard for TCM undergraduate education has been promoted in more than 50 countries and regions.

Zhang also established the "Yongbo" scholarship or incentive fund at Tianjin University of Traditional Chinese Medicine, using personal award money to support students with strong academic performance and financial need.

== Policy and social service ==
Zhang has served multiple terms as a deputy to the National People's Congress. According to Tianjin University of Traditional Chinese Medicine, he has submitted more than 150 motions and proposals related to TCM legislation, technological innovation, industrial development and talent training.

He was involved in advocacy for legislation on traditional Chinese medicine. Zhang repeatedly submitted proposals related to TCM law and participated in discussions on the development and implementation of the Law of the People's Republic of China on Traditional Chinese Medicine, which was adopted in 2016.

In more recent policy proposals, Zhang has focused on the digital transformation of the TCM industry, artificial intelligence in TCM research and manufacturing, elderly healthcare services, rehabilitation, and the protection and substitution of endangered medicinal materials.

== Honours and awards ==
2005: Elected as a member of the Chinese Academy of Engineering.

2011: Second Prize of the State Scientific and Technological Progress Award for clinical research related to Qishen Yiqi dripping pills and secondary prevention of myocardial infarction.

2014: First Prize of the State Scientific and Technological Progress Award for the secondary development of Chinese patent medicines.

2020: Awarded the national honorary title "People's Hero" for his contribution to the COVID-19 response.

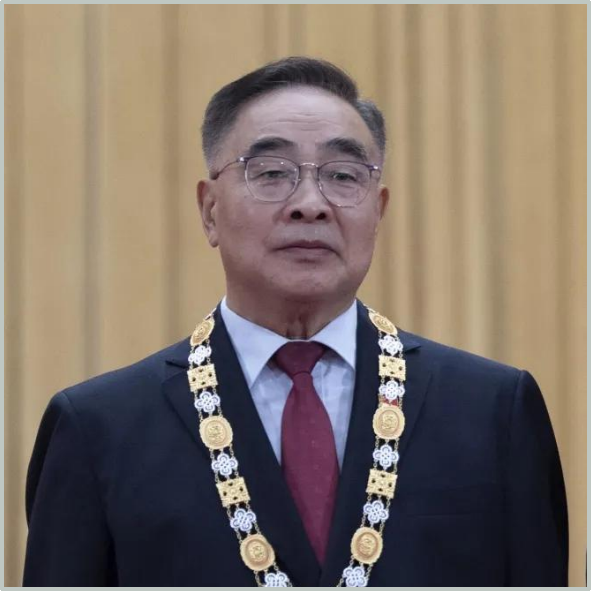
Dr. Zhang Boli was awarded the honorary title "People's Hero"

2022: Named a National Master of Traditional Chinese Medicine.

2024: Second Prize of the State Scientific and Technological Progress Award for the creation and application of a diagnosis and treatment technology system for the prevention and treatment of COVID-19 with traditional Chinese medicine.

== Views on traditional Chinese medicine ==
Zhang has argued that traditional Chinese medicine should absorb modern technologies in order to explain its mechanisms, improve clinical evidence and modernize its production system. In public remarks, he has emphasized that artificial intelligence, evidence-based medicine, intelligent manufacturing and standardized quality control can be used to clarify the active ingredients and mechanisms of Chinese herbal formulas.

== Selected works ==
Zhang has edited or co-edited a number of academic books and textbooks on Chinese internal medicine, Chinese materia medica, Chinese medicine pharmacology and clinical applications of Chinese patent medicines. According to Baidu Baike, by October 2020 he had published more than 700 academic papers and edited more than 20 monographs.

== Incidents ==
- Deepfake advertising incident

In March 2025, Chinese media reported that artificial intelligence-generated videos and images depicting Zhang were being used without authorization to promote commercial skincare products.

According to reports, Zhang publicly stated that he had never endorsed, promoted, researched, or used the products being advertised. The incident attracted national attention as an example of the misuse of generative artificial intelligence technology and deepfake content in commercial advertising.

- Unauthorized use of name

In October 2025, Tianjin University of Traditional Chinese Medicine issued a public statement concerning organizations and social media accounts that were allegedly using Zhang's name and reputation without authorization. The statement indicated that Zhang had not invested in, founded, or authorized any institution to operate under his name and that legal measures would be pursued where necessary to protect his rights and reputation.

== See also ==
Traditional Chinese medicine Chinese Academy of Engineering China Academy of Chinese Medical Sciences Tianjin University of Traditional Chinese Medicine COVID-19 pandemic in mainland China 2002–2004 SARS outbreak
