= Longhua Hospital =

Hospital in Shanghai

Longhua Hospital (simplified Chinese: 龙华医院; traditional Chinese: 龍華醫院; pinyin: Lónghuá Yīyuàn), full name "Longhua Hospital affiliated to Shanghai University of Chinese Medicine", is a Grade A tertiary hospital in Shanghai, China. Founded in July 1960 as one of the four earliest clinical bases for Traditional Chinese Medicine (TCM) in the People's Republic of China, Longhua is now a national model hospital well known for its TCM treatment, research and education.

== History ==
In 1960, Longhua Hospital was founded in Shanghai as an affiliated hospital of Shanghai University of Chinese Medicine, and as one of the earliest clinical institutions of traditional Chinese medicine (TCM) in China.

In 2001, the hospital opened the world's first Research Office for the Inheritance of Famous Veteran Traditional Chinese Medicine Practitioners.

In 2003, the Shanghai No. 3 Steel Plant Staff Hospital merged in, becoming the Pudong Branch of Longhua Hospital.

In 2008, Longhua Hospital was designated as a national clinical research base for traditional Chinese medicine by the State Administration of Traditional Chinese Medicine, responsible for research on malignant tumors and degenerative bone diseases.

In 2012, Longhua Hospital ranked first place among all Grade A tertiary TCM hospitals of China.

In 2017, the hospital was designated as a national clinical research base for traditional Chinese medicine by the State Administration of Traditional Chinese Medicine.

In June 2018, Longhua Hospital became the world's first TCM hospital to win the honor of Academic Medical Center accredited by the Joint Commission International.

In 2020, the hospital became one of the first batch of key professional bases for standardized residency training (Traditional Chinese Medicine).

In 2024, the Gansu branch of Longhua Hospital was opened at the Affiliated Hospital of Gansu University of Traditional Chinese Medicine in Gansu Province.

In 2025, the hospital was selected as a national Standardization Research and Transformation Center for Traditional Chinese Medicine.

== Current situation ==
Longhua Hospital is now a national model hospital well known for its TCM treatment, research and education. It covers an area of 189.65 mu.

There are 1,750 inpatient beds, over 4.15 million annual outpatient visits and around 63,000 inpatient discharges.

The specialty departments open to foreign patients include: Acupuncture, Tuina, Rehabilitation, Dermatology, Nephrology, Anorectal Department, Oncology, Orthopedics and Traumatology, Gynecology, Rheumatology and Immunology.

As a clinical medical college, Longhua Hospital undertakes the teaching work for undergraduate and graduate students of Shanghai University of Chinese Medicine, and the graduation internship of the School of Chinese Medicine of the University of Hong Kong every year.

The hospital hosts and publishes Longhua Chinese Medicine, an international academic journal on Traditional Chinese Medicine. The hospital published 17 papers listed in Nature Index for the Time frame of 1 January 2025 - 31 December 2025, ranking 578th globally and 211th in China.

Address:

- Main campus: No 725, South Wanping road, Xuhui District, Shanghai, China.
- Pudong branch: No.45, Shangnan Road, Shanggang NO.2 community, Pudong District, Shanghai.

== See also ==
- Shanghai University of Chinese Medicine
