= Guang'anmen Hospital =

Coordinates: 39.88922°N 116.34574°E

Guang'anmen Hospital (Chinese: 广安门医院)
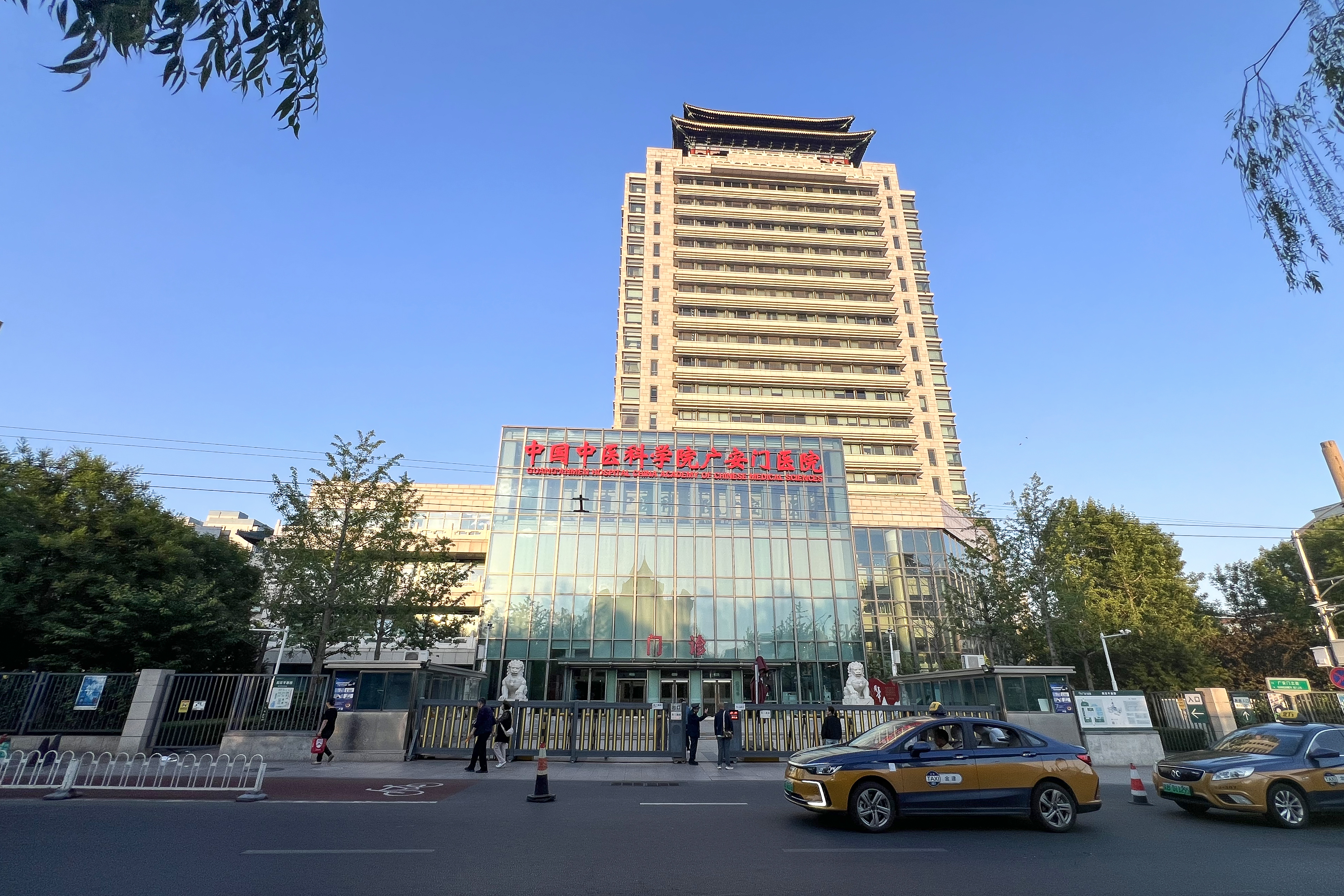

Geography
- Location: No.5, Beixiange, Xicheng District, Beijing

Organisation
- Affiliated university: China Academy of Chinese Medical Sciences

Services
- Standards: Grade A tertiary hospital

History
- Founded: 1955

Links
- Website: gamyy.cn

Guang'anmen Hospital, full name "Guang'anmen Hospital of China Academy of Chinese Medical Sciences", is a Grade A tertiary hospital of Traditional Chinese Medicine (TCM) in Beijing, China. It is also the Second Clinical Medical Research Institute of China Academy of Chinese Medical Sciences (CACMS) and a health care base for cadres of the Central Committee of the Chinese Communist Party. Founded in 1955, Guang'anmen Hospital is now a large hospital of over one thousand employees, integrating clinical care, research, and education.

== History ==
In 1955, a hospital affiliated to the Traditional Chinese Medicine Academy of the Ministry of Health was founded near the Guang'anmen of Beijing. A large number of well-known experts in traditional Chinese medicine and in integrated Chinese and Western medicine joined the hospital from all over the country.

In 1975, the International Training Department of the hospital was partially entrusted by the World Health Organization.

In 1980, the hospital became the "Second Institute of Clinical Medicine Affiliated to the TCM Academy".

In 1993, the hospital was rated a Grade A tertiary hospital.

In 2005, the hospital was officially renamed "Guang'anmen Hospital, China Academy of Chinese Medical Sciences".

In 2008, the hospital was a designated hospital for the Beijing Olympic Games and Paralympic Games.

In June 2009, the International Medical Department was established.

In 2011, the Daxing District Hospital of Traditional Chinese Medicine merged in and became the Guang'anmen Hospital Southern District.

In 2020, it became a role model in the country's fight against the COVID-19.

In 2023, Guang'anmen Hospital spearheaded the establishment of the International Medical Services Alliance in Chinese medicine.

In 2025, the hospital was selected as a national Standardization Research and Transformation Center for Traditional Chinese Medicine.

== Current situation ==
Guang'anmen Hospital is now a large comprhensive Grade A tertiary hospital with a floor area of 35,000 square meters and a construction area of 86,028 square meters. It is a national model TCM hospital and a health care base for central cadres of China, integrating clinical care, research, and education.

There are 1,245 employees, 26 clinical departments, and 649 beds, with 6 national key clinical specialties (Oncology, Cardiology, Rheumatology, Dermatology, Endocrinology, and Traditional Chinese Medicine Nursing).

Medical education majors on continuing education and postgraduate education. More than 40,000 practitioners from 86 countries hav been trained in the hospital.

The hospital published 5 papers listed in Nature Index for the Time frame of 1 January 2025 - 31 December 2025, ranking 1073rd globally and 366th in China.

The hospital has developed 120 hospital preparations, include Xihuang Jiedu Capsules for tumors, Yingtumiao Capsules for thyroid issues, Xiaochuan Ointment for cough and asthma, which are of remarkable therapeutic effects.

The hospital is the hosting institution of the Clinical Efficacy Evaluation Professional Committee of the World Federation of Chinese Medicine Societies, and of the WHO Collaborating Center on Traditional Medicine. It is a ISO9001 quality management certified organization and a vice chairman unit of the Chinese Nursing Association.

Address:

- Main Campus: No. 5, Beixiange, Guang'anmennei, Xicheng District, Beijing;
- South Campus: No. 138, Xingfeng Street (Section 2), Huangcun Town, Beijing.

== Controversy over scalpers reselling appointment slots ==
In January 2016, a video of a woman angrily confronting scalpers at Guang'anmen Hospital sparked heated online discussions. In the video, she accused the hospital administration of colluding with scalpers, and criticized the scalpers for inflating the registration fee from 300 yuan to 4,500 yuan. Afterwards, the police intervened in the investigation. The Beijing Municipal Health and Family Planning Commission responded that it had always adopted a "zero-tolerance" policy towards the phenomenon of "scalpers," especially the collusion between individual illegal personnel within and outside medical institutions. However, after the incident, according to an undercover investigation by Xinhua News Agency reporters, scalpers were still defying the law.

== See also ==
- China Academy of Chinese Medical Sciences
- State Administration of Traditional Chinese Medicine
- Guang'anmen
