= Shanghai University of Chinese Medicine =

Shanghai University of Chinese Medicine (Chinese: 上海中医药大学)
- Motto: Diligence, Benevolence, Truth, Innovation
- Type: public
- Established: 1956
- Affiliations: Shanghai Municipal People's Government (jointly established with the Ministry of Education of the People's Republic of China, the National Health Commission of the People's Republic of China, and the State Administration of Traditional Chinese Medicine)
- President: Ji Guang
- Students: about 11,000
- Location: Shanghai, People's Republic of China
- Campus: urban
- Website: www.shutcm.edu.cn

The Shanghai University of Chinese Medicine, officially "Shanghai University of Traditional Chinese Medicine", also called the "Shanghai Academy of Traditional Chinese Medicine", is a leading medical institution in Shanghai, China. With a history tracible to 1916, the school is one of the earliest four Chinese medical colleges in China. In 2026, Shanghai University of Chinese Medicine took 2nd place in the Shanghai Ranking of Chinese Medicine Universities.

== History ==
In 1917, the "Shanghai School of Chinese Medicine" was founded in Shanghai. Later, it was renamed "Shanghai Junior College of Chinese Medicine".

In 1956, after the founding of the People's Republic of China, the school was promoted to "Shanghai College of Chinese Medicine".

In 1975, the college held the first acupuncture class for foreign students.

In 1985, the Shanghai Academy of Traditional Chinese Medicine was established, and merged with the Shanghai University of Chinese Medicine.

In 1993 the school was renamed "Shanghai University of Chinese Medicine".

In 2003, the Shanghai Museum of Traditional Chinese Medicine was established.

In 2015, the university became one of the five founding members of the World First-Class Traditional Chinese Medicine Universities Construction Alliance.

In 2017, the university was listed into the Double First-Class Construction universities and disciplines.

In 2026, Shanghai University of Chinese Medicine took 2nd place in the Shanhai Ranking of Chinese Medicine Universities.

== Degree programs ==
The university offers programs for doctoral, master an bachelor degrees, including:

- Doctoral Programs in Traditional Chinese Medicine, Chinese Materia Medica, Integrative Medicine;
- Master Programs in History of Science and Technology, Medical technology;
- Bachelor Programs in Traditional Chinese Medicine (5-year), Acupuncture and Tuina, Clinical Integrative Medicine, Chinese Materia Medica, Pharmaceutical Science (China-UK Joint Program), Rehabilitation Therapy, Hearing and Speech Rehabilitation, Nursing, Bio-engineering (Focusing on TCM informatics and engineering), Food Safety and Nutrition, Public Administration (Focusing on Health Management), Preventive Medicine.

== Hospitals ==
Currently, there are 9 affiliated hospitals, including:

- Longhua Hospital
- Shuguang Hospital
- Yueyang Integrative Medicine Hospital
- Shanghai Municipal Hospital of Traditional Chinese Medicine
- Putuo Hospital
- Shanghai TCM-Integrated Hospital
- Shanghai Seventh People's Hospital
- Guanghua Integrated Traditional Chinese and Western Medicine Hospital
- Baoshan Hospital

serving 19.3 million patients annually. In addition, there are medical centers in the Czech Republic, Malta, Morocco, the United States, and other countries.

== Background ==
The university is located at 1200 Cai Lun Road, Zhangjiang Hi-Tech Park, Pudong New Area, Shanghai, covering an area of 35 hectares.

In the list of Best Global Universities by the U.S. News & World Report, Shanghai University of Traditional Chinese Medicine ranks #1449 overall, and #45 in pharmacology and Toxicology.

As of 2025, there are 9,073 students, 1,300 faculty members, with 3 academicians of the Chinese Academy of Sciences and Chinese Academy of Engineering. Three disciplines are of ESI top 1%.

The university has built international cooperation in medical treatment, education and research with over sixty medical institutions in 30 countries and reasons.

The university publishes several journals, including the Chinese Medicine and Culture (中医药文化), Journal of Acupuncture and Tuina Science (上海针灸杂志), Shanghai Journal of Traditional Chinese Medicine (上海中医药杂志), and the Journal of Shanghai University of Traditional Chinese Medicine (上海中医药大学学报).

In addition, the university hosts the Shanghai Museum of Traditional Chinese Medicine.

== See also ==
- Beijing University of Chinese Medicine
- List of medical schools in China
