= Shuguang Hospital =

Hospital in Shanghai, China

Shuguang Hospital (Chinese: 曙光醫院)

Geography
- Location: West campus: No. 185, Puan Road, Huangpu District, Shanghai; East campus: No. 528, Zhangheng Road, Pudong New Area, Shanghai, China

Organisation
- Type: Public general TCM hospital
- Affiliated university: Shanghai University of Chinese Medicine

History
- Founded: 1906

Links
- Website: www.sgyy.cn

Shuguang Hospital, full name "Shuguang Hospital Affiliated to Shanghai University of Chinese Medicine", is a comprehensive hospital in Shanghai, China, specializing in Traditional Chinese Medicine (TCM). Founded in 1906, Shuguang Hospital is now a 3A hospital and a national demonstration base for TCM, responsible for medical treatment, education and research.

== History ==
In 1906, the Ningbo Association of Compatriots in Shanghai established a clinic in Ningshou Lane, Baxianqiao, Shanghai.

In 1922, the clinic was expanded to become "Siming Hospital", located on Ailai Road (now Taoyuan Road, Huangpu District, Shanghai).

In March 1953, the hospital was renamed "Municipal Tenth People's Hospital".

In 1960, the Municipal Tenth People's Hospital and Municipal Eleventh People's Hospital merged to form "Shuguang Hospital affiliated with Shanghai College of Chinese Medicine".

In 1979, the "Xiaozhiling" (Chinese: 消痔灵) injection, developed through research in traditional Chinese medicine external applications, won the Ministry of Health's Major Scientific and Technological Achievement Award.

In August 1983, the Emergency Research Laboratory of Traditional Chinese Medicine Internal Medicine was established.

In 1992, Shuguang Hospital was rated as a 3A hospital.

In 1993, the hospital was renamed "Shuguang Hospital Affiliated to Shanghai University of Chinese Medicine".

In 2001, Shuguang Hospital passed the ISO9001 quality management system certification, and became the first TCM hospital to win the honor in China.

On December 28, 2004, the East Campus of the hospital was completed and put into trial operation.

In 2010, Shuguang Hospital was among the hospitals selected to serve the Shanghai World Expo.

== Current situation ==
Shuguang Hospital is now a 3A hospital and a national demonstration base for Traditional Chinese Medicine in China. It is also an International Collaboration Base of the State Administration of Traditional Chinese Medicine.

Shuguang Hospital has two campuses, located on the east and west side of the Huangpu River:

- West Campus: No. 185, Puan Road, Huangpu District, Shanghai;
- East Campus: No. 528, Zhangheng Road, Pudong New Area, Shanghai.

The hospital has more than 70 departments and specialties, featuring hematology, orthopedics, cardiovascular diseases, nephrology, endocrinology, clinical pharmacy, digestive diseases, acupuncture, anorectal diseases, pulmonary diseases, gynecology, intensive care and nursing.

In 2024, the hospital served 4.2 million outpatient and emergency visits and had 105,400 inpatient discharges. There are 1,423 beds in total.

There are 2,382 medical employees, including 72 supervisors of PhD students.

The hospital published 12 papers listed in Nature Index for the Time frame of 1 February 2025 - 31 January 2026, ranking 696th globally and 252nd in China.

== Notable deceased figures ==
Li Keqiang, former Premier of the State Council of the People's Republic of China, suffered a sudden heart attack while swimming in Shanghai at around noon of 26 October 2023. He was accompanied by his wife Cheng Hong. Li Keqiang was rushed to Shuguang Hospital (East Campus) by security and medical personnel after the incident. All available resources were mobilized, including top experts from Shanghai and the installation of an extracorporeal membrane oxygenation (ECMO) device. The emergency rescue efforts lasted for over 10 hours, before Li died at 12:10 a.m. the next day.

== See also ==
- Shanghai University of Chinese Medicine
