= Japanese campuses of foreign universities =

Japanese universities

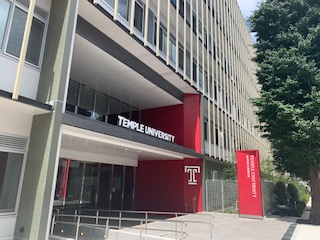
Temple University, Japan Campus

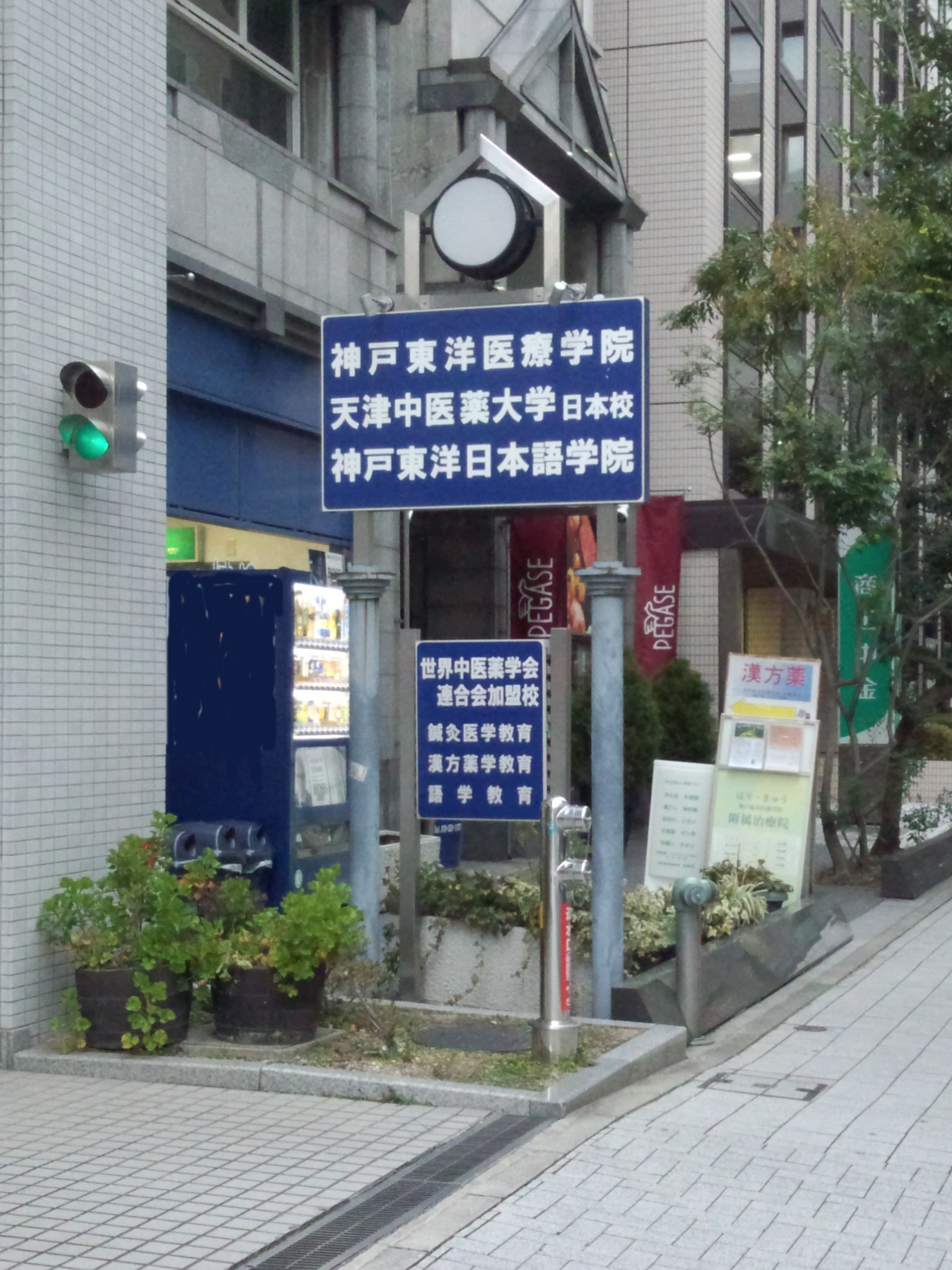
Tianjin University of Traditional Chinese Medicine, Japan Campus

A Japanese campus of a foreign university (外国大学の日本校, gaikoku daigaku no nihonkō) is an educational facility established in Japan by a foreign university outside of Japan whose accreditation is recognized by the Ministry of Education, Culture, Sports, Science and Technology-Japan (MEXT).

== History ==
Since the 1980s, some foreign universities, mainly from the United States, have set up their campuses in Japan. In the 1990s, there were approximately 40 Japanese campuses of foreign universities. Because almost all of them were from American universities, those campuses were often referred to as Japanese campuses of American universities. Since then, the majority of the schools have withdrawn, and in the 2000s, several universities from countries other than the United States opened Japanese campuses, decreasing the ratio of American universities. Therefore, as of 2021, such campuses are generally lumped together as Japan campuses of foreign universities.

The Japanese campuses were not legitimate universities under the Japanese School Education Law because the main campus of these universities was an accredited university in its home country (foreign country outside of Japan), and the majority of their Japanese campuses provided a regular curriculum conforming to the laws and regulations of the home country. Therefore, their curricula were based on foreign education policies and not approved by MEXT. Furthermore, graduates of universities in foreign countries were generally eligible to apply for admission to Japanese graduate schools, but graduates of a foreign university’s Japanese campus were not eligible. Because there were no special treatments under other laws and regulations, most of those Japanese campuses were treated as unaccredited.

Moreover, many campuses, especially American ones, had difficulty recruiting students because they could not gain the trust of parents due to the structure being so different from that of Japanese universities. For example, unlike in the Japanese system, it is easy to enter a school without taking examinations, but it is difficult to advance to the next grade. It is not unusual for students to drop out without being able to graduate. As a result, by the end of the 1990s, most of the campuses, except a few, had withdrawn and closed.

However, in the early 2000s, MEXT revised the legal status of Japanese campuses, including the admission qualifications for Japanese graduate schools. This revision improved the student recruitment condition.

Still, Japanese campuses approved by MEXT are not approved as Japanese universities under the Japanese School Education Law. Rather, they are designated as providing the same quality of education as that of the corresponding university campus(es) in a foreign country. Because the Japanese campuses are now stably positioned within the Japanese legal system, graduates of these campuses are allowed to enroll in graduate schools, transfer to Japanese universities, and transfer credits.

== Student privileges ==
In addition, because these universities are conspicuously positioned in the law as foreign universities located in Japan, they have increasingly been treated in the same way as Japanese universities. The following are privileges commonly applicable to Japanese university students. Because Japan campuses of foreign universities have been designated as foreign universities in Japan, the enrolled students have also been eligible for the following:

- Purchase of a student commuter pass for public transportation.
- Receive a loan-type scholarship from the Japan Student Services Organization, an independent administrative agency. Because they are foreign universities, they are eligible for the Type 2 Scholarship (Overseas).
- Special exception for student payment of National Pension.
- Issuance of Japanese student visas to international students from outside Japan.

== List of Japan campuses of foreign universities ==
As of October 2, 2022, the Japan campuses of foreign universities designated by MEXT are as follows (the dates in parentheses are designation notification dates):

- Temple University Japan Campus (February 14, 2005) – University/Graduate School/Junior College
- Lakeland University Japan Campus (December 15, 2005) - University/Junior College
- Russian Far Eastern Federal University of Hakodate (June 23, 2006) - University/Junior College
- Kobe School of Acupuncture and Moxibustion, Tianjin University of Traditional Chinese Medicine (September 20, 2006) - University
- Beijing Language and Culture University Tokyo Campus (April 15, 2015) - University
- Shanghai University Tokyo Campus (June 28, 2019) - University
- Jinan University Japanese School (October 27, 2021) - University/Graduate School
- Arizona State University Thunderbird School of Global Management Global Initiative at Hiroshima University (April 28, 2022) - University

The following campuses are closed:

- Carnegie Mellon University Japan Campus (December 15, 2005-March 2020) - Graduate School
- Columbia University Teachers College Japan Campus (1987-August 2013) - Graduate School
- Alliant International University, California Graduate School of Clinical Psychology Japan School (December 25, 2014-August 2020) - Graduate School
- McGill University Japan Campus (April 15, 2015-September 2020) - Graduate School
