= China Academy of Chinese Medical Sciences =

Education organization in Beijing, China

- 中国中医科学院
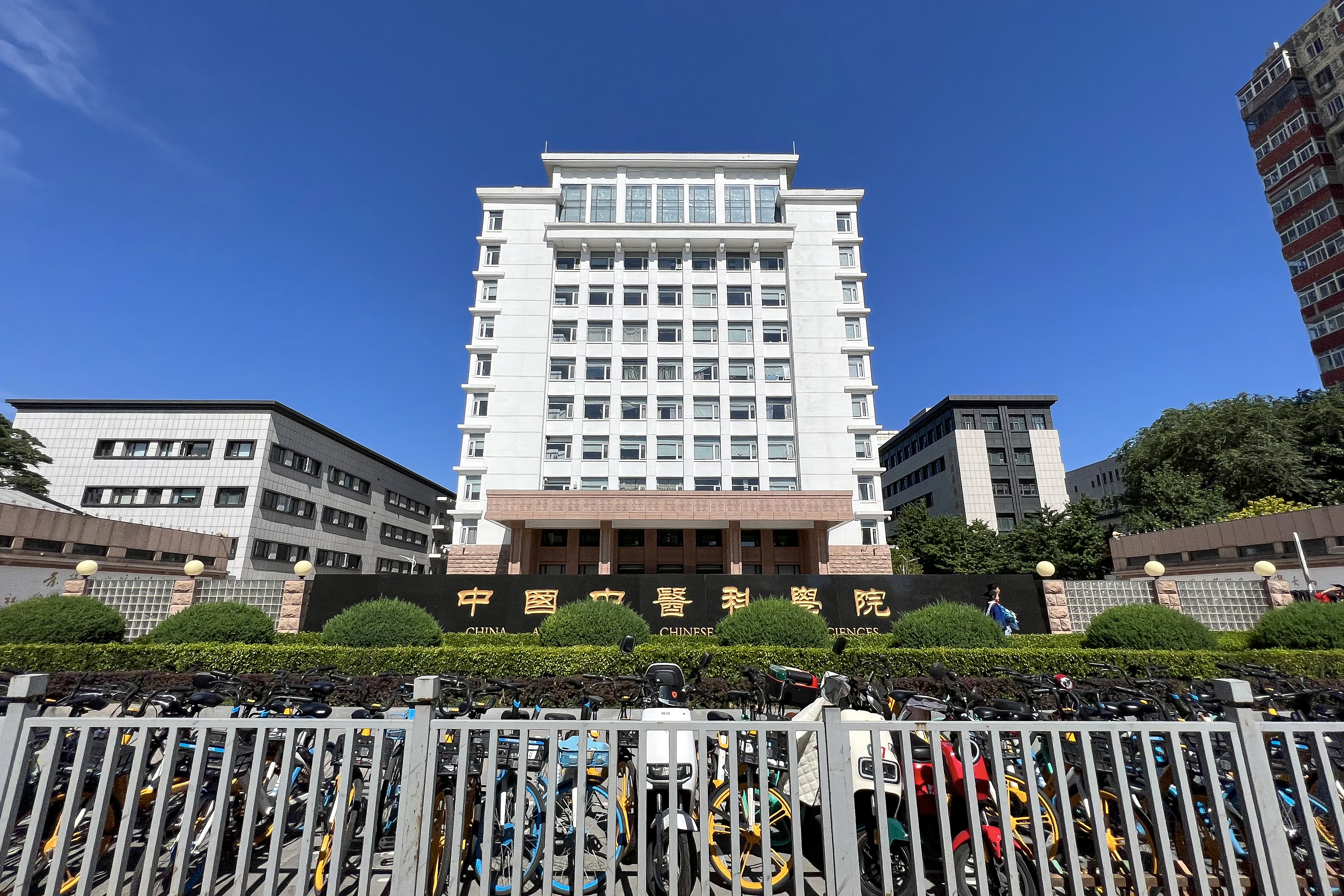
- West Gate, China Academy of Chinese Medical Sciences
- Type: Public
- Established: 1955; 71 years ago
- Affiliations: National Administration of Traditional Chinese Medicine
- President: Luqi Huang
- Location: Beijing, China
- Campus: Urban
- Website: www.cacms.ac.cn

Chinese name
- Simplified Chinese: 中国中医科学院
- Traditional Chinese: 中國中醫科學院
Transcriptions
Standard Mandarin
- Hanyu Pinyin: Zhōngguó Zhōngyī Kēxuéyuàn

The China Academy of Chinese Medical Sciences (CACMS), or "China Academy of Traditional Chinese Medicine", is a comprehensive research institution directly under the State Administration of Traditional Chinese Medicine of the People's Republic of China. Established in 1955, the academy has developed into a large medical institution with a number of research institutes, hospitals and a graduate school. Nobel Prize winner Tu Youyou is a staff member of CACMS.

== History ==
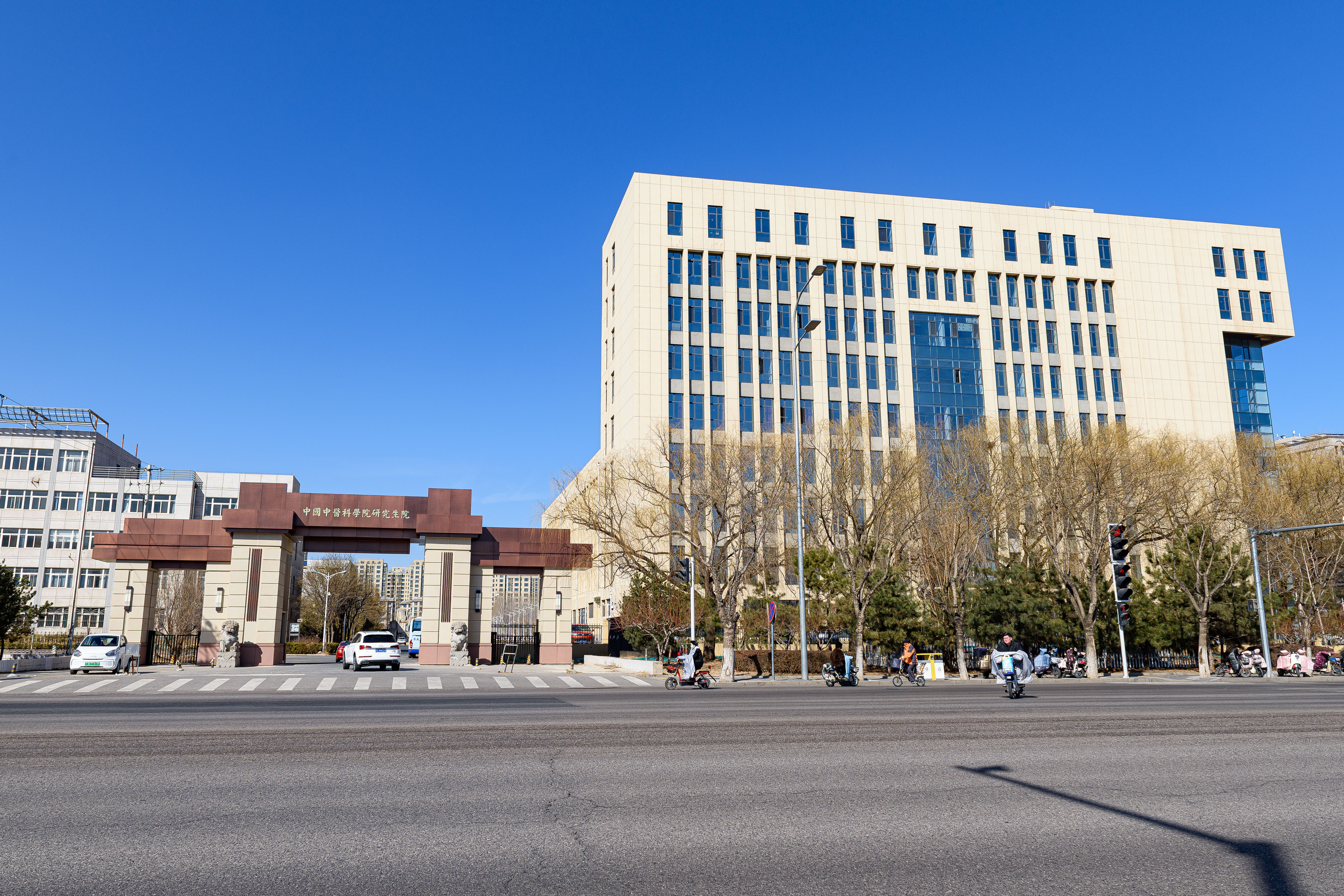
CATCM Graduate School Pinggu Campus

In 1955, the Academy of Chinese Medical Sciences was established directly under the Ministry of Health.

In 1984, the graduate department was established.

In 1986, the academy's affiliation was changed to be directly under the State Administration of Traditional Chinese Medicine.

In 1996, the “Research on Syndrome of Blood Stasis as well as Promoting Blood Circulation and Removing Blood Stasis” was awarded first prize of the State Science and Technology Progress Award (China).

In 2005, the Academy was renamed the "China Academy of Chinese Medical Sciences" (CACMS) with the approval of the Central Institutional Organization Commission Office. In the same year, the graduate department became the first graduate school approved by the National Administration of Traditional Chinese Medicine.

In 2015, Tu Youyou of CACMS was awarded the 2015 Nobel Prize in Physiology or Medicine. She is the first medical Nobel Prize owner in China.

In 2019, Tu Youyou won the Medal of the Republic, P.R. China

In 2020, the academy sent TCM medical teams to assist Hubei Province fighting against the COVID-19 epidemic, and developed traditional Chinese medicines for its treatment.

By the end of 2021, the academy had 6,500 employees, 5 academicians, and 3 WHO Collaborating centers. It also hosted the China Association for Acupuncture and Moxibustion, Chinese Association of Integrative Medicine and the World Federation of Acupuncture-Moxibustion Societies.

On February 28, 2024, the CACMS Graduate School Pinggu Campus was officially inaugurated.

== Present situation ==
CACMS has four State Key Laboratories and centers, and four national clinical research bases.

The school has the largest Chinese medicine library in China, with over 360,000 books.

The academy published 135 papers listed in Nature Index for the Time frame of 1 January 2025 - 31 December 2025, ranking 1079th globally and 309th in China.

CACMS hosts a number of journals, including

- Chinese Journal of Integrative Medicine
- Journal of Traditional Chinese Medicine (SCI-E)

The academy had built national-level overseas Traditional Chinese Medicine (TCM) centers jointly with the United States, the United Kingdom, Germany, Norway, Italy and Austria. It has also held seminars in over 100 countries

Address: No.16, Nanxiao Street, Dongzhimen, Dongcheng District, Beijing, 100700, China.

== Notable figures ==
They include

- Tu Youyou, winner of the 2015 Nobel Prize in Physiology or Medicine.
- Zhang Boli
- Li Lianda
- Tong Xiaolin

== Second-level public institutions ==
- Institute of Traditional Chinese Medicine
- Institute of Acupuncture and Moxibustion (Acupuncture Hospital)
- Institute of Basic Theory of Traditional Chinese Medicine
- Institute of Information on Traditional Chinese Medicine
- Institute of History and Literature of Chinese Medicine
- Institute of Basic Clinical Medicine of Traditional Chinese Medicine (Research Center for Standards of Traditional Chinese Medicine)
- Medical Experimental Center
- Xiyuan Hospital (Institute of Cardiovascular Diseases, Institute of Geriatrics)
- Guang'anmen Hospital (Institute of Oncology)
- Wangjing Hospital (Institute of Orthopedics and Traumatology)
- Eye Hospital (Institute of Ophthalmology)
- Graduate School
- Institute of Traditional Chinese Medicine Health Industry

with over 3,000 patient beds, and an annual 7 million outpatient (emergency) visits and 80,000 patients discharges.

== See also ==
- National Administration of Traditional Chinese Medicine
- Chinese Academy of Medical Sciences
