= Master of Chinese Medicine =

Master of Chinese Medicine (simplified Chinese: 国医大师; traditional Chinese: 國醫大師; pinyin: Guóyī Dàshī), or Guoyi Dashi, full name "National Masters of Traditional Chinese Medicine", is the highest title awarded by the National Administration of Traditional Chinese Medicine of the People's Republic of China to top experts in traditional Chinese medicine. The recipients are entitled to the same benefits and honors as those recognized at the provincial or ministerial level. The selection of "Masters of Chinese Medicine" began in 2009 and takes place every five years, each time with thirty individuals selected nationwide.

== Honorees ==
It has been awarded in 2009, 2014, 2017, and 2022. Each time the honor was awarded to thirty people.

== See also ==
- National Administration of Traditional Chinese Medicine
