= Xinhui People's Hospital =

Hospital in China

Coordinates: 22.5182°N 113.0221°E

- Traditional Chinese: 新會人民醫院
- Simplified Chinese: 新会人民医院
Transcriptions
Standard Mandarin
- Hanyu Pinyin: Xīnhuì Rénmín Yīyuàn
Yue: Cantonese
- Jyutping: san1 wui5 jan4 man4 ji1 jyun6*2

Logo

Xinhui People's Hospital is a hospital located in the Xinhui District of Jiangmen City, Guangdong Province, China, affiliated to the Southern Medical University.

== Synopsis ==
The hospital was founded in December 1949 and has grown to cover a total area of 140,000 square metres (1,500,000 sq ft). It features a hospital headquarters, a clinic and three outpatient departments. The hospital has 1110 beds, a staff of 1,200 and offers preventive health care, general medical, emergency medical, medical research, clinical teaching and training in one of the Xinhui District's largest general hospitals.
