= Nanfang Hospital =

Nanfang Hospital, Southern Medical University
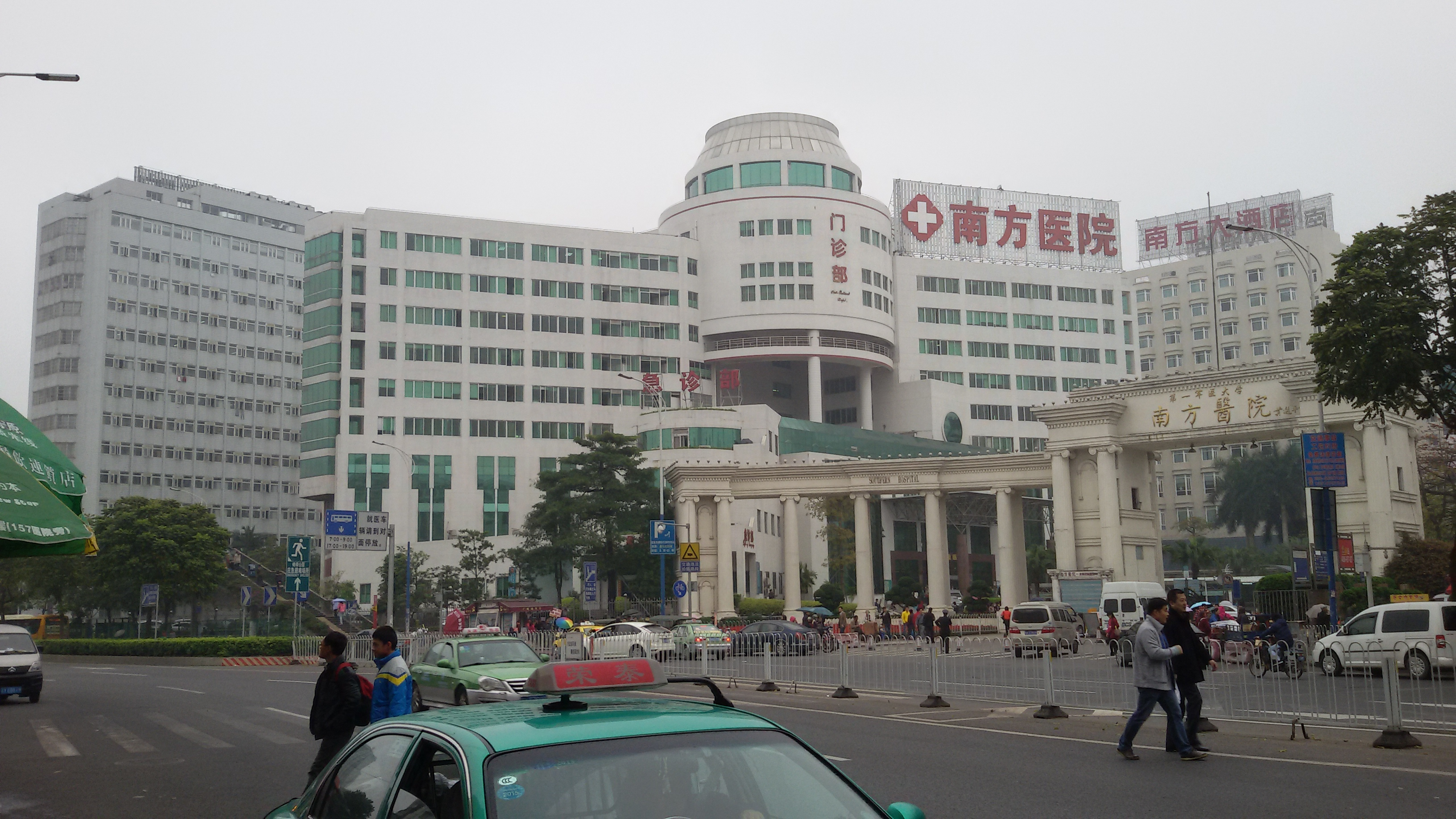
- Outpatient Building at the Headquarters

Geography
- Location: No. 1838, North Guangzhou Avenue, Guangzhou, China

Organisation
- Type: public, general, teaching
- Affiliated university: Southern Medical University

Services
- Standards: 3A hospital
- Beds: 3,601

History
- Founded: 1941

Links
- Website: https://www.nfyy.com/en/
- Lists: Hospitals in China

Nanfang Hospital (simplified Chinese: 南方医院; traditional Chinese: 南方醫院; pinyin: Nánfāng Yīyuàn; lit. 'southern hospital'), full name Nanfang Hospital of Southern Medical University, is the First Affiliated Hospital and First Clinical School of Southern Medical University. It is a comprehensive grade A tertiary hospital for clinical care, medical education, scientific research, and preventive healthcare in Guangzhou of southern China.

== History ==
- In the autumn of 1941, the New Fourth Army Third Division Rear Hospital was established in Funing County, Jiangsu Province, China.
- In 1945, the Third Division moved northward. In 1946, it merged into the Western Manchuria Military Region, and the Western Manchuria Military Region Rear Hospital was established.
- In 1951, the hospital was renamed the "Affiliated Hospital of the Military Medical School of the Northeast Military Region of the Chinese People's Liberation Army".
- In 1953, it was renamed the "Affiliated Hospital of the 11th Military Medical Middle School of the Chinese People's Liberation Army". Later in the same year, it was renamed the "Affiliated Hospital of the 11th Military Medical School of the Chinese People's Liberation Army".
- In 1958, it was renamed the "Affiliated Hospital of Qiqihar Medical College".
- In 1962, it was renamed the "Affiliated Hospital of Qiqihar Medical College of the Chinese People's Liberation Army".
- In 1966, it was renamed the "Affiliated Hospital of the Chinese People's Liberation Army Medical College".
- In 1969, the hospital moved to Changsha. In 1970, it moved to Guangzhou of Guangdong Province.
- In 1975, it was renamed the "Affiliated Hospital of the First Military Medical University of the Chinese People's Liberation Army", and was known externally as the "Nanfang Hospital" (Southern Hospital), and was stationed at Qilingang, Guangzhou.
- In 1994, it was rated as a 3A hospital.
- In August 2004, along with the First Military Medical University, the hospital was handed over from the People's Liberation Army to Guangdong Province and renamed the "First Clinical Medical School of Southern Medical University", or "Nanfang Hospital".

== Current situation ==
Nanfang Hospital has two campuses and several branch hospitals.

- Headquarters campus: The main campus is located at No. 1838, Guangzhou Avenue North, Jingxi Street, Baiyun District, Guangzhou, covering a land area of 203,000 square meters, and a construction area of 458,000 square meters.
- Zengcheng Campus (Central Hospital of Zengcheng District, Guangzhou): Located at No. 28, Chuangxin Avenue, Ningxi Street, Zengcheng District.
- Baiyun Branch (Guangzhou Baiyun District People's Hospital):
  - Huangshi Hospital: No. 23, Yuanxiadi Road, Huangshi Street, Baiyun District.
  - Shahe Hospital: No. 1305, Guangzhou Avenue, Shahe Street, Tianhe District.
- Taihe Branch (Taihe People's Hospital, Baiyun District, Guangzhou): located at No. 53, 57 and 59, Taihe Middle Road, Taihe Town, Baiyun District.
- Ganzhou People's Hospital (Nanfang Hospital Ganzhou Hospital): Located at No. 16, Meiguan Avenue, Zhanggong District, Ganzhou City, Jiangxi Province.
- Huiqiao Medical Center: Founded in October 1979, one of the earliest and largest medical institutions in China serving the most overseas patients.

Nanfang Hospital is an output hospital for the construction of national regional medical centers, and is the National Regional Trauma Centre jointly built by the National Health Commission and Guangdong Province. It has distinctive advantages in the diagnosis and treatment of digestive diseases, kidney diseases, blood diseases, and cardiovascular diseases, among others. In 2018, there were 4,271 professional and technical personnel and 3,601 beds at the hospital, 3,254,600 emergency cases were attended, and 119,000 patients were discharged.

In addition, the hospital undertakes the teaching work of more than 2,500 full-time undergraduate students and more than 1,000 full-time graduate students each year.

There are 111 medical and therapeutic departments, the national key laboratory for organ failure prevention and control, and the National Clinical Medical Research Center for chronic kidney disease. And there are two doctoral degree authorization disciplines (Clinical medicine and Stomatology) and one post-doctoral research station for clinical medicine.

== Ranking ==
Nanfang Hospital has been a top-20 hospital for years in the Chinese Hospital Rankings released by the Hospital Management Institute of Fudan University.

== See also ==
- Southern Medical University
- First Affiliated Hospital of Sun Yat-sen University
