= First Affiliated Hospital of Sun Yat-sen University =

Hospital in Guangzhou, China

Geography
- Location: No. 58, Zhongshan 2nd Road, Nonglin Street, Yuexiu District, Guangzhou City, Guangdong Province, China
- Coordinates: 23°7′46.97″N 113°17′6.77″E

Organisation
- Care system: Public
- Type: Teaching, District General
- Affiliated university: Sun Yat-sen University

Services
- Emergency department: Yes

History
- Founded: 1910

Links
- Website: https://www.fahsysu.org.cn/en/home
- Lists: Hospitals in China

First Affiliated Hospital of Sun Yat-sen University
- Simplified Chinese: 中山大学附属第一医院
- Traditional Chinese: 中山大學附屬第一醫院
Transcriptions
Standard Mandarin
- Hanyu Pinyin: Zhōngshān Dàxué Fùshǔ Dìyī Yīyuàn
Yue: Cantonese
- Jyutping: zung1saan1 daai6hok6 fu6suk6 dai6jat1 ji1jyun2

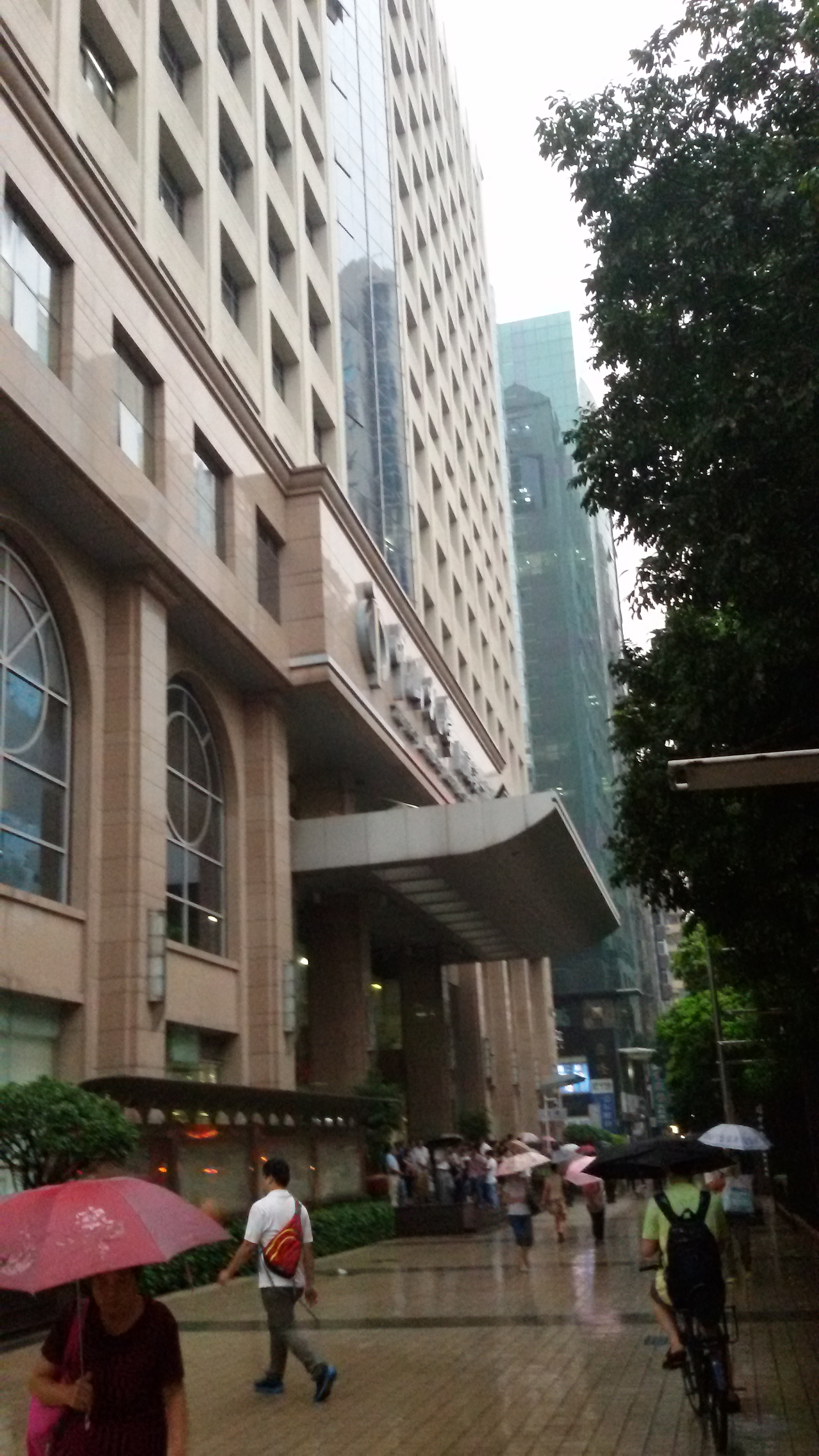
Entrance of Dongshan Branch of the First Affiliated Hospital of Sun Yat-sen University

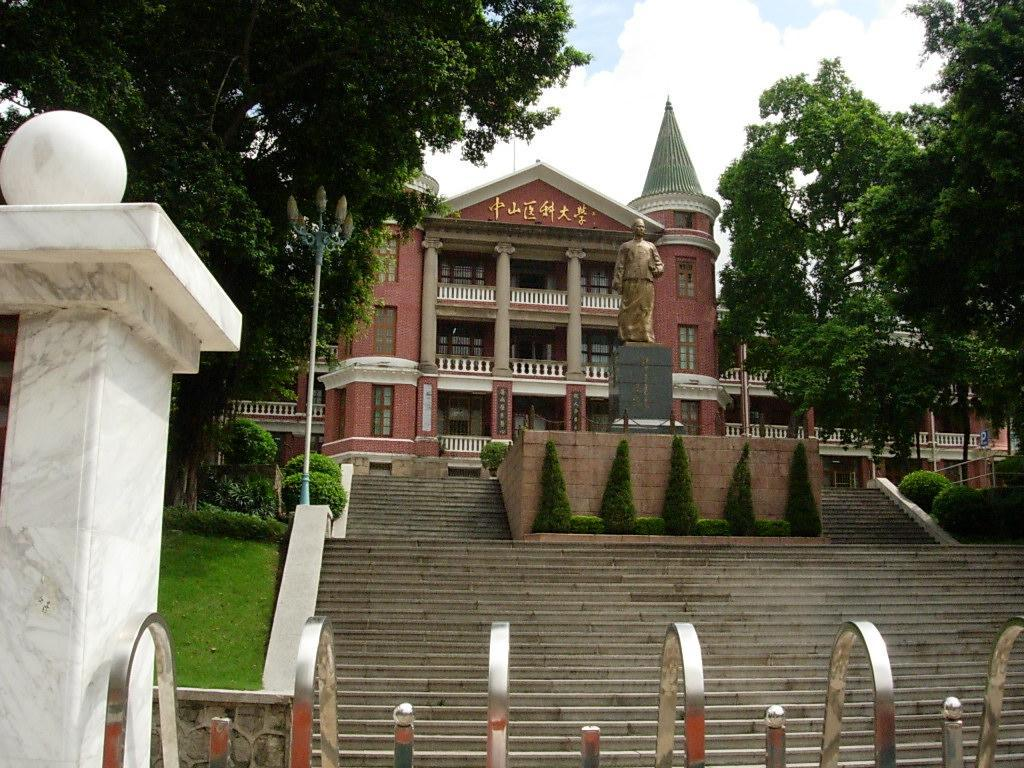
Sun Yat-Sen University of Medical Sciences

The First Affiliated Hospital of Sun Yat-sen University (FAH-SYSU), also known as "Zhongshan First Hospital", is a large 3A hospital with its headquarters located in Yuexiu District of Guangzhou. Founded in 1910, it is one of the oldest and most well-known comprehensive hospitals in South China. The hospital is affiliated to Sun Yat-sen University and is directly managed by the National Health Commission. It is well known for its excellent service in China and Southeast Asia.

== History ==
The hospital was founded in 1910 by American medical missionary Dr. Paul Jerome Todd with 40 western doctors, originally called the Affiliated Hospital of Guangdong Public Institution of Medicine.

In 1953, Zhongshan Medical School, or Sun Yat-sen Medical College, was founded, with Dr. Lin KE, a prominent medical educator in China, as its first president. And the hospital was renamed the First Affiliated Hospital of Sun Yat-sen Medical College.

In 1985, the school was renamed Sun Yat-sen University of Medical Sciences, and the hospital renamed First Affiliated Hospital of Sun Yat-sen University of Medical Sciences.

In 2001, after the merger of Sun Yat-sen University and Sun Yat-sen University of Medical Sciences, the hospital was renamed First Affiliated Hospital of Sun Yat-sen University.

On August 29, 2014, the surgery building of the Yuexiu Campus of the First Affiliated Hospital of Sun Yat-sen University (95.76 meters high and 25 floors) was officially opened. It is now also known as the "Ke Lin Building" or "Building 5".

In the 2023 performance monitoring results of tertiary public hospitals released by the National Health Commission, the First Affiliated Hospital of Sun Yat-sen University was rated the highest grade A++, i.e., within the top 1%.

Starting from 28 June 2024, Hong Kong elderly persons can use their health care vouchers at the First Affiliated Hospital, Sun Yat-sen University.

On March 13, 2025, the Liu Luanxiong Medical Complex Building of the Yuexiu Campus of the First Affiliated Hospital of Sun Yat-sen University officially opened. The building includes the Women and Children Center, International Medical Center, Surgery Center, Imaging and Radiotherapy Center and Sports Medicine Center, as well as a helicopter landing pad on the roof to escort emergency treatment. Since 2009, the Hong Kong Liu Luanxiong Foundation has donated 400 million Chinese yuan to support the construction of the Medical Complex and other projects.

== Directly affiliated divisions ==
Zhongshan First Hospital is composed of the following divisions (branch hospitals).

=== Headquarters ===
The headquarters, also called Yuexiu Division, is located at No. 58, Zhongshan 2nd Road, Yuexiu District, Guangzhou. On July 28, 2006, the former "Guangzhou Dongshan District People's Hospital" was transferred to the First Affiliated Hospital of Sun Yat-sen University for operation and management, becoming the "Dongshan Division of the First Affiliated Hospital of Sun Yat-sen University" (located at No. 1, Zhongshan 2nd Road, Yuexiu District, Guangzhou City, and is currently the location of the hospital's gynecology and reproductive medicine center).

=== East Division ===
The East Division of the First Affiliated Hospital of Sun Yat-sen University is located at No. 183, Huangpu East Road, Huangpu District, Guangzhou. It was formerly the Huangpu District People's Hospital, taken over by the former Sun Yat-sen University of Medical Sciences in 1999, and was named "Huangpu Division of the First Affiliated Hospital of Sun Yat-sen University" in 2001. It was changed to its current name in October 2013.

=== Nansha Division ===
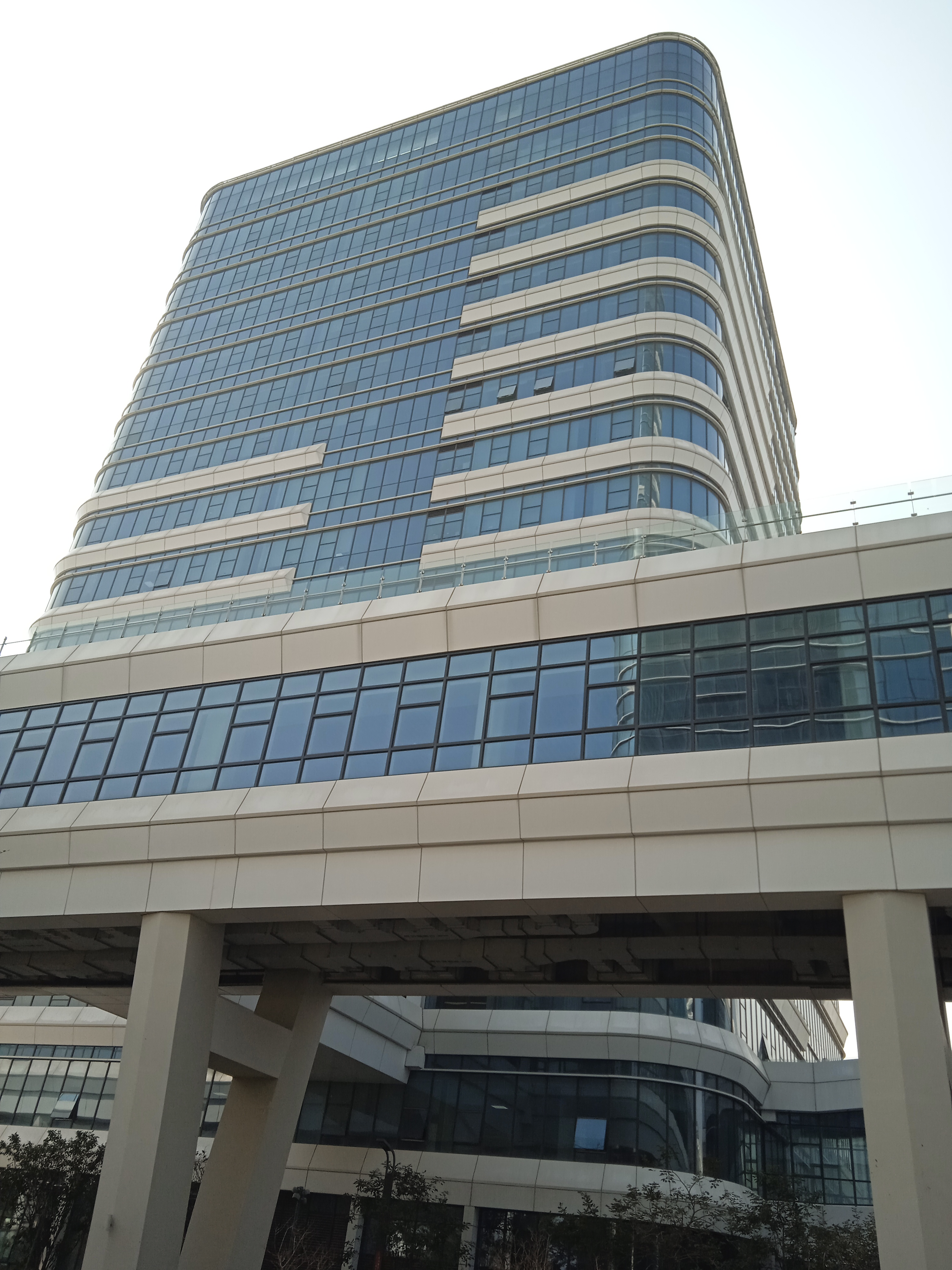
Nansha Branch, the First Affiliated Hospital of Sun Yat-sen University

The Nansha Division of the First Affiliated Hospital of Sun Yat-sen University is located at No. 8 Hexing Road, Hengli Town, Nansha, Guangzhou, with 1,500 beds available. It serves both local people and those from the Hong Kong and Macao special administrative regions. It was officially opened on March 29, 2023.

== Regional Medical Center ==
The First Affiliated Hospital of Sun Yat-sen University is building a healthcare network as a National Regional Medical Center, including the following hospitals.

=== Hui Ya Hospital ===
The Hui Ya Hospital of the First Affiliated Hospital of Sun Yat-sen University is located at No. 186, Zhongxing North Road, Daya Bay District, Huizhou City, Guangdong Province. It is wholly owned by the Daya Bay District Management Committee of Huizhou City, and the First Affiliated Hospital of Sun Yat-sen University is fully responsible for its operation and management. Hui Ya Hospital officially opened on November 12, 2013.

=== Guizhou Hospital ===
The First Affiliated Hospital of Sun Yat-sen University, Guizhou Hospital, is located in Gui'an New District, Guizhou Province. On July 14, 2022, the People's Government of Guizhou Province signed an agreement with Sun Yat-sen University First Affiliated Hospital to build the Guizhou Hospital, the First Affiliated Hospital of Sun Yat-sen University, based on the Gui'an Hospital, Affiliated Hospital of Guizhou Medical University.

=== Guangxi Hospital ===
The Guangxi Hospital, the First Affiliated Hospital of Sun Yat-sen University, is located at No. 3, Fuziling Road, Qingxiu District, Nanning City, Guangxi Zhuang Autonomous Region. It was jointly built by the People's Government of Guangxi Zhuang Autonomous Region and Sun Yat-sen First Hospital based on the East Hospital of Guangxi Zhuang Autonomous Region People's Hospital. It is a national regional medical center project and was put into operation on January 7, 2023.

== International cooperation ==
By 2025, FAH-SYSU had built international partnership with over 40 medical institutions, including Mass General Brigham, Dana-Farber Cancer Institute, University of California (Berkeley and Davis) in the U.S., the University of Birmingham, the International Association for Health Professions Education (AMEE) in the U.K., Nanyang Technological University in Singapore, etc.

== See also ==
- Zhongshan School of Medicine, Sun Yat-sen University
- Sun Yat-sen University
- List of hospitals in China
