= Wannan Medical College =

Provincial public medical school in Wuhu, Anhui, China

- 皖南医学院
- Motto: 精医尚德，求实自强
- Motto in English: Professional and Kind, Factualistic and Strong
- Established: 1958
- President: Zhang Yao (章尧)
- Location: Wuhu, Anhui, China
- Website: www.wnmc.edu.cn

Wannan Medical College (Chinese: 皖南医学院; pinyin: Wǎnnán Yīxuéyuàn) is provincial public medical college in Wuhu, Anhui, China. It is affiliated with the Anhui Provincial Government.

== History ==
The school was founded in 1958, known as Wuhu Medical Vocational School. In 1970, it merged into Anhui Medical College and functioned as its branch in South Anhui. In 1974, with the approval of Ministry of Education, the school became an independent institution and was renamed Wannan Medical College (WNMC).

In 1981, the college was among the first list of colleges and universities with authority to award bachelor's and master's degrees vested by the Academic Degree Evaluation Committee under the State Council. In 1998, it successfully passed the evaluations of its undergraduate programs, which is organized by the Ministry of Education.

== Academics ==
The college now offers 18 undergraduate specialties covering clinical medicine, nursing, oral medicine and forensic medicine, and 9 vocational specialties. In postgraduate program, there are 15 master's degree authorized units, covering nearly all the branches of the basic and clinical medicine. There are also 10 research centers in the college.

== Campus ==
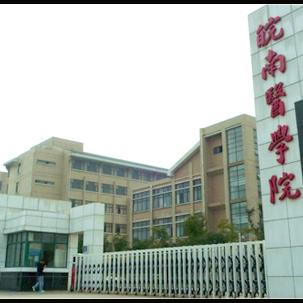
Wannan Medical College Old Campus

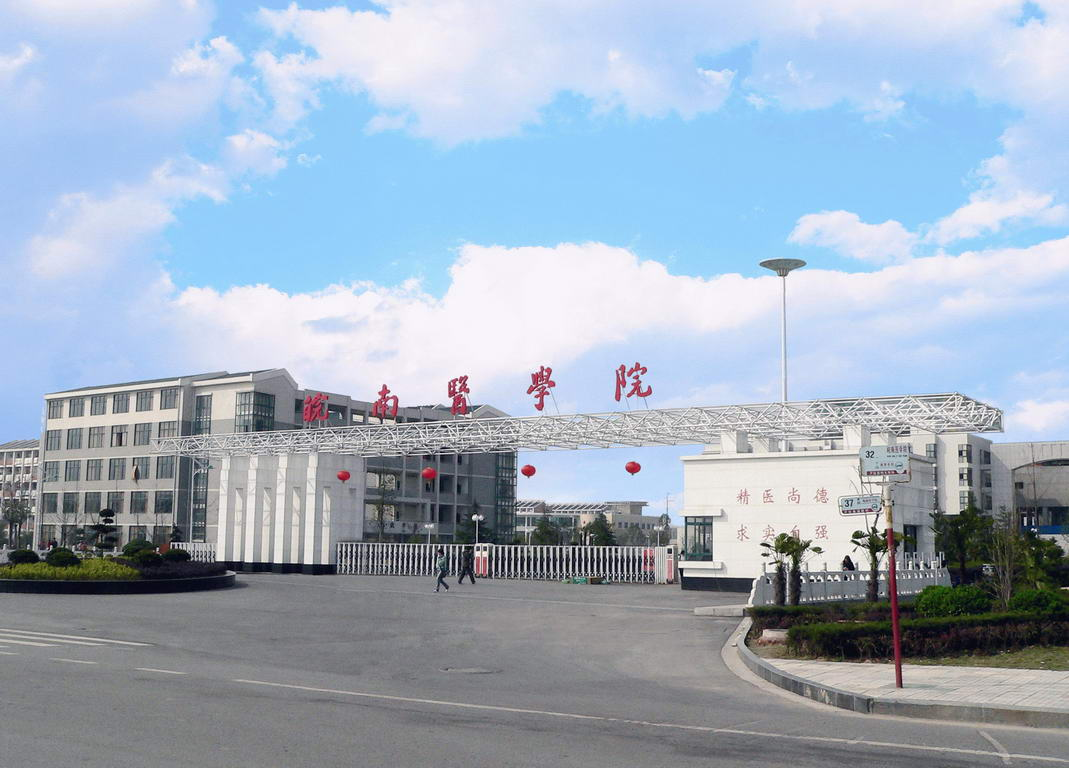
Wannan Medical College New Campus

The medical college consists of three campuses, all in Wuhu city.

The old campus (including the adult college and one nurses' school) enjoys fine environment with Iron Hill on the south and Zheshan Park on the east.

The second campus (the biggest one) is on Weiliu Road, University Park of Wuhu city.

The third campus, which is under construction, is in University Park.

== Students ==
There is no data about the current students. But it is said at least more than 12,000 students are now studying in this college. The majority is full-time undergraduate students as well as postgraduate students.

Employment rate of the graduates of this school ranks higher in the list of the provincial colleges and universities. In 2006, 95.22% of the graduations were employed successfully. In 2005, the employment rate was 97.21%.

== Departments ==
There are varied departments including Department of Nursing, Department of Basic Medicine department, Department of Anesthesia, Department of Stomatology, Department of Forensic medicine, Department of Pharmacy, Department of Psychology, Department of Iconography and Department of Humanities and Administration.

Among these, the Department of Humanities and Administration is the most integrative one because it contains five medical-related fields: Medical Law, Medical Insurance, Information Management and System Program, Health Service Management, Public Utilities.

== Research disciplines ==
The college is a medicine-focused and integrative medical institution of higher learning; it is also a fully accommodated medical institution. In 2008, it offers 18 undergraduate specialties including Clinical Medicine, Nursing, Forensic Medicine, Medical Law, Applied Psychology, Anesthesiology, Medical Imageology, Stomatology, Information Management and System Program, Pharmacy, Pharmaceutical Engineering, Public Utilities. In postgraduate specialties, there are 16 master's degree authorized units, 85 areas covering almost all branches of basic and clinical medicine and interdisciplinary subject.

According to the official data in 2006, there are also 10 experimental centers and 93 research laboratories belong to the college. Some programs like Medical Law, Information Management and System Program and Public Utilities are newly developed disciplines that represent the new-born multidisciplinary programs concerning medical in China.

The college publishes two academic journals both domestic and abroad: The Journal of Wannan Medical College and The Journal of Clinical Pharmacology and Therapeutics of China.

== Faculty ==
In accordance with the data of 2007, there were over 2123 full-time faculty, including about 125 professors, 310 associate professors, 560 adjunct professors and 49 experts who enjoy special subsidies of the Chinese government.

== Teaching affiliates ==
- Yijishan Hospital (Chinese: 皖南医学院附属弋矶山医院; pinyin: Wǎnnán yīxué yuàn fùshǔ yì jī shān yīyuàn, also called the First Affiliated Hospital of Wannan Medical College)

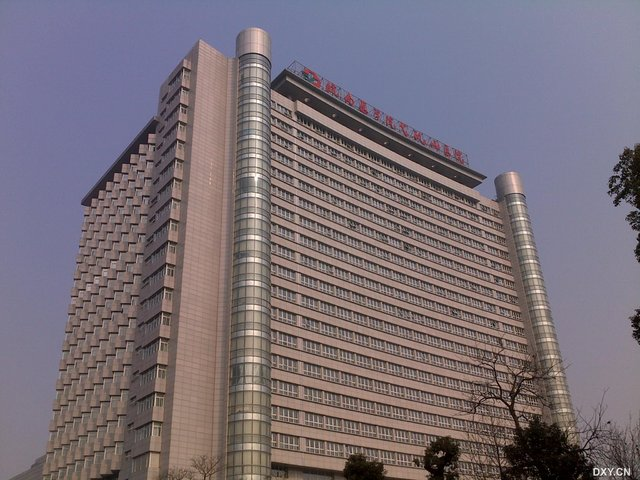
Yijishan Hospital Surgery building

Yijishan Hospital is an 3A-level hospital awarded by Ministry of Health. It is the biggest provincial medically and technically instructional center of health care, teaching, scientific research, prevention, rehabilitation, and emergency medicine in the south of Anhui province.

Covering a land of 18 hectares with the construction area of 170,000 square meters, Yijishan Hospital has 2100 ward beds, 40 clinical sections, 14 technical sections, and 21 teaching and research divisions. Of 2100 hospital employees, there are over 400 chief and deputy chief physicians, pharmacists and nurses (professor's and associate professor's level), and more than 300 staffs with doctoral degree (PhD or MD) or master's degree.

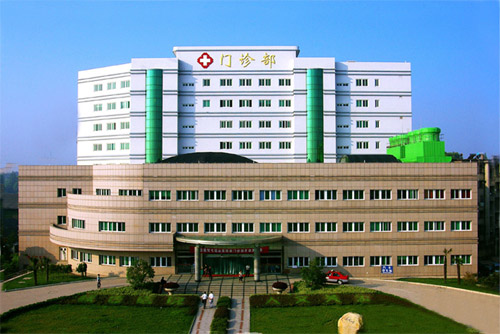
Yijishan Hospital Outpatient building

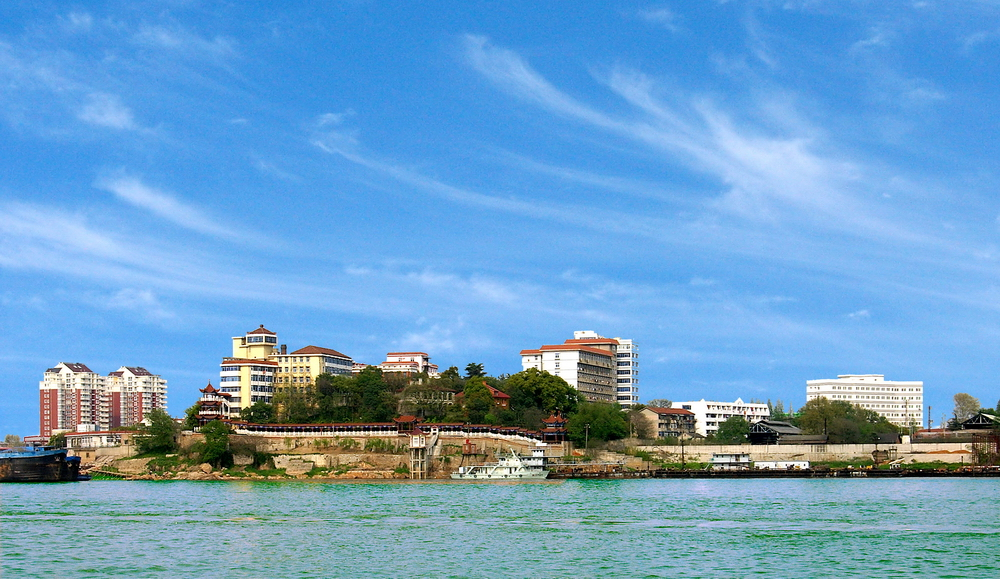
Yijishan Hospital prospect from Yangtze River

Yijishan Hospital owns many kinds of up-to-date equipment, such as 64-row spinner CT, Phillips ECR with two detectors, Phillips two-bore DR, Kodak DR and CR, three Siemens DSAs, dynamic digital gastrointestinal angiography machine, mammography breast machine, color Doppler ultrasound imaging equipment including Phillips IE33, Siemens 512, GEE8 and so on. It is equipped with high-grade, precision and advanced inspection machines: ultrasound endoscope, capsule endoscopy, soft and hard cavity scopes, high frequency surgical unit, brain stereotactic instrument, microendoscopic discectomy, arthroscopy, microscope and 7600 Hitachi automatic biochemical analyzer, USA Beckman automatic blood instrument, Japan Hitachi automatic blood instrument, France STAGO automatic blood clots instrument, Beckman Flow Cytometer, Roche fluorescent PCR, and the tumor-treating equipment including Elekta high-energy accelerator with the strong function, after loader, microwave heat treatment machines and so on.

=== History ===
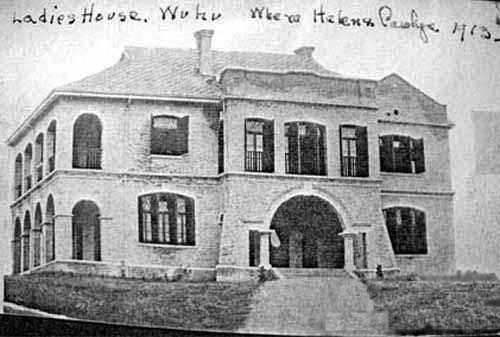
Yijishan Hospital historical building

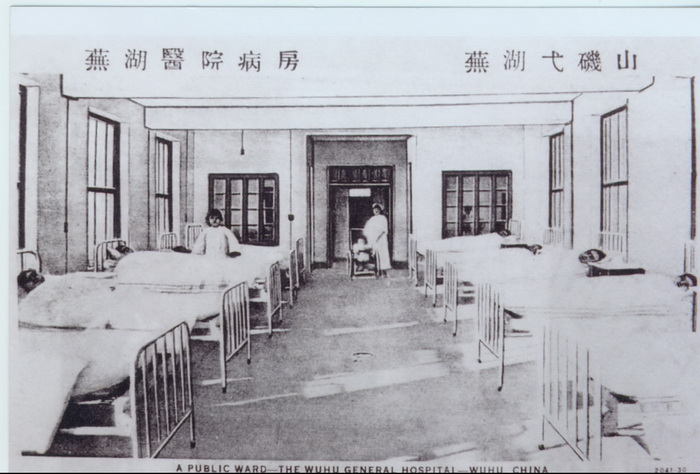
Yijishan Hospital Ward

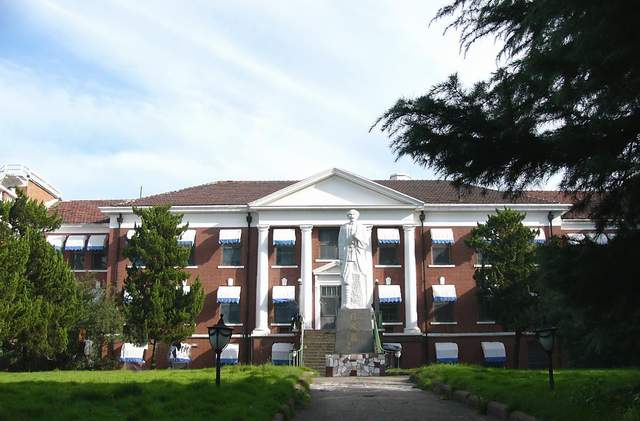
Yijishan Hospital historical relics

The college hospital is at Yiji mountain of Wuhu City, Anhui Province, which is next to the Yijishan scenic zone near the Yangtze River. The hospital has a history of more than 120 years since it was founded by American Methodist Episcopal Church in 1888 and is the oldest/continuous western hospital in Anhui Province. The Reverend Dr. Virgil C. Hart bought the property to the surprise of the British Navy, who were negotiating to use Yijishan as a naval base.* It is where many famous medical experts in China once worked, including Wu Shaoqing, Shen Kefei, and Chen Cuizhen. Professor Li Jiren from the Traditional Chinese Medicine department has been awarded the 'National Master of Traditional Chinese Medical Science' in the first batch of honor name list in China.

- Xuancheng Area Hospital (Chinese: 皖南医学院附属宣城地区医院; pinyin: Wǎnnán yīxué yuàn fùshǔ xuān chéng dìqū yīyuàn, also called the Second Affiliated Hospital of Wannan Medical College)
