= Shandong University of Traditional Chinese Medicine =

Public Medical School in Shandong, China

- 山东中医药大学
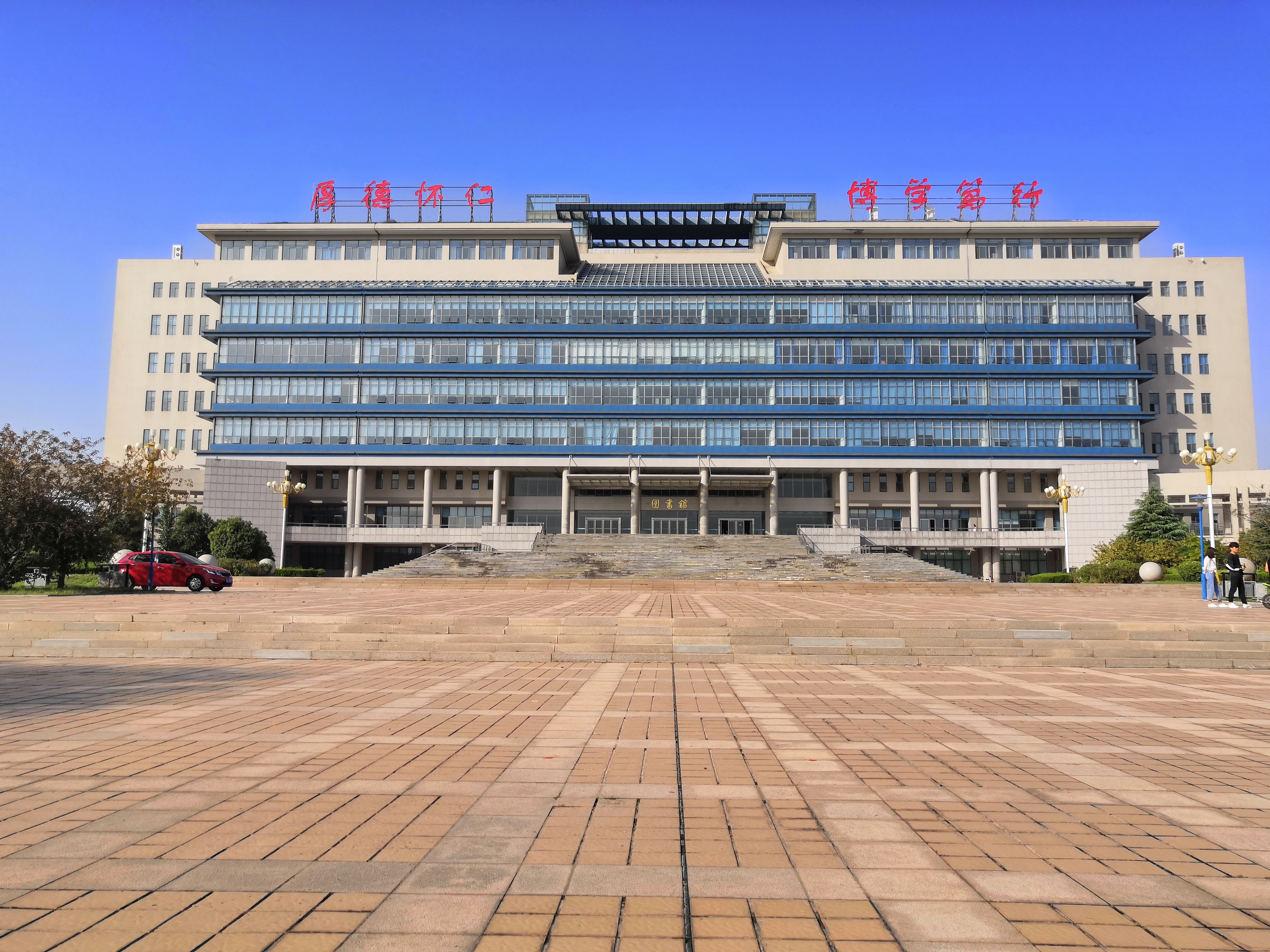
- Former names: Shandong College of TCM
- Type: Public university
- Established: 1958
- Affiliations: Shandong Provincial Hospital of TCM, Shandong Provincial Hospital of Combined Western and Chinese Medicine
- Students: 18,600
- Undergraduates: 2,100
- Postgraduates: 220
- Location: Jinan, Shandong, China; 36.65015382036671°N 117.04613665543104°E
- Campus: Changqing Campus, Lixia Campus
- Website: www.sdutcm.edu.cn

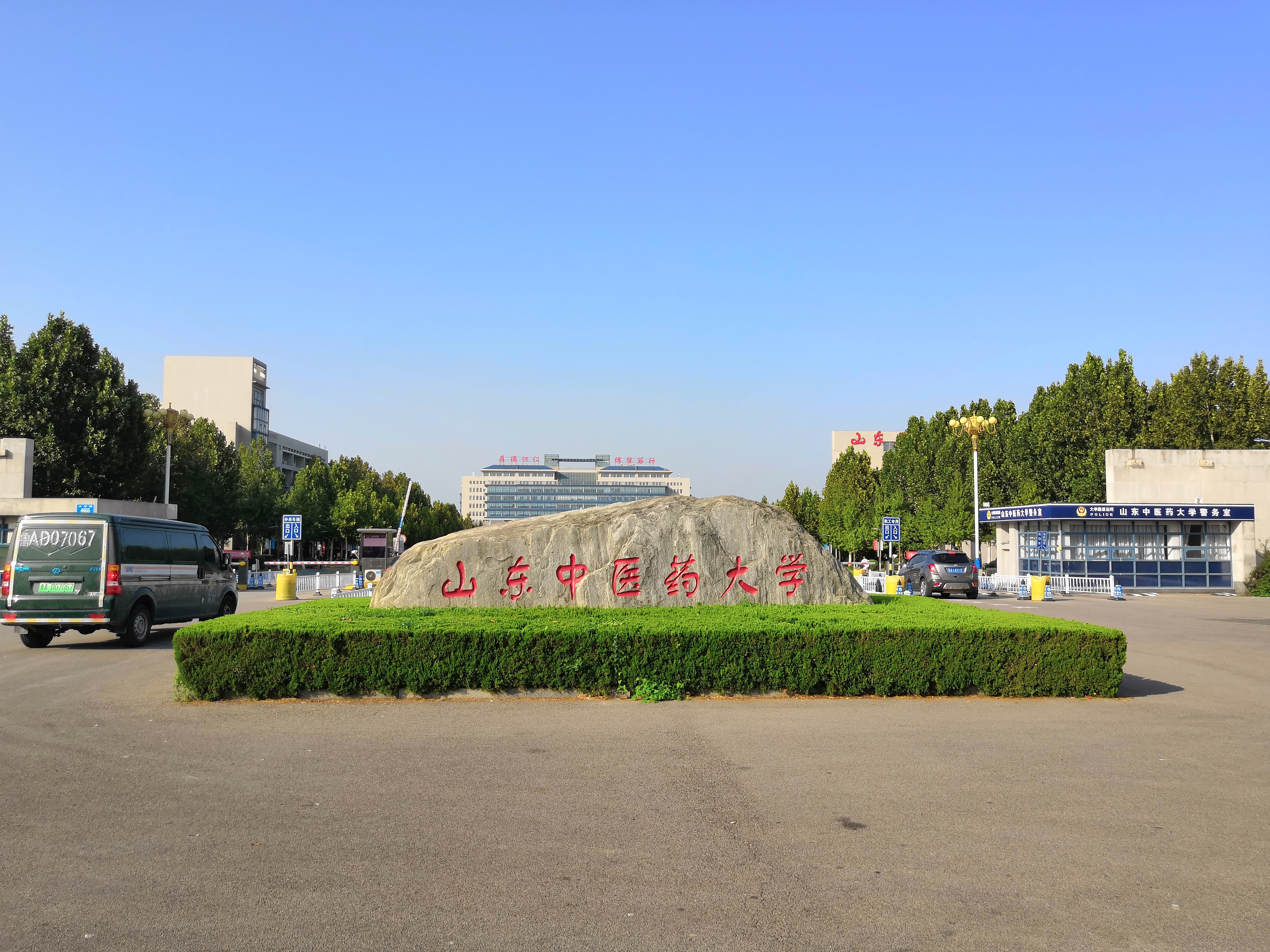
South Gate of Shandong University of Traditional Chinese Medicine

The Shandong University of Traditional Chinese Medicine (山东中医药大学) is a university based in Jinan City, Shandong Province, China.

== History ==
It was established on October 16, 1958 as the Shandong Traditional Chinese Medicine College. In 1978, the college became a national college for Traditional Chinese Medicine College. In 1981, the college was classified as a higher education institution in the province. In 1996, the university restructured into a public university and became officially as the Shandong University of Traditional Chinese Medicine.
