= Southern Medical University =

Provincial public medical university in Guangzhou, Guangdong, China

Coordinates: 23.1862°N 113.3337°E

- 南方医科大学
- Former name: First Military Medical University
- Type: Public university
- Established: 1951; 75 years ago
- Affiliations: Project 973; ASRMU; GHMUA
- Location: Shatai North Road, Guangzhou, Guangzhou (Main Campus), Foshan (Shunde Campus), Guangdong, 510515, China
- Campus: Urban
- Website: www.fimmu.com

Chinese name
- Simplified Chinese: 南方医科大学
- Traditional Chinese: 南方醫科大學
Transcriptions
Standard Mandarin
- Hanyu Pinyin: Nánfāng Yīkē Dàxué

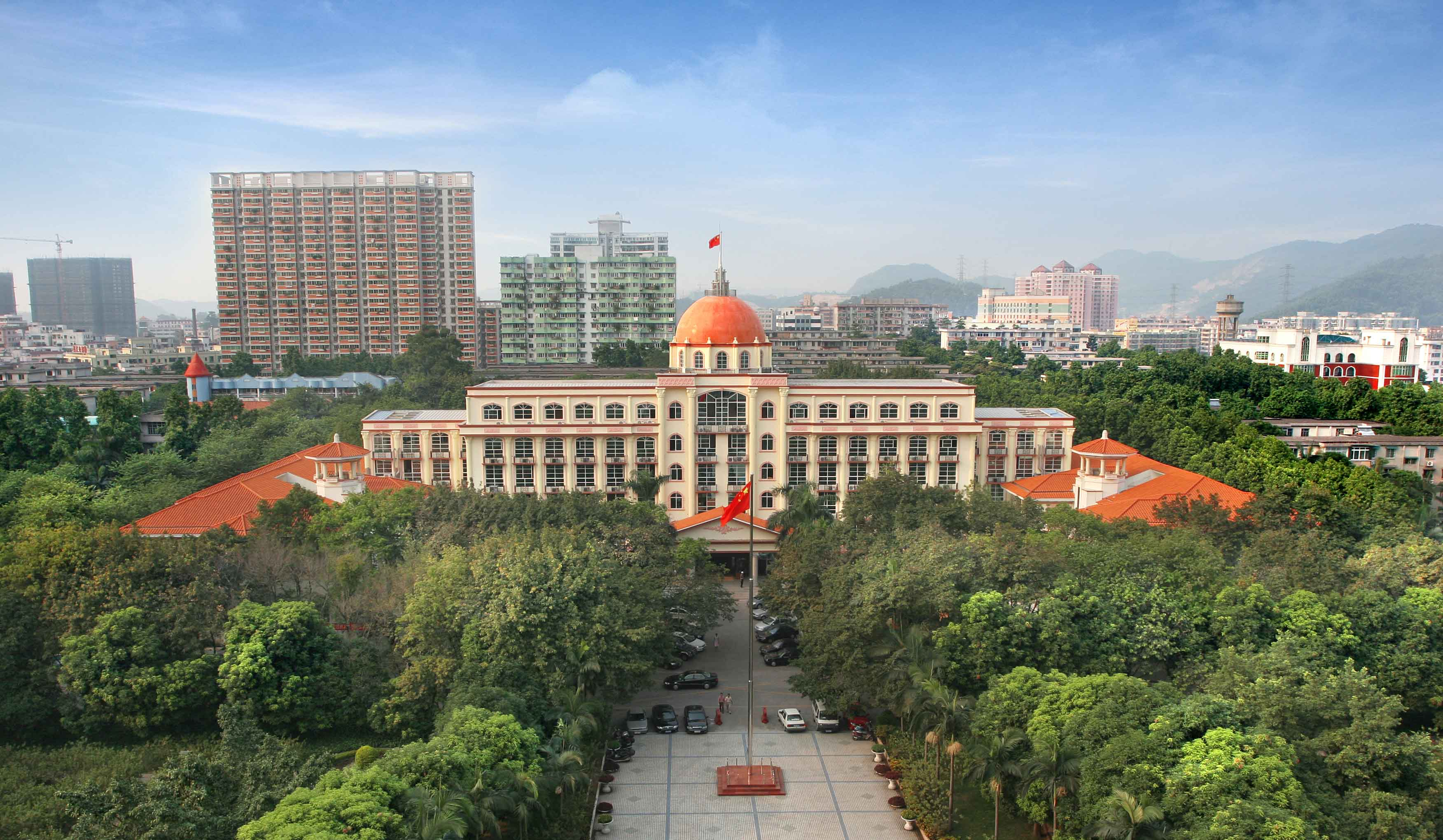
Administration building

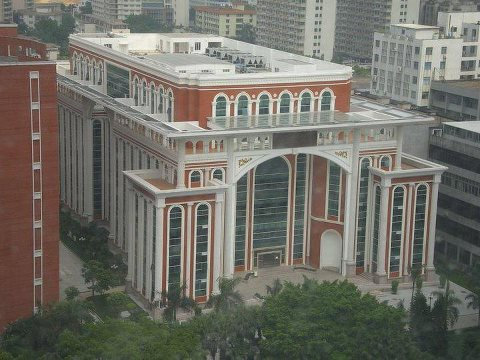
SMU library on main campus

Southern Medical University (南方医科大学) is a provincial public medical university in Baiyun, Guangzhou, Guangdong, China. Formerly as a military-affiliated medical university, the whole institution was transferred to the Guangdong Provincial People's Government and became a provincial public university in 2004. It is now wholly owned by the Guangdong Provincial People's Government.

Southern Medical University is in the foothills of the picturesque Baiyun Mountain in Guangzhou. The main campus, together with its south campus in the southern suburb of Guangzhou, covers an area of nearly one square kilometer. Its gardens are known for rows of green trees and bouquets of flowers blossoming on its campuses all throughout the year.

The university has expanded and now includes the Shunde Campus in Foshan City.

== History ==
=== People's Liberation Army First Military Medical University (Previous name of Southern Medical University) ===
In August 1951, to meet the needs of the Korean War, the Northeast Military Region decided to establish the Northeast Military Region Medical School of the Chinese People's Liberation Army (PLA), based on the Second Army Hospital of the PLA. It was located in Qiqihar, and was officially founded on October 30, 1951, under the direct leadership of the Health Department of the Logistics Department of the Northeast Military Region. Li Ziping, Deputy Minister of the Health Department, served as the first president.

In January 1953, in accordance with the Central Military Commission's directive to unify the sequence of all military medical schools, the institution was renamed the People's Liberation Army No. 11 Army Medical Secondary School. It had a two-year program aimed at training military medical assistants to serve in troop health and medical care.

In May 1954, according to the military-wide Reorganization Plan for Army Medical Secondary Schools, the institution was renamed the People's Liberation Army No. 11 Army Medical School. It offered a three-year program with the goal of training second-level military doctors.

On January 18, 1956, the school was placed under the leadership of the General Logistics Department of the People's Liberation Army. In March 1956, the school and its affiliated hospital were transferred from the Shenyang Military Region to the leadership of the General Logistics Department of the PLA.

In June 1958, the school was collectively transferred to civilian administration, coming under the leadership of the Ministry of Health of the People's Republic of China (some sources state it was transferred to the Heilongjiang Provincial Government). The No. 11 Army Medical School merged with the No. 2164 Hospital and was renamed Qiqihar Medical College, upgraded to a higher medical education institution. The program length was extended from three years to five years.

In January 1962, the school (including its affiliated hospital) was returned to the organizational structure of the General Logistics Department of the People's Liberation Army. It was renamed the People's Liberation Army Qiqihar Medical College and offered a three-year program, primarily aimed at training in-service military officers.

On October 21, 1966, the institution was renamed the "People's Liberation Army Military Medical College."

In August 1969, the school was relocated to Changsha, Hunan Province. At that time, the school received an official notice from the General Logistics Department of the People's Liberation Army, stating that, with the approval of the Central Committee, the school would be moved from Qiqihar City to the former campus of the PLA Engineering Corps Academy in Changsha, Hunan Province. The relocation officially began on October 3, 1969.

On February 4, 1970, according to a notice from the General Logistics Department of the People's Liberation Army, and with the approval of Premier Zhou Enlai, the State Council and the Central Military Commission allocated the former campus and facilities of Jinan University in Shipai, Guangzhou, Guangdong, which had been closed at the time, to the General Logistics Department's Military Medical College for use. The institution retained the name "People's Liberation Army Military Medical College" and relocated to the former Jinan University campus in Guangzhou, coming under the temporary administration of the Guangzhou Military Region.

In April 1970, the People's Liberation Army Guangzhou Military Region Health School was merged into the institution.

On July 24, 1975, according to Document No. 95 issued by the Central Military Commission, approval was granted to transfer the Military Medical College, previously under the administration of the Guangzhou Military Region, to the leadership of the General Logistics Department of the People's Liberation Army. To standardize institutional designations, the former PLA Military Medical College was renamed the First Military Medical University of the People's Liberation Army, under the organizational structure of the General Logistics Department. From that point onward, it was officially known as the PLA First Military Medical University.

In 1976, the university established a Department of Traditional Chinese Medicine.

In February 1978, the General Staff Department of the People's Liberation Army incorporated the PLA No. 103 Hospital, formerly under the Fuzhou Military Region, into the organizational structure of the First Military Medical University, designating it as the Second Affiliated Hospital (known externally as Zhujiang Hospital). The university's original affiliated hospital became the First Affiliated Hospital, known externally as Nanfang Hospital.

In 1978, the original Jinan University resumed operations. In April 1978, with the support and care of Ye Jianying, the Central Military Commission approved the establishment of a new campus site for the First Military Medical University at Qilinkang, in the northeastern suburbs of Guangzhou.

In 1978, the university changed its program length to four years and began enrolling students nationwide. In 1978, the university changed its program length to four years and began enrolling students nationwide.

In 1979, the university was designated a national key institution, the program length was extended to five years, and it began enrolling master's degree students.

In February 1980, Ye Jianying personally inscribed the university's name in his own handwriting.

In November 1992, the People's Liberation Army Guangzhou Military Region Health School was merged once again, becoming the Nursing Department of the First Military Medical University.

In June 1993, the site and most of the staff of the Nursing Department of the First Military Medical University were transferred to the Guangzhou Military Region and reorganized as the People's Liberation Army Guangzhou Medical College.

In July 1999, the People's Liberation Army Guangzhou Medical College was merged once again into the First Military Medical University.

In 2004, the university was approved as one of the first eight higher education institutions in China to pilot an eight-year medical education program.

=== People's Liberation Army Guangzhou Medical College (Previous name of Southern Medical University) ===
In October 1964, the People's Liberation Army Guangzhou Military Region Health School was established through the merger of the PLA Guangzhou Military Region Nursing School and the medical training programs of the PLA Guangzhou Military Region General Hospital, the PLA No. 163 Hospital, and the PLA No. 303 Hospital. The school was located in Chigang, Guangzhou, Guangdong Province.

In April 1970, it was merged into the People's Liberation Army Military Medical College.

In August 1974, the school was separated from the Military Medical College and reorganized as the People's Liberation Army Guangzhou Military Region Medical School, under the Logistics Department of the Guangzhou Military Region. The main campus included a Training Department, Political Department, and Administrative Department, and it oversaw a teaching hospital — the PLA No. 197 Hospital.

In July 1986, the institution was renamed the People's Liberation Army Guangzhou Military Region Health School.

In November 1992, it was merged into the People's Liberation Army First Military Medical University and renamed the Nursing Department of the PLA First Military Medical University.

In July 1999, as part of a military-wide reform of educational institutions and organizational structures, it was merged into the People's Liberation Army First Military Medical University.

=== Southern Medical University ===
In November 2003, during the 15th All-Army Conference on Military Academies, the Central Military Commission decided to transfer the entire First Military Medical University to local (civilian) administrationin response to the overall restructuring and reform of the military's organizational system.

On May 29, 2004, the General Office of the State Council and the General Office of the Central Military Commission issued the official document titled "Reply on the Transfer of Four Military Institutions Including the Quartermaster University" (Document No. 40 [2004]). The decision stated that the First Military Medical University would be transferred to the administration of Guangdong Province and would operate as an independent civilian institution.

On August 24, 2004, a handover ceremony was held in the auditorium of the university to mark the transfer of the First Military Medical University to Guangdong Province for civilian administration. The People's Liberation Army First Military Medical University was officially transferred in its entirety to the Guangdong provincial government and renamed Southern Medical University.

== Academics ==
This university offers courses in Clinical Medicine at the Bachelors and Masters levels, in Western medicine, traditional Chinese medicine, economics and medical-related fields. Students are also taught English (for Chinese students) and Mandarin Chinese (for foreign students) at the basic level.

Southern Medical University is recognized by the World Health Organization and by the Medical Council of India.

== Academic Achievement ==
=== Prizes ===
- 2 Second Prizes of National Natural Science
- 1 Second Prize of National Technological Invention
- 15 Second Prizes of National Scientific and Technological Progress
- 1 Excellence Award of National Patent
- 4 scientific and technological achievements were selected as "Ten National Progress of Science and Technology".

=== Research Labs & Centers ===
National Level	State Key Laboratory of Organ Failure Research
National Level	National Clinical Research Center for Chronic Kidney Disease
National Level	National TCM Theroputic Center for Rheumatosis Research
National Level	National Trauma Center for Regional Medical Care
National Level	National Research Institute of Healthcare and Medical Big Data
Ministry of Education	Key Laboratory of Organ Failure, Ministry of Education
Ministry of Education	Key Laboratory of Mental Health, Ministry of Education
Ministry of Education	Research Center for Digital Diagnosis and Treatment Equipment, Ministry of Education
Ministry of Education	The Medical Prevention Center for Nuclear, Biological and Chemical Emergency, Ministry of Education
Ministry of Education	Research Center for Treating Techniques and Equipment of Cerebrovascular Disease, Ministry of Education
National Administration of Traditional Chinese Medicine	Key Basic Laboratory of TCM Pharmaceutics of Acute Diseases, National Administration of Traditional Chinese Medicine
National Administration of Traditional Chinese Medicine	Key Laboratory of Melocular Biology, National Administration of Traditional Chinese Medicine
National Administration of Traditional Chinese Medicine	Key Laboratory of Traditional Chinese Pharmacology, National Administration of Traditional Chinese Medicine
National Administration of Traditional Chinese Medicine	Key Laboratory of Research and Development of Traditional Chinese Drugs, National Administration of Traditional Chinese Medicine
National Medical Products Administration	Key Laboratory for Research and Evaluation of Drug Metabolism
National Medical Products Administration	Key Laboratory for Safety Evaluation of Cosmetics
Provincial level	Guangdong-Hong Kong-Macao Greater Bay Area Center for Brain Science and Brain-inspired Intelligence
Provincial level	Guangdong Key Laboratory of Construction and Detection in Tissue Engineering
Provincial level	Guangdong Key Laboratory of Proteomics
Provincial level	Guangdong Key Laboratory of Single-Cell Measurements and Appliance
Provincial level	Guangdong Key Laboratory of Molecular Oncologic Pathology
Provincial level	Guangdong Key Laboratory of New Drug Screening
Provincial level	Guangdong Key laboratory of Shock and Microcirculation
Provincial level	Guangdong Key Laboratory of Medical Biomechanics
Provincial level	Guangdong Key Laboratory of Chinese Medicine Pharmaceutics
Provincial level	Guangdong Key Laboratory of Medical Image Processing
Provincial level	Guangdong Key Laboratory of Nephrology
Provincial level	Guangdong Key Laboratory of Virus Hepatitis Research
Provincial level	Guangdong Key Laboratory of Tropical Diseases Research
Provincial level	Guangdong Key Laboratory of Gastroenterology
Provincial level	Guangdong Key Laboratory of Psychiatric Disorders
Provincial level	Guangdong Key Laboratory of Bone and Joint Degenerative Diseases
Provincial level	Guangdong Key Laboratory of Minimally Invasive Treatment of Gastrointestinal Neoplasms
Provincial level	Guangdong Key Research Center for Radiodiagnostic and Treating Equipment
Provincial level	Guangdong Research Center for Genetic Monitoring
Provincial level	Guangdong Research Center for Translational Research in Molecular Diagnosis of Malignancy
Provincial level	Guangdong Research Center for Hepatofibrosis
Provincial level	Guangdong Biomedical Engineering Center for Gastrointestinal Diseases
Provincial level	Guangdong Engineering Center for Artificial Organ and Tissues
Provincial level	Guangdong Research Center for New Function and Safety Evaluation of Nutritious Products
Provincial level	The Medical Prevention Center for Nuclear, Biological and Chemical Emergency
Provincial level	Guangdong Biomaterial Engineering Center for Human Bones and Soft Tissues Research
Provincial level	Guangdong Research Center for Raising of Assay and Examination Minipigs
Provincial level	Guangdong Engineering Center for Electronic Evidence Identification
Provincial level	Guangdong Engineering Center for Traffic Accident Appraisal
Provincial level	Guangdong Engineering Technology Center for Serious Diseases' Rapid Diagnosing and Biosening Engineering
Provincial level	Guangdong Engineering Center for Clinical Digital Medicine
Provincial level	Guangdong Research Center for Translation and Appliance of Medical 3D Printing
Provincial level	Guangdong Research Center for Hepatopathy Treatment of TCM-WM Integrated Medicine
Provincial level	Guangdong Research Center for Multilayer Data Mining of Medical Image
Provincial level	Guangdong Research Center for Medical Radiophotographical Engineering
Provincial level	Guangdong Research Center for Minimally Invasive Surgery
Provincial level	Guangdong Research Center for Cardiovascular Disease and Biomedical Engineering
Provincial level	Guangdong Research Center for Integration and Appliance of Medical Big Data
Provincial level	Guangdong Research Center for Medical Endscope
Provincial level	Guangdong Research Center for Virtual Technology and Medicla Apparatus in Spinal Surgery
Provincial level	Guangdong Research Center for Clinical Medical Database
Provincial level	Guangdong Research Center for Clinical Translation of Stomatology
Platforms for Humanities and Social Sciences	Key Laboratory of Research and Evaluation of Public Health Policy
Platforms for Humanities and Social Sciences	Center for World Health Organization Research
Platforms for Humanities and Social Sciences	Guangdong Research Center for the Theoretical System of Socialism with Chinese Characteristics (SMU Branch)
Platforms for Humanities and Social Sciences	Guangdong Research Center for XI Jinping's New Era Socialist Thoughts with Chinese Characteristics (SMU Branch)

== Ranking and Reputation ==
=== University Ranking ===
University Ranking
QS	No Ranking (2024)
USNEWS	558 (2025)
Shanghai Ranking	301-400 (2024)
Times	251–300 (2025)

== Successive Headmasters ==
=== People’s Liberation Army First Military Medical University (Previous Name of Southern Medical University) ===
==== Presidents ====
- Li Ziping —1951 – ? President of the Northeast Military Region Medical School of the PLA.
- Wang Yizhi — March 1953 – ? President of the PLA No. 11 Army Medical Secondary School, PLA No. 11 Army Medical School, and Qiqihar Medical College of Heilongjiang Province; also served as Commissioner of Nenjiang Prefecture and President of the PLA Qiqihar Medical College.
- Ruan Hanqing — ? – September 1970 President of the PLA Qiqihar Medical College and the PLA Military Medical College.
- Zhao Yunhong — September 1970 – June 1975 President of the PLA Military Medical College; July 1975 – June 1990, President of the First Military Medical University.
- Chen Jingzao (Major General) — June 1990 – August 1991
- Yang Genyuan (Major General) — August 1991 – March 1996
- Bai Shuzhong (Major General) — March 1996 – August 1998
- Li Kang (Major General) — August 1998 – June 2004
- Zheng Muming (Major General) — June 2004 – August 2004 President of the First Military Medical University, during its transition to Southern Medical University.

=== Southern Medical University ===
==== Presidents ====
- Zheng Muming — August 2004 – October 2011
- Chen Minsheng — October 2011 – April 2013
- Yu Yanhong — April 2013 – January 2018
- Li Mengfeng — May 2019 – June 2025
- Ma Li — June 2025 – present

== Affiliated Hospitals ==
Southern Medical University flourishes along with its handover from the military system to the civilian one. Its seven affiliated hospitals.

- Nanfang Hospital
- Zhujiang Hospital
- Hua'nan Hospital
- Nanhua Hospital
- Stomatology Hospital
- Pingxiang Hospital
- Jiangdu Hospital
- Xinhui People's Hospital

Six of them have been appraised as “First-Class Hospitals at Grade III".
