= Tianjin University of Traditional Chinese Medicine =

Public medical university in Tianjin, China

The Tianjin University of Traditional Chinese Medicine (天津中医药大学) is a municipal public medical university in Tianjin, China. It is affiliated with the City of Tianjin, and co-funded by the Ministry of Education, the National Administration of Traditional Chinese Medicine, and the Tianjin Municipal People's Government. The university specializes in traditional Chinese Medicine. It is part of the Double First-Class Construction.

== See also ==
- Japanese campuses of foreign universities
