= National Administration of Traditional Chinese Medicine =

Chinese government medical body

- 国家中医药管理局
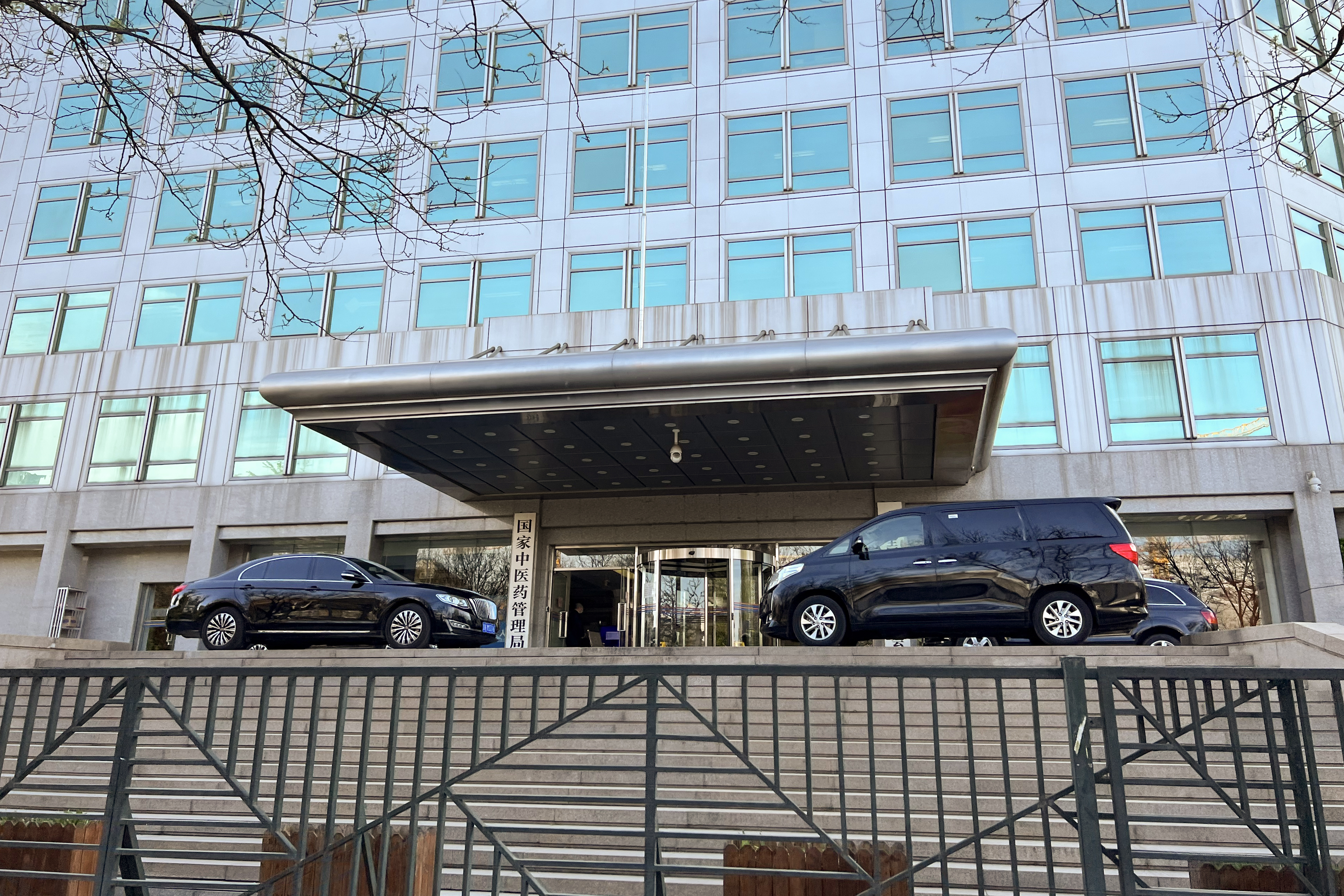
- Headquarters of the NATCM

Agency overview
- Formed: 1986; 40 years ago
- Jurisdiction: China
- Headquarters: 1 Gongti West Road, Dongcheng District, Beijing
- Agency executive: Yu Yanhong, Director
- Parent agency: National Health Commission
- Website: www.natcm.gov.cn

The National Administration of Traditional Chinese Medicine (NATCM; Chinese: 国家中医药管理局) is a national bureau of the People's Republic of China under the management of the National Health Commission, responsible for the regulation of traditional Chinese medicine industry.

The current director is Yu Yanhong.

== History ==
A section for TCM was present in the PRC's Ministry of Health formed in 1949. The section was gradually extended to have more power, and in 1986 the State Council decided to form the National Administration of Traditional Chinese Medicine.

The role and composition of NATCM was adjusted in 1998.

A larger change came about in 2018 as the State Council restructured the bureaucracy as part of the deepening the reform of the Party and state institutions.

== See also ==
- Master of Chinese Medicine
