= Military Medical University =

Military Medical University may refer to:

- First Military Medical University, now Southern Medical University
- Second Military Medical University
- Third Military Medical University
- Fourth Military Medical University
