= Wu Mengchao =

Chinese surgeon and medical scientist (1922–2021)

Wu Mengchao 吴孟超
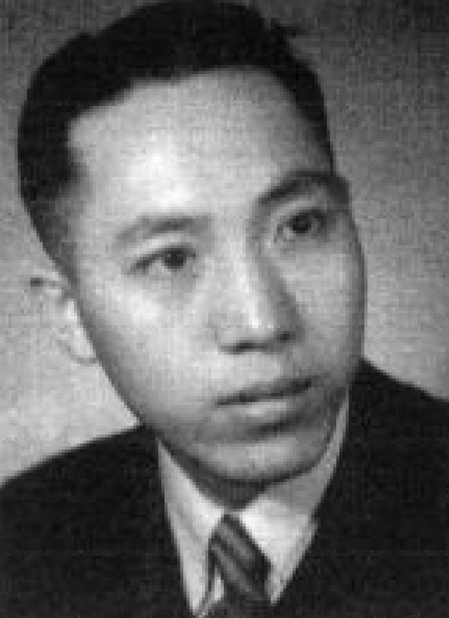
- Born: 31 August 1922; Minqing County, Fuzhou, Republic of China
- Died: 22 May 2021 (aged 98); Shanghai, People's Republic of China
- Education: Tongji University
- Medical career
- Profession: Surgeon
- Institutions: Eastern Hepatobiliary Surgery Hospital, Second Military Medical University
- Sub-specialties: Hepatobiliary surgery
- Awards: State Preeminent Science and Technology Award

Dr. Wu Mengchao (Chinese: 吴孟超; 31 August 1922 – 22 May 2021) was a Chinese surgeon and a medical scientist who specialized in hepatobiliary surgery. He was also known as the "Father of Chinese Hepatobiliary Surgery".

Wu was born in Minqing County, Fuzhou, China. In 1940, he was admitted to 同济附中 (tong ji fu zhong), a high school affiliated to Tongji University. In 1949, he graduated from Tongji University School of Medicine in Shanghai. He was elected to the Chinese Academy of Sciences in 1991 and was awarded the State Preeminent Science and Technology Award in 2005, China's highest scientific prize, by President Hu Jintao. He was the founding director of Eastern Hepatobiliary Surgery Hospital affiliated to the Second Military Medical University in Shanghai. On 1 January 2019, Wu retired.

Wu proposed the new perspectives on liver anatomy, invented the a new operation of intermittent interruption of the Porta Hepatis at room temperature, and established the complete hepatobiliary diagnostic system and several hepatobiliary specialist hospitals in China.

At 13:02 on 22 May 2021, Wu Mengchao died in Shanghai at the age of 99.

The minor planet 17606 Wumengchao was named after him.

== Early life and education ==
Wu was born into a small mountain village family in Minqing County, Fujian. At age of five, he and his mother moved to Malaysia to live with his father. When he was eight years old, he started to study at an overseas Chinese school while helping his father at his job cutting rubber from the trees.

In 1940, Wu returned to China for participating in anti-Japanese activities during the Second World War. But he was unable to go to the frontline, so he enrolled in High School Affiliated to Tongji University and determined to "study to save the country" by treating wounded soldiers and raising funds. In 1943, he was admitted to the Tongji University School of Medicine in Shanghai and graduated in 1949.

== Career ==
After graduation, he was assigned to be a pediatrician at the university, but his dream of becoming a surgeon led him to turn the offer down and look for opportunities elsewhere. In 1949, he joined The First Affiliated Hospital (Changhai Hospital) of People's Medical College of East China Military Region (Second Military Medical University now), and became a military surgeon. In the hospital, he was inspired by Doctor Qiu Fazu.

In 1958, Wu wanted to find a theoretical breakthrough, and there were no books on hepatic surgery in Chinese. So he translated and published an English edition of Introduction to Hepatic Surgery by Henry Gans. This is the first book on hepatic surgery that laid the theoretical foundation for developing liver surgery in China.

In the same year, Wu worked with other two surgeons as a research group seeking breakthroughs in hepatic surgery. He figured out to use ping pong balls as infusion material to make the first human liver vascular model in China after repeatedly testing more than 20 kinds of infusion materials to no avail. The success of this specimen played a decisive role in helping to understand the distribution of vessels and the direction of blood flow in the liver.

After that, Wu led the group to produce many cast modelings of the liver. After observation, research, and 200 cases of clinical exploration, Wu understood the deconstructed structure of the human liver. In 1960, a creative view of five lobes and four segments of liver anatomy was proposed by him tailoring to Chinese people.

In 1960, he performed the first successful liver surgery ever in Changhai Hospital, successfully removing liver cancer from a female patient.

In 1963, he managed to operate on the middle lobe of the liver that is at the "heart" of the liver and is surrounded by numerous blood vessels, often called forbidden zone in hepatic surgery. This is the first successful lobectomy of the middle liver in the world.

In 1975, he removed the largest hepatic cavernous hemangioma ever removed in China and abroad, weighing 18 kg, in a single incision.

Wu's achievements gradually went overseas. In September, 1979, Wu was invited to deliver a report at the 28th International Society of Surgery Congress in San Francisco. Wu reported 181 cases of primary liver cancer treated by surgical resection from January 1960 to December 1977 with a low mortality rate of only 8.8%, which shocked the participating experts. At the meeting, Wu Mengchao was inducted as a member of the International Surgical Society, as a recognition of the international medical community for liver surgery in China.

In 1993, Shanghai East Hepatobiliary Surgery Hospital was established led by Wu after 37 years of development, starting with the three-member hepatobiliary surgery team in 1956.

In 1996, Wu Mengchao established the "Wu Mengchao Medical Foundation for Hepatobiliary Surgery", the first special fund in the field of liver surgery in China. At present, it has developed into the "Shanghai Wu Mengchao Medical Science and Technology Foundation". It currently has fund of 15 million RMB.

On 9 January 2006, Wu Mengchao received China Awards for Science and Technology, the highest national award for scientists. He is the first doctor who won this prize. And he used all of the 6 million RMB awarded by the state.

In 2018, he went on a reality show called the Readers in China. He was 96 years old at that time but still performed three surgeries a week. And his fingers were permanently deformed due to those hours spending in operation rooms.

On 14 January 2019, Wu Mengchao retired at the age of 97.

== Legacy ==
=== Creating the First Complete Hepatic Vascular Model in China ===
In 1958, Wu led a research team of three, with Zhang Xiaohua and Hu Hongkai being group members. They set their aim at improving the situation of liver surgeries in China. And the first problem they had to tackle was to create models of human livers. The team had spent over 120 days and tried more than 20 materials before they finally succeeded.

Wu was inspired by the news of Rong Guotuan winning a table tennis championship and thought about using the same material as a pingpong ball to create models. They cut pingpong balls into pieces and dissolved the pieces in nitric acid solution. Then they injected the new solution into blood vessels and eroded the surface of the liver with hydrochloric acid. Then they carved bit by bit and got the first injection cast model of a liver made in China.

=== Proposal of the "Five-lobe and Four-segment" Theory ===
In 1960, Wu proposed the "Five-lobe and Four-segment" theory for the first time. This is a theory he developed after carefully studying almost 200 specimen of human livers from patients of different age, sex and health conditions. By this time, he had figured out the layout of hepatic artery, hepatic vein, portal vein and bile duct in livers. He also had a grasp of the anatomy of a healthy liver.

He suggested that the traditional theory that separates human livers into only left and right lobes needed to be updated, and established a new anatomical theory based on vascular distributions in livers and intrahepatic fissure. Guided by this new way of thinking, he proposed the "Five-lobe and Four-segment" theory in 1960 for the first time and published Observation on Intrahepatic Anatomy of Normal People in China (《我国正常人肝内解剖的观察》), Anatomical Observation of Normal Human Intrahepatic Bile Duct and Hepatic Artery(《正常人肝内胆管和肝动脉的解剖学观察》) etc., and constructed a brand new theory of human liver anatomy. This is the first time for a Chinese scholar to propose an explicit explanation of "Five-lobe and Four-segment" theory in the international community of academia.

The "Five-lobe and Four-segment" theory boldly suggests dividing a human liver into five lobes, which are left outer lobe, left inner lobe, right anterior lobe, right posterior lobe and caudate lobe. And the left outer lobe and right anterior lobe are both further subdivided into two segments, which are upper and lower segments, in total four segments.

This very theory was what guided the first liver surgery Wu conducted in March 1960. In June 1960, the research team of three represented by Wu reported the new theory on the seventh meeting of Chinese Medical Association held in Zhengzhou, and was recognized by the end of the conference as a major breakthrough in liver anatomy theory in China and also an innovation of great value in clinical treatments.

After more than 60 years of practice, the theory has proven itself as the foundation of liver surgeries and has long been guiding all kinds of liver surgeries in the world. It has also served as a guide to later innovations in liver surgeries such as hepatectomy, local radical resection of liver cancer, and radical treatment of liver cancer. This theory has also been included in textbooks of Chinese medical schools and other classic works, and has been widely studied and incorporated.

=== Inventing a new Technique that avoids Excessive Blood Loss during Surgeries at Room Temperature ===
In the two years after finishing his first liver cancer resection surgery, Wu did about a dozen liver cancer surgeries, but the bleeding problem remained. The most prevalent solution to preventing ischemia reperfusion injury in liver surgeries was low temperature anesthesia. A major flaw to this method is that patients suffer from hypothermia.

Wu was inspired by water taps and thought about installing something similar to a valve on liver arteries and portal veins of patients to solve this problem. He then proposed intermittent interruption of the Porta Hepatis at room temperature. After careful comparison experiments, it was found that occluding for 15 minutes and releasing for 5 minutes is the most ideal interval.

This technique effectively lowered the risk of acute liver failure in patients after the surgery, reduced the occurrence of ischemia reperfusion injury and greatly improved safety and success rate of the surgeries. This technique is crucial to the successes of many complicated liver cancer surgeries that were done afterwards. It has been widely incorporated in liver surgeries not only in China but also in the world.

== Research contributions ==
There is a collection of Wu's works that are accessible online provided by Scholia.
