= Eastern Hepatobiliary Surgery Hospital =

Hospital in Shanghai, China

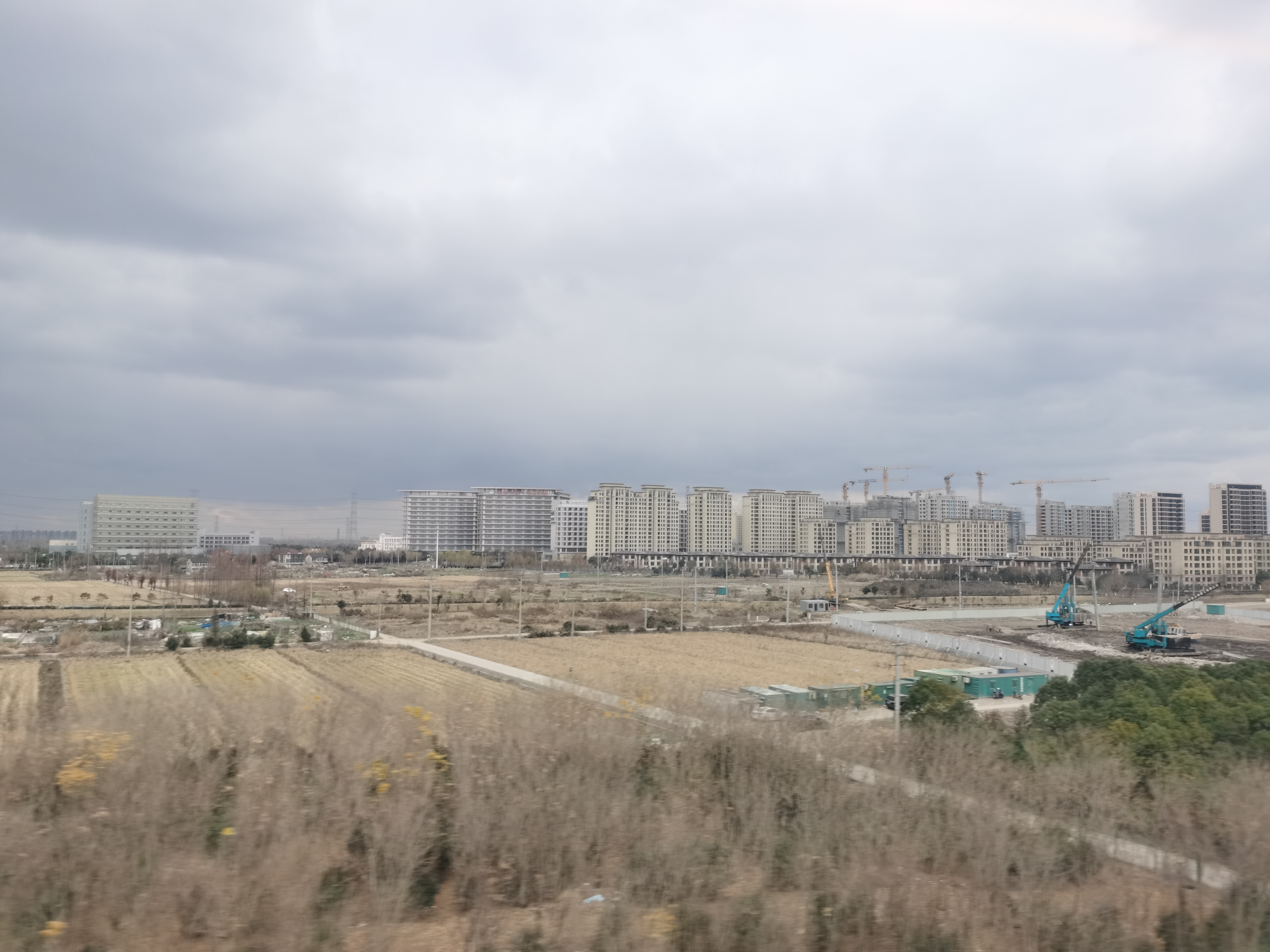
Eastern Hepatobiliary Surgery Hospital, Jiading Branch (December 2021)

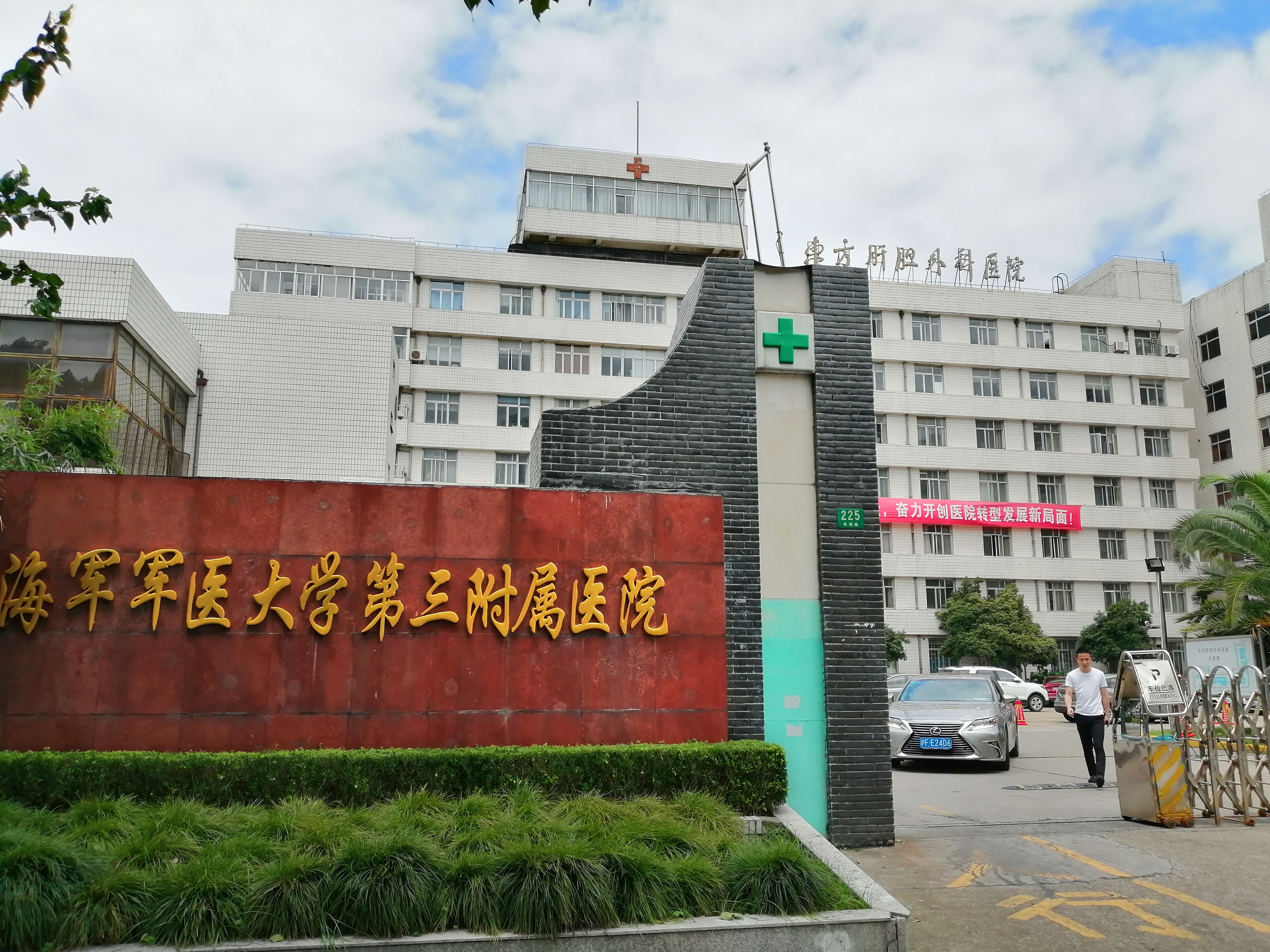
Eastern Hepatobiliary Surgery Hospital, Yangpu Branch

The Eastern Hepatobiliary Surgery Hospital is the Third Affiliated Hospital of Naval Medical University. It is a Grade III Class A comprehensive hospital in Shanghai. The hospital was founded and led by Wu Mengchao, the "Father of Chinese Hepatobiliary Surgery", integrating medical treatment, education and research.

In the 2026 China Hospital and Specialty Reputation Ranking, Eastern Hepatobiliary Surgery Hospital ranked 1st in Hepatobiliary Surgery nationally.

== History ==
In 1958, Wu Mengchao, Zhang Xiaohua, and Hu Hongkai formed the Hepatobiliary Surgery Research Group of Changhai Hospital

In 1963, Wu Mengchao successfully completed the world's first middle hepatic lobectomy.

In 1978, Wu Mengchao applied to Changhai Hospital to establish the first hepatobiliary surgery department in the People's Republic of China, and was approved.

In 1993, the hepatobiliary surgery department was upgraded to the "Eastern Hepatobiliary Surgery Hospital of Changhai Hospital.

In May 1993, Jiang Zemin, General Secretary of the CPC Central Committee, President of the State and Chairman of the Central Military Commission, inscribed the name of the hospital and institute, "Oriental Hepatobiliary Surgery Hospital and Institute".

In September 1996, the Third Affiliated Hospital of the Second Military Medical University of the Chinese People's Liberation Army (Oriental Hepatobiliary Surgery Hospital and Oriental Hepatobiliary Surgery Institute) was established. It is the largest hepatobiliary surgery hospital and institute in the People's Republic of China. It is also the first specialized hepatobiliary surgery hospital in the country.

In December 1996, the hospital was approved by the General Logistics Department of the Chinese People's Liberation Army as a "Grade A Tertiary" specialized hospital. Subsequently, the hospital developed into a Grade A Tertiary Comprehensive Hospital specializing in hepatobiliary surgery.

In 2015, the Jiading branch in Anting was opened. The National Liver Cancer Research Center, located adjacent to the hospital, is a national-level liver cancer research center established under the leadership of Academicians Wu Mengchao and Wang Hongyang, based at the new Anting branch.

A paper presented at the 2019 Chinese Society of Clinical Oncology Annual Meeting indicated that a PreCar project has achieved significant success. This project was jointly developed by RuiGene Technology, the National Liver Cancer Research Center, and Shanghai Oriental Hepatobiliary Surgery Hospital. Through gene detection, liver cancer can be detected at a very early and small stage, which is 6-12 months earlier than the traditional method and can significantly improve the 5-year survival rate by up to four times.

== Other information ==
Eastern Hepatobiliary Surgery Hospital has two campuses or branches: the Jiading Branch and Yanpu Branch.

The hospital has a floor area of 200,000 square meters, with over 1,500 patient beds. It serves more than 600,000 outpatients and 15,000 surgeries annually, in both Chinese and English languages.

The hospital is currently a national key discipline and a key laboratory of the Ministry of Education and the entire military in China.

In scientific research, Eastern Hepatobiliary Surgery Hospital published 31 papers listed in Nature Index for the time frame of 1 July 2025 - 30 June 2026, ranking 431st globally and 171st in China in healthcare.

In the 2026 China Hospital and Specialty Reputation Ranking, Eastern Hepatobiliary Surgery Hospital ranked 1st in Hepatobiliary Surgery nationally.

== Wu Mengchao ==
Dr. Wu Mengchao (Chinese: 吴孟超; 31 August 1922 – 22 May 2021) was a Chinese surgeon and a medical scientist in hepatobiliary surgery. He was also known as the "Father of Chinese Hepatobiliary Surgery".

In 1975, Wu Mengchao successfully removed the world's largest hepatic cavernous hemangioma to date, weighing 18 kilograms.

Wu became an academician of the Chinese Academy of Sciences in 1991 and was awarded the State Preeminent Science and Technology Award in 2005, China's highest scientific prize, by President Hu Jintao. He was the founding director of Eastern Hepatobiliary Surgery Hospital.

Wu proposed the new perspectives on liver anatomy, invented a new operation of intermittent interruption of the Porta Hepatis at room temperature, and established the complete hepatobiliary diagnostic system and several hepatobiliary specialist hospitals in China.

The minor planet 17606 Wumengchao was named after him.

== See also ==
- Naval Medical University
- Wu Mengchao
- List of hospitals in China
