= HPB =

HPB may refer to:

- Half Price Books, an American book retailer
- Harvard Papers in Botany, a scientific journal
- Health Promotion Board, a statutory board in Singapore for health promotion and disease prevention
- Helena Petrovna Blavatsky (1831–1891), theosophist, writer and traveler
- Hooper Bay Airport, in Alaska, United States (by IATA and FAA LID code)
- Hrvatska poštanska banka, largest Croatian-owned bank
- HPB (journal), journal of the International Hepato-Pancreato-Biliary Association
- Hexaphenylbenzene
