= James Toouli =

Australian surgeon and academic (born 1945)

James Toouli AM FRACS
- Toouli in 2026
- Born: 1945 (age 80–81); Limassol, British Cyprus
- Occupations: Academic; surgeon
- Spouse: Helen
- Children: 2

Academic background
- Education: Monash University (MBBS; PhD)

Academic work
- Discipline: Medicine
- Institutions: University of Glasgow; Flinders University

James Toouli (born 1945) is an Australian surgeon and academic who specialises in hepato-pancreato-biliary surgery and gastroenterology.

Toouli is from Limassol, British Cyprus, where he was born, and he immigrated to Australia together with his sister and his parents while still at the age of nine. Toouli earned his degrees from Monash University in 1970. His earned degrees include Bachelor of Medicine, Bachelor of Surgery with Honours. Toouli worked for The Alfred Hospital in Melbourne but left for Adelaide, where he got into Flinders Medical Centre. From 1978 to 1979, he worked with Leslie Blumgart in Glasgow, during which time he developed an interest in endoscopic retrograde cholangiopancreatography (ERCP).

Toouli started his career in 1982 as a lecturer in surgery at Flinders University, advancing to become the professor of surgery in 1989 up to 2011. Some of the areas that he practiced in terms of clinical work and research were ERCP, sphincter of Oddi, pancreatitis, and pancreatic cancer. Some of the specialties that Toouli contributed to developing in South Australia included hepato-pancreato-biliary surgery and liver transplant programs. Toouli was later involved in medical societies such as the Gastroenterological Society of Australia, Royal Australasian College of Surgeons, International Hepato-Pancreato-Biliary Association, and the World Gastroenterology Organisation.

== Early life and education ==
Toouli was born in 1945 in Limassol, then in British Cyprus. He, at the age of nine, emigrated to Australia with his parents and sister. Later, Toouli studied at Monash University, and graduated with a Bachelor of Medicine, Bachelor of Surgery (Hons) in 1970.

== Medical career ==
After graduating, Toouli joined The Alfred Hospital in Melbourne. His approach to surgery was influenced by the surgeon Hugh Dudley at Monash. He subsequently followed surgeon Jim Watts to the Flinders Medical Centre in Adelaide, where he became the first trainee registrar in surgery. He was a member of the resident medical staff when Flinders Medical Centre opened in 1976.

From 1978 to 1979, Toouli worked with Leslie Blumgart in Glasgow, where he developed an interest in endoscopic retrograde cholangiopancreatography (ERCP). He completed a PhD at his alma mater in 1979 on the treatment of cholesterol gallstones. From 1979 to 1981, he held a National Health and Medical Research Council (NHMRC) fellowship researching biliary tract and pancreatic motility.

Hepato-pancreato-biliary surgery was introduced by Toouli as a speciality at Flinders Medical Centre upon his return to Adelaide. Afterwards, he became a lecturer in surgery in 1982 and was later promoted to a senior lecturer in the following year. Toouli served as the head of gastrointestinal surgery in the 1980s. During that same period, he was involved with the International Biliary Association. He chaired its programme committee from 1989 to 1992. Toouli was also involved in the development of subspecialty units within general surgery. Additionally, at Flinders Medical Centre, he introduced ERCP and endoscopic interventional techniques, including sphincterotomy and biliary stenting. Toouli was involved in the development of the South Australian Liver Transplant Unit.

From 1986 to 1992, Toouli chaired the Year 5 Clinical Committee at Flinders University. He was appointed professor of surgery in 1989, a position he held until 2011. Subsequently, Toouli's research included the sphincter of Oddi, pancreatitis and pancreatic cancer. He supervised higher-degree research students in surgery, including 40 PhD candidates.

Toouli became the founding Professor of Surgical Sciences of the Royal Australasian College of Surgeons (RACS) in 1995, a post he occupied until 2001. In the early 1990s, Toouli was a part of the team developing the Objective Structured Clinical Assessment testing tool and the Critical Learning Evaluation and Research (CLEAR) Workshop. In 1994, Toouli received the John Mitchell Crouch Fellowship.

Toouli was elected to the Gastroenterological Society of Australia (GESA) Council in 1991. He then became its president in 1995. Toouli also co-founded the Conjoint Committee for the Recognition of Training in Endoscopy. In 1998, he was elected to the executive of the Organisation Mondiale de Gastro-Entérologie (OMGE), and chaired its education committee. At OMGE, Toouli was a part of their "Train the Trainers" programme and its training centres. He later chaired the World Gastroenterology Organisation (WGO) Core Education and Training Committee from 2000 to 2012.

== Later career ==
Toouli became involved with the International Hepato-Pancreato-Biliary Association (IHPBA) in the 1980s and served as its inaugural Secretary-General from 1996 to 1999. He prepared the association's bid manual for countries seeking to host its world congress and served as congress chairman for the 2000 IHPBA World Congress in Brisbane. In 2000, Toouli was elected the fourth president of the IHPBA, serving from 2000 to 2002. During his presidency, the association was incorporated as a United States company in Wisconsin in 2001. He established its Executive Secretariat and first website. Toouli also oversaw the Fifth IHPBA World Congress, held in Tokyo in 2002. He also established the Warren Fellowship.

Toouli was one of the founding members of Asian-Pacific Hepato-Pancreato-Biliary Association (A-PHPBA) and also its chairman between 2007 and 2009. He was the president of Australasian Pancreatic Club between 2010 and 2012 and he was one of the founding members of that organisation. Toouli was the editor-in-chief of HPB, the journal of IHPBA between 2004 and 2008. He had edited several books and wrote research papers and book chapters on surgery and gastroenterology.

Toouli was Director of the Adelaide Bariatric Centre from 2002 to 2012. In 2012, he was appointed emeritus professor at Flinders University. From 2013 to 2014, he served as president of WGO. He served on the NHMRC Monitoring and Safety Reporting Position Statement Revision Working Committee from 2015 to 2017 and had previously chaired an NHMRC discipline panel in 2000. He has also served as an examiner for the Australian Medical Council since 1996 and as chairman of Committee B of the Bellberry Human Research Ethics Committee in Adelaide. Toouli was appointed an associate professor by the French Ministry of Health at the University of Nice in 1994, where he contributed clinical research and the publication of research findings in English.

== Honours and awards ==
Toouli was awarded Fellow of the Royal Australasian College of Surgeons (FRACS) in 1977. He has been bestowed the WGO's 2019 Biennial Master Award. Following that, he received the Distinguished Service Medal from A-PHPBA in 2015. In appreciation of his service to the field of gastroenterology, he was appointed a Member of the Order of Australia (AM) in the 2021 Queen's Birthday Honours. Toouli received the Sir Henry Newland Award of RACS' State Committee of South Australia in 2024.

== Personal life ==
Toouli is married to Helen. Together they have two children and lived in the Adelaide Hills.

== Selected publications ==
By 2001, Toouli has authored five books, 66 book chapters and about 150 refereed journal articles.

- Toouli, J.; Roberts-Thomson, I. C.; Dent, J.; et al. (1985). "Sphincter of Oddi motility disorders in patients with idiopathic recurrent pancreatitis". British Journal of Surgery. 72 (11): 859–863. doi:10.1002/bjs.1800721104. PMID 4063750.
- Toouli, J.; Roberts-Thomson, I. C.; Dent, J.; et al. (May 1985). "Manometric disorders in patients with suspected sphincter of Oddi dysfunction". Gastroenterology. 88 (5): 1243–1250. doi:10.1016/S0016-5085(85)80086-X. PMID 3979750.
- Toouli, James (1 June 1995). "Peroperative Endoscopic Sphincterotomy". Surgical Innovation. 2 (2): 128–130. doi:10.1177/155335069500200208. PMID 10401073.
- Toouli, J.; Di Francesco, V.; Saccone, G.; Kollias, J.; Schloithe, A.; Shanks, N. (September 1996). "Division of the sphincter of Oddi for treatment of dysfunction associated with recurrent pancreatitis". British Journal of Surgery. 83 (9): 1205–1210. doi:10.1046/j.1365-2168.1996.02467.x. PMID 8983606.
- Toouli, J.; Roberts-Thomson, I. C.; Kellow, J.; et al. (January 2000). "Manometry based randomised trial of endoscopic sphincterotomy for sphincter of Oddi dysfunction". Gut. 46 (1): 98–102. doi:10.1136/gut.46.1.98. PMC 1727795. PMID 10601063.
- Toouli, James; Craig, Alexander (May 2000). "Sphincter of Oddi Function and Dysfunction". Canadian Journal of Gastroenterology. 14 (5): 411–419. doi:10.1155/2000/313601. PMID 10851282.
- Toouli, J.; Brooke-Smith, M.; Bassi, C.; et al. (February 2002). "Guidelines for the management of acute pancreatitis". Journal of Gastroenterology and Hepatology. 17 (S1): S15–S39. doi:10.1046/j.1440-1746.17.s1.2.x. PMID 12000591.
- Toouli, James (1 October 2009). "Sphincter of Oddi: Function, dysfunction, and its management". Journal of Gastroenterology and Hepatology. 24 (S3): S57–S62. doi:10.1111/j.1440-1746.2009.06072.x. PMID 19799700.
- Pitt, Henry A.; Williamson, Robin C. N.; Toouli, James; Gouma, Dirk J.; Windsor, John A. (27 March 2012). International Hepato-Pancreato-Biliary Association (PDF) (Report). International Hepato-Pancreato-Biliary Association. pp. 1–46. Archived from the original (PDF) on 24 June 2017.
- Ikramuddin, Sayeed; Blackstone, Robin P.; Brancatisano, Anthony; Toouli, James; et al. (3 September 2014). "Effect of Reversible Intermittent Intra-abdominal Vagal Nerve Blockade on Morbid Obesity: The ReCharge Randomized Clinical Trial". JAMA. 312 (9): 915–922. doi:10.1001/jama.2014.10540. PMID 25182100.
- Barreto, Savio George; Toouli, James (2018). "7". In Beger, Hans G.; Warshaw, Andrew L.; Hruban, Ralph H.; et al. (eds.). The Pancreas: An Integrated Textbook of Basic Science, Medicine, and Surgery (3rd ed.). John Wiley & Sons. pp. 75–83. doi:10.1002/9781119188421.ch7. ISBN 9781119188391.
- Kow, Lilian; Sharaiha, Reem Z.; O'Kane, Mary; White, Kevin P.; Macedo, Guilherme; Toouli, Jim; et al. (November 2023). "Methodology and Results of a Joint IFSO-WGO Delphi Survey of 94 Intercontinental, Interdisciplinary Experts in Obesity Management". Obesity Surgery. 33 (11): 3337–3352. doi:10.1007/s11695-023-06757-2. PMC 10602939. PMID 37831326.
- Sharaiha, Reem Z.; Shikora, Scott; White, Kevin P.; Macedo, Guilherme; Toouli, Jim; et al. (November–December 2023). "Summarizing Consensus Guidelines on Obesity Management: A Joint, Multidisciplinary Venture of the International Federation for the Surgery of Obesity & Metabolic Disorders (IFSO) and World Gastroenterology Organisation (WGO)". Journal of Clinical Gastroenterology. 57 (10): 967–976. doi:10.1097/MCG.0000000000001916. PMC 10566600. PMID 37831466.
