= Changhai Hospital =

Hospital in Shanghai, China

Changhai Hospital (Chinese: 長海醫院)
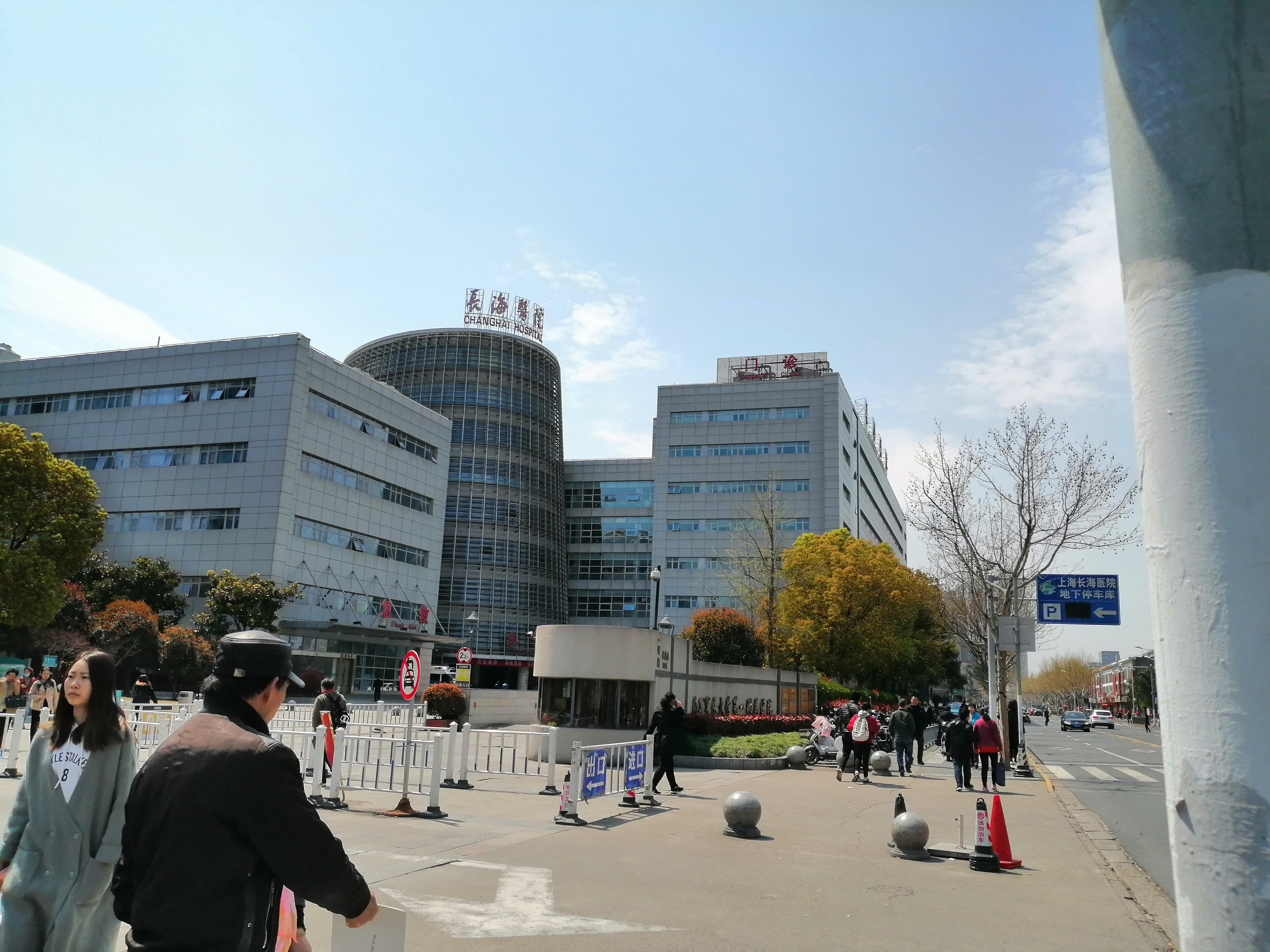
- Changhai Hospital Outpatient Building

Geography
- Location: No. 168 Changhai Road, Yangpu District, Shanghai, China

Organisation
- Type: military, general, teaching
- Affiliated university: Naval Medical University

Services
- Standards: 3A hospital
- Emergency department: Yes
- Beds: 2,100+

History
- Founded: 1949

Links
- Website: www.chhospital.com.cn

Changhai Hospital, or "Shanghai Changhai Hospital", is the First Affiliated Hospital of the Naval Medical University of the Chinese People's Liberation Army, that is responsible for medical treatment, teaching and scientific research. It is a large general Grade A tertiary hospital which is known for its treatment of burn and war trauma, digestive and urinary system diseases, and integrated traditional Chinese and Western medicine treatment of tumors. The hospital is located in Yangpu District, Shanghai, China.

== History ==
In May 1949, the Logistics and Health Department of the East China Military Region and the Third Field Army of the Chinese Communist Party took over the Second General Hospital of the Joint Logistics Department of the Kuomintang in Shanghai and had it reorganized into the "Affiliated Hospital of the People's Medical College of the East China Military Region".

In November 1950, with the renaming of the medical college, the hospital was renamed the "Affiliated Hospital of Shanghai Military Medical University". In July 1951, the hospital was renamed the "Affiliated Hospital of the Second Military Medical University". In 1954, the hospital began to accept local patients, in addition to the military personnels and their families. In September 1958, with the establishment of a new hospital for the medical university, the original hospital was renamed the "The First Affiliated Hospital of the Second Military Medical University". From 1962, the hospital has been officially called "Changhai Hospital" by the outside world.

In September 1969, after the outbreak of the Cultural Revolution, the Changhai Hospital was transferred to Xi'an, Shaanxi Province with the Second Military Medical University.

In August 1975, the hospital moved back to Shanghai.

In 1989, the hepatobiliary surgery department was designated as a national key discipline. In 1993, Changhai Hospital was listed among the first batch of Grade A tertiary hospitals in China. In 1996, the Infectious Diseases Building was completed and put into use. In 1999, Changhai was awarded the title of "Top 100 Hospitals in China".

In 2004, the Cardiothoracic Diseases Diagnosis and Treatment Center Building was officially put into use. In 2006, Changhai was awarded the title of "Excellent Hospital of the Entire Army" of China. In December 2015, the hospital was transferred to the leadership of the Training and Management Department of the Central Military Commission of China. In 2017, due to the merger of the Second Military Medical University and the Naval Medical Research Institute, the hospital was renamed the "First Affiliated Hospital of the Naval Medical University of the Chinese People's Liberation Army", maintaining the alternative name of "Changhai Hospital".

In November 2025, the Cell Therapy Center of Changhai Hospital was officially inaugurated. At the same time, the hospital's clinical research results on CAR-NK cell therapy for systemic lupus erythematosus (SLE) were published in The Lancet.

== Contemporary facilities ==
Changhai is a large general Grade A tertiary hospital responsible for medical treatment, teaching and scientific research integrated. The main campus and the Xinjiangwan City Health Examination Center cover an area of 145,800 square meters, with over 2,100 beds and an annual outpatient and emergency volume of 3.6 million visits. It also trains more than 18,000 people annually. The hospital has two academicians of the Chinese Academy of Engineering.

The hospital is strong at the treatment of burn and war trauma, digestive and urinary system diseases, cardiovascular and cerebrovascular diseases and major vascular surgeries, whole organ and hematopoietic stem cell transplantation, and integrated traditional Chinese and Western medicine treatment of tumors.

Changhai Hospital has published more than 500 SCI papers, with its clinical medicine ranking among the top 0.1% globally in ESI. There are 51 papers listed in Nature Index for the Time frame of 1 January 2025 - 31 December 2025, ranking 185th globally and 75th in China in healthcare.

Changhai has founded several academic journals, including JIG, Chinese Journal of Pancreatology (Chinese: 中华胰腺病杂志), Journal of Integrated Traditional and Western Medicine (Chinese: 中西医结合学报), and Pharmaceutical Services and Research (Chinese: 药学服务与研究).

Hospital Address: No. 168 Changhai Road, Yangpu District, Shanghai.

== Historical buildings ==
Shanghai Municipal Museum: The imaging building of Changhai Hospital was originally the Shanghai Municipal Museum, which was part of the Greater Shanghai Plan. Construction of the museum began in September 1934 and was completed in July 1935. Currently, this building is among the second batch of outstanding modern protected buildings in Shanghai.

China Aviation Association Building: The History Exhibition Hall of the Second Military Medical University of the Chinese People's Liberation Army, located within Changhai Hospital, was originally the China Aviation Association Building (Aircraft Building), and was also part of the Greater Shanghai Plan. Currently, this building is among the fourth batch of outstanding historical buildings in Shanghai.

== See also ==
- Naval Medical University
- Xijing Hospital
- Southwest Hospital of AMU
- List of hospitals in China
