= Wang Aiping (physician) =

Chinese pharmacologist and toxicologist

Wang Aiping (born February 1958 in Baiquan County, Heilongjiang Province, China) is a Chinese pharmacologist and toxicologist. For over 20 years, Wang has researched drug and toxicity testing and has experience in new drug development. Since 2001, he has been Director of Drug Safety Evaluation and Research at the Academy of Medical Sciences, Peking Union Medical College and was also made General Manager of Technological development at Peking Union Medical College's Jianhao Pharmaceutical Technology Development Co., Ltd.

He has published papers, while also being responsible for four successful international patent applications. He has developed test methods, several of which are included in Pharmacology Research Methodology (People's Health Press, 2nd Edition, edited by Che Qi).

== Education ==
In 1980, he graduated from the Medical Department of the Third Military Medical University. From 1981 to 1982, he studied at the Southwest China Normal University Department of Biology Education. In 1983, he completed a teacher training course in Genetics, at the Fudan University. In 1984 he attended the Fourth Military Medical University teaching workshops about Cell Biology. In 1988 he received a Master of Science, from Hangzhou University.

== Research work ==
In 1989, he was appointed Assistant Professor at the Military Medical Academy's Institute of Pharmacology and Toxicology, as a Research Associate Institute of Pharmacology Toxicology, The Academy of Military Medical Sciences (AMMS). In 1995, he went to the University of Illinois, Chicago School of Medicine Department of Pharmacology, as Toxicology studies visiting scholar. In 1996, he was Deputy Director of the laboratory at the National Center of Biomedical Analysis of Carcinogenesis, Teratogenesis & Mutagenesis and Deputy Director of the Military Medical Sciences, Institute of Pharmacology and Toxicology, Toxicology Department. From 2001 to date he was appointed Director and researcher of Drug Safety Evaluation and Research, at the Academy of Medical Sciences, Peking Union Medical College, Beijing.

== Current positions held ==
He is the Associate Director of the National Technical Committee for the Biological Testing Standardization of Medical Devices; Director of the China Environmental Mutagen Society; Director of the Teratogenetics Specialist Committee; Associate Director of the Genetoxicity Specialist Committee; Director of the Chinese Society of Toxicology; Executive Director of the Beijing Environmental Mutagen Society; specialist for the Committee of the Scientific Research Foundation for Returned Overseas Chinese Scholars; specialist for the State Education Ministry; and member of the SFDA Specialist Database.

He also serves as the Committee Chairman of the Chinese Environmental Mutagen Society of birth defects prevention; Vice-chairman of the Chinese Society of Toxicology, for the Committee of Reproductive Toxicology; Executive Director of the Beijing Municipal Environmental Mutagen Society; SFDA GLP inspection expert; Member of experts for Drug Evaluation; SFDA expert review of the library members medicines and SFDA expert reviewer of medical devices library members.

He was a former member of the Military Drug Evaluation Specialist Database, and former member of the Specialist Committee of the Medical Science Committee of General Logistics Department of the PLA.

== Publications ==
He is an editor of Carcinogenesis, Teratogenesis and Mutagenesis; Chinese Journal of Industrial Hygiene and Occupational Diseases; China Pharmacology Communications; Pharmaceutical Technology magazine; and the Distortion of cancer mutations magazine. He is also Vice president of science and technology magazine Trends.

Wang has published 123 research papers in Chinese journals at various levels of academic expertise; 106 as the first author, and non-first author of 17.

Internationally, he has published 6 papers in various co-authorships with various combinations of Toxicologists Hongtao Jin, Zibo Zhang, Zhiqiao Wang, Jinfeng Wei, Qinglin Zhang, Chunqian Huang, Fang Fang, Wei Liu, Yan Liu.

His articles have appeared in Biological Evaluation of Medical Devices Implementation Guide, pre-clinical safety evaluation of new drugs and Practice, drug pharmacology and Pharmacology Research Methodology, and Contemporary pharmacology.

== International standardization ==
In the early 1990s, he began to engage in the area of substance non-clinical safety evaluation of quality management practices (GLP). In 2001 he was appointed Director of Drug Safety Evaluation and Research at the Chinese Academy of Medical Sciences, Peking Union Medical College, and has since been responsible for the center's overall construction of GLP software and hardware, and presided over the development, and addition to, and modification of more than 500 copies of standard operating procedures (SOP); he is also editor of the Laboratory Management Standard Operating Manual; Quality Assurance Standard Operating Manual;Reproductive Toxicology Testing Standard Operating Manual; Commonly Used Experimental Techniques Standard Operating Manual, Long-Term Toxicity Test Standard Operating Manual; Common Instruments Using Standard Operating Manual; Animal Husbandry Standard Operating Manual; Blood and Biochemical Test Manual; Dermal Toxicity Test Standard Operating Manual; Genetic Toxicology Testing Standard Operating Manual; Pathological Examination Standard Operating Manual; Toxicokinetic Experiments Standard Operating Manual and other 14 kinds of standard operating manuals.

Since 2004, the center passed the ISO9001:2000 Quality Management System Certification, the National Measurement Accreditation and the SFDA's GLP certification.

== Patents and awards ==
He has successfully entered 13 Chinese national patent applications and has been registered with 4 successful joint international patent applications.

As the first signature on the "Section of reproductive toxicity in mice III set up in the application of experimental methods of research", he won the Army and Technology Progress Award (1992).

== Business success ==
Since 2002, the Peking Union Medical College Jianhao Pharmaceutical Technology Development Co., Ltd., made Dr Aiping Wang General Manager. The mission statement of Jianhao Pharmaceutical Technology Development Co., Ltd., is to carry out exploratory and research-focused efforts into novel drug types.

His company won the 2007 Tenth Beijing Golden Bridge Award Project Third Prize for the Technology Market in 2007 and in 2006 was in fourth place as China's most viable enterprise for the project funding in the 'one hundred and seventy-six names' for SMEs by the National Science and Technology Innovation Fund.

For its "Construction and use of drug Toxicokinetics platforms" project in 2007, it won the Xuanwu District, Beijing Science and Technology Awards First Prize; also in 2007 General Manager Aiping Wang moved to the title of top 100 Chinese entrepreneurs; and finally in 2009 he was a winner at the (ninth) China Enterprise Innovation Forum
