= Chengdu Medical College =

Medical college in Chengdu, China

Coordinates: 30.8165°N 104.1974°E

- 成都医学院
- Motto: 博学博爱、精益求精
- Type: Public
- Established: 1947
- Location: Chengdu, Sichuan, China
- Campus: Tianhui campus and Xindu campus
- Website: http://www.cmc.edu.cn

Chengdu Medical College (Chinese: 成都医学院; traditional Chinese: 成都醫學院)is a public medical school in Chengdu, China. It occupies two campuses, Tianhui and Xindu, covering a total area of 1500 acres, with more than 13,500 full-time students and 914 full-time teachers (480 professors). It offers full-time education from undergraduate to master's degree level.

It is a medical school run by the Sichuan Provincial Government, located in Chengdu, the capital of Sichuan Province, one of the major cities in China. The school was selected as one of the first batch of "Excellent Doctor Education and Training Program" and the "100 Schools Project" of China by the Ministry of Education.

== History ==
The college was established in 1947, during the Chinese Civil War.

- Chengdu Medical College(2004-)
- In August 2004, according to the decision of the State Council and the Central Military Commission, the school was transferred to the Sichuan Provincial People's Government as a whole
- Chengdu Medical College of Third Military Medical University (1999 - 2004)
- Chengdu Medical College of People's Liberation Army (1993 - 1999)
- Chengdu Military Medical School (1974 - 1993)

== Basic information ==
The school covers an area of more than 1,500 acres, and currently has more than 13,500 full-time masters and undergraduate students. It recruits students from 27 provinces (municipalities and autonomous regions) across the country, with 25 undergraduate and 3 junior majors.

It has been selected in the Ministry of Education's "Double Ten Thousand Plan". It has two national-level first-class undergraduate major (clinical medicine, medical laboratory technology), 9 first-class undergraduate major in Sichuan Province (clinical medicine, medical laboratory technology, medical imaging, preventive medicine, Pharmacy, nursing, biotechnology, information management and information systems, biopharmaceuticals).

The school has 914 full-time teachers, including 480 with professorship, accounting for 53.1%, and 679 with Ph.D., M.D. and master's degrees, accounting for 74.29%

There are 466 master tutors, 3 part-time doctoral tutors, 2 currently specially-appointed national "Yangtze River Scholars" and "Chinese Academy of Sciences Hundred Talents Program" national-level talents, 2 "New Century Excellent Talents Support Program" of the Ministry of Education, 5 experts enjoying special allowances from the State Council, 50 academic and technical leaders and reserve candidates in Sichuan Province, 4 outstanding experts in Sichuan Province with outstanding contributions, 5 people in the "Thousand Talents Program" of Sichuan Province, 4 people in the Tianfu Ten Thousand Talents Program, and academicians of the Sichuan Provincial Health Commission And 42 technical leaders and reserve candidates.

The school has 2 national experimental teaching centers-"Clinical Medicine Experimental Teaching Demonstration Center" and "Medical Virtual Simulation Experimental Teaching Center". 1 Medical Humanities Education Base of Higher Education Institutions of the Ministry of Education, 5 Provincial Experimental Teaching Demonstration Centers, 1 Sichuan Provincial Key Laboratory, 1 Sichuan Provincial Key Research Base of Philosophy and Social Sciences, 1 Sichuan Engineering Laboratory, National Medium There are 3 secondary medical scientific research laboratories and 7 key laboratories of universities in Sichuan Province. In 2013, the school "Sichuan Collaborative Innovation Center for Elderly Care and Elderly Health" became the first batch of collaborative innovation centers in Sichuan Province.

== Academic Research ==
In the past three years, the school has established 35 National Natural Science Foundation projects, 3 National Social Science Foundation projects, 88 provincial and ministerial-level projects, and 245 department-level projects. The funding for projects has reached 32.98 million yuan(5 million dollars), and 56 authorized patents have been obtained.

Published more than 900 scientific and technological academic papers. "Journal of Chengdu Medical College" is a core journal of China's science and technology.

The school has built 15 provincial and departmental key scientific research platforms such as the Sichuan Provincial Key Laboratory, the Sichuan Provincial Engineering Laboratory, and the Sichuan Provincial Philosophy and Society Key Research Base, and established 10 provincial and departmental high-level research teams.

Since 2006, 135 projects have been approved by the National Natural Science Foundation of China and the National Social Science Foundation of China.

Teachers' academic papers have been published in top international academic journals such as Cell, and more than a thousand papers have been included in SCI, EI, CPCI-S, etc. 116 academic works have been published and 108 patents have been granted.

"Journal of Chengdu Medical College" won the "2020 Outstanding Science and Technology Journals of Chinese Universities", and was selected as a candidate for the 2020 edition of Peking University's Chinese core journals for comprehensive medical journals

== Undergraduate Majors ==
=== Medicine ===
1. Clinical medicine (five-year undergraduate program, bachelor of medicine)
2. Radiology (five-year undergraduate program, bachelor of medicine)
3. Anesthesiology (five-year undergraduate program, bachelor of medicine)
4. Pediatrics (five-year undergraduate program, bachelor of medicine)
5. Preventive medicine (five-year undergraduate program, bachelor of medicine)
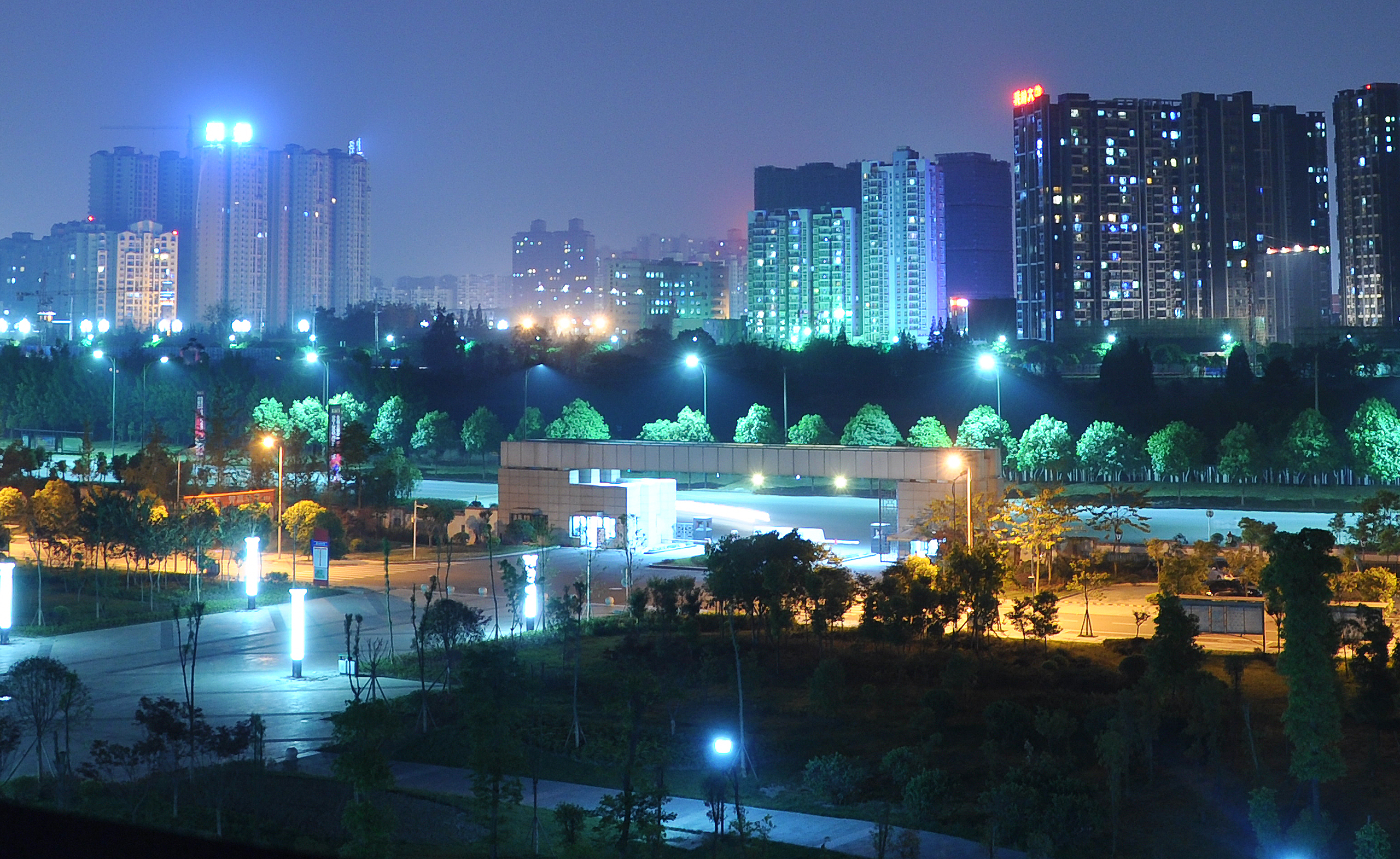
  Night view of the campus

=== Science ===
1. Rehabilitation Therapy (four-year undergraduate program, Bachelor of Science degree)
2. Pharmacy (four-year undergraduate program, Bachelor of Science degree)
3. Pharmaceutical production (four-year undergraduate program, Bachelor of Science degree)
4. Chinese Tradition Pharmacy(four-year undergraduate program, Bachelor of Science degree)
5. Medical laboratory technology (four-year undergraduate program, Bachelor of Science degree)
6. Nursing (four-year undergraduate program, Bachelor of Science degree)
7. Biotechnology (four-year undergraduate program, Bachelor of Science degree)
8. Health inspection and quarantine (four-year undergraduate program, Bachelor of Science degree)
9. Applied Psychology (four-year undergraduate program, Bachelor of Science degree)

=== Engineering ===
1. Food quality and safety (four-year undergraduate program, bachelor's degree in engineering)
2. Biomedical Engineering (four-year undergraduate program, Bachelor of Engineering)
3. Biopharmaceutical (four-year undergraduate program, Bachelor of Engineering)

=== Management ===
1. Public Service Management (four-year undergraduate program, bachelor's degree in management)
2. Health Service and Management (four-year undergraduate program, bachelor's degree in management)

== Postgraduate Education ==
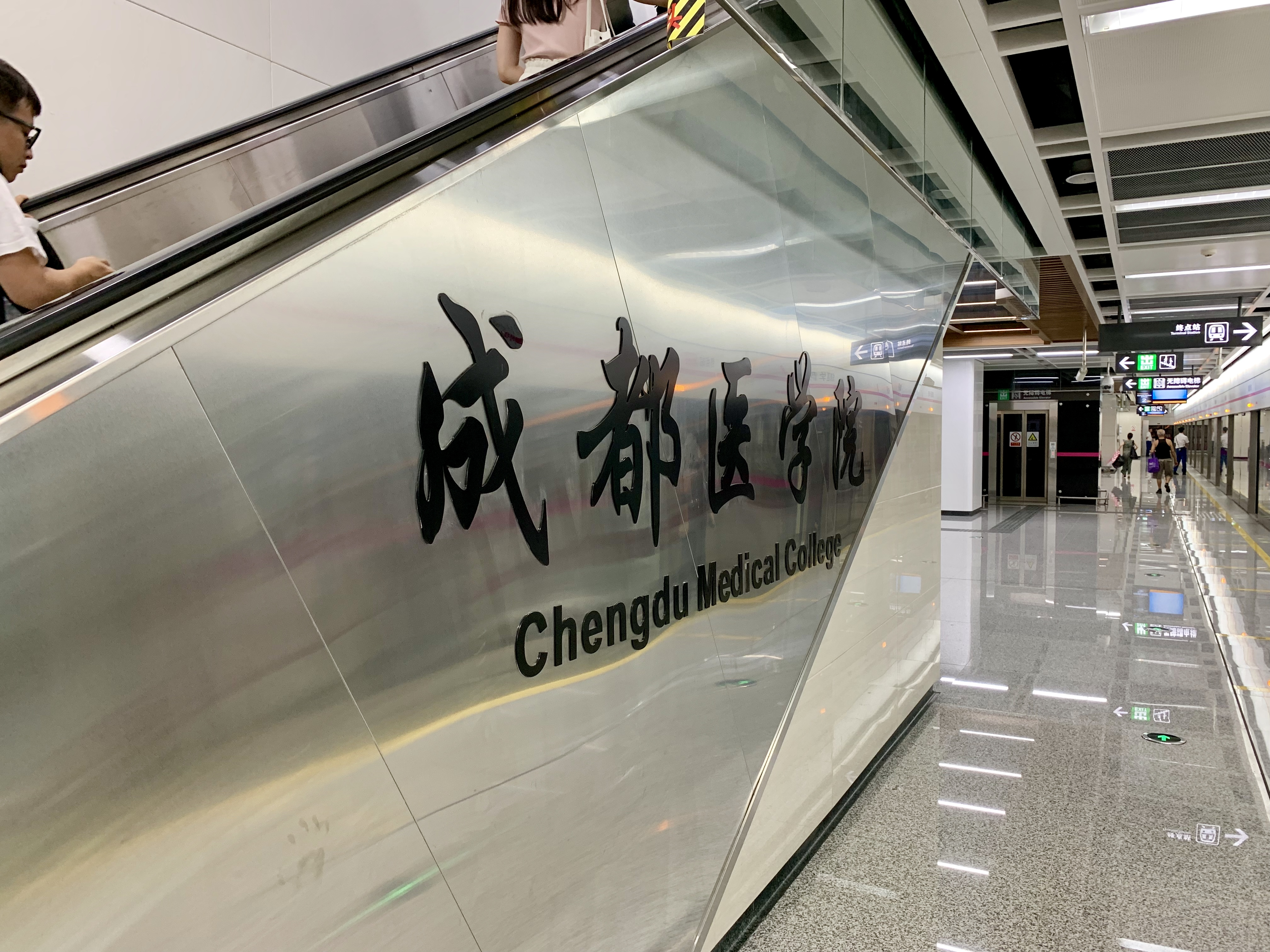
Chengdu Metro station named Chengdu Medial College Station near the campus

=== School of Medical Science ===
1. Human Anatomy and Histology and Embryology
  1. Nervous system development and regeneration and regression diseases
  2. Embryo model establishment and Cardiovascular and Neurodevelopment molecular mechanisms
2. Immunology
  1. Tumor immunology and Tumor Biology
3. Pathogenic biology
  1. Bacterial infection and anti-infection
  2. Probiotics function and level genetics
  3. Eukaryotic splicing mechanism
4. Pathology
  1. Degenerative diseases of the Nervous system
  2. Liver metabolism, Bone metabolism and tumor metabolism
  3. The pathogenesis of neuropsychiatric diseases, relating control and intervention strategies
5. Human Physiology
  1. The mechanism of body temperature regulation and fever
  2. Pathogenesis of cardiovascular disease
6. Medical Cell Biology
  1. Tumor microenvironment and metastasis mechanism
  2. Tissue Repair and Regenerative Medical High Molecular martial

=== School of Clinical Medicine ===
1. Internal medicine
  1. Nephrology
  2. Cardiovascular Diseases
  3. Endocrinology
  4. Gastroenterology
  5. Respiratory Medicine
  6. Hematology
  7. Rheumatology and Immunology
  8. Epidemiology
2. Pediatrics
3. Geriatrics
4. Neurology
5. Dermatology and Venereology
6. Emergency Medicine
7. Intensive Care Medicine
8. General Medicine
9. Rehabilitation Medicine and Physiotherapy
10. Surgery
  1. Cardiovascular Surgery
  2. Gastrointestinal Surgery
  3. Burn trauma Surgery
  4. Neurosurgery
  5. Hepatobiliary and pancreatic Surgery
  6. Urological Surgery
  7. Breast Surgery
11. Orthopedics
12. Obstetrics and Gynecology
13. Ophthalmology
14. Otorhinolaryngology
15. Anesthesiology
16. Clinicopathology
17. Clinical Laboratory Diagnostics
18. Oncology
19. Radiation Oncology
20. Radiography
21. Ultrasound Medicine

=== School of Pharmacy ===
1. Pharmacy
  1. Industrial Pharmacy
  2. Clinical Pharmacy

=== School of Laboratory Medicine ===
1. Medical technology
  1. Medical laboratory technology
  2. Medical imaging technology
  3. Clinical Nutrition

=== School of Nursing ===
1. Elderly Care
2. Chronic Disease Care

=== School of Public Health ===
1. Public Health
  1. Epidemiology and Health Statistics method and application
  2. Nutrition and health management
  3. Hygiene Inspection Technology and application

=== School of Psychology ===
1. Applied Psychology
  1. Psychological Care for the elderly
  2. Mental health of children and adolescents
  3. Emotion Regulation and Training

=== School of Marxism ===
1. Marxist Theory
  1. Basic Principles of Marxism
  2. Research on the Sinicization of Marxism
  3. Ideological Political Education

== Affiliate Hospitals ==
=== The First Affiliate Hospital of Chengdu Medical College ===
The First Affiliated Hospital of Chengdu Medical College is located in the north of Chengdu, adjacent to Baoguang Temple in Xindu District. The hospital was founded in May 1948, formerly known as the 47th Hospital of the Chinese People's Liberation Army and the Affiliated Hospital of Chengdu Military Medical College of Third Military Medical University. It is now a tertiary A general hospital directly under the Sichuan Provincial Health Commission, integrating medical treatment, teaching, scientific research, first aid, prevention, health care and rehabilitation into one.

In recent years, the hospital has been approved for 777 scientific research projects at all levels, including 28 projects from the National Natural Science Foundation of China, and 358 projects at the provincial and ministerial levels. Published 2084 scientific and technological academic papers, of which 191 were collected by SCI. Won 39 scientific and technological progress and achievement awards from the Chinese Medical Association, the Ministry of Education, and the Sichuan Provincial People's Government. The hospital participated in editing and publishing 89 monographs; 39 patents were authorized; 138 national and provincial continuing medical education projects were successfully held.

=== The Second Affiliate Hospital of Chengdu Medical College · Nuclear industry 416 Hospital ===
The Second Affiliated Hospital of Chengdu Medical College·Nuclear Industry 416 Hospital is a non-profit hospital in the southwest region of China under justification of National Nuclear Corporation, which integrates medical treatment, teaching, scientific research, and preventive health care. Located at No. 4, North Section 4, Second Ring Road, Chenghua District.

The hospital has a history of more than 100 years of running medicine. It has a profound cultural heritage. In 1911, Zhang Jian, a famous industrialist in the late Qing Dynasty, founded Suzhou Medical College. In 1959, Suzhou Medical College established the Second Affiliated Hospital of Suzhou Medical College, 1969 In 1989, the Second Affiliated Hospital of Suzhou Medical College moved to Neijiang, Sichuan as a whole under requirements of the western construction. The hospital was relocated to Chengdu and officially named the 416 Nuclear Industry Hospital.

=== The Third Affiliate Hospital of Chengdu Medical College · Pidu District People's Hospital, Chengdu ===
The People's Hospital of Pidu District of Chengdu is a national class-A general hospital integrating medical treatment, teaching, scientific research, prevention, health care and rehabilitation. It was established in September 1939. On July 17, 2020, the hospital was officially named as "The Third Affiliated Hospital of Chengdu Medical College".
