= Wang Aiping =

Wang Aiping may refer to:

- Wang Aiping (baseball) (born 1972), China national baseball team coach
- Wang Aiping (physician) (born 1958), Chinese pharmacologist and toxicologist
