= Robin C. N. Williamson =

Robin Charles Noel Williamson (born 1942) is Professor and Head of Gastrointestinal Surgery, Hammersmith Hospital, London and a former Dean and president of the Royal Society of Medicine (RSM).

The son of a Fellow of the RSM, and was educated at Emmanuel College, Cambridge and St. Bartholomew's Hospital, in 1979 he was appointed Professor of Surgery at the University of Bristol and in 1987 he moved a position as Professor & Director of Surgery of the Royal Postgraduate Medical School.

He has served as:

- senior editor of the British Journal of Surgery,
- editor of the journal HPB published by the International HPB Association
- president of the Association of Surgeons of Great Britain and Ireland,
- secretary-general and then president of the International HPB Association,
- president of the James IV Association of Surgeons and President, and
- president of the European Society of Surgery.
- chairman of the London Clinic.

In February 2001, he became associate dean of the Royal Society of Medicine, dean in October 2002 and president of the society on 15 July 2008.
