= Xijing Hospital =

Hospital in Shaanxi, China

Coordinates: 34.2700418°N 108.9865785°E

Geography
- Location: No.127, Changle West Road, Xi'an, Shaanxi, P.R.China

Organisation
- Type: military, general, teaching
- Affiliated university: Air Force Medical University

Services
- Standards: 3A hospital
- Emergency department: Yes
- Beds: 2,600

History
- Founded: November 1939

Links
- Website: www.fmmu.edu.cn

Xijing Hospital (simplified Chinese: 西京医院; traditional Chinese: 西京醫院; pinyin: Xījīng Yīyuàn) is the First Affiliated Hospital of the Air Force Medical University of the Chinese People's Liberation Army located in Xi'an, China. Founded in 1939, Xijing Hospital is now a large comprehensive Class A tertiary hospital integrating medical treatment, teaching, scientific research, prevention and health care, and is one of the top hospitals in China. Xijing Hospital stands at the world's leading level in the fields of organ transplantation.

== History ==
In November 1939, the Central Hospital was established in Yan'an.

in February 1947, the Central Hospital was reorganized into the First Rear Area Hospital of the Shaanxi-Gansu-Ningxia-Shanxi-Suiyuan Joint Defense Army.

In August 1950, the First Rear Area Hospital and the Affiliated Hospital of Northwest People's Medical College (established in Shanxi in 1947) merged to form the Second Army Hospital of the Northwest Military Region of the Chinese People's Liberation Army.

In 1954, the Second Army Hospital was renamed the Affiliated Hospital of the Fourth Military Medical University of the Chinese People's Liberation Army.

On April 7, 1954, the Fifth Military Medical University in Nanjing were merged into the Fourth Military Medical University in Xi'an, and the two affiliated hospitals were subsequently merged, still known as the Affiliated Hospital of the Fourth Military Medical University of the Chinese People's Liberation Army.

On August 29, 1969, the Affiliated Hospital of the Fourth Military Medical University moved with the University to Chongqing. From July to August 1975, the Hospital and the University moved back to Xi'an from Chongqing.

From October 2, 1984, the hospital started to use the external name of "Xijing Hospital".

In 2017, the University was renamed the "Air Force Medical University of the Chinese People's Liberation Army", and the hospital, "the First Affiliated Hospital of Air Force Medical University".

On November 20, 2015, Xijing Hospital successfully transplanted a mother's uterus to her daughter, who was born without a uterus. On January 20, 2019, the 26-year-old daughter gave birth to a healthy baby boy weighing 2 kg and 48 cm in length in Xijing Hospital. It was the first baby in China and the 14th in the world to be born in a transplanted uterus.

In 2024, Xijing Hospital was the first to report details about the transplantation of a genetically modified pig liver into a human, offering hope for new frontier of research.

In 2025, Xijing Hospital successfully performed Asia's first gene-edited pig kidney transplantation.

== Current situation ==
Xijing Hospital is at the world's leading level in the fields of organ transplantation, burns, etc. It has successively won the titles of National People's Trustworthy Demonstration Hospital, National Top 100 Hospitals, and National Heroic Group for Earthquake Relief. The name of Xijing Hospital has been recognized as a well-known Chinese trademark by the State Administration for Industry and Commerce of the People’s Republic of China.

Xijing Hospital is a medical center for difficult and complicated diseases in China's Northwest Region. It has some 2 600 hospital beds, an area of 280,000 square meters with a floor space of 437,300 square meters, and a working staff of more than 2 000 professional and technical personnel, In the year of 2017, The hospital had 3.87 million out-patient visits, 140,000 in-patients, and 87,000 operations.

There are nine national key disciplines, 17 national clinical key specialties (military construction projects), 12 military medical research institutes and six specialty centers. And there are papers published on prestigious academic journals.

As a teaching hospital of the Air Force Military Medical University, Xijing Hospital offers clinical medical courses to both undergraduate and graduate students. 34 clinical disciplines in the hospital are PhD-authorized disciplines.

== See also ==
- Air Force Medical University
- Southwest Hospital of AMU
- List of hospitals in China
