= Southwest Hospital of AMU =

Hospital in Chongqing, China

Geography
- Location: 30 Gaotanyanzheng Street, Shapingba District, Chongqing, P.R.China

Organisation
- Type: military, general, teaching
- Affiliated university: Army Medical University

Services
- Standards: 3A hospital
- Emergency department: Yes
- Beds: 2,900

History
- Founded: 1929

Links
- Website: http://www.xnyy.cn

The Southwest Hospital of AMU, shortly Southwest Hospital (simplified Chinese: 西南医院; traditional Chinese: 西南醫院; pinyin: Xīnán Yīyuàn), is a large comprehensive Grade A tertiary hospital located in Chongqing, China. Founded as the Central Hospital by the national government in Nanjing in 1929, the hospital is now the First Affiliated Hospital of the Army Medical University (AMU), responsible for medical treatment, teaching and scientific research.

== History ==
Southwest Hospital was originally the "Central Hospital" established by the Republic of China Government in Nanjing in 1929. It was the first Western-style hospital founded by Chinese people in China.

After the outbreak of the War of Resistance against Japan in 1937, the hospital moved to Changsha and Guiyang amidst the chaos of war.

In 1941, it moved to Chongqing with the Republic of China government.

In 1949, the Chinese People's Liberation Army took over the Central Hospital in Chongqing. In 1950, the hospital was renamed "Southwest Hospital", and put under the leadership of the Health Department of the Southwest Military and Political Committee.

In 1953, the hospital became a teaching hospital of the Seventh Military Medical University, maintaining the name of "Southwest Hospital" externally.

In September 1954, the teaching hospital of the Sixth Military Medical University merged into Southwest Hospital.

In August 1956, the 48th Hospital of the People's Liberation Army merged into Southwest Hospital.

In 1975, Southwest Hospital was renamed the "First Affiliated Hospital of the Third Military Medical University".

In June 2004, the Burn Unit of the hospital was awarded the title of "Model Military Medical Burn Unit" by the Central Military Commission.

In 2016, the hospital was put under the leadership of the Training and Management Department of the Central Military Commission.

In 2017, the hospital was renamed the "First Affiliated Hospital of the Army Medical University of the Chinese People's Liberation Army", or "Southwest Hospital, Army Medical University".

In 2017, nurse You Jianping was awarded the 46th Florence Nightingale Medal.

In 2018, the Army 958th Hospital was placed under the management of Southwest Hospital.

In 2019, Burns & Trauma, an all-English journal sponsored by Southwest Hospital, received a new SCI impact factor of 3.088, once again becoming the world's highest-impact journal in the field of burns.

From 2015 to May 2025, the Army Medical University sent 11 batches of totally over 100 medical experts to Ethiopia to carry out aid missions, most of whom were from the Southwest Hospital.

== Current situation ==
The hospital is now a large comprehensive Grade A tertiary hospital integrating medical treatment, teaching and research, covering a land of more than 20 hectares with a building area of 360,000 square meters. There are 2,900 beds. In 2019, it served 4.147 million outpatient and emergency visits and performed 114,000 surgeries. There are a series of high-precision medical equipment such as Leonardo Da Vinci surgical robot, PET / CT, 3.0MRI. The total value of its equipment is approximately 2.2 billion Chinese yuan.

With 10 national key disciplines, Southwest Hospital ranks among the top hospitals in China in terms of comprehensive strength in disciplines such as burns, infectious diseases, hepatobiliary diseases, minimally invasive surgery, plastic surgery, medical laboratory science, and rehabilitation therapy.

By the year 2019, the hospital had won three first prizes and 16 second prizes of the National Prize for Progress in Science and Technology, and 35 first prizes of the Military Prize for Progress in Science and Technology.

In the 2020 Fudan University Hospital Rankings, the Hospital ranked 25th nationwide overall, with its burn unit ranking 1st nationwide.

The Southwest Hospital published 62 papers listed in Nature Index for the Time frame of 1 January 2025 - 31 December 2025, ranking 141st globally and 52nd in China in healthcare.

Hospital address: 30 Gaotanyanzheng Street, Shapingba District, Chongqing. Zip code: 400038

== See also ==
- Army Medical University
- Xijing Hospital
- List of hospitals in China
