= International Hepato-Pancreato-Biliary Association =

- Abbreviation: IHPBA
- Formation: 1994
- Type: Professional association
- Headquarters: Rochester, Minnesota
- Region served: Worldwide
- Members: 3,500
- President: Professor René Adam
- Website: www.ihpba.org

International Hepato-Pancreato-Biliary Association (IHPBA) is a non-profit organization established in 1994 to focus on medical conditions and procedures related to the liver, pancreas and biliary tract.

== History ==
The organisation traces its origin to International Biliary Association (IBA), which was founded in 1978 in San Francisco. The IBA became the International Hepato-Biliary-Pancreatic Association (IHBPA) and a World Association of Hepato-Pancreato-Biliary Surgery (WAHPBS) was also formed with the first meeting at Lund on 9–13 June 1986, with 600 nearly attendees. These two organisations merged to become the IHPBA in 1994.

In 1999 the IHPBA established the journal HPB. The organisation was incorporated in the United States in June 2001, and it established the Warren Research Fellowship in the same year.

== Journal ==
HPB is the academic journal owned by the International Hepato-Pancreato-Biliary Association (IHPBA) and is also the official Journal of the American Hepato-Pancreato-Biliary Association (AHPBA), the Asian-Pacific Hepato Pancreatic Biliary Association (A-PHPBA) and the European-African Hepato-Pancreatic Biliary Association (E-AHPBA).

The HPB journal is dedicated to research on all aspects of benign and malignant hepatobiliary disease and its management.

Surgical oncology represents a large part of the HPB Journal, specifically focusing on the challenges faced during management of cancer involving the liver, biliary system and pancreas.

HPB produces twelve issues over the year, featuring content such as leading articles, expert reviews, original research, images, editorials, virtual journal clubs and reader correspondences. It is the journal in which the manuscripts resulting from key presentations at regional and international congresses are published. As of 2026, HPB has an impact factor of 3.3.

== World congress ==
Since the first meeting of the merged IHPBA in 1994, the Congresses have been held even years.

- June 1994: Boston, US
- 1996: Bologna, Italy
- 1998: Madrid, Spain
- 2000: Brisbane, Australia
- April 25–29, 2002: Tokyo, Japan
- 6th World Congress - Washington, US in 2004
- 7th World Congress - Edinburgh, Scotland in 2006
- 8th World Congress - Mumbai, India in 2008
- April 2010: Buenos Aires, Argentina
- July 1–5, 2012: Paris, France
- 11th World Congress - Seoul, South Korea (March 22-27, 2014)
- 12th World Congress - São Paulo, Brazil (April 20-23, 2016)
- 13th World Congress - Geneva, Switzerland (September 4-7, 2018)
- 14th World Congress - Virtual, Australia (November 27-29, 2020)
- 15th World Congress - New York, United States (March 31 - April 2, 2022)
- 16th World Congress - Cape Town, South Africa (May 15-18, 2024)

== Presidents ==
No.	Term	President	Ref
1	1994–1996	David Carr-Locke	
2	1996–1998	Robin Williamson	
3	1998–2000	Huug Obertop	
4	2000–2002	James Toouli	
5	2002–2004	Joseph W. Y. Lau	
6	2004–2006	Henry A. Pitt	
7	2006–2008	Markus Büchler	
8	2008–2010	Yuji Nimura	
9	2010–2012	C. Wright Pinson	
10	2012–2014	O. James Garden	
11	2014–2016	Palepu Jagannath	
12	2016–2018	Oscar Imventarza	
13	2018–2020	Martin Smith	
14	2021–2022	Norihiro Kokudo	
15	2022–2024	William R. Jarnagin	
16	2024–present	René Adam	

== Related associations ==
=== Regional associations ===
Regional Associations currently affiliated with the IHPBA include:

- Americas Hepato-Pancreato-Biliary Association (AHPBA), incorporated in the United States in November 1994, holding its first regional Americas Congress in 1997.
- Asian-Pacific Hepato-Pancreato-Biliary Association (A-PHPBA), incorporated in Hong Kong, its predecessor being the Asian Society of Hepato-Biliary-Pancreatic Surgery which held regional congresses in Asia from 1991.
- European Hepato-Pancreato-Biliary Association (EHPBA), incorporated in Germany in 2005, its predecessor being the European Chapter of the IHPBA, initiated European Congresses in the odd years in 1995.

=== National chapters ===
National Chapters variably affiliated with the IHPBA have existed in Argentina, Greece, Italy, Japan, and the United States for a number of years.

National Chapters have emerged in Brazil, Canada, China, the Czech Republic, Ecuador, Egypt, Germany, India, Italy, Korea, Scandinavia, South Africa, Sri Lanka and the United Kingdom.

== See also ==
- Hepato-biliary diseases
- Pancreatic diseases
- Hepato-pancreato-biliary surgery
