= Naval Medical University =

Public medical university in Shanghai, China

- 中国人民解放军海军军医大学
- Former name: Second Military Medical University
- Type: Public university
- Established: September 1949; 77 years ago
- Affiliations: People's Liberation Army Navy
- Location: Shanghai, China
- Campus: Urban area 670,000 square metres (7,211,820 sq ft)
- Website: www.smmu.edu.cn

Naval Medical University
- Simplified Chinese: 中国人民解放军海军军医大学
- Traditional Chinese: 中國人民解放軍海軍軍醫大學
Transcriptions
Standard Mandarin
- Hanyu Pinyin: Zhōngguó Rénmín Jiěfàngjūn Hǎijūn Jūnyī Dàxué

The Naval Medical University (中国人民解放军海军军医大学) is a public medical university in Yangpu, Shanghai, China. It is affiliated with the People's Liberation Army Navy. The university is part of the Double First-Class Construction.

The university was previously known as the People's Liberation Army Second Military Medical University (中国人民解放军第二军医大学). It was earlier named the People's Medical College of the East China Military Commanding Region. The building is adjacent to Fudan University and Tongji University and covers an area of nearly 1.1 square kilometres (270 acres). The premises have a total floor space of over 670,000 square metres (7,211,820 sq ft), including a complex of modern teaching buildings, a library, an experiment building and teaching hospitals of the first rate in China. The library itself covers an area over 11,000 square metres (118,403 sq ft) with a collection of over 500,000 book volumes.

== Rankings ==
As of 2022, the Second Military Medical University is ranked between the top 601-700 among world universities according to the Academic Ranking of World Universities.

== Affiliated hospitals ==
- Changhai Hospital (First Affiliated hospital)
- Changzheng Hospital (Second Affiliated hospital)
- Eastern Hepatobiliary Surgery Hospital (Third Affiliated hospital)
