= Army Medical University =

Chinese military academy, medical

- 中国人民解放军陆军军医大学
- Logo of the Army Medical University
- Former name: Third Military Medical University
- Type: Military
- Established: 1954; 72 years ago
- Affiliations: People's Liberation Army Ground Force
- Officer in charge: Maj Gen Wang Yungui (王云贵)
- Location: 30 Gaotanyan Zhengjie, Shapingba district, Chongqing, China; 29.5371°N 106.4471°E
- Campus: Multiple
- Website: http://www.tmmu.edu.cn/
- Location within Chongqing

The Army Medical University (中国人民解放军陆军军医大学) is a public medical university in Shapingba, Chongqing, China. It is affiliated with the People's Liberation Army Ground Force.

The Army Medical University was founded in 1954 by the merger of former Sixth and Seventh Medical Universities. The predecessor of the Sixth Medical University was the Military Medical School of the Fourth Field Army of the People's Liberation Army and the Nanchang Medical College (formerly Zhongzheng Medical College). The Seventh Medical University originated from the Medical School of Taiyue Military Region (later the Medical College of the Second Field Army). After merging, the school was named "Seventh Military Medical University", and relocated to Shanghai in 1969. It moved back to Chongqing in 1975, when the Central Military Commission renamed it "Third Military Medical University". In 2017, the institution was renamed "Army Medical University" during the latest Chinese military reform.

== Affiliated hospitals ==
- First Affiliated Hospital (Southwest Hospital)
- Second Affiliated Hospital (Xinqiao Hospital)
- Third Affiliated Hospital (Daping Hospital)

== See also ==
- Academic institutions of the armed forces of China
