= Hepato-pancreato-biliary surgery =

Surgical specialty of the liver and pancreas

Hepato-pancreato-biliary surgeon
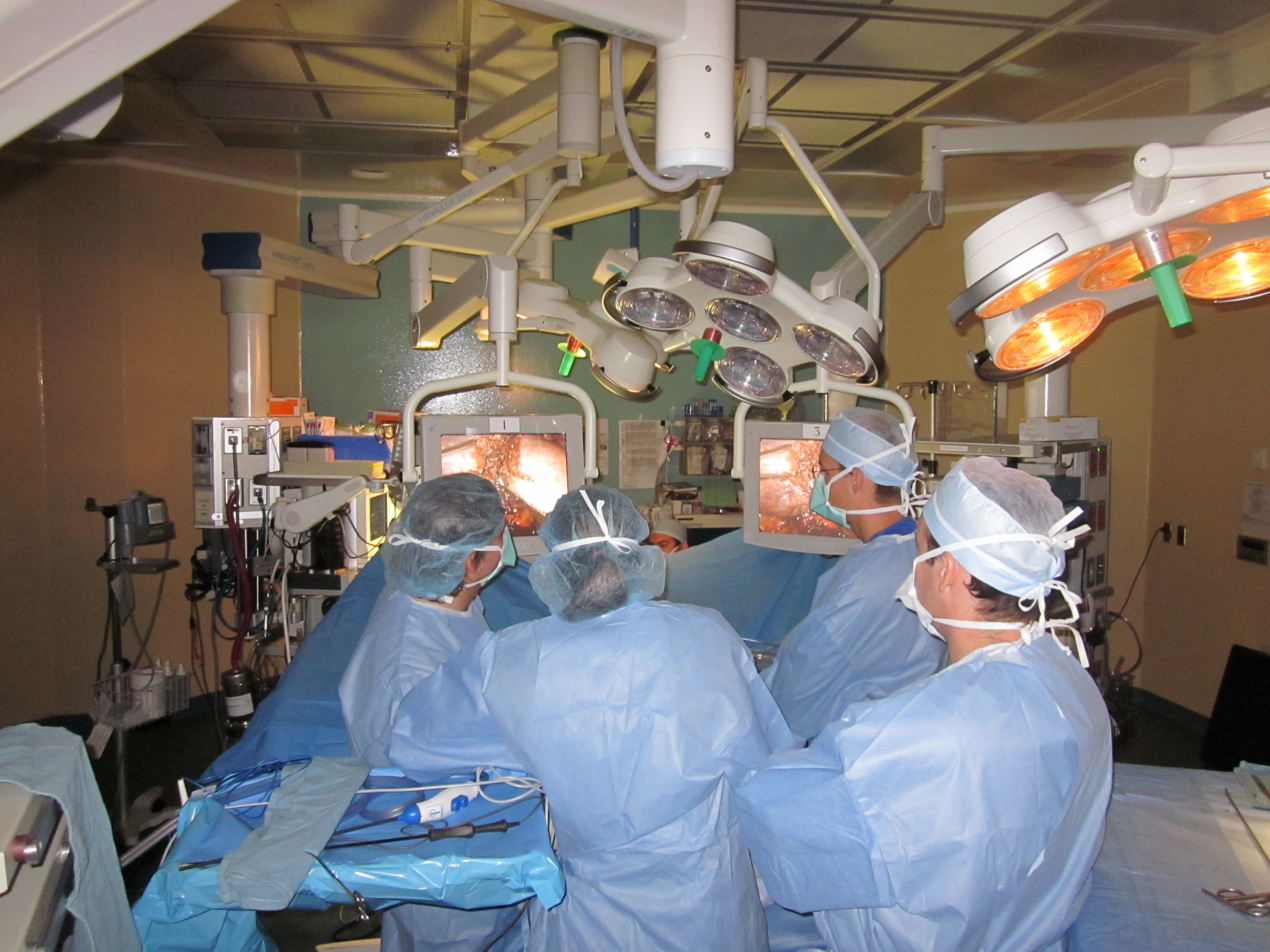
- Surgeons performing a laparoscopic hepatectomy (liver resection)

Occupation
- Names: Doctor; Surgeon
- Occupation type: Specialty
- Activity sectors: Medicine, Surgery

Description
- Education required: Bachelor of Medicine, Bachelor of Surgery (M.B.B.S.); Doctor of Medicine (M.D.); Bachelor of Medicine, Bachelor of Surgery (MBChB); Doctor of Osteopathic medicine (D.O.); Master of Surgery (M.S.)
- Fields of employment: Hospitals, Clinics

Hepato-pancreato-biliary surgery (HPB surgery), also referred to as hepatobiliary surgery, is a surgical subspecialty of general surgery that is concerned with the surgical treatment of disorders affecting the liver, pancreas and biliary system.

== Conditions ==
Conditions treated by HPB surgeons include, but are not limited to:

- Tumours of the pancreas (adenocarcinoma, pancreatic neuroendocrine tumours, Intraductal papillary mucinous neoplasm (IPMN), etc.)
- Pancreatic cysts
- Acute and chronic pancreatitis
- Gallstones
- Tumours of the biliary tract (gallbladder cancer and cholangiocarcinoma)
- Portal hypertension
- Cholangitis (inflammation of the bile ducts due to ascending bacterial infection of the biliary tree)
- Tumours of the liver (colorectal liver metastasis, Hepatocellular adenoma, hemangioma, hepatocellular carcinoma)
- Hepatobiliary and pancreatic trauma

== Procedures ==
HPB procedures can be performed through open (traditional laparotomy), laparoscopic or robotic approaches. Regardless of the surgical modality, major HPB procedures carry a high perioperative morbidity and mortality risk. This is due largely to the technical complexity of these procedures and the complicated vasculo-biliary anatomy surgeons must navigate. Common HPB interventions are categorised below according to their primary anatomical location:

=== Biliary tract ===
An endoscopy technique that may be performed by HPB surgeons is endoscopic retrograde cholangiopancreatography. During this procedure, fluoroscopy outlines the biliary tree, facilitating possible interventions such as sphincterotomy and stone extraction.

=== Liver ===
HPB surgeons treat benign and malignant diseases of the liver using advanced surgical procedures. These include liver resections, transplants and ablation therapies — such as microwave ablation, radiofrequency ablation, cryoablation and histotripsy — to destroy tumours.

=== Pancreas ===
Resectional surgery offers the only chance of cure in pancreatic and other periampullary cancers. Pancreatic cancer has a 12% 5-year survival rate; however the American Society of Clinical Oncology estimates that only 20% of pancreatic cancer patients may be eligible for surgery. The primary surgical treatment of pancreatic cancer within the head of the pancreas is a pancreaticoduodenectomy, also known as the Whipple procedure.

== Notable hepato-pancreato-biliary surgeons ==
- Leslie H. Blumgart – one of the most influential figures in the field who sought to make hepato-pancreato-biliary surgery a recognised specialty and developed the Blumgart pancreaticojejunostomy technique.
- Allen Whipple – namesake of the pancreaticoduodenectomy, described the primary features of insulinomas (Whipple's triad), and revived portocaval anastomosis as a treatment for portal hypertension.

== See also ==
- International Hepato-Pancreato-Biliary Association
- Surgical oncology
- Abdominal surgery
