= Air Force Medical University =

Public medical university in Xi'an, China

- 中国人民解放军空军军医大学
- Former names: Fourth Military Medical University
- Type: Public university
- Established: 1941; 85 years ago
- Affiliations: People's Liberation Army Air Force
- Location: Xi'an, Shaanxi, China
- Website: www.fmmu.edu.cn

The Air Force Medical University (中国人民解放军空军军医大学) is a public medical university in Xincheng, Xi'an, Shaanxi, China. It is affiliated with the People's Liberation Army Air Force. The university is part of the Double First-Class Construction. The university was formerly known as the Fourth Military Medical University (FMMU; 第四军医大学) until 2017.

It was formed by the merger of former Fourth Military Medical University (First Military Medical College) and Fifth Military Medical University (Third Military Medical College ). The predecessor of Fifth Military Medical University is the "Medicine School of National Central University", which was the best medicine school in China, founded in Nanjing in 1935. It was renamed the "Medicine School of Nanjing University" in 1949, and renamed "Eastern Military Medical College" and then "Third Military Medical College" and "Fifth Military Medical University" in 1952. The "People's Medical College of Northwestern Military Region", the predecessor of former Fourth Military Medical University was founded in 1941, relocated in Xi'an in 1948, and renamed "Northwestern Military Medical College" and then "First Military Medical College" and "Fourth Military Medical University" in 1952. The two medical universities were merged to form the new Fourth Military Medical University affiliated to PLA in 1954 in Xi'an, the capital of Shaanxi Province, China. It is part of the Double First-Class Construction, with Double First Class status in certain disciplines.
