= Medical missions in China =

Medical missions in China by Catholic and Protestant physicians and surgeons of the 19th and early 20th centuries laid many foundations for modern medicine in China. Western medical missionaries established the first modern clinics and hospitals, provided the first training for nurses, and opened the first medical schools in China. Work was also done in opposition to the abuse of opium. Medical treatment and care came to many Chinese who were addicted, and eventually public and official opinion was influenced in favor of bringing an end to the destructive trade. By 1901, China was the most popular destination for medical missionaries. The 150 foreign physicians operated 128 hospitals and 245 dispensaries, treating 1.7 million patients. In 1894, male medical missionaries comprised 14 percent of all missionaries; women doctors were four percent. Modern medical education in China started in the early 20th century at hospitals run by international missionaries.

== Background ==
Traditional medicine in China has an ancient history. Daoists developed breathing exercises, and some vegetable and mineral remedies, but their efforts were made in hopes of gaining immortality rather than for providing therapy. Buddhism brought new ideas on the cause of disease to China, emphasizing the part played by the mind. Buddha himself is reported to have said to Chi Po "You go and heal his body first, I will come later to treat his mental suffering."

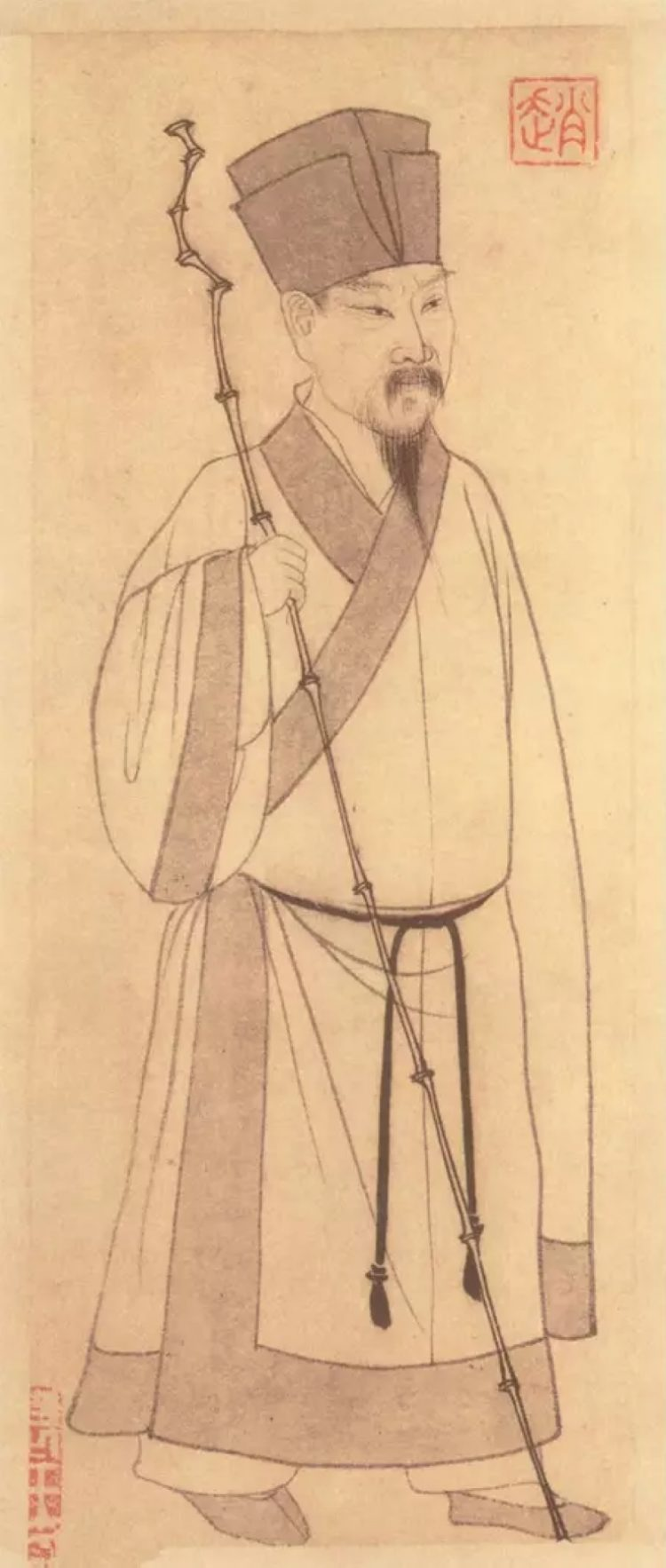
An early Yuan dynasty portrait of Su Shi, by Zhao Mengfu 趙孟頫.

The first hospital in China was reportedly founded by the poet Su Shi in Hangzhou during the Song dynasty about the same time that St Bartholomew's Hospital and St Thomas' Hospitals were founded in London. Su Shi's hospital employed Buddhist monks. Records from Mongolia mention a man named Aisie (Isaiah) who was a linguist, astrologer, and a chief physician to Kublai Khan under the Yuan dynasty. He opened a Hospital in Peking in 1271. Aisie may have been of either French or Jewish ethnicity. A record of 1273 describes him as a Muslim, but an earlier record as a Christian.

There is no evidence that the Nestorian Christian mission of 635 A.D. or its later mission under the Yuan dynasty, or the Franciscan Mission of 1294 under John of Montecorvino, engaged in any medical missionary work.

In 1569 the Catholics founded the "Santa Casa de Misericordia" in Macau. In 1667 the Hospital of St. Raphael was founded there as well. The latter is still under the auspices of the Santa Casa, as is also the Lara Reis Cancer Clinic, Praia Grande, Macau.

Jesuit Missions took part in medical work in the 17th and 18th centuries. Xu Guangqi, a Chinese minister, was converted by Matteo Ricci, and baptized with the name of Paul. Jesuit missionaries used a pound of cinchona bark obtained from India to successfully treat the Kangxi Emperor and members of the court for malaria. Brother Bernard Rhodes arrived in China in 1699 and operated a dispensary from his house. The Court officials remarked about him: "He talks little, promises little and performs much ... his charity extends to everybody, to poor as well as rich. The only thing that discomforts us is that we cannot induce him to accept the least reward".

== Protestant medical missions ==
The first western medical effort in China was the foundation of a public dispensary for Chinese at Macau in 1820 by the Robert Morrison and John Livingstone, who was a surgeon to the East India Company. Although Morrison was not a medical practitioner, he had studied briefly at St. Bartholomew's Hospital in London. One of the objects of Morrison's dispensary was to discover whether the Chinese Pharmacopoeia "might not supply something in addition to the means now possessed of lessening human suffering in the West." Morrison stealthily purchased a collection of over 800 volumes of Chinese medical books, along with a collection of Chinese medicines. A Chinese physician, Dr. Lee, directed the dispensing of medicines, with an herbalist in attendance to explain the properties of articles supplied by him.

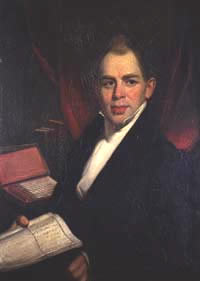
Peter Parker

A significant moment occurred in 1828, when Dr. Thomas Richardson Colledge, a Christian surgeon of the East India Company, opened a hospital in Canton (the Canton Hospital). Colledge believed that Christians had a duty to help the sick in China, but he was never able to devote his time fully to medical missionary work. He corresponded with the existing Protestant mission societies, and in 1834 Dr. Peter Parker, the first full-time Protestant medical missionary, who Colledge mentored, was able to open a hospital at Canton in connection with the mission of the American Board.

Parker quickly realized the need for trained Chinese help, and trained his first medical student Kwan Ato in 1836. Parker introduced both ether and chloroform anesthesia to China. His medical school is most remembered because of Dr. Sun Yat Sen, who studied there in 1886 for one year before returning to resume his studies in Hong Kong.

In 1835-36 Parker and Colledge and a few Christian foreign residents formed the Medical Missionary Society of China. In a little time the news of Parker's mission spread. Public preaching was not permitted in China, and foreigners were restricted to residence at the Thirteen Factories at Canton. But the new hospital appealed to the Chinese in spite of their suspicions. In a Chinese village, married women would sit all night in the streets in order to get a chance in the line of patients crowding upon the doctor the next morning. When the First Opium War closed Parker's hospital in 1840, 9,000 severe cases had been relieved besides uncounted minor ones.

In 1839 there were only two missionary physicians in China; by 1842 more reinforcements had arrived. 50 years later there were 61 hospitals and 44 dispensaries, 100 male and twenty-six female physicians, with a corps of trained native assistants connected to the missionary endeavor. Before the spread of Western methods in China, the Chinese generally had had little knowledge of surgery, but demand for surgical treatment soon far exceeded the capacity of the mission hospitals. In the annual reports of the hospitals in 1895 it was reported that annually no fewer than 500,000 individuals were treated and about 70,000 operations performed, of which about 8,000 were for serious conditions. At first the Chinese had to learn to have confidence in the surgeons, and submit calmly to the severest operations. A patient's relatives were consulted, and usually there were no resentments expressed if a dangerous operation failed.

The motives that brought physicians to China to work in mission hospitals were often a puzzle to the Chinese in the beginning. According to an 1895 dissertation by Charles Estes Sumner, the patients, who were being treated with gentleness and skill that seemed almost miraculous to them, often felt that the religion that had inspired such work must be good. He explained that a few showed no gratitude, thinking that they have rendered a service in allowing a foreigner to treat them, and that many had no desire to accept the religion of their doctors, though some did. It was his belief that many patients converted to Christianity after they returned to their distant homes. This account paints an Orientalist picture of the Chinese and their ingratitude to an assumed noble Christianity, which is indicative of early Western paternalism in regards to the treatment of Asians.

Western medical literature in the Chinese language was first provided by the medical missionaries, and native physicians were trained in Western methods for the first time by them as well.

Western medicine was introduced to China in the 19th century, mainly by medical missionaries sent from various Christian mission organizations, such as the London Missionary Society (Britain), the Wesleyan Methodist Ministry (Britain), Methodist Church (Britain) and the Presbyterian Church (USA). Benjamin Hobson (1816–1873), a medical missionary sent by the London Missionary Society in 1839, set up a highly successful Wai Ai Clinic (惠愛醫館) in Guangzhou, China. In 1887, Edward George Horder(1852-1908) of the Church Missionary Society opened the first hospital in Pakhoi(Beihai). The Hong Kong College of Medicine for Chinese (香港華人西醫書院) also was founded in 1887, by the London Missionary Society, with its first graduate (in 1892) being Sun Yat-sen (孫中山). Sun later led the 1911 Revolution, which changed China from an empire to a republic. The Hong Kong College of Medicine for Chinese was the forerunner of the School of Medicine of the University of Hong Kong, which started in 1911.

Due to the social custom that men and women should not be near to one another, the women of China were reluctant to be treated by male doctors of Western Medicine. This resulted in a tremendous need for female doctors of Western Medicine in China. The Women's Foreign Missionary Society hoped to alleviate the suffering of Chinese women by sending Dr. Lucinda L. Combs the first female missionary to Peking (Beijing) China in 1873. Dr. Combs also established the first hospital for women and children in 1875. The first Women's Hospital in Shanghai, Margaret Williamson Hospital, was opened in 1884 by Elizabeth Reifsnyder. Subsequently, female medical missionary Dr. Mary H. Fulton (1854–1927) was sent by the Foreign Missions Board of the Presbyterian Church (USA) to found the first medical college for women in China. Known as the Hackett Medical College for Women. (夏葛女子醫學院), This college was located in Guangzhou, China, and was enabled by a large donation from Mr. Edward A.K. Hackett (1851–1916) of Indiana, USA. The college was dedicated in 1902 and offered a four-year curriculum. By 1915, there were more than 60 students, mostly in residence. Most students became Christians, due to the influence of Dr. Fulton. The college was officially recognized, with its diplomas marked with the official stamp of the Guangdong provincial government. The college was aimed at the spreading of Christianity and modern medicine and the elevation of Chinese women's social status. The David Gregg Hospital for Women and Children (also known as Yuji Hospital 柔濟醫院 was affiliated with this college. The graduates of this college included Lee Sun Chau (周理信, 1890–1979) and WONG Yuen-hing (黃婉卿), both of whom graduated in the late 1910s and then practiced medicine in the hospitals in Guangdong province. Coral Wong graduated from Hackett in 1921 and became the director of the Ningteh Hospital where she added maternity services and expanded the hospital.

There were peculiar dangers even in this humanitarian work. In times of trouble, stories were circulated that the foreign doctors plucked out human eyes to make charms. The Yangzhou riot of 1868 was caused by this kind of misunderstanding. When the Bubonic plague broke out in Canton and Hong Kong in summer 1894, a rumor was started that foreign doctors were killing the people by scattering scent-bags, one whiff of which would cause death, and at one point a general uprising was being planned to kill the foreigners.

Most of the early mission hospitals began with often only one medical missionary, and no other trained staff. One of the first mission hospitals was the "Chinese Hospital" operated by the London Missionary Society in Shanghai, founded by Dr. William Lockhart in 1844 (who had opened his first Chinese missionary hospital in Dinghai in 1840, while the island of Zhoushan was occupied by British troops). It was later known as the "Shantung Road Hospital" and the "Lester Chinese Hospital".

In 1850, William Welton established a medical mission at Fuh-chow which was expanded following the Black Stone Hill anti-religion unrest. Birdwood Van Someren Taylor was charged by John Wolfe to open iteinerant and mobile dispensaries at Fuh-Chow (1878), Fuh-Ning (1883), and Hinghwa (1894) his largest. Taylor established medical education programs in each which led to the Union Medical College in 1911 where Taylor was the Founding Principal. Union was started by the Church Mission Sociest, American Congregationalists, and MEthodists Episcopalians. Joint medical colleges became the norm starting in 1901.

The Taiping Rebellion interrupted the progress of medical missions until 1865, when mission hospitals and medical schools began to be established and organized more permanently. The Tung Wah Hospital was established at Hong Kong, and the medical services of the Chinese Maritime Customs with their valuable medical reports began during this period. The Customs Medical Service's doctors did not normally treat native patients.

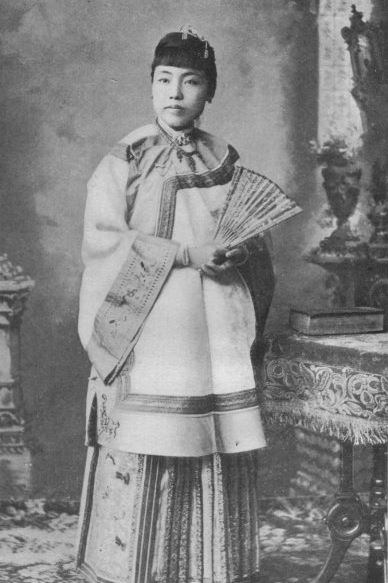
Fuzhounese Hü King Eng on graduation from the Woman's Medical College of Philadelphia in 1894.

Sir Patrick Menson was on the staff of the "Amoy Missionary Hospital". He discovered Paragonimiasis during his service there. In 1866 the Revs. Hong Neok Woo and E. H. Thompson, D.D., of the American Episcopal Church Mission, founded the early St. Luke's Hospital. In 1871 Dr. James Gait of the Church Missionary Society arrived in Hangzhou to found a hospital, later known as the Kwang-Chi Hospital, which was greatly developed under the later Dr. David Durean Main, and before World War II, with its associated leprosarium and tuberculosis sanatorium, had a total of 459 beds. In 1875, Sigourney Trask received funding from the Methodist Episcopal Church mission to build a woman's hospital in Fuzhou, which had 1,208 registered patients by the end of its first year. Trask taught a local Fuzhounese student Hü King Eng, who she later arranged for to study medicine in the US. Hü then returned to practise in Fuzhou in 1895 and trained local Chinese women in western medicine.

In 1880 the London Missionary Society constructed the Tientsin Mission Hospital and Dispensary, under the direction of Dr. John Kenneth Mackenzie. Dr. Fred C. Roberts brought succeeded Mackenzie and brought the hospital to regional prominence.

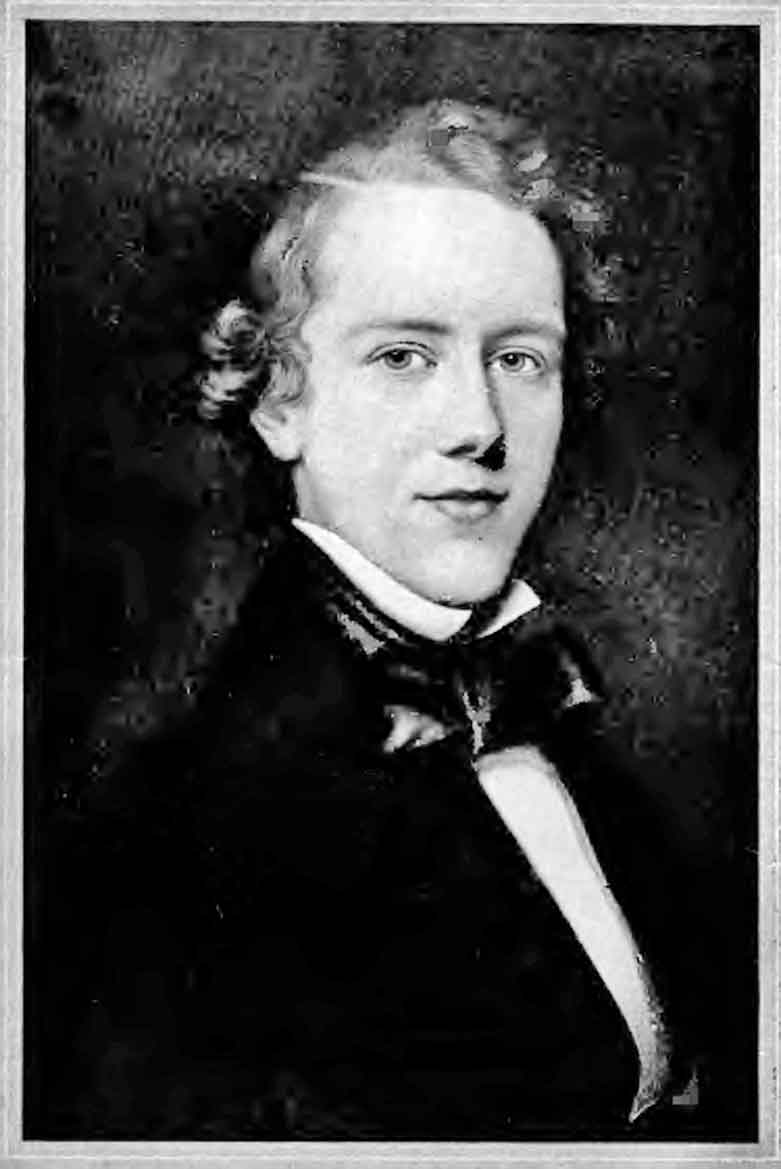
Hudson Taylor at age 21.

Another notable medical missionary to China during this period was Hudson Taylor MRCS, founder of the China Inland Mission, who was trained at the Royal London Hospital. Although initially the CIM had few trained physicians, it later brought in numbers of highly trained missionaries such as R. Harold A. Schofield and A. J. Broomhall. In north Eastern China (Manchuria) a hospital (now known, again, as the Sheng Jing Hospital was founded in 1883 by Dugald Christie. Christie later founded the adjacent and closely connected Mukden Medical College in 1912.

== Taiwan ==
Medical mission work in Taiwan was begun by the Dr. James Laidlaw Maxwell in 1865. Maxwell was the father of two notable medical missionaries to China, Profs. James Preston Maxwell and James Laidlaw Maxwell, Junior. Preston worked as professor of gynecology at the Peking Union Medical College, and James Junior worked in the former China Medical Association and as Far East Secretary of the Mission to Lepers. James Junior finally returned to China early in 1949 to serve as a leprosy specialist at Hangzhou, as well as acting as professor of medicine in the Zhejiang Medical College. He died there in 1951, and had earned the respect of the Government of the People's Republic, which was represented at his funeral. The "Maxwell Memorial Centre" at Hay Ling Chau, Hong Kong, is named after him.

== 20th century ==
Cecil Frederick Robertson FRCS, an English Baptist missionary and a fellow of the Royal College of Surgeons of England, arrived in China in 1909. He helped to operate the Xi'an Hospital in Shaanxi and was known for his treatment of civilians and rebel soldiers in the 1911 Revolution, as well as his work toward the establishment of a Red Cross League and a Hospital for Disabled Soldiers in Shaanxi.

Of the 500 hospitals in China in 1931, 235 were run by Protestant missions and 10 by Catholic missions. The mission hospitals accounted for 61 percent of Western trained doctors, 32 percent of nurses and 50 percent of medical schools. Already by 1923 China had half of the world's missionary hospital beds and half the world's missionary doctors.

By 1937 there were 254 mission hospitals in China, but more than half of these were eventually destroyed by Japanese bombing during World War II or otherwise due to the Second Sino-Japanese War or the Chinese Civil War. After World War II most of these hospitals were at least partially rehabilitated, and eventually passed to the control of the Government of the People's Republic of China, but are still functioning as hospitals.

== See also ==
- Christianity in China
- List of Christian Hospitals in China
- L. Nelson Bell
- Medical missions
