= List of Christian hospitals in China =

In 1910 126 Church Hospitals supplied data for the China Medical Journal for vol 25 no. 5. There were 175 Medical Missionaries in those hospitals. The report states that there were a total of 415 Medical Missionaries in China at the time.

As of 1937 there were 254 mission hospitals in China, and more than half of these were eventually destroyed by Japanese bombing during World War II or otherwise due to the Second Sino-Japanese War or the Chinese Civil War. After World War II most of these hospitals were at least partially rehabilitated, and eventually passed to the control of the Government of the People's Republic of China, but are still functioning as hospitals.

- Amoy Missionary Hospital
- Bethel Hospital in Shanghai (1920)
- Bresee Memorial Hospital (1925), named in honour of Phineas Bresee located in Da Ming, Hebei. Operated by the Church of the Nazarene.
- Borden Memorial Hospital
- (Canton Ophthalmic Hospital) Guangzhou Boji Hospital (1835) Peter Parker (physician)
- Chengdu Eye, Ear, Nose and Throat Hospital (1894)
- Chungking Canadian Mission Hospital (1896)
- Chungking Methodist Union Hospital (1892)
- David Gregg Hospital for Women and Children (also known as Yuji Hospital 柔濟醫院) (1902), affiliated with Hackett Medical College for Women 夏葛女子醫學院, located in Guangzhou.
- Goldsby King Memorial Hospital in Zhenjiang (1922)
- Love and Mercy Hospital (1887) (Qingjiangpu) - Absalom Sydenstricker (father of Pearl Buck) and later occupied by L. Nelson Bell
- Kathleen Mallory Hospital for Women in Laichowfu (1901)
- Kiating Canadian Mission Hospital (1894)
- Kwang-Chi Hospital (1871)
- Lester Chinese Hospital (1844) William Lockhart (surgeon)
- Louella Roach Alexander Hospital for Women in Pingtu (1890)
- Luchow Canadian Mission Hospital (1909)
- Mackenzie Memorial Hospital (1880)
- Mayfield-Tyzzer Hospital for Men in Laichowfu (1901)
- Methodist Hospital in Kaifeng, Henan
- Mukden Medical College & Hospital
- Hospital in Ningbo (William Parker) (1843)
- Oxner Memorial Hospital for Men in Pingtu (1890)
- Penghsien Canadian Mission Hospital
- Roberts Memorial Hospital (1903)
- Ronghsien Canadian Mission Hospital
- St. Andrew's Hospital in Beijing
- St. Barnabas's Hospital in Beijing
- St. Elizabeth's Hospital in Shanghai
- St. Luke's Hospital in Shanghai (1866)
- St. Peter's Hospital in Wuchang
- St. Stephen's Hospital in Beijing
- Tzeliutsing Canadian Mission Hospital (1906)
- United Church of Canada Mission Hospital for Men (1892)
- University Hospital of West China Union University (1942)
- Warren Memorial Hospital in Hwanghsien Dr. T.W. Ayers
- Woolston Memorial Hospital, (19th century)
- Zicong Methodist Union Hospital (1908)
