= Iva (given name) =

Iva is a given name.

== Feminine name ==
Iva is a feminine given name found mostly in Slavic countries (Cyrillic: Ива), but also occasionally in English-speaking countries and elsewhere. The name Iva comes from the Old Slavic name Ivana, which is the feminine form of the name Ivan. The root of the name Ivan is in the Hebrew name Yochanan, which means God is merciful or God's grace.

Notable people with the name include:

- Iva Marín Adrichem (1998), Dutch-Icelandic singer
- Iva Bigelow Weaver (1875-1932), American soprano singer, music educator
- Iva Bittová (born 1958), Czech avant-garde violinist, singer and composer
- Iva Borović (born 1988), Croatian basketball player
- Iva Budařová (born 1960), Czech tennis player
- Iva Bukač (born 1994), Croatian football player
- Iva Bule (born 2004), Croatian handball player
- Iva Campbell Fallis (1883–1956), Canadian senator
- Iva Casuse Honwynum (born 1964), Native American artist, social activist, and cultural practitioner
- Iva Ciglar (born 1985), Croatian basketball player
- Iva Despić-Simonović (1891–1961), Yugoslav sculptor
- Iva Durham Vennard (1871–1945), American educator and religious figure
- Iva Frühlingová (born 1982), Czech singer and model
- Iva Grbas (born 1987), Croatian basketball player
- Iva Grijalva Pashova (born c. 1986), Bulgarian-Nicaraguan beauty pageant contestant and model
- Iva Hercíková (1935 - 2007), Czech author
- Iva Janžurová (born 1941), Czech actress
- Iva Jovic (born 2007), American tennis player
- Iva Jurišić (born 1994), Croatian volleyball player
- Iva Kitchell (1908–1983), American concert dancer, dance satirist and comedian
- Iva Landeka (born 1989), Croatian football player
- Iva Majoli (born 1977), Croatian tennis player
- Iva Mihanović (born 1978), German-Croatian operatic soprano and concert singer
- Iva Mabelle Miller (1880–1951), American physician, medical missionary
- Iva Mišak (born 1993), Croatian alpine skier
- Iva Miteva (born 1972), Bulgarian lawyer and politician
- Iva Mladenovska (born 2007), Macedonian handball player
- Iva Obradović (born 1984), Serbian rower
- Iva Pacetti (1898–1981), Italian operatic dramatic soprano
- Iva Pekárková (born 1963), Czech author
- Iva Perovanović (born 1983), Montenegrin basketball player
- Iva Prandzheva (born 1972), Bulgarian athlete jumper
- Iva Prčić (born 1987), Serbian basketball player
- Iva J. Rider, the English name of Atalie Unkalunt (1895–1954), a Cherokee singer, interior designer, activist, and writer
- Iva Ritschelová (1964–2017), Czech economist
- Iva Radoš (born 1995), Croatian taekwondo practitioner
- Iva Roglić (born 1988), Serbian basketball player
- Iva Serdar (born 1982), Croatian basketball player
- Iva Shepard (1886–1973), American silent film actress
- Iva Shkodreva-Karagiozova (born 1971), Bulgarian biathlete
- Iva Sidash (born 1995), Ukrainian photographer
- Iva Slišković (born 1984), Croatian basketball player
- Iva Slonjšak (born 1997), Croatian basketball player
- Iva Snyder, fictional character on the daytime soap opera As the World Turns
- Iva Stewart (1914–1985), American model and film actress
- Iva Tepeshanova (born 1983), Bulgarian rhythmic gymnast
- Iva Todorić (born 1993), Croatian basketball player
- Iva Toguri (1916–2006), Japanese-American disc jockey and radio personality
- Iva Tolić (born 1974), Croatian biophysicist
- Iva Videnova (born 1987), Bulgarian chess player
- Iva Williams, American politician
- Iva Withers (1917–2014), Canadian-born American actress and singer
- Iva Yeo (born 1939), Canadian politician
- Iva Zanicchi (born 1940), Italian pop singer and politician
- Iva Zrilić (born 2004), Croatian handball player

== Masculine name ==
Iva is also a masculine name, found in Australia and New Zealand, as well as in Georgia. Notable people with the name include:

- Iva Davies (born 1955), Australian musician, leader of the band Icehouse
- Iva Gelashvili (born 2001), Georgian football player
- Iva Pezuashvili (born 1990), Georgian writer
- Iva Ropati (born 1968), New Zealand rugby league footballer
