= James Gilmour (missionary) =

Scottish Evangelical Christian missionary

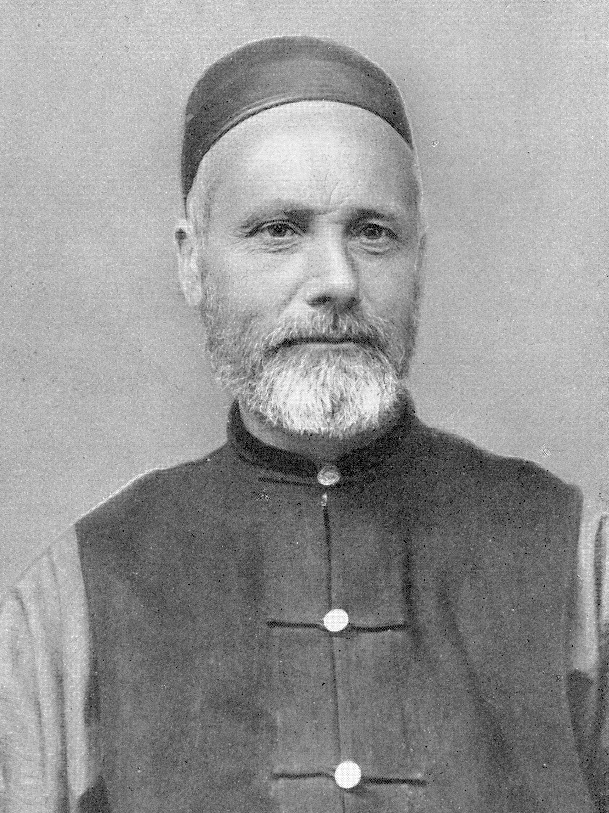
- Missionary to China and Mongolia
- Born: 12 June 1843; Cathkin, Scotland
- Died: 21 May 1891 (aged 47); Tianjin, China
- Education: University of Glasgow
- Spouse(s): Emily Gilmour (née Prankard)
- Parent(s): James Gilmour; Elizabeth Pettigrew Gilmour

James Gilmour (Chinese:景雅各; 12 June 1843 – 21 May 1891) was a Scottish Evangelical Christian missionary in China and Mongolia. He served with the London Missionary Society.

== Early life ==
James Gilmour was born at Cathkin, Scotland on 12 June 1843, the third of six sons born to James and Elizabeth Pettigrew Gilmour on the Cathkin estate of a half dozen farms in the parish of Carmunnock, about five miles from Glasgow, Scotland. His ancestors were Calvinist Christians. The grandfather Gilmour and his wife walked regularly every Sunday to Glasgow to worship in the Congregational church. Their faith made a deep impression upon the community. James' parents maintained the same strict integrity and devotion. His mother delighted in gathering her sons about her in the evening and reading to them missionary and religious stories and making comments upon them. It is supposed that here was planted the desire that led the missionary later to write his interesting accounts of his experiences. Family worship was so strictly adhered to that neighbours would have to wait until the hour was passed before they could be served. In as much as James' father was in comfortable circumstances, the lad did not pass through the ordeal of poverty that some missionaries have. He had good school privileges, first at Cambuslang and then at Glasgow, applied himself not so much because of love for learning but because he willed to do so, and earned for himself many prizes. Still he was a boy full of fun and games and noted for his teasing. He loved the wild and would wander alone among the hills, woods, and glens, delighted with nature and what it gave back to him.

== University life ==
At first when James attended University of Glasgow he lived at home. Because some of his classes came too early for train service he walked to school in the morning. Later he furnished a small house which belonged to his father in the city, and prepared his breakfast and other meals as he thought best. He was especially bright in Latin and Greek, the secret of his success being in his "unspeakable value" placed on time. He never willfully lost an hour. Though having money he was very economical. He had a horror for intoxicants. Once he called on a classmate who had beer in his room. Young Gilmour quietly raised the window and as he poured it out on the street said, "Better on God's earth than in His image." Gilmour got his bachelor's degree in 1867, and his master's degree a year later in 1868. His early religious training bore fruit in his confession of conversion to Christianity during his university life.

He selected missionary service because the workers abroad were fewer than at home, and "to me the soul of an Indian seemed as precious as the soul of an Englishman, and the Gospel as much for the Chinese as the European." He also had read the command in Matthew to "Go into all the word and preach", he thought that there was a command to preach, but it was coupled with a command to go into all the world. He didn't believe that what God had joined he could separate. He believed that God hadn't called him to stay home, so if he were to be obedient he must go. The moral effect of the brightest student deciding for missions was very great indeed. When he offered himself as a missionary to the London Missionary Society he was sent to Cheshunt Congregational Theological College (14 miles north of London) for further training. While he retained his love for fun, he studied his Bible with such great earnestness that it was said that "his soul became all aflame with love for the perishing heathen". His zeal shone brightly at home, too. He would go out evenings alone and conduct open-air preaching services or talk to labourers by the roadside or in the field about the things of Christ.

== Missionary appointment ==
After Cheshunt College, Gilmour studied a year in the society's missionary seminary at Highgate, and Chinese in London. While here, through a misunderstanding the students rebelled against the directors of the Mission Society. Gilmour spoke for the student body, was looked upon as a ringleader and with disfavour, though afterwards the directors acknowledged that the students were right in their position. On 10 February 1870 he was ordained as a missionary to Mongolia in Augustine Chapel, Edinburgh. He set sail from Liverpool, on 22 February 1870 upon the steamship Diomed. He was made chaplain of the ship on which he sailed. At night he talked to every member of the crew while on watch, and laid the matter of salvation so clearly before them that he afterwards wrote, "All on board had repeated opportunities of hearing the Gospel as plainly as I could put it."

== Arrival in China ==
James in Chinese Dress

Gilmour reached Beijing, on 18 May 1870, right away he settled down to continuing his Chinese studies. About a month later, on 22 June, news reached Beijing of a massacre. There had been a drought in the area, and the Chinese were quick to blame the missionaries for this, (they did the same thing sometime later, using a drought to gather the whole of China up in arms against the foreigners, resulting in the murder of many westerners in the Boxer Rebellion. Thirteen French Roman Catholic missionaries at Tianjin, (at that time port city of Beijing) were killed. The weeks following the massacre were very tense, and Gilmour and the older LMS missionaries weren't sure that it would be the right thing to send Gilmour to Mongolia just yet. Gilmour wrote of this time "We are all living on the slope of a volcano that may put forth its slumbering rage at any moment." Though not thinking of leaving the field, the situation was so grave that he wrote again, "Our death might further the cause of Christ more than our life could do." A massacre of all foreigners was planned, but a great downpour of rain the first day it was to begin shut the Chinese in their homes and when they could go out again the excitement was gone and there was no disturbance. By the end of July (1870) Gilmour had reached a fixed resolution to go to Mongolia as soon as the necessary arrangements had been made. He set out in the beginning of August, and reached Buryatia by mid September.

== Mongolia ==
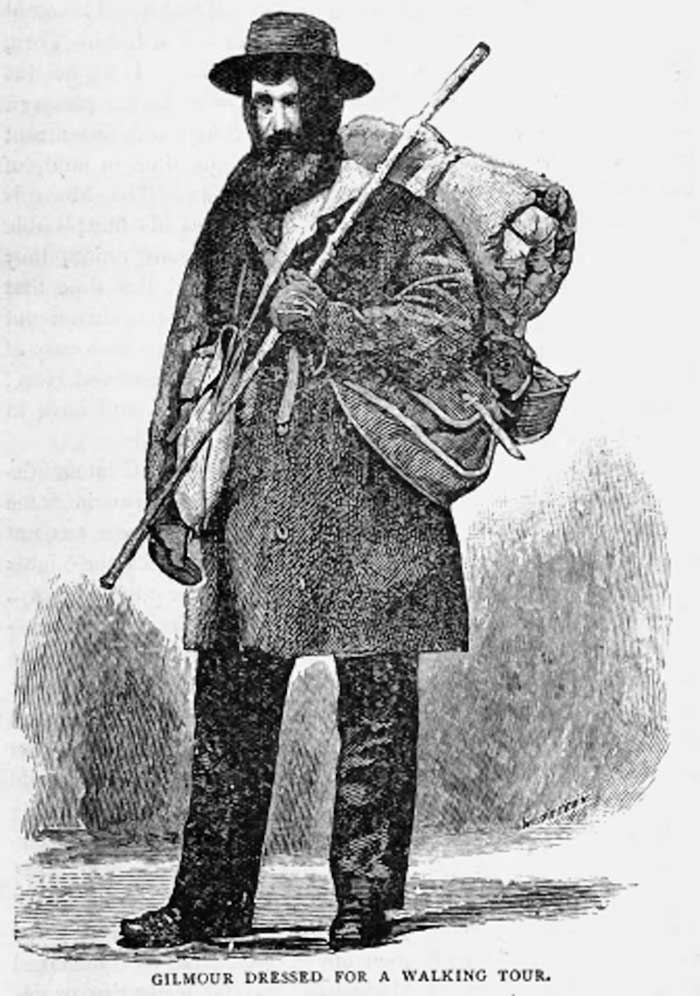
Gilmour traveling on foot

At the time Gilmour went to the field, Mongolia embraced that vast territory between China proper and Siberia, stretching from the Sea of Japan on the east to Turkestan on the west, a distance of about 3,000 miles; and from Asiatic Russia on the north to the Great Wall of China on the south, a distance of about 900 miles. In the center is the great Gobi Desert. Kalgan was over 100 miles northwest of Beijing, on the border between China and Mongolia. Still farther northwest about 900 miles is the town of Kyakhta. This route was marked by a large trade, -- exchange of China tea for salt, soda, hides and timber, -- all borne hither and thither between China and Russia by caravans of camels or oxcarts. West of this ancient caravan route were wandering tribes almost knowing no government or fearing no power. In the winter they live in rude huts or tents; during the heated summers they seek the best pastures they can command for their flocks. Terrible dust storms swept over the land. Religion, where it has gained a foothold in the southeastern part, was Buddhism; it was estimated that over half the male population were Buddhist lamas. Many temples of impressive splendour in gold and colours, seen from afar, and great reverence for sacred places by the people, impressed the missionary on every hand. To carry the Gospel to the nomadic bands of this land, Gilmour of necessity adopted a roving life and puts up with its hardships.

== Long Loneliness ==
Having decided that the proper way to learn the language and start the work was to go into the heart of the proposed field, Gilmour, in company with a Russian postmaster, left Kalgan, to which point he had come, on 27 August 1870, for the first trip across the great plain to Kyakhta. The journey took a month. Here he was detained because his passport would not be accepted by either Russian or Chinese, until he could obtain another from Beijing. He found a home with a Scotch trader. He went among the people asking the names of articles and thus gathered a vocabulary. He hired a teacher; but the teacher was so slow that the restless nature of the missionary felt life had reached its greatest stagnation. Before the close of 1870 he left Kyakhta to share the tent of some Mongol engaged in prayer. He arranged with this devout man, who had welcomed him, to share the hospitality of his home. The man lived alone, attended by two lamas that lived in adjoining huts. Here Gilmour spent three months, acquired the language rapidly and gained real insight into the hearts and minds of the natives. The cultural divide was great. To illustrate, he taught that God was everywhere and without form. The Mongol was puzzled to understand how, if God had not form, Jesus could sit at his right hand; further, if God is everywhere, how could one keep from walking on him? Within one year he could read the Bible in Mongolian slowly and at sight, and write the language imperfectly.

== The Gospel and medicine ==
During the summer of 1872 Gilmour, in company with Joseph Edkins, visited the sacred city of Wutai Shan, a famous place of Mongol pilgrimage. These people tried the zealous missionary greatly. Drunkenness, hopeless indebtedness, and a desire to borrow were characteristics that greatly disturbed him. Debts never distressed them, but rather their inability to borrow more. Amidst these discouragements he comforted himself as he once wrote, "All our good work will be found, there is no doubt of that. All I am afraid of is that our good work will amount to little when it is found!" He was concerned that in the judgment no heathen can be justified in "pitching into us for not pitching into them more savagely, for not, in fact, taking them by the cuff of the neck and dragging them into the kingdom." He endured many hardships here. He would walk to save the expense of a camel. His tent was dwelling, chapel, and dispensary. Gilmour followed the example of Jesus in healing the sick as far as he was able; and the few simple remedies he found a very great help to him in his work. Yet at the end of 1874, after four years of labour, he could not report one convert, not even one who could be classed as interested in Christianity. The people did not have even a sense of need of what the Gospel was.

== Marriage ==
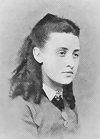
Miss Emily Prankard

In 1872 Samuel Meech, of Beijing, had married a Miss Prankard, of London. Gilmour frequented this home, and saw a picture of Miss Emily Prankard, Mrs. Meech's younger sister, hanging on the wall and heard the family speak of her frequently. In his lonely hours in the desert he had taken the matter of a suitable companion to the Lord and asked Him to send one that would help in his work. Gilmour, though he had not seen the lady or written her a line before, wrote her a letter in January, proposing marriage. Later, in the spring, he went up country and returned about July, to find he was an accepted man. He had written his parents at the time he made the proposal but that letter was delayed. Imagine their surprise when they received a letter from an unknown lady in London, telling of her engagement. Some thought he was running a great risk, but he assured them that he was at ease, for he had asked the Lord to provide. When the bride-to-be visited his parents they were much pleased and said she would suit him well. Her first glimpse of her husband was from a boat near Tianjin as he stood on a lighter coming out to meet her. He was dressed in an old overcoat and had a large woolen comforter around his neck, -- for it was cold, -- not the usual method to make a favorable impression. She landed on Thursday and the following Tuesday, 8 December 1874, they were married. He afterwards wrote, "She is a jolly girl, as much, perhaps more, of a Christian and a Christian missionary than I am."

Companionship meant much to Gilmour. Circumstances were such that their first year was spent almost entirely in Beijing. He made occasional trips to fairs at important centers, but not until 7 April 1876 did Mr. and Mrs. Gilmour take a tour into Mongolia proper. It covered a period of 156 days, during which time she picked up the language rapidly and accurately. The experience, however, was more than novel; dust storms and the continuous round of millet and mutton as food tried her greatly. While she was happy to endure for the work's sake, it was a great relief to get back to Beijing again. Gilmour turned his attention to preparing two publications, one on striking incidents from Daniel, and the other the story of salvation, both published by the Religious Tract Society for him. These vacations from the plain were decidedly necessary, for the loneliness of the desert was too great a strain to endure all the time.

James and Emily had three children: James (Jimmie), William (Willie), and Alexander (Alec or Alick) who died as a toddler.

== Encouragements ==
Once Rev. Thomas Lewis and Gilmour visited Hsiao Chang, five days distant from Tianjin. The district was famine stricken. They preached to audiences of from 130 to 300, people who were eager to learn to sing Gospel songs. Gilmour declared the service of song was a most powerful method of introducing Christ. His discourses were simple, full of illustrations from his own life, and with such earnestness and directness as gave them great force. When during the winter he was in Beijing, he would hunt out the homes of Mongols and talk with them about Jesus. He peddled the Bible and often had opportunity to read to groups that gathered about him. They came from various parts of Mongolia and thus the Gospel was sent into almost every part of the country. However, in his ability to dispense medicine was his greatest power among the natives, though many amusing requests came to him. "One man wants to be made clever, another fat, another cured of insanity, or of tobacco, or of whisky, or of hunger or tea. Most men want medicine to make their beards grow, while almost every man, woman and child wants to have his or her skin made as white as that of a foreigner." After ten years of work Gilmour was thoroughly convinced that medicine introduced him to many who would otherwise have held themselves aloof.

== Furlough ==
In 1882 the Gilmours took furlough to England. While home he published Among the Mongols. One critic wrote, "Robinson Crusoe has turned missionary, lived years in Mongolia, and wrote a book about it." While at home his main message was to pray more for the missionaries. He would not ride a car or bus on Sunday, but once walked twelve miles to hear Charles Spurgeon preach and then walked home.

== His first convert ==
At the end of 1883 Gilmours were back in Beijing. In the early part of 1884 he started out afoot without any medicine, on one of his most remarkable Mongolian journeys. The Mongols were surprised to note this foreigner, having all his belongings on his back, going about the country like their own beggar lamas. It was on this spiritual journey that he found his first convert. He was one day in a mud hut, pressing the claims of Christ upon a lama. A layman entered, stirred the fire that would not burn, and simply increased the volume of smoke in the room. So dense was the smoke that though the layman was but two yards from Gilmour he could not see him. Finally the layman said that for months he had been a learner of Jesus Christ and he was now ready to trust the Savior. The smoke had settled lower. Gilmour was lying on his back on the platform while the Mongols were crouched near the door. The missionary says of the occasion, "The place was beautiful to me as the gate of heaven, and the words of the confession of Christ from out the cloud of smoke were as inspiring to me as if they had been spoken by an angel from out the cloud of glory." Gilmour and the convert traveled for nearly twenty-three miles together, talking, and then in a lonely place in the road knelt and prayed together and then separated. This led him to the conviction that personal work was most effective, and forsaking all else, -- secular papers and books, even the bedside of his sick wife at times, -- he gave himself over to inquiries from early morning till late at night.

== Emily's death ==
Affliction finally took hold of Emily Gilmour, the disease sure of its prey, no matter how long it would be in securing it. Six weeks before the end came they talked over spiritual things, lest later she might not be able to speak of them. In simple, childlike faith, on 19 September 1885, she died and the eleven years of happy married life were brought to an end.

== Phases of his work ==
In Gilmour's view, tobacco, opium, and whiskey were the three great evils of the Mongolians and against them Gilmour presented the message of Christ. He made abstinence from all three conditions of church membership. Opposition was strong, but he stood his ground, declaring that "to leave Christians drinking whiskey and smoking tobacco would be preaching forgiveness of sin thru Christ to men who were still going on in the practice of what their consciences told them was sin." Imagine his embarrassment when he had to acknowledge to a deputation of Mongolians, favorably disposed to Christianity, who came to him to know if it were true that a certain missionary in Beijing smoked after he preached, that this was true. These men left and never returned to hear him. Still he was undaunted. Christ he would preach and leave the results with his Lord. He went afoot to save expense and was barred from decent inns because he was considered a tramp. He hired a donkey to carry his baggage, to give him respectability. An agent of the Bible Society and a native quarreled. This spread and met Gilmour everywhere he went, and people told him they did not want a religion that was not better than their own. Alone he pressed forward. He had seasons of depression and urged the church at home to pray for him, and help him by sympathy. He was willing to be all things lawful in order to "win some trophies of the cross". He became a vegetarian to win some of higher moral standards; he dressed like a shopkeeper; ate porridge, native fashion, in the street in order to win souls for Christ. His living expenses averaged about six cents per day. Some think he shortened his usefulness by such methods, but none were as capable of judging what was best as he who was on the field and understood conditions.

Upon reaching a new city he pitched his tent on a main thoroughfare, and from early morn till late at night healed the sick, preached and talked to inquirers. During one eight months' campaign he saw about 6,000 patients, preached to nearly 24,000 people, sold 3,000 books, distributed 4,500 tracts, traveled 1,860 miles and spent about $200, and added that only two individuals openly confessed to believe in Christ.

In 1888, Dr. Fred Roberts, a medical missionary, was placed to work with Gilmour providing medical care in the three mission circuit in Mongolia. Roberts, however, was called to Tianjin after several weeks in Mongolia due to the death of John Kenneth MacKenzie, the director of the Tienstin Mission Hospital and Dispensary.

Gilmour requested an assistant for his missionary work, but the Society did not provide one. When an assistant finally arrived, Gilmour was sent back to England for a break in 1889. Upon his arrival, his physical appearance had changed due to his time abroad, and his friends found him difficult to recognize. He spent this time with his sons, who had moved to England for school after their mother died. He later wrote a book titled Gilmour and His Boys about his experiences.

== Final year ==
In due time he returned to Mongolia again. He continued his work along the same lines. In April 1891 he returned to Tianjin to attend the North China District Committee of the London Missionary Society. They honored him by making him chairman and he served them well. During the time he was the guest of Dr. Roberts. Suddenly he was stricken with typhus fever of a very malignant type. He died on 21 May 1891.

== Chronology of events in Gilmour's life ==
- 1843 Born at Cathkin, Scotland, on 12 June.
- 1862 Entered University of Glasgow.
- 1867 Offered himself to London Missionary Society.
- 1869 Entered Highgate Missionary Seminar
- 1870 Ordained in Augustine Chapel, Edinburgh, on 10 February;
- Sailed from Liverpool on Diomed for Mongolia, 22 February.
- 1870 Arrived at Beijing on 18 May;
- Massacre of 13 French Catholics on 22 June;
- Journey from Beijing to Kyakhta, 5 August to 28 September.
- 1874 Married to Miss Prankard on 8 December.
- 1876 156 days' journey with wife In Mongolia, begun 7 April.
- 1882 Furlough to England, Spring to September 1883;
- Published "Among the Mongols," April.
- 1884 First convert to Christianity, 1 March.
- 1885 Mrs. Gilmour died on 19 September.
- 1886 Two oldest children went to England on 23 March.
- 1889 Second furlough to England, 4 April to 14 May 1890.
- 1891 Died in Tianjin on 21 May.

== See also ==
- Christianity in Mongolia

== Bibliography ==
- H. P. Beach, Princely Men in the Heavenly Kingdom (1903), pp. 77–106
- Kathleen L. Lodwick, "For God and Queen: James Gilmour Among the Mongols, 1870-1891", Social Sciences and Missions (Leiden: Brill), vol.22, no.2, 2008, pp. 144–172
- Richard Lovett, James Gilmour of Mongolia: His Diaries, Letters, and Reports (1892)
- Richard Lovett, James Gilmour and His Boys, London:Religious Tract Society, (1894).
- Richard Lovett, More About the Mongols (1893)
- Richard Lovett, Among the Mongols, London : Religious Tract Society,(1883)
- W. P. Nairne, Gilmour of the Mongols, London, Hodder and Stoughton (1924)
- Temur Temule, "Rediscovering the Mongols, James Gilmour as a Transculturator", in Gaba Bamana, ed., Christianity and Mongolia: Past and Present (Ulaanbaatar: Antoon Mostaert Center, 2006), 54–59.
