= Isabella Fisher Hospital =

Hospital in Tianjin, China

Isabella Fisher Hospital (伊塞貝勒醫院; also Hospital for Women and Children, Tientsin) was located in Tianjin, China. Built in 1881 and opened in 1882, it was founded by the Methodist Episcopal Church (South).

== History ==
Leonara Howard King, M.D., was in charge of a small hospital for women in Beijing at the time of the serious illness of Lady Li, the wife Li Hongzhang, Viceroy of Zhili. At Dr. John Kenneth MacKenzie's suggestion, she was invited to visit Tianjin by Li Hongzhang, in order to make an examination which was deemed important by the European local surgeons, but which Chinese etiquette forbade their undertaking. The result was in all respects satisfactory, and Howard continued to act with Drs. Mackenzie and Irwin until the patient's complete recovery. Lady Li became attached to Howard, and protested against her return to the capital. Friends in Tianjin urged her to take advantage of the opportunity. She yielded, despite the adverse judgment of most of the members of her own mission; but she has had the satisfaction since of finding all approve her course, and of seeing her former sphere occupied by a suitable successor.

Shortly after this the Viceroy placed 200 taels (£60) per month at Dr. Mackenzie's disposal for medical work; and Lady Li shortly followed suit by giving Howard 100 taels per month for work among other women. From the first, medicines were dispensed both to men and women at a large temple, some four miles distant from the missions. But it was impossible to deal with serious surgical cases at such a distance. Hospital buildings, with wards for inpatients near at hand, became a necessity. Armed with an official imprimatur, and encouraged by promise of help from the Viceroy if needful, a subscription list was opened, and, as the result, the London Missionary Society built a well-equipped hospital, the Tientsin Mission Hospital and Dispensary, (under the care of Dr. Mackenzie, and brought to regional prominence by his successor Dr. Fred C. Roberts), with wards for about 40 in-patients, and a medical school attached, the money value of which is about 5,000 taels (£1,500), besides an already considerable endowment fund—the whole of which has come from native sources. But this course was not open to Americans. It was hardly feasible to have two such subscription lists going at once. Besides local public opinion would hardly favor a hospital for women. Just at this time, an American (the Rev. John Goucher of Baltimore), having money which he wished to use in the work, wrote to the Tianjin Committee of the Methodist Episcopal Mission, offering a sum for an orphanage, if desired. The reply was that the present need of the station was for an hospital for women. At once the gentleman wrote, undertaking to bear the entire expense of the erection and furnishing of suitable buildings.

== Bibliography ==
- Foster, Arnold (1889). Christian Progress in China: Gleanings from the Writings and Speeches of Many Workers (Public domain ed.). Religious Tract Society. p. 189.
