= St Stephen's Hospital =

Several organisations are named St. Stephen's Hospital or St. Steven's Hospital:

- St. Stephen's Hospital in Beijing (Chinese: 永清圣司提反医院), China
- St. Stephen's Hospital, Cork, a psychiatric hospital in Ireland
- St. Stephen's Hospital, Delhi, a private hospital in India since 1885
- St. Stephen's Hospital, London, a general hospital in the United Kingdom, 1876–1989, on the site of Chelsea and Westminster hospital, which superseded it
