= China Medical University =

China Medical University may refer to:

- China Medical University (Liaoning) (中国医科大学), in Shenyang, Liaoning, China
- China Medical University (Taiwan) (中國醫藥大學), in Taichung, Taiwan
