= Dugald Christie (missionary) =

Scottish missionary (1855–1936)

Dugald Christie CMG
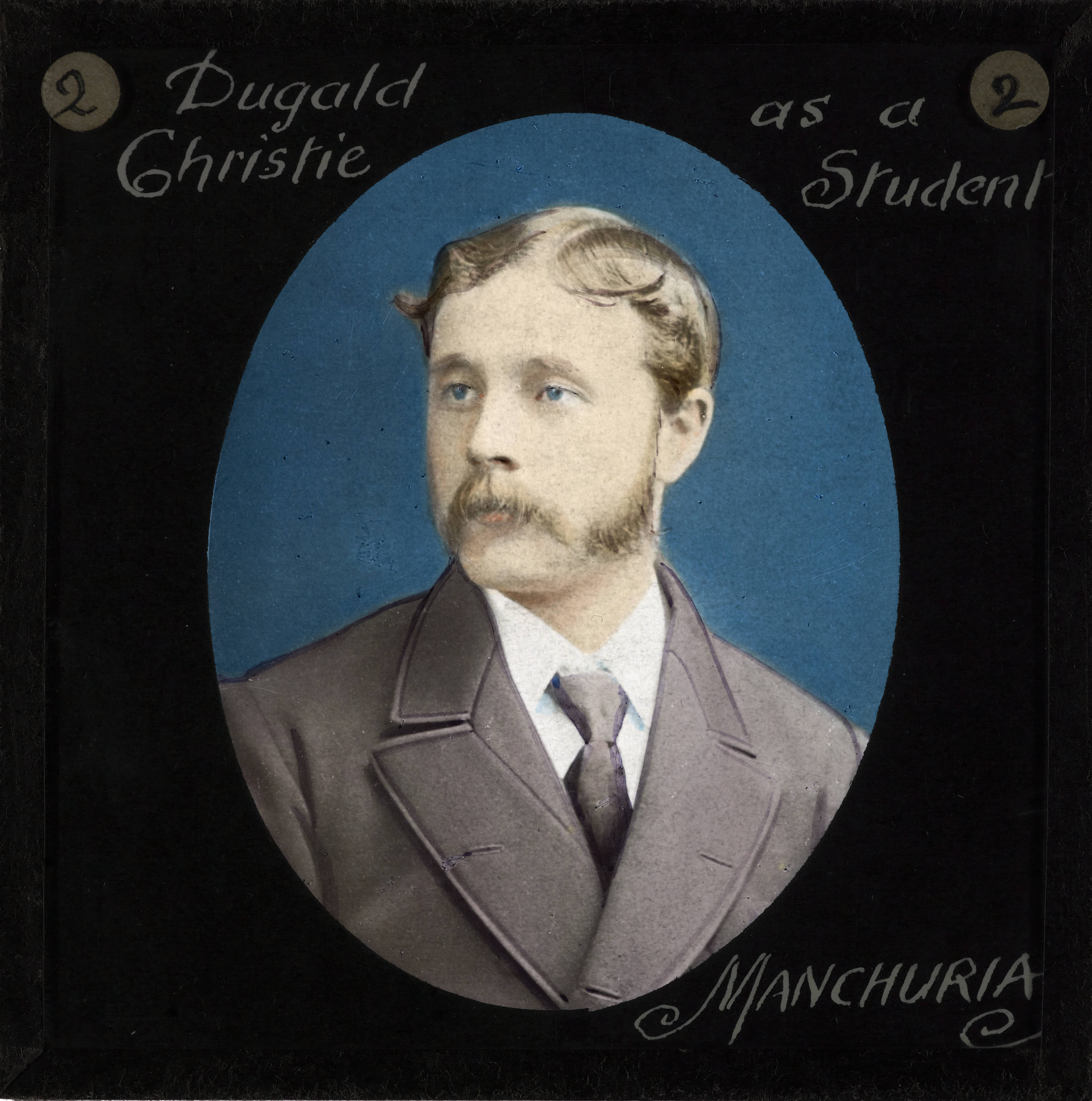
- Dugald Christie as a Student, ca. 1880
- Born: 11 November 1855; Glencoe, Highland
- Died: 2 December 1936 (aged 81); Edinburgh
- Education: Royal College of Physicians of Edinburgh; Royal College of Surgeons of Edinburgh
- Occupation: Medical missionary

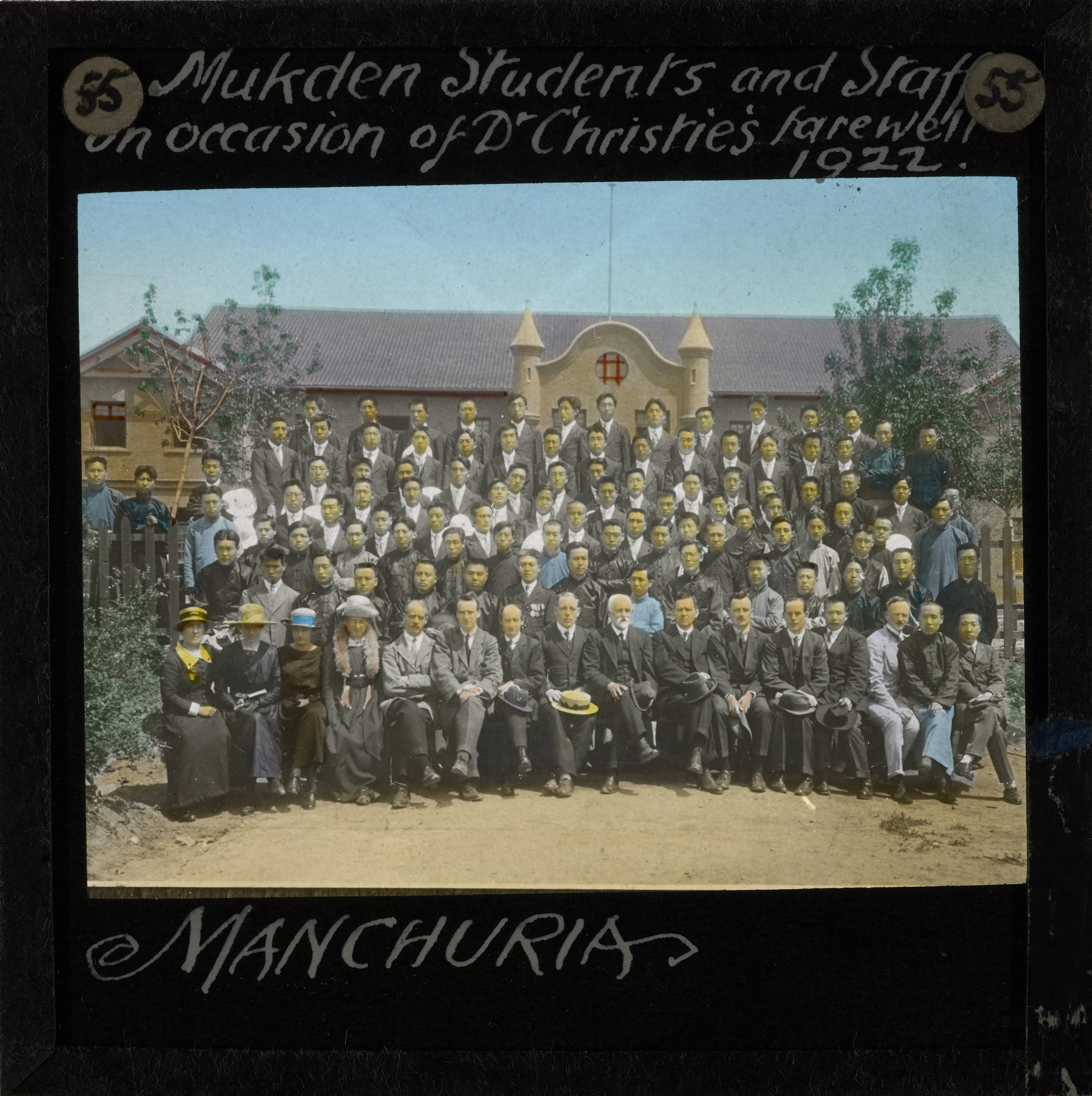
Mukden College: students and staff (Christie is in front row sitting next to the women)

Rev Dugald Christie CMG (11 November 1855 – 2 December 1936) was a Scottish missionary active in China, and a founder of the Shengjing Clinic and Mukden Medical College in Mukden.

== Life ==
Christie was born in Glencoe in Scotland on 11 November 1855.

He received qualifications in both medicine and surgery from the Royal College of Physicians of Edinburgh and the Royal College of Surgeons of Edinburgh (LRCPE LRCSEd 1881). In 1882 he was sent to Mukden (now Shenyang) in northeastern China as a medical missionary and opened the Shengjing Clinic. For the next 30 years Christie ran the clinic and worked towards opening a full medical school; with funds from Scottish and Irish presbyterian churches, the Chinese government and local people, the clinic became a (teaching) hospital and in March 1912 Christie became the first Principal of the Mukden Medical College. This was the first foreign medical college to be opened in northeastern China.

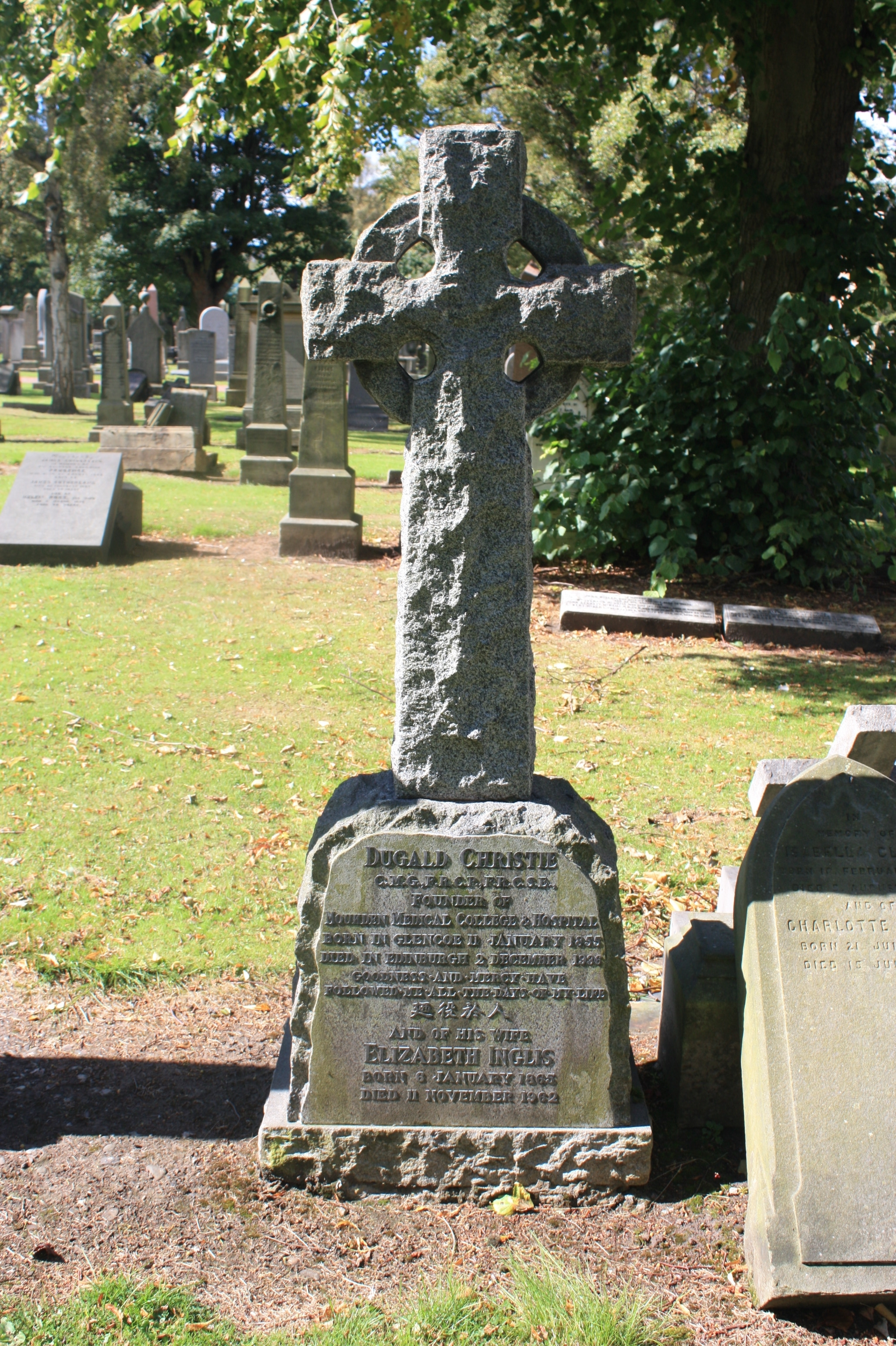
Dugald Christie's grave, Grange Cemetery

Christie retired in 1923 and died in Edinburgh on 2 December 1936. He is buried with his second wife, Elizabeth Inglis (1855–1952), in the north-east section of the Grange Cemetery. His daughter May Christie (1890–1946) became a journalist and fiction writer.

== The hospital ==
The hospital continued as the MMC's teaching hospital until MMC was absorbed by the China Medical University in 1949 when it became one of that university's hospitals and was renamed the 2nd Affiliated Hospital. In 1969 the hospital was relocated to Chaoyang as part of the plan to bring medical care to rural areas but moved back to Shenyang in 1983.

In 2002 the hospital absorbed the 3rd Affiliated Hospital and in 2003, on its 120th anniversary, restored its name as Sheng Jing Hospital.

== Works ==
- Christie, Dugald (1895). Ten Years in Manchuria: A Story of Medical Mission Work in Moukden, 1883-1893. J. and R. Parlane.
- Christie, Dugald (1914). Thirty Years in the Manchu Capital in and Around Moukden in Peace and War: Being the Recollections of Dugald Christie. London: McBride, Nast & Company.
- Christie, Dugald (1914). Thirty Years in Moukden, 1883–1913: Being the Experiences and Recollections of Dugald Christie. London: Constable & Company.
