= Borden Memorial Hospital =

Borden Memorial Hospital 博德恩医院
- China Inland Mission

Geography
- Location: Lanzhou, Gansu, China
- Coordinates: 36.062124°N 103.812497°E

Organisation
- Type: Specialist
- Religious affiliation: Christian

Services
- Beds: 120
- Speciality: Leprosy

History
- Opened: 1918
- Closed: 1951

Links
- Lists: Hospitals in China

Borden Memorial Hospital was a hospital in Lanzhou, Gansu, China from 1918 to 1951. It was founded by the China Inland Mission (CIM) with money donated by the Borden family after the death of William Whiting Borden. Borden had meant to come to China as a missionary, but died in Cairo, Egypt while studying Arabic to prepare himself to serve the Muslims of China. The hospital was handed over to the Chinese government in 1951.

== History ==
The hospital was completed on 9 April 1918 as the first hospital in Gansu. It was a predecessor to the Second People's Hospital of Lanzhou, which took over the hospital in 1951.

In this hospital was an outdoor corridor lined with pictures of Chinese patients helped by all the missionary doctors. The words: "For God so love the World in Chinese still hangs over the corridor."

In 1943 the independent missionary Gladys Aylward stayed for a short while with Dr Hoyte and his wife, at their invitation, while recuperating from the trauma and exhaustion of her escape over the mountains with 100s of children from Tsechow to Xi'an to escape the Japanese army. Her biographer, Phyllis Thompson, describes the hospital at that time as being "on a barren hillside on the banks of the Yellow River, opposite the great walled city. The hospital was a centre of healing to which people travelled sometimes for hundreds of miles. It sprawled along the hillside above the road that led to Central Asia, along which strings of camels and heavilly laden lorries headed for the deserts. … Passing in and out through the hospital gates were men and women whose faces bore the unmistakeable marks of leprosy. There was plenty to be done, there in the hospital and in the leprosarium, and everybody on the big compound was busy."

The hospital was handed over to the Chinese government in 1951. In 1970, it became the Lanzhou Infectious Disease Hospital and in 1978 it was renamed the Lanzhou Second People's Hospital.

== CIM Hospital staff ==
- Dr & Mrs Hoyte doctor (1930s-1945)
- Mary Weightman Nurse in Charge (1934-?)
- Isabella Marion Davidson Nurse
- Otto F. Schoerner Business Manager (1948-1951)

== See also ==
- List of Christian Hospitals in China
- Photo of Borden Hospital in the collection of Rev Claude Pickens Jr.
- Ian Ferguson's visit to Borden Memorial Hospital where his grandfather worked
- Asia Harvest article on the hospital's influence on Tibetans
