= May Christie =

British-American writer and journalist (1890–1946)

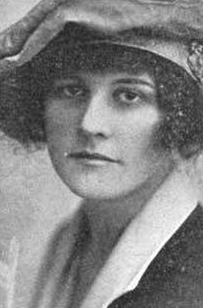
- May Christie, from a 1922 publication.
- Born: Elizabeth May Christie; October 3, 1890; China
- Died: February 16, 1946 (aged 55); Los Angeles, California
- Other name: May Christie Mazzavini (after second marriage)
- Occupation: writer

May Christie (October 3, 1890 – February 16, 1946) was a British-American writer and journalist, born in China to Scottish parents.

== Early life ==
Elizabeth May Christie was born in China, the daughter of Dugald Christie and Elizabeth Hastie Smith. Her father was a medical missionary at Mukden (now Shenyang). She was raised in Scotland and attended the University of Edinburgh, where she earned a master's degree in English literature.

== Career ==
Christie's fiction included romance novels, short stories, and serials for magazines. Among her longform works were Helene's Married Life, The Marriage of Anne, (1920) Love's Gamble (1920), For Love of Betty (1921), The Eternal Eve (1923), The Rebel Bride (1925), The Gilded Rose (1925), The Garden of Desire (1926), Eager Love (1928), Man Madness (1929), The Jazz Widow (1930), A Kiss for Corinna (1930), Love's Miracle (1930), Flirting Wives (1931), Tomorrow Will Be Lovely (1936), Women in Love (1938), Honeymoon Preferred (1940), and That Man is Mine (1942).

In 1915 Christie was woman's page editor for the Philadelphia Evening Ledger. During World War I she became a London-based war correspondent for the McClure Newspaper Syndicate. After the war, she carried Kaiser Wilhelm's typewritten memoirs to the United States for publication, and wrote features for the New York Evening World. She was admitted to the New York Newspaper Women's Club in 1922.

Christie moved to California to write for the film industry. She wrote the English subtitles for an Italian film comedy, Amo te sola (I Love You Only, 1936).

== Personal life ==
May Christie married Alexander Elsden Martin, a captain in the British army, in 1920. She married John Mazzavini, a stockbroker, in 1927. She died by suicide in 1946, aged 55, in Los Angeles, California.
