= Woolston Memorial Hospital =

Geography
- Location: Fuzhou, Fujian, China

Organisation
- Care system: Western Medicine
- Type: Teaching

History
- Opened: 19th century

Links
- Lists: Hospitals in China

Woolston Memorial Hospital
- Traditional Chinese: 媧氏紀念醫院
- Simplified Chinese: 娲氏纪念医院
Transcriptions
Standard Mandarin
- Hanyu Pinyin: Wāshì jìniàn yīyuàn
- Wade–Giles: Wa^{1}shih^{4} chi^{4}nien^{4} i^{1}yüan^{4}
Yue: Cantonese
- Jyutping: Wo^{1}si^{6} gei^{2}nim^{6} ji^{1}jyun^{2}
Eastern Min
- Fuzhou BUC: Ua^{1}-sei^{5} gi^{3}-naing^{5} i^{1}-ieng^{5}

和新田婦幼醫院
- Simplified Chinese: 和新田妇幼医院
Transcriptions
Standard Mandarin
- Hanyu Pinyin: Héxīntián fùyòu yīyuàn
- Wade–Giles: Ho^{2}hsin^{1}t'ien^{2} fu^{4}yu^{4} i^{1}yüan^{4}
Yue: Cantonese
- Jyutping: Wo^{4}san^{1}tin^{4} fu^{5}jau^{3} ji^{1}jyun^{2}
Eastern Min
- Fuzhou BUC: Huo^{5}-sing^{1}-dieng^{2} hou^{5}-iu^{4} i^{1}-ieng^{5}

The Woolston Memorial Hospital was a Christian hospital in China and the first of its kind in Fuzhou.

== History ==
The Woolston Memorial Hospital was formed from the expansion of a small Fuzhounese clinic run by a Methodist missionary within the walled city. It was located near Crow Pagoda Park in Gulou (26.077178°N 119.300441°E). Originally, the hospital only accepted members of Christian churches to study on the medical course, however this rule was lifted in 1906 and a standard exam was put in place. Of the four girls to pass the exam in 1906, three were not Christian.

In 1907, the head physician was forced to rest due to serious illness and it was suggested that the hospital should be closed. However, the physicians sister insisted that the hospital remain open for the public and its reputation slowly recovered under her management.

As a Christian hospital, the Woolston held regular services and sought to convert its patients and visitors. A report made to the Foochow Woman's Conference of the Methodist Episcopal Church in 1915 records 30 new baptisms, 20 new full church members, and a total of 1,252 women who had been taken to the nearby church. The staff also campaigned against foot-binding and made an annual report of the number of women who had been persuaded to unbind their feet.

In January 1927, thieves broke into the hospital and set fire to it. The entire building was burnt down.

A Woolston Memorial Dispensary opened in 1930 in Longtian village (Chinese: 龙田镇) and at the Lucie F. Harrison Hospital, both in neighbouring Fuqing.

== Capacity ==
The table below shows the number of in-patients and home-visits attended by Woolston hospital staff over 16 years of Hü King Eng's management.

Year	In-patients	Patients visited in homes	Dispensary patients	Receipts
1899	358	425	1,837	$155.79
1903	902	1,080	12,929	$830.64
1913	-	-	-	$3,383.59
1914	-	-	-	$3,655.12
1915	114	812	18,512	$3,655.12

== Notable staff ==
- Hü King Eng
- Hü Seuk Eng (Chinese: 許淑訇), younger sister of Hü King Eng and one of the first local Fuzhounese to train at Woolston
