= William Whiting Borden =

American missionary

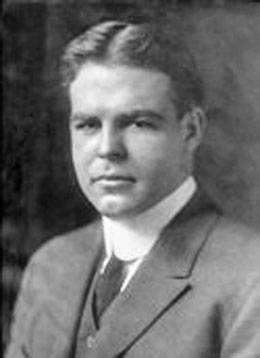
William Borden

William Whiting Borden (November 1, 1887 – April 9, 1913) was an American philanthropist and millionaire Christian missionary candidate who died in Egypt before reaching his chosen field, Gansu province in China.

== Life and work ==
=== Childhood and youth ===
William Whiting Borden was born into a prominent and wealthy Illinois family, the third child of William and Mary DeGarmo Whiting Borden. Borden's father had made a fortune in Colorado silver mining, but the family was unrelated to the Gail Borden family of condensed milk fame.

Borden had three siblings: John (1884-1961), Joyce (1897-1971), and novelist and poet Mary Borden (1886-1968).

After his mother converted to evangelical Christianity in 1894, she took Borden to Chicago Avenue Church, later Moody Church, where he responded to the gospel preaching of R. A. Torrey. From that juncture, prayer and Bible study became hallmarks of his life. After he graduated from The Hill School, Pottstown, Pennsylvania, at age 16, his parents gave him the gift of a chaperoned trip around the world, during which he first developed a desire to become a foreign missionary. In London, once again under the preaching of Torrey who was holding meetings there, Borden surrendered his life for Christian service.

=== Yale ===
Borden entered Yale University in 1905, and with the encouragement of young classics tutor Henry Burt Wright, Borden began daily prayer groups that within two years reached the entire university from the freshman class to the senior. At a 1906 Student Volunteer Movement convention in Nashville, Samuel Marinus Zwemer, "a man with a map," impressed Borden with his emphasis on the open doors for evangelizing the Muslim world.

Borden had a charismatic personality, was sociable, athletic, and fun loving but also was an intense and hardworking natural leader. At Yale, he was elected president of Phi Beta Kappa and was active in several collegiate sports, especially wrestling and crew. He also became the master of his own sailing yacht. Borden refused to join a fraternity fearing "it might set him apart from the body of the class," but he was elected to the Elihu society. Though an opponent of liberal Christianity, Borden was ecumenical in spirit. With his own money, he funded a New Haven rescue mission and there did personal work himself. One well-traveled English visitor, when asked what had most impressed him about America, is said to have replied, "The sight of that young millionaire kneeling with his arm around a 'bum' in the Yale Hope Mission."

=== Brief career ===
After graduating from Yale in 1909, Borden attended Princeton Theological Seminary before graduating in 1912. Professor Charles R. Erdman wrote that no other student had exerted a greater personal influence over him than Borden. "His judgment was so unerring and so mature that I always forgot there was such a difference in our ages. His complete consecration and devotion to Christ were a revelation to me, and his confidence in prayer a continual inspiration." Meanwhile, Borden's reputation was such that he became a board member of the National Bible Institute in New York City and at one point temporarily took charge of the whole ministry, including office management, oversight of student practical training, and the operations of four rescue missions. He also became a director of Moody Bible Institute and, at age 22, a member of the North American Council of the China Inland Mission. (He was asked to withdraw from the meeting when the council officially passed on his own fitness to become a probationer of the Mission.)

Borden's intention was to become a missionary to Hui Muslims in northwestern China's Gansu Province, but he decided first to study Islam and Arabic in Cairo, boarding with a Syrian family there so that he would hear Arabic spoken as much as possible. He also spent time distributing on the streets Christian sermons written in a Koranic style.

In March 1913 he contracted cerebral meningitis, exhibiting symptoms on March 21 and dying less than three weeks later. He was 25. Ironically, his mother had just arrived from America to vacation with him in the mountains of Lebanon, and she was present for the simple funeral in which Samuel Zwemer participated. Borden is buried in the American Cemetery in Cairo. On his grave were inscribed words suggested by Charles Erdman: "Apart from faith in Christ, there is no explanation of such a life." Memorial services were conducted for Borden at Princeton University and at a little African Methodist church where Borden had taught Sunday school for two years. Other services were held at Yale Hope Mission, at Moody Church, at Marble Collegiate Church in New York, and in Japan, Korea, India and South Africa.

Borden bequeathed $800,000 to the China Inland Mission and other Christian agencies. China Inland Mission named Borden Memorial Hospital in Lanzhou, Gansu, in his memory.

== Apocryphal anecdote ==
According to an oft-repeated anecdote, following Borden's death, his mother found in his Bible the words "No Reserve" and a date suggesting it had been written shortly after he had renounced his fortune in favor of missions. Later he was said to have written "No Retreat," after his father supposedly told him that he would never hold a position in the family business. Finally, shortly before he died in Egypt, he is supposed to have added the phrase "No Regrets." There is no evidence for the historicity of this anecdote. If Borden ever wrote those words in a Bible, the Bible has not been discovered.
