= Richard Lovett (writer) =

English minister and author

Richard Lovett (5 January 1851 – 29 December 1904) was an English minister in the Countess of Huntingdon's Connexion and author.

== Life ==
The son of Richard Deacon Lovett and Annie Godart his wife, he was born at Croydon on 5 January 1851. Nine years of boyhood (1858–67) were spent with his parents at Brooklyn in the United States. Leaving school there at an early age, he was employed by a New York publisher. In 1867 he returned to England, and in 1869 entered Cheshunt College, the president of which, Dr. Henry Robert Reynolds, became a significant influence on him. He graduated B.A. with honours in philosophy at London University in 1873, and proceeded M.A. in 1874, when he left Cheshunt and was ordained to the ministry of the Countess of Huntingdon's connexion. He began ministerial work at Bishop's Stortford, also acting as assistant master at the school there.

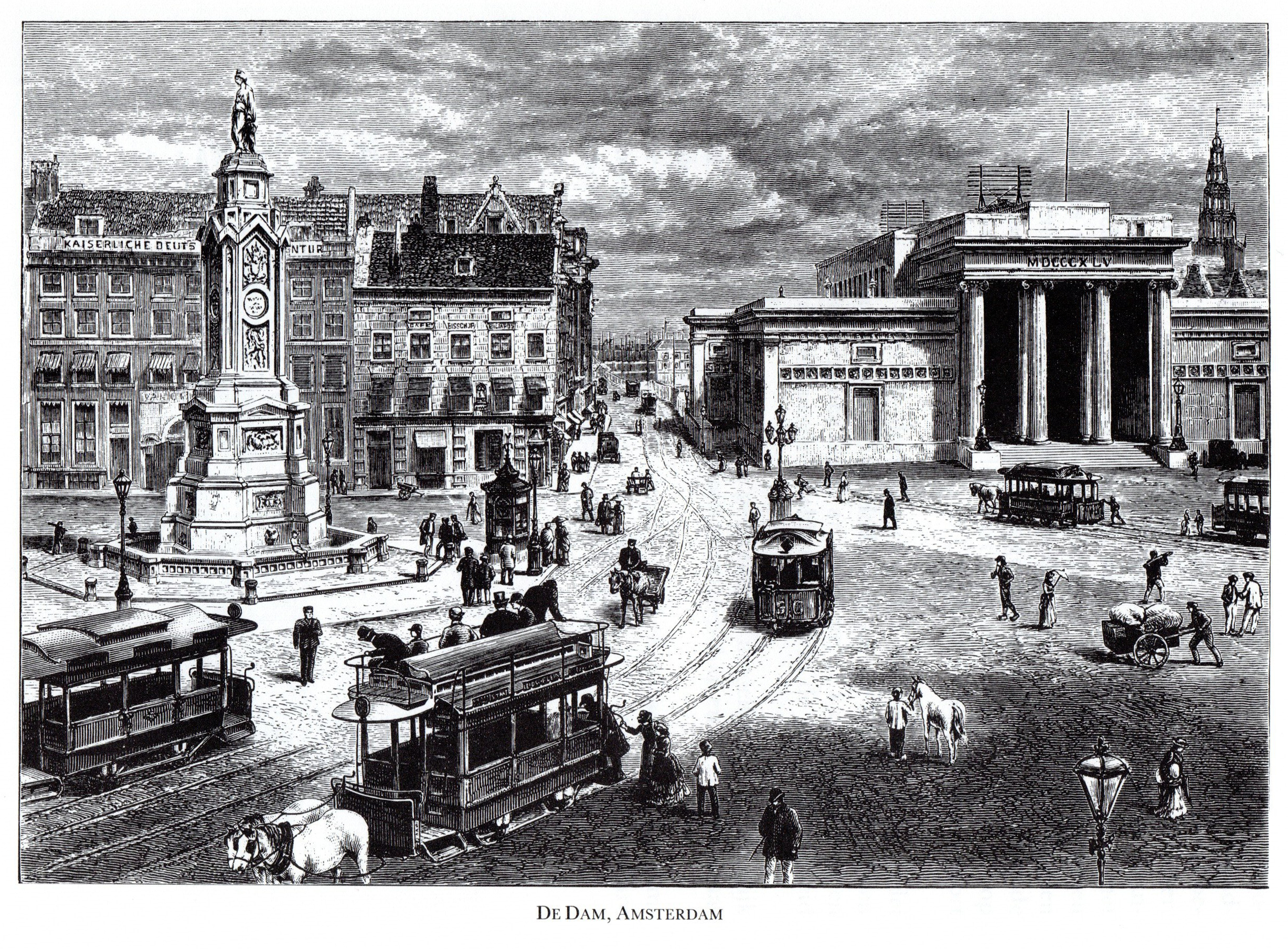
Dam Square, Amsterdam, the Netherlands (Pictures from Holland 1887) by Richard Lovett

In 1876 Lovett accepted an independent charge as minister of the Countess of Huntingdon church at Rochdale. In 1882 he changed direction, and was appointed book editor of the Religious Tract Society. He then became a director of the London Missionary Society. Interest in missionary work brought him into close touch with James Chalmers (New Guinea) and James Gilmour (Mongolia), both of whose lives he wrote. He revisited the United States as a delegate to the ecumenical missionary conference of 1900.

Lovett formed for himself a collection of early English Bibles and kindred works, which was dispersed after his death. In 1899, on the retirement of Samuel Gosnell Green, Lovett became one of the secretaries of the Religious Tract Society, charged with the Society's continental interests, while retaining much of his former work as book editor. Towards the end of his life the affairs of Cheshunt College, of which he acted as honorary secretary, troubled him, and he was among the early workers for the reconstitution of the Congregational Union.

Lovett died suddenly of heart failure at Clapham, London, on 29 December 1904.

== Works ==
Lovett was a prolific author, particularly in periodicals. His main books were:

- Norwegian Pictures (1885);
- Pictures from Holland (1887);
- Irish Pictures (1888);
- London Pictures (1890);
- United States Pictures (1891);
- James Gilmour of Mongolia (1892);
- The Printed English Bible (1895);
- The History of the London Missionary Society (1899), for the LMS centenary;
- The English Bible in the John Rylands Library (1899);
- James Chalmers (1902); and
- Tamate: the Life of James Chalmers for Boys (1903).

== Family ==
He married on 29 April 1879 Annie Hancock, daughter of William Reynolds of Torquay, who, with one son and two daughters, survived him.
