= Iva Mabelle Miller =

American physician and missionary (1880–1951)

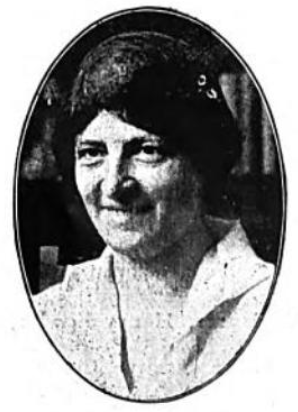
- Iva Mabelle Miller, from a 1926 publication
- Born: June 15, 1880; LaSalle County, Illinois, U.S.
- Died: December 5, 1951 (age 71); Indianapolis, Indiana, U.S.
- Occupations: Physician, medical missionary in China

Iva Mabelle Miller (June 15, 1880 – December 5, 1951) was an American physician and medical missionary in China. She was medical director of a hospital in Tianjin (Tientsin) from 1909 to 1923, and later worked on health education and public health projects, in China and in the United States.

== Early life and education ==
Miller was born in LaSalle County, Illinois, the daughter of Frederick Lee Miller and Lorena Sprague Miller. She graduated from Wesleyan University and trained as a physician at the Chicago College of Medicine and Surgery (1906). During a furlough in 1924, she studied at Johns Hopkins School of Hygiene and Public Health. Her twin brother Ira also became a physician.

== Career ==
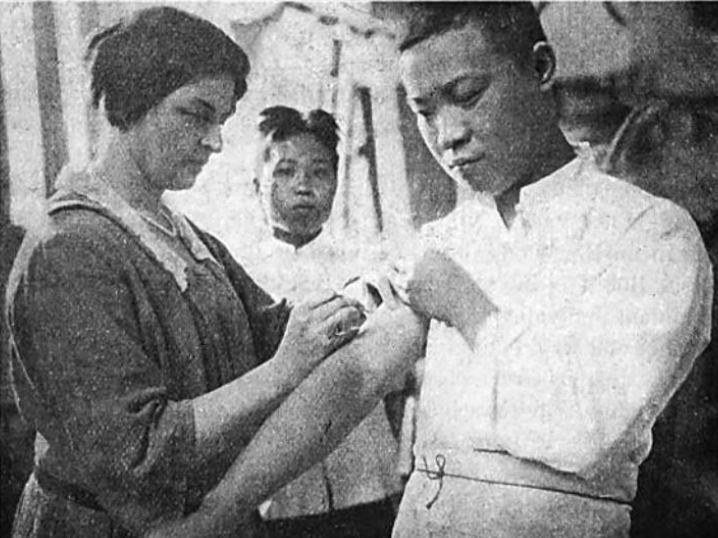
Iva M. Miller administering a vaccination to a Chinese man, from a 1926 publication

Miller interned at the Frances Willard National Temperance Hospital in Chicago, and was a resident at the Methodist Deacon Hospital in Spokane, Washington. She went to China in 1909, as a medical missionary under the auspices of the Methodist Episcopal Church. She was director of the Isabella Fisher Hospital at Tianjin until 1923; in her last years in China, she worked in the School Hygiene department of the Council on Health Education in Shanghai, and was acting director of the council in 1928. "Health is positive! It is courage, hope, joy and achievement!" she wrote of her work in 1928. "The World War has taught us that the future of world civilization lies in the preservation of the child life of the world."

Miller spoke about her work in China to American audiences, during furloughs in the United States in 1915 and in 1922. From 1932 to 1934 she was director of the Child Health Demonstration of Harlan County, Kentucky, a program sponsored by the International Save the Children Fund of America. She also spoke to professional and community groups about child health topics. She moved to New York in 1934, where she was assistant to the director of the American Women's Hospitals, a charity that supported medical facilities for women and children in several Southern states.

In 1947 Miller opened a practice in Indianapolis, specializing in arthritis and phlebitis care. She was a member of the Business and Professional Women's Club.

== Publications ==
- "Medical Work in Tientsin" (1917)
- "The Health of the School Child" (1925)
- "Health Education in China" (1925)
- "Beginnings of Health Education in China" (1926)
- "A Health Campaign in South China" (!928)
- "Amoy Seeks Health" (1928)

== Personal life and legacy ==
Miller died in 1951, at the age of 71, in Indianapolis, Indiana. Ninety of her photographs from Tianjin are in the Hoover Institution Library and Archives at Stanford University.
