= Roberts Memorial Hospital =

Mission hospital in China

Roberts Memorial Hospital was a mission hospital established by the London Missionary Society in T'sangchou, China in 1903.

The hospital was supposed to open in 1899, but it sustained damage during the Boxer Rebellion.

It was named after Dr. Fred C. Roberts, a London Missionary Society missionary who led the Tientsin Mission Hospital and Dispensary 1888 until his death in 1894. Brothers and medical missionaries Dr. Arthur Davies Peill and Dr. Sidney George Peill were among the hospitals first staff members.
