= Iva Grbas =

Croatian basketball player

Personal information
- Born: December 29, 1987 (age 38) Rijeka, SFR Yugoslavia
- Listed height: 1.88 m (6 ft 2 in)

Career information
- WNBA draft: 2009: undrafted
- Playing career: –2015
- Position: Power forward / center

Career history
- 2010–2011: Novi Zagreb
- 2011–2012: Reims Basket Féminin
- 2012–2013: Limoges ABC
- 2013–2014: Libertas Trogylos Basket
- 2014–2015: NB Oberhausen

Iva Grbas (born 29 December 1987 in Rijeka, SFR Yugoslavia) is a Croatian professional basketball player.
