= Hü King Eng =

Chinese doctor (1865–1929)

Hü King Eng, M.D.
- 許金訇
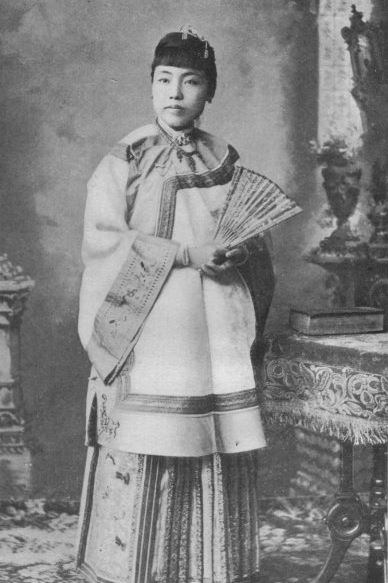
- Hü King Eng on graduation from the Woman's Medical College of Philadelphia in 1894.
- Born: 1865; Fuzhou, Fujian, Qing China
- Died: 1929 (aged 63–64); Serangoon, Singapore
- Other name: He Jingying (何金英)
- Education: Ohio Wesleyan University
- Occupation: Physician

Hü King Eng
- Traditional Chinese: 許金訇
- Simplified Chinese: 许金訇
Transcriptions
Standard Mandarin
- Hanyu Pinyin: Xǔ Jīnhōng
- Bopomofo: ㄒㄩ˙ㄐㄧㄣ˙ㄏㄨㄥ˙
- Wade–Giles: Hsu Chin-hung
Yue: Cantonese
- Jyutping: Heoi^{2} Gam^{1}-gwang^{1}
Eastern Min
- Fuzhou BUC: Hṳ̄ Gĭnghŏng

He Jingying
- Traditional Chinese: 何金英
- Simplified Chinese: 何金英
Transcriptions
Standard Mandarin
- Hanyu Pinyin: Hé Jīnyīng
- Bopomofo: ㄏㄜˊ ㄐㄧㄣㄧㄥ
- Wade–Giles: Ho^{2} Chin^{1}-ying^{1}
Yue: Cantonese
- Jyutping: Ho^{4} Gam^{1}-jing^{1}
Eastern Min
- Fuzhou BUC: Hō Gĭng-ĭng

Hü King Eng (Chinese: 許金訇; pinyin: Xǔ Jīnhōng, Foochow Romanized: Hṳ̄ Gĭnghŏng) was a physician, and the second ethnic Chinese woman to attend university in the United States, after King You Mé. Her medical career is well-documented, as she was treated as a celebrity by American media, due to the lack of even American women studying medicine at the time.

== Early life ==
Hü was born to a Chinese Christian family in Fuzhou. Her father's family had been military bureaucrats and had practised Buddhism, but Hü's father converted to Christianity in the 1870s, later becoming a minister of the Methodist Episcopal Church. Hü's mother joined her husband in spreading the gospel and travelled with him to various impoverished areas near Fuzhou. Lady Hü was a friend of Sarah Moore, the wife of the missionary Nathan Sites, who recorded that she endured much persecution as the wife of a minister, but was instrumental in preaching to female visitors interested in Christianity. The family had several daughters, one of whom died only months before Hü was born in 1865.

In accordance with contemporary fashions, Hü's feet were bound to make them smaller. During the process, her father decided that foot binding was unnatural and removed the bandages. When he left on a trip, Lady Hü reapplied the bandages, but removed them once again when Hü's father returned. Later, Hü visited a relative, who bound her feet again, but Lady Hü made her take the bandages off when she returned home. Hü argued that she was ashamed of her large feet that everyone ridiculed, but Lady Hü responded, "tell them bound-footed girls never enter the emperor's palace."

== Education ==
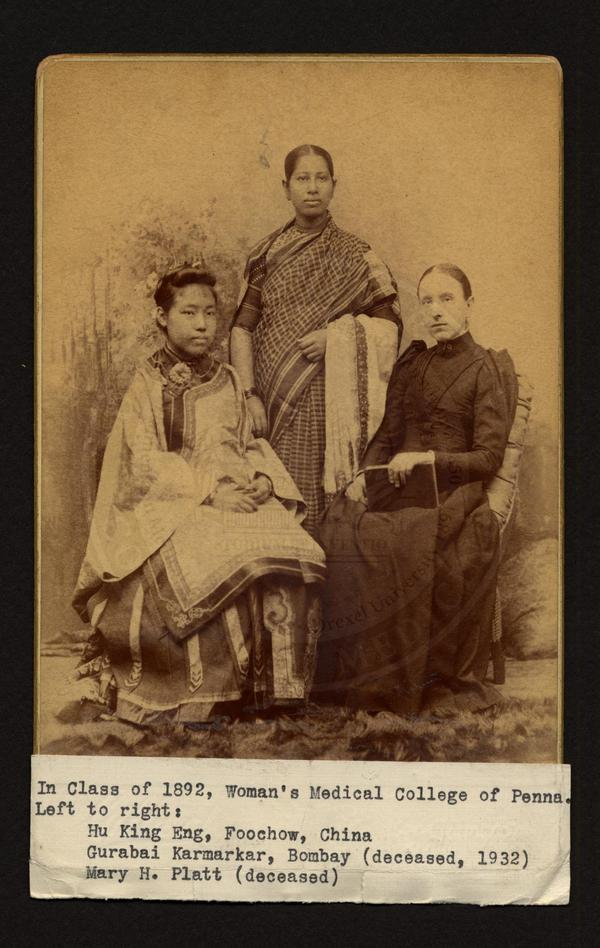
Gurubai Karmarkar, Hü, and Mary H. Platt, members of the Class of 1892 at the Woman's Medical College of Pennsylvania

Hü attended the Fuzhou Boarding School for Girls, which was run under the auspices of Woman's Foreign Missionary Society of the Methodist Episcopal Church. After leaving school, she trained at the Foochow Woman's Hospital under the guidance of Sigourney Trask, who wrote to the Woman's Foreign Missionary Society describing Hü's skills and good character. She requested that Hü should go to the United States to train in medicine. In 1884, Hü travelled to New York City, then to Philadelphia. On arrival in the United States, Hü could not speak English and she spent the summer before college learning intensively with Sarah Moore. She then attended Ohio Wesleyan Female College from 1884 to 1888, which by that time had been merged with Ohio Wesleyan University.

In 1888, Hü went to the Woman's Medical College of Philadelphia. After two years, Hü fell ill and took a break from study to visit her family in China, with a trip to Japan on the way there. By this time, her father was suffering from tuberculosis and Hü spent her time nursing him, overseeing the construction of a new family home and working in the local hospital. When the house was finished in 1892, she returned to Philadelphia to complete her training, graduating in May 1894. She then worked for a year in the Philadelphia Polyclinic.

== Career ==
Hü returned to Fuzhou in 1895 and began work at the Foochow Hospital for Women and Children. After one year, the supervising doctor returned to the United States and Hü was put in charge of the entire hospital.

In 1899, she became resident physician at the Woolston Memorial Hospital. At first, many patients demanded to see a foreign doctor not a, "Chinese student," but by the summer the number of patients had increased and Hü had to open the dispensary on extra days. From 1899 to 1901, Hü trained two medical students, one of whom was her younger sister Hü Seuk Eng (許淑訇). The hospital struggled with the number of patients, to the extent that a house was built for Hü on a hill outside the hospital grounds to allow for more patient beds to be installed. The number of cases dealt with by the hospital increased from 1,837 in 1899 to 24,091 in 1910.

Although it has been reported that Hü acted as representative to the International Congress of Women 1899, London, the minutes of the meeting list the representative of China as Madame Shen.

In 1906, Hü opened the course taught at the Woolston Memorial Hospital to any female who could pass a certain exam. Of the four students that passed that year, three were not Christian. However, the hospital continued to run Christian services every morning. Some of the patients Hu treated converted to Christianity, but this was relatively small in relation to the total number of patients the hospital served.

In 1907, Hü fell seriously ill and was unable to run the hospital. Though some advised that the hospital should be closed, her younger sister took over the responsibilities of management. Seuk Eng recalled that many patients arrived expecting to be cured by merely touching Hü's clothing or looking at her and were disappointed to see, "the little Dr Hü." However, the hospital continued running and Hü returned to advise her sister when she had recovered.

== Later life ==
When the Woolston Memorial Hospital was burned down by bandits in January 1927, Hü moved with her younger sister to Singapore. She suffered a stroke and died on 16 August 1929.

== Awards ==
- Honorary degree in Master of Science, Ohio Wesleyan University

== Compositions ==
Hü is recorded as having been very popular with her teachers and classmates at college and some of her literary writings are preserved. She composed the poem below to thank her teacher for a gift.

You taught me a lesson not long ago,

Which I have learned, as I'll try to show.
When you would return a plate to its owner,
Of something upon it you must be the donor.
One orange you put on that plate of mine,

Two oranges find on this plate of thine.

== Personal life ==
Hü adopted a son and a daughter from the local community when she was working at the Woolston Memorial Hospital. Dr Hsu's daughter was her own brother's eldest daughter,Dora, who was already living just next door to her's in Foochow.
