= Birdwood Van Someren Taylor =

English physician and missionary (1852–1939)

Birdwood Van Someren Taylor (1852 – 31 July 1939) was an English physician, teacher and clergyman. He was the second Church Mission Society medical missionary to go to China in 1878, working during the height of the Opium War, with a focus on Fuzhou (Fuh-Chow), Fukien, and Hinghwa. Noted for his work addressing opium addiction and leprosy, Taylor founded mission hospitals in Fukien, including three significant hospitals with the largest in Hingwa. He incorporated medical education into the hospitals and translated English medical textbooks into the local dialects. He also served as the founding Principal of Union Medical College in Western China. Taylor was also known for bringing English lawn tennis to the Fukien area.

== Early life and education ==
Birdwood Van Someren Taylor was born in 1852 in Borsad, India. His parents, J. V. S. Taylor, and Eliza Sarah Pritchard Taylor were Christian missionaries and worked primarily in Gujarat, India. They served as missionaries until Eliza fell sick, causing them to move back to Scotland with their children. Eliza died on 26 June 1858 when Taylor was 6 years old. He grew up primarily in Scotland with a Protestant upbringing.

Later, he attended the University of Edinburgh where he received his M. B and C.M, becoming both a medical doctor and an ordained member of the clergy.

== Personal life ==
On 1 August 1878, Taylor married Christiana Downing in Viewforth, Midlothian, Scotland. They were married by his grandfather, George Pritchard. Taylor and Downing had three children.

== Career ==
Shortly after his marriage to Downing, Taylor left for Fuh-Chow, China, arriving on 30 November 1878 to work as the second medical missionary for the Church Missionary Society in China. He followed William Welton, who helped the Chinese Medical Society establish the first dispensary hospital in Fuh-Chow in 1850. He opened the first hospital in Funing in 1883.

John Wolfe assigned Taylor to develop more hospitals and dispensaries in Fukien after the destruction of the Black Stone Hill mission by anti-religious actors. The belief was that the community would respond better to medical missionaries than religious missionaries.

Taylor established his reputation as a medical provider, through the curing of opium addiction of a senior military officer. Upon his cure, the officer held a public ceremony and hung an official military banner outside the Funing Hospital declaring the ability of the foreign Taylor to provide cures.

Taylor oversaw the CMS mission in Fuh-Chow and trained medical catechists to assist him in the proceedings of the hospital. Taylor pressed the mission leadership to start a physician training program to increase the clinical services. With these newly trained assistants, Taylor built classrooms for clinical education into the hospital at Funing and translated medical textbooks into the local language.

Taylor and his team primarily treated opium addicts and leprosy. It was estimated that up to two-thirds of patients were addicted to opium and seeking treatment for this. Through Taylor's work, China had the largest number of dispensary hospitals serving the area by the 1880s. They were primarily run by CMS missionaries and volunteers.

Taylor worked in both Fuh-Chow and Fuh-Ning, serving Fuh-Chow from 1878 to 1882. In 1882, Taylor started working primarily in the prefectures of Fuh-ning and led the medical mission established in the area with the Chinese men he had trained. He was succeeded in leading the Fuh-ning hospital by Samuel Synge in 1897. Taylor also assisted Dr. Rigg, a medical missionary who had similar duties in Kieng-ning, a nearby town in Fuh-kien.

In 1894, Taylor transferred to Hinghwa, where he opened the largest hospital in Fukien with a dispensary. In 1929, the China Medical Journal covered the Hinghwa hospital, highlighting that it had eight separate departments and at least 260 beds.

In 1911, Taylor was called back to Fuh-Chow. Due to his experience teaching medicine, he was appointed Founding Principal of Union Medical College when it opened in 1911. Union Medical College was a collaboration between Americans (Congregationalists), Anglicists and Methodist Episcopalians. Taylor served as the principal until 1918.

== Writing ==
During his time in China, Taylor published several articles and letters of importance:

- "The Training of Chinese Students in Medicine and Surgery by Medical Missionaries, in its Missionary Aspect" which was published by the Chinese Medical Association Publishing House.
- "The Massacre of Missionaries" which appeared in The Times (London) on 8 August 1895.
- "Medical Mission Work During the Plague at Hing-hwa", Mercy and Truth Feb 1897, pp 42-43.
- "The Year's Work at Hing-hwa", Mercy and Truth, Sept 1897, pp. 203-207.
- China Mission: Original Papers: Letters and Papers of Missionaries: Birdwood Van Someren Taylor, 1878–1880. United Kingdom: Adam Matthew Digital, 2018.

== Retirement and death ==
On 24 February 1929, Taylor returned to England to retire at The Vale in Golders Green, Middlesex. He died on 31 July 1939.
