= St. Barnabas's Hospital in Beijing =

- Anglican Church of China

Geography
- Location: Beijing, China
- Coordinates: 39°54′24″N 116°23′51″E (Beijing)

History
- Opened: before 1949
- Closed: after 1949

Links
- Lists: Hospitals in China

St. Barnabas's Hospital (Chinese: 安国圣巴拿巴医院) is a hospital in Beijing, China founded by the Anglican Church of China. St. Barnabas and other Christian hospitals in China were taken over by the communist government after 1949.
