= Sheng Jing Hospital =

Coordinates: 41.773752°N 123.426687°E

- Ministry of Health (China)

Geography
- Location: Shenyang, Heping District, Liaoning, China

Organisation
- Care system: Public
- Type: General and teaching
- Affiliated university: China Medical University School of Medicine

Services
- Emergency department: Yes
- Beds: 4,800 +

History
- Founded: 1883

Links
- Website: http://www.sj-hospital.org
- Lists: Hospitals in China

The Sheng Jing (盛京) Hospital was founded by Dugald Christie (missionary) (1855-1936), a Scottish missionary doctor in 1883. It was the base on which the Mukden Medical College was formed, also by Christie, in 1912. In 1949 the Mukden Medical College was absorbed by the China Medical University and the hospital became known as the 2nd Affiliated hospital of the China Medical University. In 1969 it was moved, by Chairman Mao, to Chaoyang but returned to Shenyang in 1983. In 2002 the hospital took over the Third Affiliated Hospital of the China Medical University and set up the Huaxiang Campus. In 2003, on the 120th anniversary of its founding, it restored the name as Shenjing Hospital. It is situated near the famous San Hao Jie (Computer town)三好街. The hospital is one of the largest hospitals in the city of Shenyang, Liaoning Province. Its motto is "United and dedicated; Disciplined and responsible; Caring and trustworthy; Professional and innovative."

In 2012 a history of the hospital and Dr Christie was published by Liaoning University Press.

The hospital is known for its famous specialists clinic.

Address:36 No.3 Street, Heping District

== See also ==
- Mukden Medical College
- China Medical University (PRC)

== Gallery ==
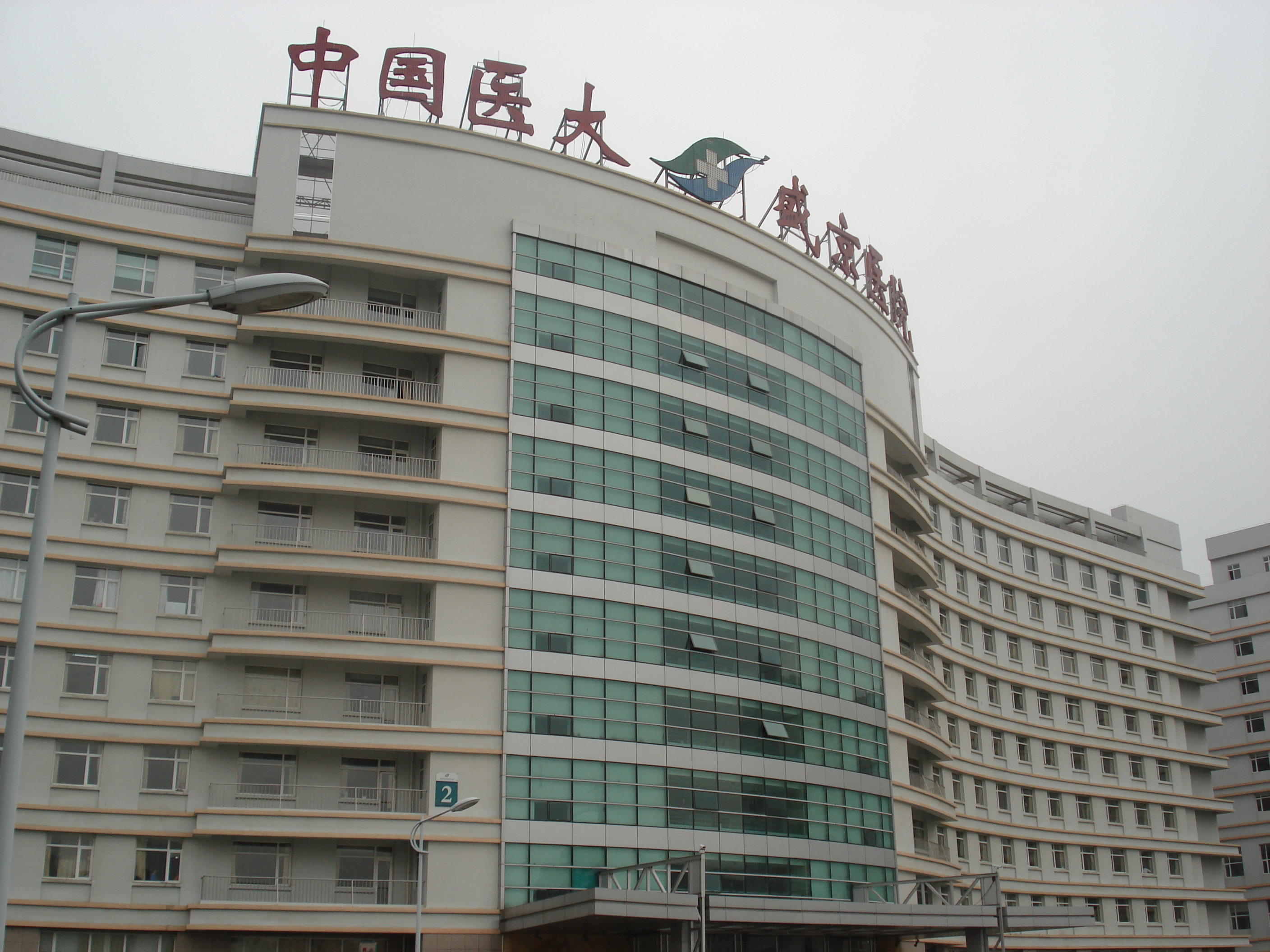
Huaxian Section

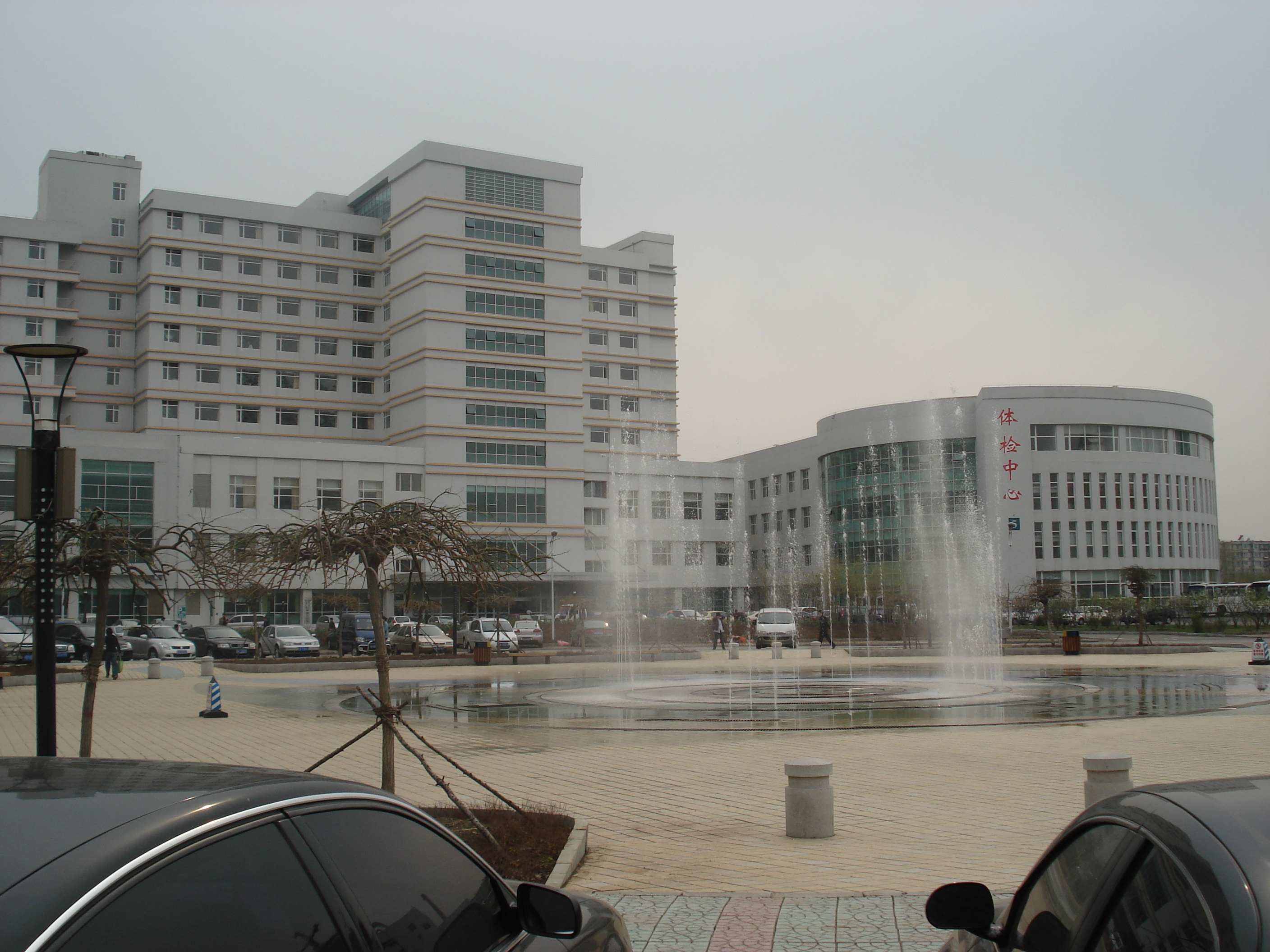
Huaxian Section

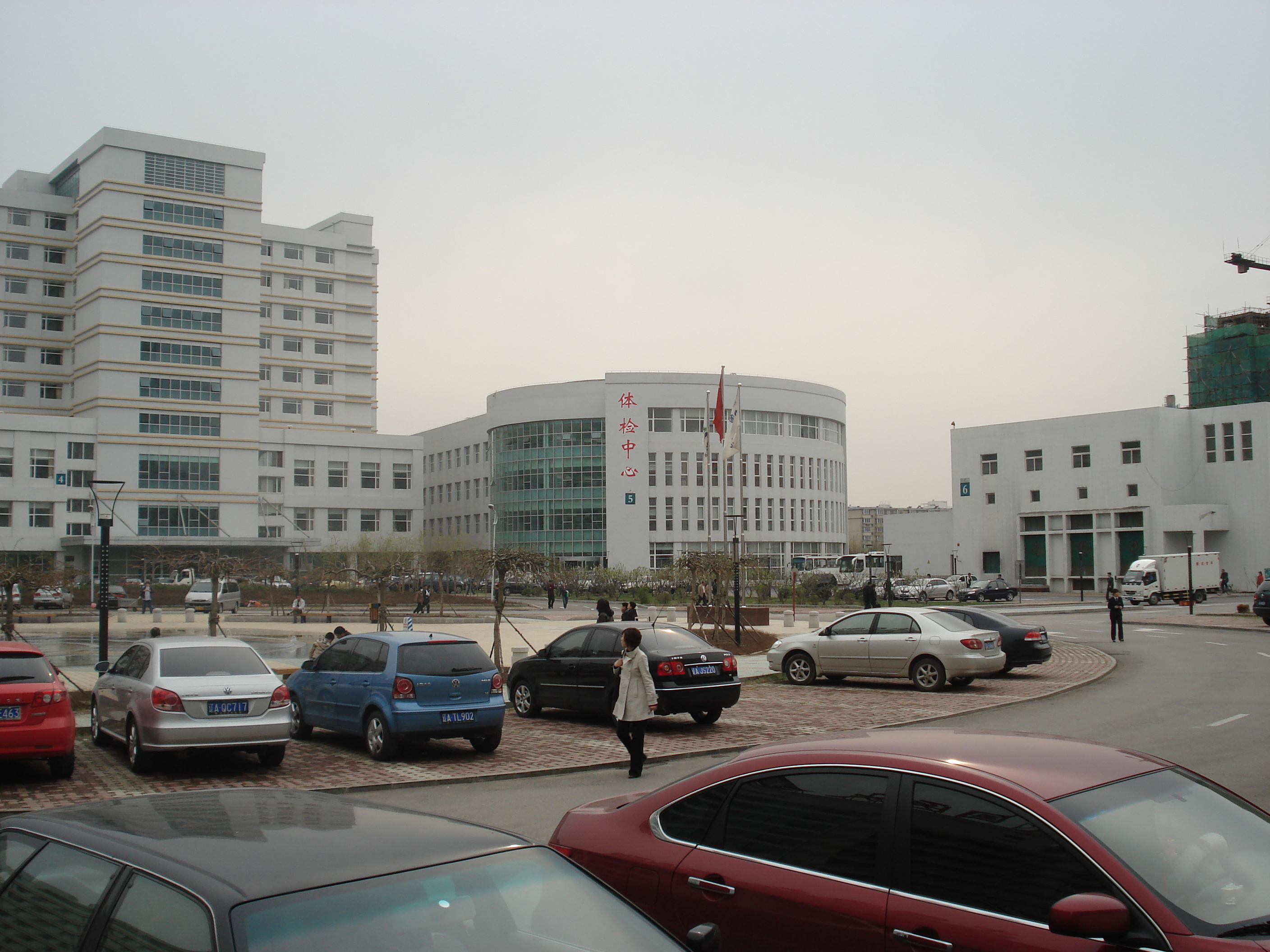
Huaxian Section
