= Iva Sidash =

Ukrainian photographer

- Іва Сідаш
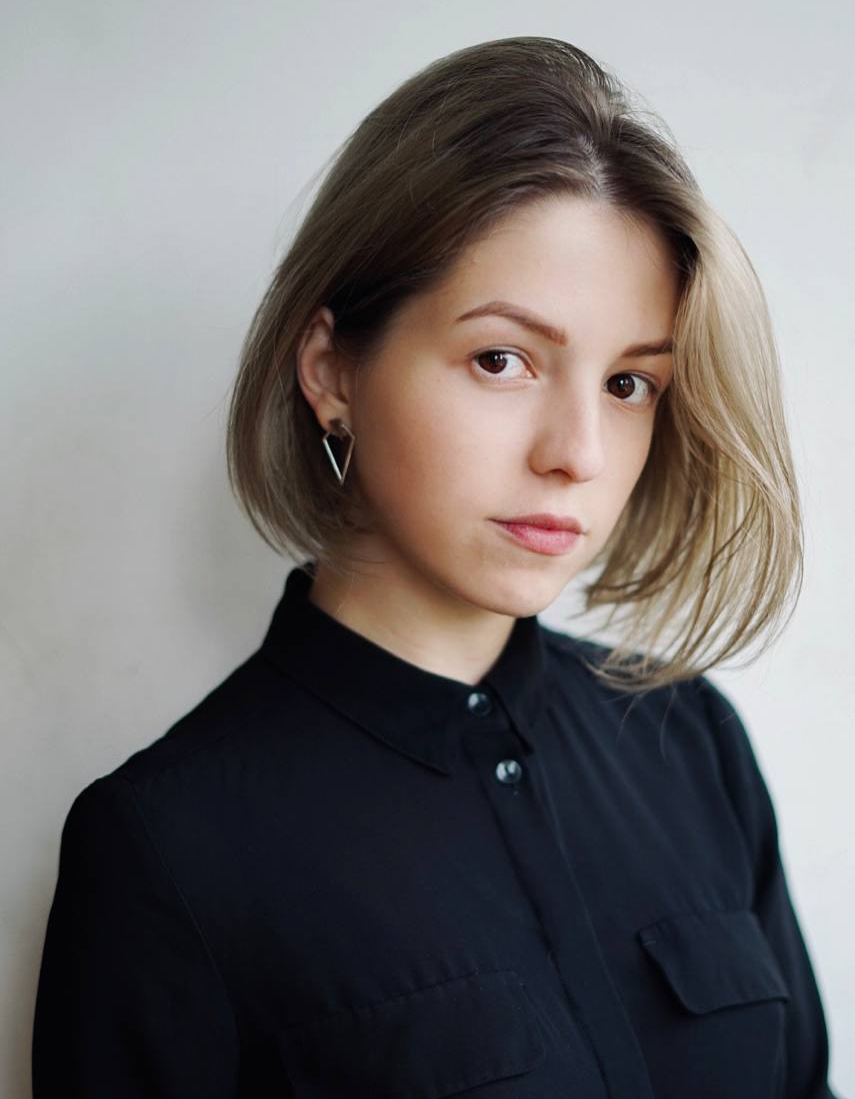
- Born: 30 June 1995 (age 30); Lviv, Ukraine

Iva Sidash, also Yana Sidash (Ukrainian: Іва Сідаш, born 30 June 1995), is a Ukrainian street and documentary photographer.

== Biography ==
She has been engaged in photography since 2019. In 2022, graduated from the Visual Storytelling ICP masterclass. Has been covering a full-scale Russian invasion of Ukraine in 2022. Works are published in Financial Times, Der Spiegel, Business Insider, Göteborgs-Posten, Fisheye Magazine, Ukraїner, Bird in Flight", Reporters, The Village Ukraine, The Village Ukraine, Untitled, Prostranstvo.media.

== Awards ==
- Finalist of the International Fujifilm Moment Street Photo Awards (2021)
- Scholarship for ICP/CAMERA Masterclass held in Italy (2022)
- Top 3 best projects completed at ICP/CAMERA Masterclass (2022)
- Directory grant for the full-time program at ICP "Documentary Practises and Visual Journalism" (2023, New York, US)

== Exhibitions ==
=== Solo exhibitions ===
- 2023 – Roberta's Art Gallery, "The Wall: Witness to the War in Ukraine" Whitewater, US

=== Group exhibitions ===
- 2023 – Fisheye Gallery - “Alarming Beauty” Paris, France
- 2023 – Centrum för fotografi: CFF - “Invasion” Stockholm, Sweden
- 2023 – Hémisphères Paris - “Ukraine” Paris, France
- 2023 – Taller 131 - “Nostalgia De Una Rutina Interrumpida” Barcelona, Spain
- 2022, 2023 – Zimmer 48 - “Ukraine. Resilience"” Berlin, Germany
- 2022 – Praxis Gallery “Ukraine: Portraits Of Courage” Minneapolis, United States
- 2022 – The International Convention Center "Ukrainian House" - “Flash. Ukrainian photography today” Kyiv, Ukraine
- 2022 – Lviv Historical Museum “Chorna rillya izorana” Lviv, Ukraine
- 2021 – Lviv Municipal Art Center “Street Dialogues 2.0” Lviv Ukraine
- 2021 – Odesa Photo Days Festival “Street dialogues” Odesa, Ukraine
