= Mukden Medical College =

Medical school in Mukden, China

Mukden Medical College (also spelt Moukden Medical College) was a medical school in Mukden (now Shenyang), China, founded in 1892 as the Sheng Jing Medical School (this was primarily an 'apprentice' school teaching medical assistants).

The Mukden Medical College grew out of the Mukden Hospital or Sheng Jing Hospital, founded by Dr. Dugald Christie, a Scottish missionary doctor. His son, Ronald Christie, later became Dean of Medicine at McGill University in Montréal, Québec, Canada. In 1883 and 1884 a 12-bed hospital was opened by Dr. Christie with support from the United Presbyterian Church of Scotland and a few young men were enrolled as apprentices to this hospital. After three years of study, they were given certificates as medical assistants, pharmacists or nursing aides.

In 1892 eight young men were enrolled for a 5-year programme and as a result, a preliminary medical school, the Shenching (or Sheng Jing) Medical School, was established. Between 1892 and 1910 Dr. Christie lobbied and fund-raised in China and Scotland as he wished to open a more formal medical school. In 1911 a four-storey building was completed beside the hospital and the college accepted its first students and opened as the Mukden Medical College in January 1912. This College was supported by the Conference of the Scottish and Irish (Presbyterian) Missions and the Danish Missions in Manchuria. In 1934 the University of Edinburgh recognised graduates of the College, which allowed them to gain admittance to various graduate programmes in Edinburgh. From 1939 to 1945 the Mukden Medical College was renamed, in English, the Christie Memorial Medical College to avoid confusion with the (Japanese) Manchuria Medical College – run by the South Manchuria Railway – which was also in Mukden.

The original name, Mukden Medical College, was restored in 1945 and it was briefly known as the Liaoning Medical College before being absorbed in 1949 (along with the Manchuria Medical College) by the China Medical University, the first medical school established by the Chinese Communist Party.

== The hospital today ==
The Mukden Medical College operated a teaching hospital, in fact it grew out of the hospital founded by Dugald Christie. After 1949, when the MMC was absorbed by the China Medical University (PRC), this hospital became known as the 2nd Affiliated Hospital of the China Medical University. It is now known as the Sheng Jing Hospital.
