= China Medical University (Liaoning) =

Medical university in Shenyang, China

Coordinates: 41.7892°N 123.3725°E

- 中国医科大学
- Former names: Military Medical School of the Chinese Workers' and Peasants' Red Army
- Type: Public medical university
- Established: 1931
- Chancellor: Wang Zhenning
- President: Qu Bo
- Faculty: 17,482
- Undergraduates: 9,529
- Postgraduates: 9,061
- Location: Shenyang, Liaoning, People's Republic of China
- Campus: urban 1,534,500 m^{2}
- Colors: Red
- Website: www.cmu.edu.cn

China Medical University (CMU; 中国医科大学) is a public medical university in Shenyang, Liaoning, China. The university was the first medical school established by the Chinese Communist Party. The predecessor of the university was the Military Medical School of the Chinese Workers' and Peasants' Red Army founded in Ruijin, Jiangxi Province in November 1931.

China Medical University is authorized to grant doctoral degrees in seven primary disciplines — Basic Medicine, Clinical Medicine, Biology, Stomatology, Public Health and Preventive Medicine, Nursing, and Pharmacy — and master's degrees in 12 primary disciplines, along with two professional doctoral degree categories and nine professional master's degree categories. It has five national key disciplines and one national key discipline in cultivation, 54 national key clinical specialty construction projects of the National Health Commission, seven Liaoning provincial "Double First-Class" construction disciplines, seven postdoctoral research stations and three postdoctoral workstations, and 26 undergraduate programs. The university comprises 17 colleges, three research institutes and two teaching departments, and runs three general affiliated hospitals and two specialty hospitals, with 12,842 beds in total.

== History ==
The China Medical University (CMU) was the first medical school established by the Chinese Communist Party. Its precursor was the Chinese Workers'-Peasants' Red Army Military Medical School and Chinese Workers'-Peasants' Red Army Health School which had been founded in Ruijin, Jiangxi in 1931. After the Long March with the Red Army, it was relocated to Shanbei.

In 1940, comrade Mao Zedong proposed, and the central committee of the Chinese Communist Party approved, the name of the school being changed to China Medical University. In July 1946, the university was ordered to enter northeast China with the army and reached Xinshan city (now Hegang city), Heilongjiang province. In November 1948, the whole northeast of China was liberated and the university was ordered to move to Shenyang. In 1948 and 1949, it absorbed the medical school formerly operated by the (Japanese) South Manchuria Railway (the South Manchuria Medical College, later called the Shenyang Medical College which had opened in 1911) and the Mukden Medical College (sometimes spelled Moukden Medical College) whose origins go back to 1892 when Dr Dugald Christie founded the Shenjing Medical School. In 1911/1912, this became a formal medical college, the Mukden Medical College.

== Department structureCollege of Basic Medical Sciences ==
=== Colleges and Schools ===
- College of Basic Medical Sciences
- The First Clinical College and The First Affiliated Hospital
- The Second Clinical College and The Second Affiliated Hospital (Sheng Jing Hospital)
- The Fourth Clinical College and Fourth Affiliated Hospital
- School of Stomatology and Affiliated Stomatological Hospital
- College of Public Health
- Faculty of Forensic Medicine
- College of Nursing
- China Medical University with Queen's University Belfast Joint College
- School of Life Sciences
- School of Pharmacy
- School of Health Management
- School of Intelligent Medicine
- School of Marxism
- School of Medical Humanities
- International Education School
- School of Continuing Education

=== Research Institutes ===
- Institute of Health Sciences
- Institute for Medical Education Evaluation and Reform
- Institute of Reproductive and Child Health

=== Teaching Departments ===
- Department of Foreign Languages
- Department of Physical Education

=== Former Clinical Colleges ===
- The Third Clinical College and The Third Affiliated Hospital (merged with Sheng Jing Hospital)

== Rankings and Reputation ==
The MBBS program at China Medical University has been taught in the English language since 1978. On U.S. News & World Report Best Global University Ranking by subject Clinical Medicine, it is ranked #345 in the world, #55 in Asia and #10 in China. It ranks among the top medical universities in China, according to CWTS Leiden Ranking 2018 and Chinese university ranking (CUAA) 2018. It is also approved by the Chinese Ministry of Education to recruit international students for its English-medium programs. On World Directory of Medical Schools (a product of World Federation for Medical Education and the Foundation for Advancement of International Medical Education and Research), the MBBS program is listed as taught in Chinese, Japanese and English. CMU has three large and modern affiliated hospitals, where students can do internship in the final year. Sheng Jing Hospital is famous for gynecology and obstetrics.

== See also ==
- Education in the People's Republic of China
- List of universities in China
