= St. Stephen's Hospital in Beijing =

Anglican founded hospital in Beijing, China

Geography
- Location: Beijing, China
- Coordinates: 39°54′24″N 116°23′51″E (Beijing)

History
- Opened: before 1939

Links
- Lists: Hospitals in China

St. Stephen's Hospital (Chinese: 永清圣司提反医院) is a hospital in Beijing, China. It was founded by the Anglican Church of China. There was a massacre at the hospital during World War II.
