= First Affiliated Hospital of Nankai University =

Hospital in China

Tianjin People's Hospital (formerly Mackenzie Memorial Hospital and Tientsin Mission Hospital and Dispensary) is a hospital in Tianjin, China. Prior to the Chinese Communist Revolution, it was known as Mackenzie Memorial Hospital. Olympian Eric Liddell was born there in 1902.

== History ==
Tianjin People's Hospital was originally founded as the Tientsin Mission Hospital and Dispensary by Dr. John Kenneth Mackenzie of the London Missionary Society in 1880. Following his death, Mackenzie was succeeded by Dr. Fred C. Roberts, who led the hospital from 1888 until his death in 1894.

On December 4, 2024, Nankai University, Tianjin University, and the Tianjin Municipal Health Commission held a signing ceremony. The Tianjin Municipal Health Commission and Nankai University agreed to jointly develop Tianjin People's Hospital, designating it as a directly affiliated hospital of Nankai University and officially naming it the First Affiliated Hospital of Nankai University.
