= John Kenneth MacKenzie =

English medical missionary

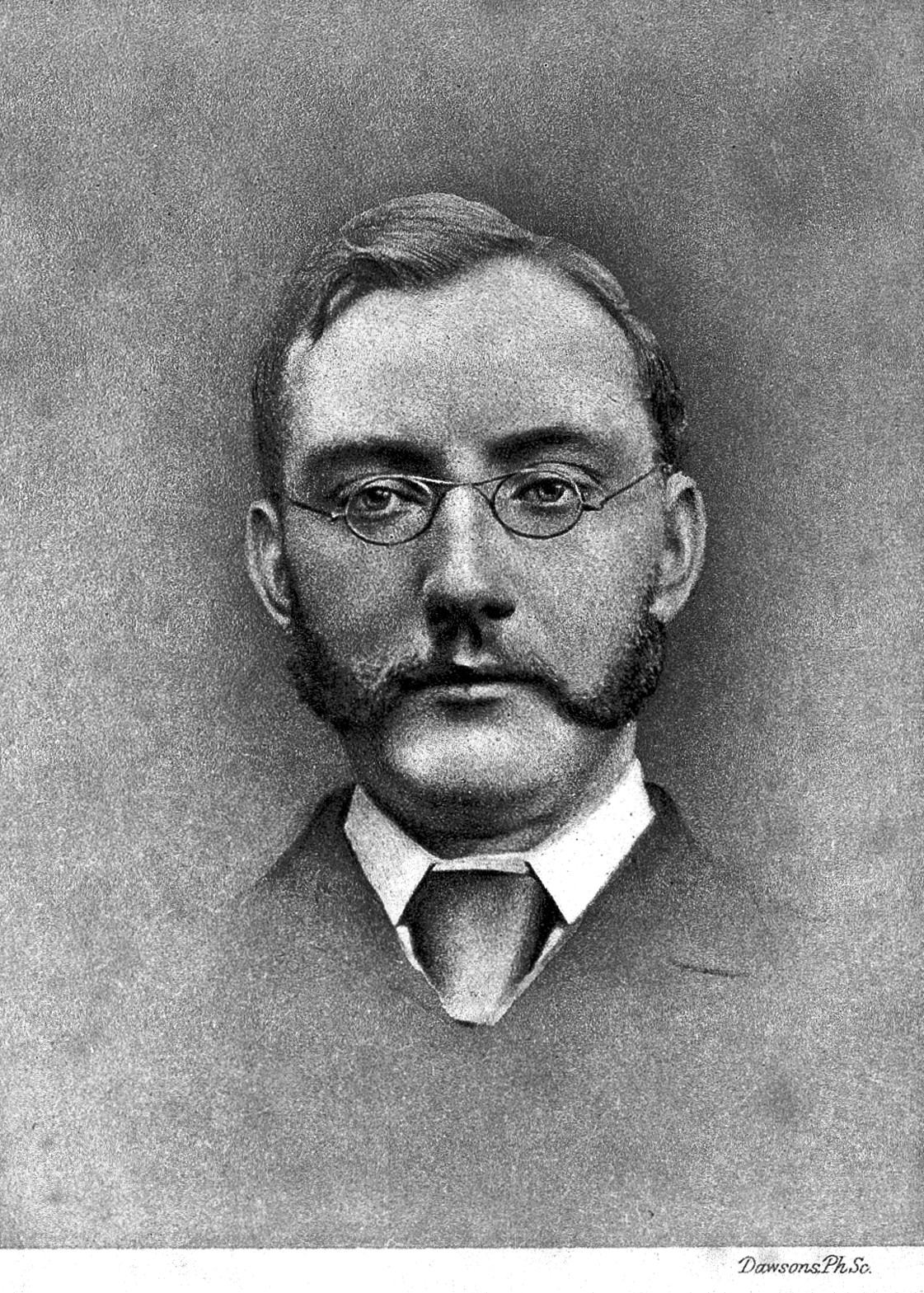

John Kenneth MacKenzie (25 August 1850 – 1 April 1888) was an English medical missionary to China. He initially started his work through the London Missionary Society in Hankou (Hankow) in 1875. In Hankou, he treated patients in the London Missionary Society hospital, learned Chinese, and engaged in evangelism. The majority of the cases he treated were eye disease, opium addiction, and cases involving surgery. In 1878, MacKenzie transferred to Tianjin (Tientsin) due to the failing health of his wife. In Tianjin, MacKenzie constructed and ran a hospital with the help of the Viceroy's patronage and also established the Tientsin Medical School. MacKenzie also helped in the organisation of the Medical Missionary Association in China and the editing of the Medical Missionary Journal. He employed evangelism in many parts of his work but died an early death in 1888 due to smallpox.

== Early life ==
John Kenneth MacKenzie was born in Yarmouth, England on 25 August 1850. His father, Alexander Mackenzie, was a Scotsman from Ross-shire and his Welsh mother, Margaret Mackenzie, was from Breconshire. Both sets of grandparents were extremely religious. After moving to Bristol when he was an infant, John MacKenzie's father became deeply attached to Reverend Matthew Dickie at the Presbyterian Church. This created a very religious environment at the MacKenzie household. John was described to be reserved but easily provoked as a child, as well as having a sympathising heart. After attending a private school in Bristol, he wasn't fond of studying so he left school at age fifteen and became a clerk in a merchant's office. MacKenzie started to regularly attend the meetings of the Young Men's Christian Association in Bristol. Even though he stopped attending the meetings, Christianity was still a very strong influence in his life. MacKenzie spoke to his friend Colonel Duncan about how he had an urge to engage in the Lord's work in foreign fields so Colonel Duncan recommended that MacKenzie read a book entitled, "The Double Cure; or, What is a Medical Mission?" After reading his book, MacKenzie decided to ask his parents if he could quit his job and begin to study medicine with the goal of going to China as a medical missionary. MacKenzie's parents agreed and he quickly enrolled into medical school.

== Education ==
In October 1870, John Kenneth MacKenzie enrolled in the Bristol Medical School and received his M.R.C.S. London and L.R.C.P. Edinburgh diplomas in four short years. While in Edinburgh, MacKenzie met Dr. Lowe, a member of the Edinburgh Medical Missionary Society. MacKenzie had already expressed interest in travelling to China from reading memoirs of Burns and Henderson, but Dr. Lowe strengthened his desire by explaining China's great need of a medical missionary to take charge of a hospital in Hankou. Thus, MacKenzie decided to offer his services to the London Missionary Society for medical missionary work in Hankou. He set off to China on the S.S. Glenlyon on 8 April 1875.

== Medical missionary work in China ==
=== Hankou ===
On 8 June 1875, MacKenzie was welcomed to Hankou by Mr. and Mrs. Griffith John as well as Mr. Foster, his future colleagues. Hankou, previously known as the "Heart of the Empire", is large and situated in the middle of the central province of Hubei where the Yangtze River and the Han River meet. In Hankou, MacKenzie assisted Dr. Reid at the local missionary hospital and dispensary. In addition, MacKenzie also took daily Chinese lessons after work in the hospital. He faced tremendous prejudice because many of the Chinese did not trust the medicine of the foreign part of the Christians living in Hankou. But after MacKenzie successfully attended the chief deacon of the Hankou Church, the distrust was alleviated. In August, MacKenzie suffered heavily from malaria, but recovered in a month and he soon became head doctor at the hospital. Although he was very busy in the hospital, MacKenzie felt the urge to help the surrounding villages in the country-side surrounding Hankou. He and Mr. Joh, a colleague, visited a number of villages where eye disease was the most prevalent cases. At some of the villages they met physical hostility toward foreign Christians, but after meeting with the chief magistrate of the district, the magistrate issued a proclamation through the district and the villagers were much more welcoming the second time around.

Word of the foreign doctor soon spread all across the province of Hubei. John MacKenzie cured hundreds of opium smoking patients and thousands of other patients. He discovered that many Chinese doctors were coming to him with questions and he realised that they had little to no knowledge of anatomy or physiology. He began his plans to construct a medical school with the hopes of teaching Chinese doctors how to perform surgery.

In December 1876, Dr. MacKenzie travelled to Shanghai to marry Miss Travers, the woman he met while doing Christian work in Bristol. They returned to Hankou and continued their daily work; MacKenzie worked at the hospital and cured an average of 100 patients each day and Miss Travers began to learn Chinese. There was a cholera outbreak that MacKenzie treated and there was also an increase in surgeries, indicating the building trust of the Chinese to western medicine.

=== Tianjin ===
In March 1879, Dr. MacKenzie and his family moved stations from Hankou to Tianjin. This move was due to family matters for the health of his wife was failing and he believed a change in environment would be best. At this time, Dr. MacKenzie also had a daughter named Maggie. Tianjin is located in the North very close to the capital, Beijing. It was the port of the capital at that time. Upon his arrival at Tianjin, the city had no hospital or foreign drugs, only a small dispensary ran by a Mr. Pai. MacKenzie used his own money to buy foreign drugs to dispense to people in need but only a few showed up each day. After curing a general one day, he discussed with him his plans of building a new hospital. This information was passed onto the Viceroy of the province who decided to help fund the construction and running of the new hospital. After the completion of the hospital, residents of Tianjin and the surrounding areas came in great numbers to be treated. MacKenzie treated many cases of eye disease, performed many surgeries, and gave out thousands of vaccines. He was assisted in 1887 and 1888 by Dr. Fred Charles Roberts, who would end up succeeding Mackenzie after his death.

=== Chinese Medical School ===
Even though MacKenzie was struggling to keep up with the hospital, he still had the goal of creating a medical school in China to teach the Chinese of western medicine. His proposition was accepted by the government and thus, he received eight students who were to be used as medical officers by the government after their education with MacKenzie. His small medical school was officially opened in December 1881. The structure of the school mirrored that of western schools, with textbooks, exams, and papers. MacKenzie took a break from China in 1883 for five months to return to England to visit his wife and daughter who had moved back after Ms. MacKenzie's health continued to decline. When he returned, six students graduated from the Tientsin Medical School in 1884 after three years of study. MacKenzie withdrew from being involved in the medical school because he didn't want to spend his time raising pupils up to be Government workers.

== Late life ==
In the autumn of 1886, it was decided that all of the medical missionaries in China should come together and form a society called the Medical Missionary Association of China. MacKenzie was a prominent part in organising this society and also helped edit the society's journal entitled, Medical Missionary Journal. He contributed to the journal a few times. He died on Easter Day, 1888 from smallpox contracted from a patient.
