= Red House Hospital =

The Obstetrics and Gynecology Hospital of Fudan University
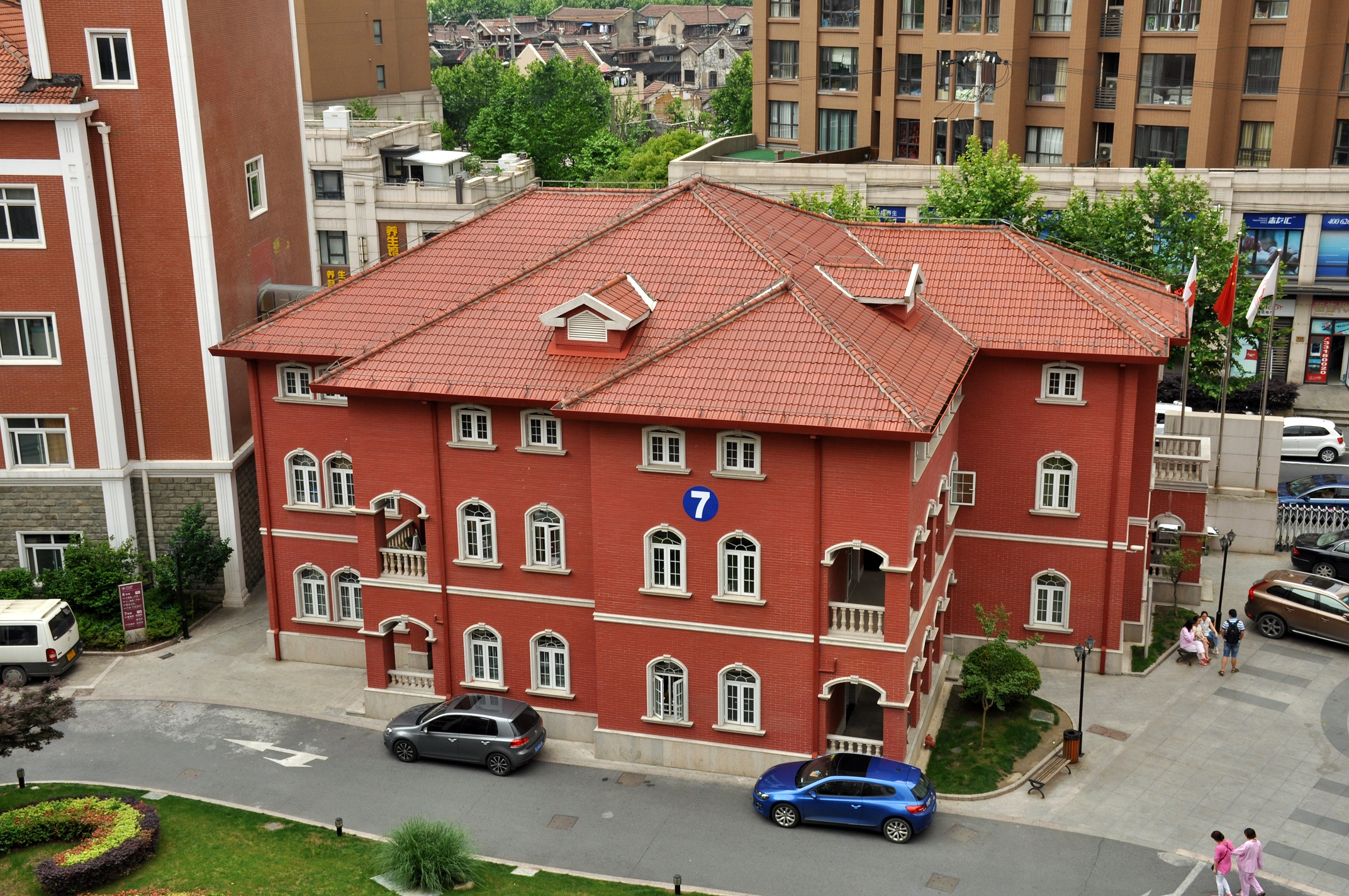
- The "Red House" of the hospital (2015)

Geography
- Location: Huangpu District and Yangpu District, Shanghai, China
- Coordinates: 31°12′51″N 121°28′59″E

Organisation
- Care system: Public
- Type: Teaching, Specialist
- Affiliated university: Shanghai Medical College of Fudan University

Services
- Emergency department: No
- Beds: 820

History
- Founded: 1884

Links
- Website: fckyy.fudan.edu.cn
- Lists: Hospitals in China

The Obstetrics and Gynecology Hospital of Fudan University (Chinese: 复旦大学附属妇产科医院), commonly known as the Red House Hospital (Chinese: 红房子医院), is a teaching hospital in Shanghai, China, affiliated with the Shanghai Medical College of Fudan University. It is rated Grade 3, Class A, the highest rating in the Chinese medical system.

Founded in 1884 as Margaret Williamson Memorial Hospital for Women and Children, by Elizabeth Reifsnyder, it was the first hospital opened in Shanghai exclusively for the care of Chinese women and children. It was located on Siccawei Road in the Shanghai French Concession, outside the West Gate (Ximen) of the Chinese city (now in Huangpu District); for this reason, it was commonly known as the Ximen or West Gate Hospital (Chinese: 西門醫院). The nonsectarian missionary hospital was established by the Woman's Union Missionary Society. A second branch was opened in Yangpu District in 2009.

== Overview ==
The hospital has two locations, the original site at 419 Fangxie Road in Huangpu District and a second branch in Yangpu District. Together the two branches occupy 4.33 hectares (10.7 acres) and have a total floor space of 84,600 square metres (911,000 sq ft). It has 14 departments and 820 beds, treating 1.3 million outpatients and 46,000 inpatients per year.

== History ==
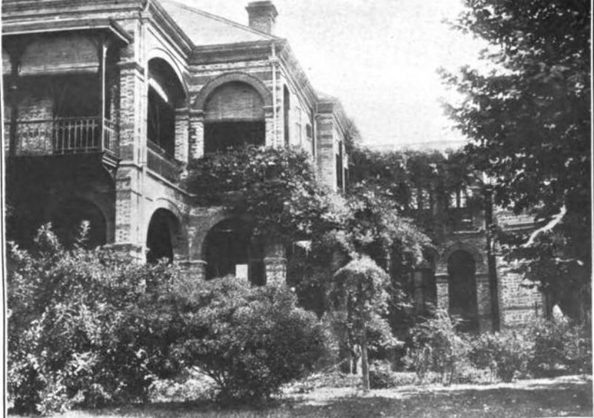
Margaret Williamson Hospital (1915)

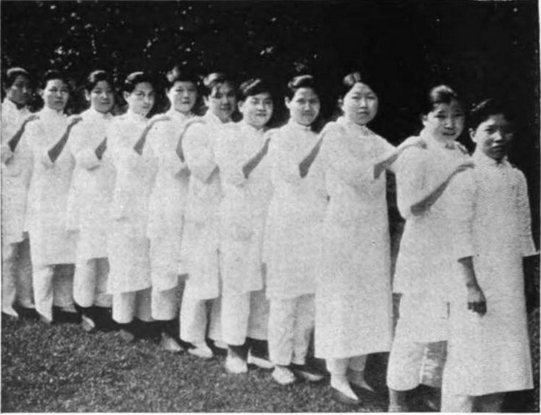
Nursing staff (1919)

The land, building, furnishing, wire-beds, instruments, and salary of a physician and nurse for seven years were all provided, at an expense of US$35,000, by Margaret Williamson, for whom the hospital was named. A maternity ward was added, at a cost of $17,000, by two sisters of Princeton, New Jersey, as well as another ward through a legacy from Dr. Wells Williams. The first piece of land was secured in 1883, the year of the donor's death. Eight more pieces were later added, all outside the city limits. In addition to the medical buildings, there was a home for medical workers, and a house for nurses and assistants.

The Women's Union Missionary Society was founded for the purpose of evangelizing local women, mainly by the founding of schools and orphanages, and in this instance, by the founding of a hospital for women by the American medical missionary Elizabeth Reifsnyder. While women rarely went to Chinese hospitals, commonly only under circumstances of very great suffering, it was believed that the Margaret Williamson Hospital would be filled to overflowing.

The hospital was formally opened on 3 June 1884. The building was a two-storied structure on the road to Sikawei, not far from the West Gate. This was the fourth hospital opened exclusively for women in China. The first was in Beijing by Dr. Lucinda L. Combs (Peking Women's Hospital, 1874). The second was in Fuzhou by Dr. Sigourney Trask (1877), and the third in Tianjin by Dr. Leonora Howard (Isabella Fisher Hospital, 1882); both were under the Methodist Episcopal Board of Missions.

After the Reifsnyder-built building burned down, a new one was constructed in 1889 with funds given wholly by Chinese and foreigners in Shanghai. Approximately three-fourths of the support of the institution came from fees and local contributions, mostly Chinese, and one-fourth from the income of beds which are endowed in the United States. The doctors' and nurses' salaries were paid by the missionary board.

This institution admitted only Chinese women and children, with boys up to 12 years of age. No foreigners or contagious cases were taken in. 56,620 out-patients and 1,034 in-patients (351 obstetrical) were treated in 1914. In 1915 the fees charged patients were $0.15 (Mexican) daily (in big wards); $0.50 (Mexican) daily (in semi-private wards); and $2, $4, and $5 (Mexican) daily (beds in private rooms). Those unable to pay—a large proportion of the patients—were treated without charge.

The hospital was later expanded by the American doctor Al Ralph and renamed as the Red House Maternity and Infant Hospital. During the Battle of Shanghai in 1937, it organized emergency rescue teams to treat women and children wounded in the fighting. In 1942, the hospital was transferred to Chinese ownership, and Kuang Cui'e (邝翠娥) served as the first Chinese president. It became a teaching hospital of the Shanghai Medical College in 1952, and was designated the obstetrics and gynecology hospital of the Red Cross Society of Shanghai in 1992.

In 2009, a second branch was opened at 128 Shenyang Road in Yangpu District. The new location has a floor space of 60,000 square metres (650,000 sq ft) and 450 beds.

== 1889 architecture and fittings ==
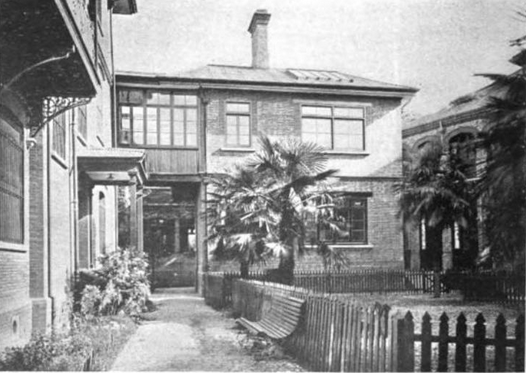
Operating pavilion

The hospital built in 1889 was made up of four brick buildings of 2.5 stories, connected by closed passageways. The first building had a clinic room, chapel, and drug room on the first floor; and on the second floor, a suite of rooms for doctor and foreign nurse, two private rooms with two beds, and one with four beds. The two operating rooms were in a second building; the clean cases being cared for in the one on the upper story and the dirty cases in the one on the lower floor. Both operating rooms were very well equipped. The third building contained the Williamson ward on the second floor, with 17 beds, and the Wells Williams ward on the lower floor, with 29 beds. Besides these there are two semiprivate wards, one containing 6 beds and the other 4 beds, and one private room with 2 beds. The fourth building was the Stevens Maternity Hospital, containing two well-equipped delivery rooms, one for clean cases and another for septic ones—35 beds for clean deliveries and 7 for septic ones.

The floors were covered with Ningpo varnish, and were scrubbed twice daily. The maternity ward was steam heated, and the other buildings supplied with stoves. The institution was lighted by electricity, and furnished with running hot and cold water. The buildings had no elevators. The hospital had one kitchen.

== Grounds ==
The hospital was located on Siccawei Road in the Shanghai French Concession, outside the west gate of the Chinese city; for this reason, it was commonly known as the West Gate Hospital. The Pont Ste. Catherine and railway station street car line passed the place about 2 miles (3.2 km) out from the French Bund. Owing to its proximity to canals holding stagnant water, the hospital grounds were infested with mosquitoes. The back of the buildings had some pleasant grounds, with grass, shrubbery, and trees. The site is now at 419 Fangxie Road in Huangpu District.

== Notable people ==
Not much was known about Williamson. She lived in New York, was not rich, but was a Christian philanthropist. Having heard a great deal of the lack of readiness of Chinese women to take advantage of the means they possessed of obtaining medical assistance, she devoted a generous sum to form a fund for the establishment of a hospital for Chinese women, to be built under the Woman's Union Missionary Society, of which Society she was one of the founders.

Bishop Boone presided at the hospital's opening, and addresses were made by Dr. Alexander Jamieson and Rev. A. J. Bamford. The institution was initially under the superintendence of Miss M. A. Burnett; the physician was Dr. Elizabeth Reifsnyder; the head nurse was Miss Elizabeth McKechnie. The Committee consisted of Reifsnyder (Secretary); Miss Burnett (Treasurer); and Mrs. Hughes, Mrs. Wetmore, Mrs. Low, and Dr. Jamieson; while the visiting physician was Dr. H. W. Boone.

By 1915 the medical staff consisted of four doctors—Dr. Reifsnyder, Dr. M. Emily Garner, Dr. Mary E. Newell, and Dr. Julia N. Wood. The nursing staff consisted of Miss Bethra Miller, an American graduate nurse, in charge of 20 Chinese women in training. Dr. Josephine C. Lawney, an American medical missionary from Vermont, was on the staff from 1919 to 1941.

Professor Wang Shuzhen, who was appointed president of the hospital in 1952, developed it into a full-fledged medical research center. She is considered a pioneer of obstetrics and gynecology in China.

== Bibliography ==
- Allen, Belle Jane (1919). A Crusade of Compassion for the Healing of the Nations: A Study of Medical Missions for Women and Children (Public domain ed.). Central committee on the united study of foreign missions.
- American Presbyterian Mission (1885). The Chinese Recorder and Missionary Journal (Public domain ed.). American Presbyterian Mission Press.
- Davy, John (1891). The collected works of Sir Humphry Davy ...: Discourses delivered before the Royal society. Elements of agricultural chemistry, pt. I (Public domain ed.). Smith, Elder and Company.
- Foster, Arnold (1889). Christian Progress in China: Gleanings from the Writings and Speeches of Many Workers (Public domain ed.). Religious Tract Society. p. 191.
- United States Navy (1915). United States Naval Medical Bulletin (Public domain ed.). U.S. Government Printing Office.
