= Carnation Gold Rush =

Floriculture boom in Colorado, 1880s–1930s

"The Carnation Gold Rush" is a term used by Denver locals, historians and preservationists to represent the period between the 1880s and 1930s when the floriculture industry developed and thrived in Colorado.

== Early years ==
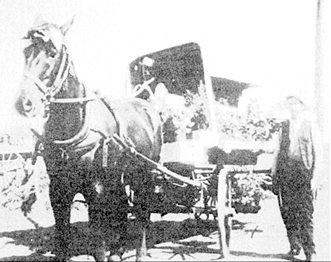
1910 Flower Delivery Cart, Denver Colorado

In 1863, as the silver and gold mining days of Colorado were winding down, those who didn’t strike it rich were searching for ways to bring goods and services to the growing population of Denver. In 1872, Denver constructed an irrigation ditch that carried water from the Platte River Canyon into Denver. With this new source of consistent water, growers soon discovered the bright sunny days and virgin soils of Denver were ideal for growing vegetables and cut flowers.

Few varieties of carnations were available during those early days and competition was fierce. Many independent growers marketed their carnations through sales outlets in their greenhouses or by selling the mature flowers to retail florists. Growers had to contend with weather extremes that required either charcoal heaters in delivery wagons during winter so the flowers wouldn’t freeze or battling the often-intense summer heat when the crops could easily wilt. Nonetheless, business flourished. Floral arrangements featuring carnations were a common gift to the women of Denver's tenderloin district as well as high society.

The first greenhouse in Denver was constructed in 1891. By 1900, the floral industry had approximately 400,000 square feet of greenhouse glass covering its nurseries. The Riverside Cemetery at 52nd and Brighton Blvd, Mauff Floral Company in the 1200 block of Logan St., established in 1880, Colfax Floral at East Colfax and Josephine, Park Floral at 17th and York, and Curtis Park Floral at 34th and Downing were some of the first establishments dedicated to the public’s desire for carnations. Colorado's Carnation Gold Rush had begun.

A marketing and grading system for carnations was established in the early 1900s. Swedish immigrant and founder of the Denver Wholesale Florist s, N.A. Benson, recognized that Colorado carnations were a valuable commodity that could be marketed nationally. He was instrumental in standardizing prices and insisting on quality from all growers. Around that time, J. Edward Johnson, of the Pikes Peak Floral Company in Colorado Springs began shipping the prized Colorado carnations to neighboring states.

== Later years ==
In the fall of 1917, George Brenkert of Washington Park Floral entered his newly developed shell pink carnation called “Denver” in the Denver Society of Ornamental Horticulturists. While he didn’t win in that show, the “Denver” carnation attracted attention and later won a Bronze Medal in the 1921 National Flower Show in Washington, DC. Colorado was becoming known for its thriving carnation and cut flower business.President Elect Harding wore a Colorado carnation in his lapel on his inauguration day. He was carrying on a tradition established by his predecessor, President William McKinley. McKinley always wore a red carnation in his lapel, and ordered fresh carnations to his office daily. McKinley’s birthday, January 29 is still recognized as the official Carnation Day.

By 1919, the 15th Census of the United States reported that the value of sales for floral crops in Colorado was $1,145,000.

From 1925 to 1927 greenhouse space used for plants and flowers more than doubled in the state of Colorado.

By 1926, Colorado produced an estimated 8,000,000 blooms of carnations.

By 1927, the floriculture industry in Colorado was shipping to 20 states. By that time, there were approximately 5,000,000 square feet of greenhouse glass on operating nurseries in Colorado.The demand for Colorado carnations was growing. Colorado was "rapidly becoming recognized as the carnation state", because of the excellent quality of the blooms and the fact that they could be produced year round. 1927 was the first year the floriculture industry of Colorado was recognized in the Colorado Year Book published by the Colorado State Planning Division

In 1928, Colorado's production of Carnations reached 12,000,000 blooms. 10 states depended entirely on Colorado for their supplies of flowers.

By 1929, there were 101 establishments, cultivating 1,582,463 square feet of carnation beds with the annual gross income of the Colorado's Floral industry of approximately $5,000,000 topping the value of metallic gold mined that year in the state. Colorado became famous throughout the country for carnations of "brilliant color, unusual size and lasting quality. " Colorado carnations made their way to New York, London and Cuba.

By 1931, Colorado was considered one of the most important states in the union for the productions of flowers including Carnation, Roses, and Gypsophilia (Baby Breath).

Local greenhouses continued to prosper and be built, particularly in the northwest corner of Denver and its suburbs. Wheat Ridge, Colorado still celebrates an annual Carnation Festival. New varieties continued to be developed including the White Ward and Hilda Varieties.

The early Denver growers began an industry that would shape Colorado’s economy and landscape. They helped to establish an orderly system to provide quality cut flowers to the nation and beyond. Some of the Colorado family names associated with the Carnation Gold Rush are Amato, Elitch, Lambourn, Lehrer, Maler, and Spano.
