= Sarah Cornelia Seward =

- Born: June 8, 1833; Florida, New York, US
- Died: 12th June, 1891; Allahabad, India
- Education: Troy Female Seminary, Woman's Medical College of Pennsylvania
- Occupation: Physician
- Organization: Presbyterian Women's Foreign Missionary Society
- Notable work: Sarah Seward Hospital

Sarah Cornelia Seward (June 8, 1833 – 12 June 1891) was the first female physician sent to India by the Presbyterian Women's Foreign Missionary Society in 1871. Seward's pioneering medical career was largely centered in Allahabad, India, where she initially served women in the zenana missions before opening a dispensary that expanded into a hospital. In a time when women were often denied access to healthcare, particularly in the conservative cultural settings of India, Seward's medical mission brought significant change.

== Early life and education ==
Formerly of Florida, Orange County, New York, Sarah Seward was the daughter of George Washington Seward, the youngest brother of United States Secretary of State, William Henry Seward. Gaining her preparatory school education at Troy Female Seminary; she later studied medicine at the Women's Medical College of Pennsylvania, obtaining her degree in December 1871. She wrote her graduation thirty page synopsis 'An Essay on Cholera'.

== Contributions to Furrukhabad mission ==
Seward was sent to Allahabad, India in 1871 under the Women's Union Missionary Society of New York. With a mission stationed at the junction of the Ganges and Jumna, she was joined by four native licentiate preachers and fifteen native assistants. She practiced among the Zenana mission serving the women of India. After two years, she transferred to the Board of Foreign Mission of the Presbyterian Church, continuing her work in the region. In March 1872, she started a small dispensary; following great success, this later developed into a large building. Following of which she began her short service in Calcutta where a smaller dispensary was also created. Due to ill health, Seward returned to New York in April 1889; however, she later returned the same year to continue her efforts in the area.

== Legacy and death ==
Seward died of cholera in Allahabad on 12 June 1891. Yet her impact in the region was profound due to her founding of the Allahabad dispensary. With great attendance of 3738 patients in 1890, the dispensary received a daily attendance of 44. Following her death, the dispensary was renamed the Sarah Seward Hospital.
