= Elizabeth Reifsnyder =

American physician

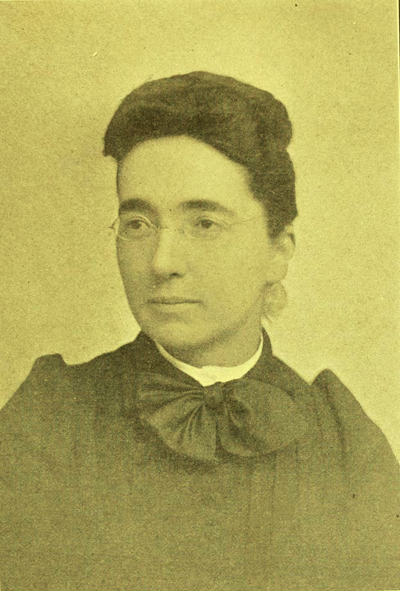
Elizabeth Reifsnyder, M.D. (History of Perry County, Pennsylvania, 1922)

Martha Elizabeth Reifsnyder (17 January 1858 – 3 February 1922) was an American physician, surgeon, teacher, and missionary. Early in her career, she was the only woman physician native to Perry County, Pennsylvania. She served as medical missionary in China, and opened the first woman's hospital in Shanghai, the Margaret Williamson Hospital. The Elizabeth Reifsnyder Hospital was a maternity building, the first one in China. Reifsnyder is remembered for performing "the first ovarian cyst operation by an American woman physician on a Chinese woman". She became internationally known after removing a 33-pound ovarian cyst from one of her Chinese patients.

== Early years ==
Reifsnyder was born in Liverpool, Pennsylvania in 1858, the daughter of John and Nancy Musselman Reifsnyder. There were six siblings. After her studies in the Liverpool schools, she entered the Millersville State Normal School (renamed Millersville University of Pennsylvania), where she graduated. She then entered the Woman's Medical College of Pennsylvania, where she graduated in 1881, at the age of 23. She served as an intern for one year, and left for China in 1883, where most of her life was spent.

== Career ==
Reifsnyder arrived in Shanghai in the early part of 1883, and immediately after her arrival, people flocked to her. She established a dispensary in the city, opened three times a week, and she sometimes had as many as 100 patients in a day at that dispensary. She opened the first woman's hospital in Shanghai, under the auspices of the Woman's Union Missionary Society, and spent over three decades there (1883–1914). Interdenominational, it was known as the Margaret Williamson Hospital. The work was begun in a temporary building, and the hospital was built in 1885 from plans drawn by Reifsnyder herself. Previous to this she had been doing medical work in a neighboring area of Shanghai.

Reifsnyder was a noted surgeon. Among her patients was Mrs. Wu Tingfang, wife of the Chinese Ambassador to the US. When the 25th anniversary of the hospital was celebrated, press dispatches told that 800,000 patients had already been treated there, and that during the preceding year, 820 hospital in-patients had been treated, with 56,700 others as office patients. She left China about 1914 to come home for a visit, but owing to her health was never able to return. She left in China a large sum of money which she had received for services, and with these funds the Woman's Union Missionary Society erected a maternity building, the first one in China, and named it in her honor, the Elizabeth Reifsnyder Hospital. She died in Liverpool from heart disease in 1922, aged 64.

== Bibliography ==
- American Medical Association (1922). The Journal of the American Medical Association (Public domain ed.). American Medical Association.
- American Presbyterian Mission (1922). The Chinese Recorder (Public domain ed.). American Presbyterian Mission Press.
- Shemo, Connie A. (16 October 2011). The Chinese Medical Ministries of Kang Cheng and Shi Meiyu, 1872-1937: On a Cross-Cultural Frontier of Gender, Race, and Nation. Rowman & Littlefield. ISBN 978-1-61146-085-8.
- Foster, Arnold (1889). Christian Progress in China: Gleanings from the Writings and Speeches of Many Workers (Public domain ed.). Religious Tract Society. p. 191.
- Hain, Harry Harrison (1922). History of Perry County, Pennsylvania: Including Descriptions of Indians and Pioneer Life from the Time of Earliest Settlement, Sketches of Its Noted Men and Women and Many Professional Men (Public domain ed.). Hain-Moore Company. p. 716.
- United States Navy (1915). United States Naval Medical Bulletin (Public domain ed.). U.S. Government Printing Office.
- Wang, Xiuyun (2003). Stranger Bodies: Women, Gender, and Missionary Medicine in China, 1870s-1930s. University of Wisconsin--Madison.
