= Josephine C. Lawney =

American physician (1881–1962)

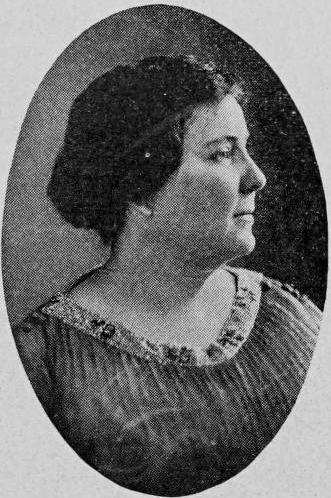
- Josephine C. Lawney, from a 1919 publication.
- Born: Josephine Carrier Lawney; April 29, 1881; Chicago, Illinois
- Died: February 27, 1962 (aged 80); New York

Josephine Carrier Lawney (April 29, 1881 – February 27, 1962) was an American physician, college administrator, and Baptist medical missionary in China. She was dean of the Women's Christian Medical College in Shanghai.

== Early life ==
Josephine Carrier Lawney was born in Chicago and raised in Readsboro, Vermont, the daughter of Josephine Rosella Carrier Laughna and James E. Laughna. Both parents were born in New England. (The names Laughna and Lawney were pronounced similarly; Josephine and her sister Letty Jane used the latter spelling.) Her mother died when Josephine was fifteen years old, and the Lawney girls were raised by relatives named Crosier. She worked at a chair factory in Vermont to support herself and her college education. She earned her medical degree at the Woman's Medical College of Pennsylvania in 1916.

== Career ==
Lawney worked at the Pittsburgh Tuberculosis Hospital after medical school. She was commissioned by the Woman's American Baptist Foreign Mission Society as a missionary in 1919, and assigned to the Margaret Williamson Hospital and the Women's Christian Medical College in Shanghai from 1919 to 1943. She became a professor and dean of the medical school. She learned to speak Mandarin, and studied tuberculosis, beri-beri, and anemia in China. In 1925, she attended a conference at Johns Hopkins University on "America's Relations with China." After celebrating her fiftieth birthday in Shanghai, she took a study furlough in the United States from 1931 to 1933.

During war with Japan, she treated refugees in a camp near Shanghai. When the United States entered World War II, Lawney was interned as an enemy alien from 1941 to 1943, and worked as a physician in the prison camp. She returned to the United States in 1943, and spoke about her internment experience, while also studying at Columbia University. From 1946 to 1948, she was back in China to establish a medical service, until missionaries were no long allowed.

Back in the United States, from 1948 to her retirement in 1955, she worked at the Associated Missions Medical Office, and helped to found a Baptist church on Long Island.

== Personal life ==
Lawney was a close friend of Margaret Treat Doane, the daughter of hymn writer William Howard Doane. In 1948, her hometown church in Readsboro, Vermont, dedicated a plaque honoring her missionary work. Lawney died in 1962, aged 80 years, at a hospital in New York City, after several months of illness. Her grave is in Heartwellville, Vermont.
