= Bakerstown, Pennsylvania =

Unincorporated community in Pennsylvania, US

- Census-designated place
- Location in Allegheny County and state of Pennsylvania
- Coordinates: 40°39′04″N 79°56′04″W
- Country: United States
- State: Pennsylvania
- County: Allegheny
- Township: Richland

Area
  - Total: 2.43 sq mi (6.29 km^{2})
  - Land: 2.43 sq mi (6.29 km^{2})
  - Water: 0 sq mi (0.00 km^{2})

Population (2020)
  - Total: 2,745
  - Density: 1,130.6/sq mi (436.54/km^{2})
- Time zone: UTC-5 (Eastern (EST))
  - Summer (DST): UTC-4 (EDT)
- ZIP code: 15007
- Area code: 724
- FIPS code: 42-03864

Bakerstown is a census-designated place within Richland Township in Allegheny County, Pennsylvania, United States. As of the 2020 census, it had a population of 2,745. Despite Bakerstown's small size, there are a few shops located within the settlement. Bakerstown is also home to the Richland Township Community Park.

== Demographics ==
Historical population
Census	Pop.	Note	%±
2010	1,761		—
2020	2,745		55.9%
U.S. Decennial Census

== Education ==
Bakerstown is located in Pine-Richland School District near the border of Deer Lakes School District. Students K-3 in Bakerstown go to Richland Elementary, students 4-6 go to Eden Hall Upper Elementary, students 7-8 go to Pine-Richland Middle School, and students 9-12 attend Pine-Richland High School.

== Notable person ==
- Lizzie M. Guthrie (1838–1880), missionary
