= Mina MacKenzie =

Jemima "Mina" MacKenzie (August 18, 1872 – January 27, 1957) was a Canadian Christian medical missionary to India.

== Life ==
A daughter of farmers Simon and Ann (Murray) MacKenzie, she was born August 18, 1872, in Waterside, Pictou County, Nova Scotia, Canada; she was the youngest of 14 children. MacKenzie led her class in surgery and graduated from Dalhousie University in 1904 as one of the university's earliest female doctors.

After working in Boston to raise tuition money to enable her sister Molly to also complete a medical degree from Dalhousie, MacKenzie left America in September 1904 and traveled to India to work as a medical missionary with the Women’s Union Missionary Society of America. In 1909, MacKenzie established the Broadwell Christian Hospital in Fatehpur, Uttar Pradesh, where she and her sister Mary worked for many years. MacKenzie's tireless efforts helped control the cholera epidemic during the 1917 Kumbh Mela pilgrimage.

MacKenzie returned to Canada in 1920 to nurse her father; after his death in 1922, she returned to India to work with the 44 children who she had adopted during her time there.

MacKenzie dedicated over three decades to provide medical services to the poor and sick in India. In 1919, she was awarded the Kaiser-i-Hind Medal for Public Service in India and in 1940, Dalhousie University awarded her an honorary LLD degree.

== Legacy ==
The Dr Mina MacKenzie Memorial Trust Fund was set up to fund the Broadwell Christian Hospital and other healthcare in the area.
