= Andrew Stritmatter =

American missionary (1847–1880)

Reverend Andrew Stritmatter (33 October 1847 – 22 November 1880) was a missionary with the Methodist Episcopal Church in China from 1867 to 1880. He served The North China Mission. His spouse, Dr. Lucinda L. Combs Stritmatter, was the first physician assigned to China by the Women's Foreign Ministry Society. They married in 1877. Reverend Stritmatter had two sons both of whom were born abroad in China. He died in Denver, Colorado after traveling home to Ohio following an infection of tuberculosis. His grave is located in Denver, Colorado.

== Early life ==
Andrew Stritmatter was born to Methodist parents Thomas and Margaret Stritmatter in Pennsylvania on October 31, 1847. When he was a young boy, his parents relocated their family to Ohio. He enrolled at Ohio State University. At Ohio State, the Reverend Mr. Brown, a missionary of many years in India, came to speak and upon hearing his lecture, Stritmatter was convinced of his calling to missionary work.

== Missionary life ==
=== Appointment ===
In 1872, he met with Bishop I.W Wiley whom he asked for approval to serve as a missionary in China. The mission appointed him to Jiujiang, China thereafter. He embarked on his journey on June 5, 1873 from San Francisco accompanied by other missionaries. On the journey he met Lucinda Combs, who had been appointed by the Women's Foreign Missionary Society (Philadelphia) to Peking, China and who would later become his wife. Once he arrived, he quickly began learning the language, and began his evangelical duties. He preached regularly and distributed scriptures in the surrounding areas. Towards the end of his commission, he focused heavily on translating and preparing books for his mission.

=== Relationships ===
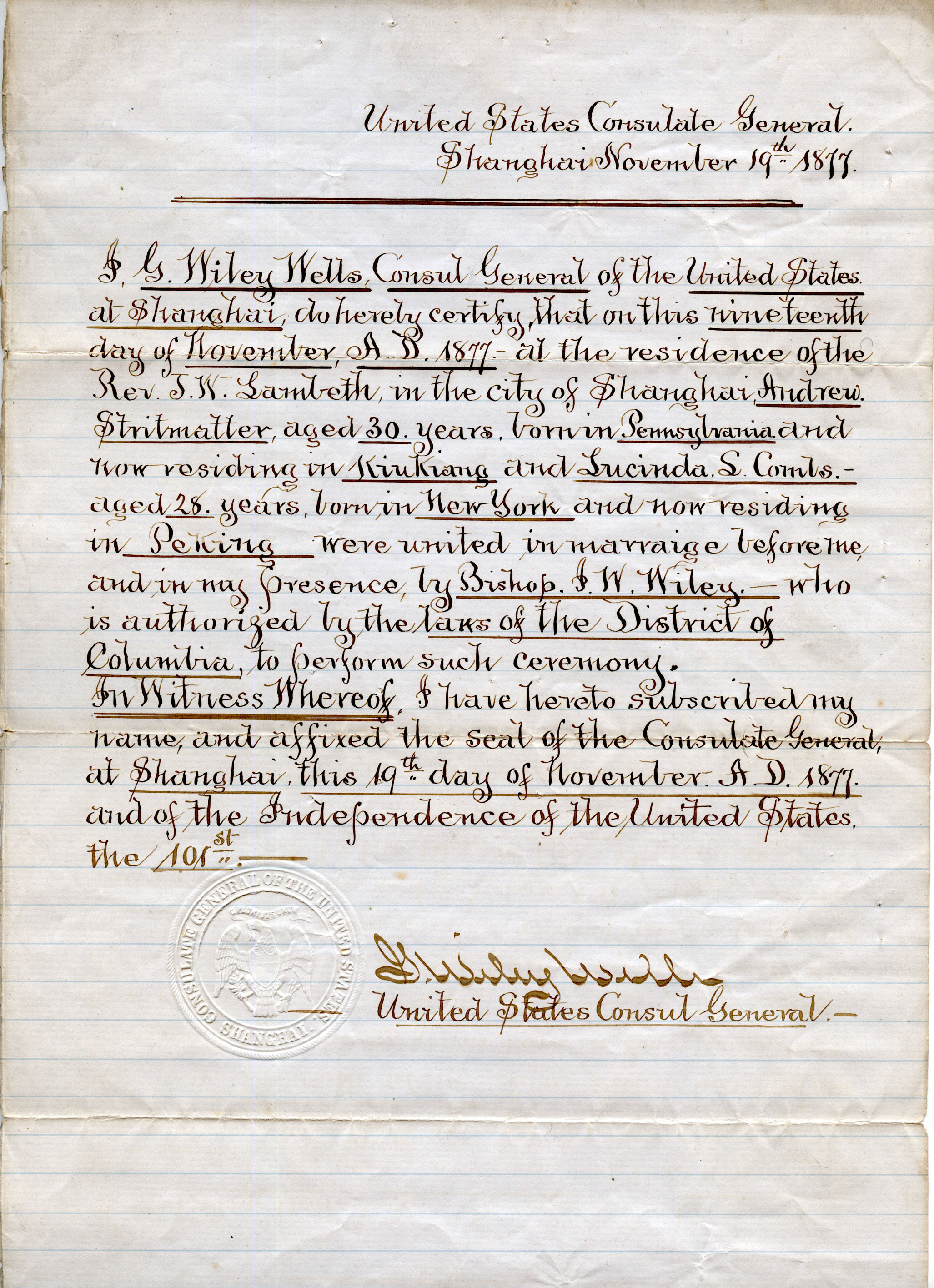
Andrew Stritmatter and Lucinda Combs Wedding Certificate, November 19 1877, Shanghai, China

Stritmatter met and started a relationship with his future wife while traveling on a missionary ship. Due to her commission as a missionary, however, they were not able to continue their relationship and were separated upon arrival in China. After Lucinda's contract with the Women's Foreign Missionary Society came to a close, the couple, who had stayed in contact after their separation, married on November 19, 1877, in Shaughai. Shortly following the union, the new couple moved to Stritmatter's station in Jiujiang. The Stritmatter's had two sons, Albert and Edward, both of whom were born in China.

== Death ==
After contracting tuberculosis, Reverend Stritmatter was advised to return to his home in the states. In October 1880, the family began their journey to Reverend Stritmatter's family home in Ohio. He did not finish the journey home and died on November 22, 1880, in Denver, Colorado, at just 33 years old. His grave can be visited at Riverside Cemetery in Denver, Colorado.
