= Catherine Bonney =

American missionary

Catherine Bonney (née Van Rensselaer; December 23, 1817 – June 29, 1891) was a pioneering American missionary who established a boarding school in Macao that supported young, impoverished girls, despite the opposition she faced from her larger missionary organization. Following her husband's death, she traveled to Peking under the Woman's Union Missionary Society and founded a second school; this trip marked the first time that women were sent to the mission field alone. She went on to create the Eurasian school at Shanghai, which was the first secondary school aimed to provide education for mixed-race orphans at Shanghai.

== Early life ==
Catherine Van Rensselaer, a member of the third generation of the prominent Dutch-American Van Rensselaer family, was born in New York in 1817. Her parents were Solomon van Rensselaer and Harriet van Rensselaer. She graduated from the Albany Female Academy in 1834, a high school for girls founded in 1814. She married Rev. Samuel William Bonney on July 25, 1856, in Cherry Hill, Albany, New York.

== First Mission Trip (1856–1867) ==
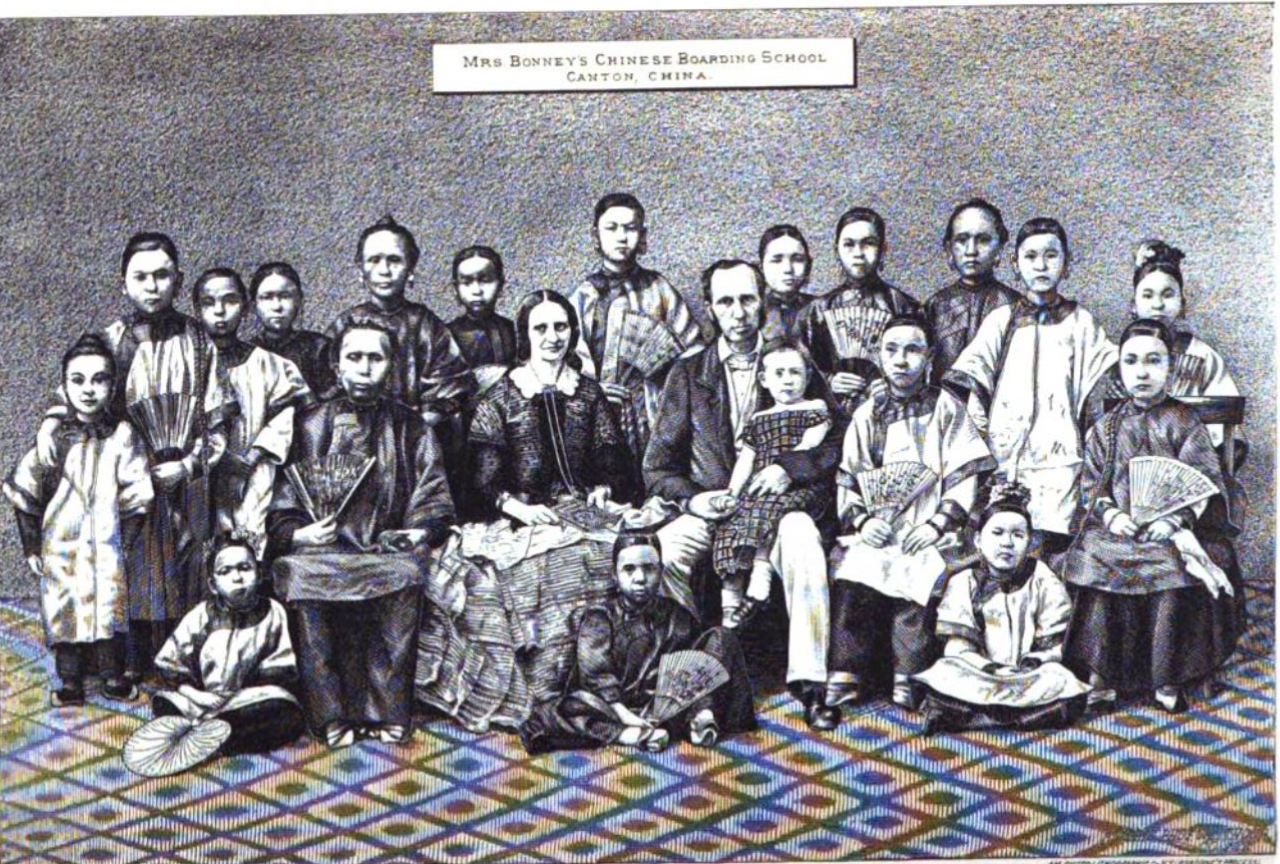
Catherine Bonney and various of her boarding school pupils, who she lists and describes by name in her work A Legacy of Historical Gleanings, Volume 2.

In August 1856, the Bonneys embarked on a journey to Canton under the American Board of Commissioners for Foreign Missions (ABCFM). The couple was affected by the turmoil of the Second Opium War shortly after their arrival in Canton, as Chinese antagonism toward foreigners was intense. Following a large fire in Canton, the American missionaries dispersed between Macao and Hongkong. The Bonneys stayed in Macao for about two years and then moved back to Canton.

After realizing how few schools served women, Catherine Bonney decided to spearhead an initiative and create an all-girls school in Macao. As she recounts in her text,

"Two and one half months from the day of landing, I began my ‘Chinese girl’s boarding school,’ with the full consent and approbation of Mr. Bonney, though the other missionaries thought it unwise, as we were likely any moment to be driven from Macao. The first year my school of nine girls were supported entirely from our own private resources, with the exception of such donations as generous friends sometimes contributed.”

Bonney's school accepted impoverished children and provided them with resources including food and clothing. Many of them converted to Christianity and remained within the school until they were married (or died). The school was taught in Chinese and emphasized literacy, as well as domestic skills such as needle-work. It consistently taught 43 girls but reached a maximum of 67.

In 1860, the Bonneys adopted an infant who they named Emma; she received most of her education in Albany. Samuel William Bonney died of bilious fever at Canton on July 27, 1864. However, Catherine Bonney remained in Canton for two and a half more years to monitor her school. She was the last member of the ABCFM in Canton for over a year. In 1868, the ABCFM reversed their rule (which was not strictly enforced) that single women could not travel alone as missionaries.

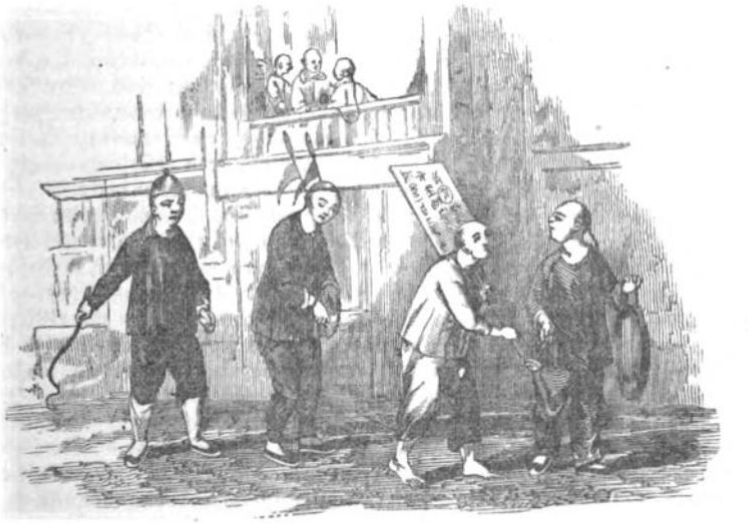
Depiction of public whipping in China also found in Bonney's text

Throughout her first mission trip, Bonney also became fascinated with Chinese culture. She collected watercolor paintings that depicted various aspects of Chinese life, from crafts, to foot binding, to the “Chinese Punishments."

== Second Mission Trip (1869–1871) ==
Due to health issues, in 1867, Bonney decided to return to America. She spent her time teaching students in Bedford, Pennsylvania. She was called upon by the Woman's Union Missionary Society to speak at various meetings, including one at Binghamton, New York, where she recounted her experience thus far as a missionary in China. In January 1869, she decided to return to China and was involved in the opening of a boarding school for girls in Peking.

In 1870, she also was responsible for spearheading the Eurasian School, which existed in other regions and was in demand in Shanghai; she gathered the necessary funds through donation and created an institution that supported "twelve boarders and twenty day scholars."

== Legacy ==
In 1871, as a result of another serious illness, she returned to the United States and resided in Albany. In 1875, she published the work “A Legacy of Historical Gleanings,” which is found in two volumes. The first volume describes events from the Revolutionary War through the completion of the Erie Canal (1817) and includes various correspondences between members of the Van Rensselaer family and other influential political figures. The second volume wraps up the Van Rensselaer story and then goes on to describe her experiences in China (as well as those of her husband). Bonney's text explains her motivations behind her missionary work and her love for the students she supported. It also provides an American audience a glimpse into Chinese culture and life.

Later, Bonney moved to Hickory, North Carolina, where she was president of "Claremont College for Girls", a women's college created to supplement the all male Catawba College. Claremont closed in 1915 after Catawba became co-educational in 1890. Claremont High School Historic District and Claremont High School are made up of the former Claremont College campus. Bonney died in Hickory in 1891, aged 73.
