= Lizzie M. Guthrie =

American missionary (1838–1880)

Personal life
- Born: Elizabeth M. Guthrie; 1838 Bakerstown, Allegheny County, Pennsylvania, U.S.
- Died: May 15, 1880 (aged 41–42) San Francisco, California, U.S.
- Resting place: Allegheny Cemetery
- Known for: first missionary of the Woman's Foreign Missionary Society of the Methodist Protestant Church

Religious life
- Religion: Christianity
- Profession: missionary

Senior posting
- Previous post: India and Japan under the auspices of the Woman's Union Missionary Society of New York

Lizzie M. Guthrie (1838 – May 15, 1880) was a 19th-century American Christian missionary. Initially affiliated with the Woman's Union Missionary Society of New York, she began providing services in India and Japan in 1868. While on furlough back in the U.S., in 1879, she helped establish the Woman's Foreign Missionary Society of the Methodist Protestant Church. Selected by the new organization to be its first foreign missionary, Guthrie died in 1880 en route to her assignment in Japan.

== Early life and education ==
Elizabeth (nickname, "Lizzie") M. Guthrie was born in Bakerstown, Allegheny County, Pennsylvania, 1838, a village about 18 miles (29 km) north of Pittsburgh. Her father, the Rev. Joseph Guthrie, D. D., was a minister in the Reformed Presbyterian Church, and cousin of the celebrated Dr. Thomas Guthrie, of Scotland. Her mother died when she was but two days old. She was then placed in the charge of her grandfather, Joseph Coskey, who cared for and educated her.

In 1861, she was adopted by an aunt, Mrs. McClurg, and removed to Philadelphia, where she enjoyed every comfort and even luxury, and became a fashionable young lady.

But a change came over her, and she dedicated herself to God. She was converted under the ministry of Thomas H. Stockton in Philadelphia, where Brother Stockton served for so many years as pastor at an Independent church, and Guthrie knew perhaps nothing of the Methodist Protestant Church, of which Stockton was a minister.

== Career ==
=== India ===
Guthrie's attention was soon turned to the subject of missions, and, after due deliberation, she made up her mind to go out as a missionary in the foreign field. In 1868, Guthrie's services were secured by the Woman's Union Missionary Society of New York, and she was sent out as a missionary to India. The climate of India, however, did not suit her.

=== Japan ===
Her health soon gave way, and at the end of a few years, her fellow missionaries deemed it advisable that she should return home. Her friends were advised of her purpose, but were also informed that but little, if any, hope was considered that she would live to reach her native land. Contrary to expectation, however, the sea voyage proved beneficial; Guthrie's strength began to return; and when she reached Japan, the improvement in her condition was very marked. She was urged by the missionaries of the Woman's Union Board there to remain a few months until her health should be fully restored, which she accepted. At length, having entirely recovered from her illness, and her services being needed in Japan, she entered actively into the mission work, under the direction of the Union Board, and remained there for six years.

During her stay in Japan, the funds of the Union Board were taxed, and she was directed not to receive any more girls into her school, as there were no means available for their support. Contrary, however, to this direction, she did admit two girls for whom no provision could be made. She felt that she could not reject them. The Woman's Union Board presented a way through which they could carry out their purpose, and it was soon reported that the Methodist Protestant Church had made provision for the support of two girls. Guthrie regarded this as a direct answer to her prayers. As a consequence, her attention was turned to the Methodist Protestant Church, and she was anxious to learn something more about it.

== Furlough ==
Guthrie aided the women of the Woman's Society of the Methodist Protestant Church by her counsels and efforts, and during the year subsequent to them organizing the Woman's Foreign Missionary Society of the Methodist Protestant Church, Guthrie visited some of the church's Conferences, to promote the new society's interests.

During the society's first year, Guthrie met frequently with ir, encouraging with her suggestions and aiding in organizing auxiliaries. Her health having improved, she expressed her willingness to go to Japan and establish the work of the Society. But with only US$300 in the treasury, the society shrank from the undertaking.

The first anniversary meeting of the Woman's Foreign Missionary Society of the Methodist Protestant Church was held in the First Church, Pittsburgh, February 19, 1880. Neither the Board of Missions nor the Woman's Society were financially prepared alone to send out a missionary. But they discussed the propriety of the two organizations uniting for the time being in sending out and supporting a missionary, until they should be able to engage separately in the work. After being sanctioned by the Board of Mission, Guthrie was appointed the organization's first missionary to a foreign land, to represent the General Board of Missions, and also the Woman's Society. The Woman's Society agreed to pay Guthrie's salary, and the Board agreed to meet her other expenses. As soon as convenient, the necessary arrangements were made, and April 23, 1880, was fixed upon as the time of Guthrie's departure.

== Death and legacy ==
Guthrie left Pittsburgh on April 23, 1880, and traveled cross-country on a train to San Francisco, California. She intended taking the steamer that sailed from San Francisco to Japan, on May 10, but not having entirely completed her arrangements, she decided to wait for the steamer which was to sail on May 22.

In the meantime, Guthrie became ill. When she found she was about to die, Guthrie hurriedly made a will, and left her money and effects, including her library in Japan, to the Woman's Society of the Methodist Protestant Church.

Lizzie M. White died at the home of a relative in San Francisco on May 15, 1880. Her body was brought back to Pennsylvania and buried at Allegheny Cemetery.

Guthrie's will was found after her death to be informal, and not legally binding; but her brother, Dr. Hugh L. Guthrie, of Sparta, Illinois, carried out his sister's wishes, and saw that her effects were disposed of according to her will.
