= Ellen Huntly Bullard Mason =

American Baptist foreign missionary and writer

Ellen Huntly Bullard Mason (12 January 1817 – 3 August 1894) was an American Baptist foreign missionary and writer. The founder of the Woman's Union Missionary Society of America for Heathen Lands, she was the first woman in the US to sign an agreement to institute a union effort by women, independent of denominational control, to bring the Gospel to the zenanas of India.

== Early years ==
Ellen Huntly was born in Brattleboro, Vermont, in 1817. In early youth, she was the companion of her father, "Elder" Huntly, in his visits through his parish in the hilly districts of Northern Vermont and New Hampshire, and the adjacent parts of southern Canada. Rev. S. Huntly was later the pastor of the Baptist church in Sanbornton, New Hampshire.

Her favorite book was the letters of Ann Judson, the wife of a Christian missionary out in Burma. Mason read about their many dangers and sufferings. Dr. Judson was still alive at this time, and it was Mason's wish to join him in his work. Her father and mother were so poor that they could not afford to send her away to school. What she could teach herself she did. She borrowed a geography book, and studied it while she washed dishes. She gave all her spare time to reading, and saved towards buying fresh books, and paying for her wished-for schooling.

She went a journey of some months, as a companion to a lady. One evening, she found in her room a missionary magazine. She opened it at the journal of Francis Mason, a missionary in Burma. After reading it, it re-inspired her old interest in Burma. When she got home, she told her father she had to go to Burma. Sufficient money had now been saved to send her to a boarding-school, and here she worked hard, dividing her time between learning and teaching, and always keeping the thought of Burma in her mind. Through the generosity of friends she was able to graduate at the Seminary for women in Utica, New York.

== Career ==
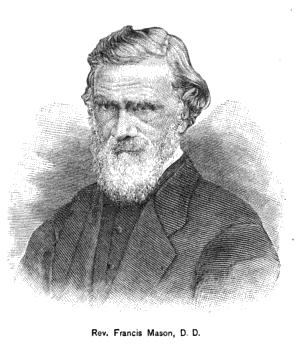
Francis Mason

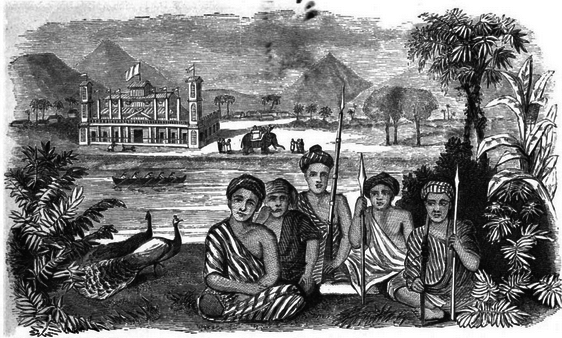
Karen National Institute for Girls

She soon married Rev. Edwin Bullard, and they sailed for Burma in 1843 to take up their life-work of proclaiming the Christian Faith to dying souls. The husband, who died in Moulmein of cholera in 1847, was a pioneer in introducing and establishing a self-sustaining ministry among the Karen people, and like most pioneers, he was obliged to endure, at first, reproaches from those who afterward praised and imitated him.

The young widow remained in Burma with her infant son. There, she met Dr. Francis Mason -she had read of his work as a young woman- who had been left a widower with a large family. He sought companionship with her, a bereft widow, as they were of "like faith and order".

After her marriage to Dr. Mason, she was associated successfully in the work among the Karens about Toungoo, acquiring much influence over the Karens. Later on, she entertained some peculiar ideas concerning the Karen language and the kingdom of God which did not receive the approval of the missionaries or of the management of the American Baptist Missionary Union, and she created a serious division among the Karen churches of Toungoo District. In her later years, she affiliated with the Church of England.

Mason made a long journey from Burma to America to evangelize Christian women to go and teach the Karens. She founded the Woman's Union Missionary Society of America for Heathen Lands, and established the Karen National Institute for Girls and the Karen Female Education Society.

After Dr. Mason's death in 1874, she moved to Rangoon and died on 3 August 1894. Her son, Rev. Edwin Bullard, became a missionary to the Telugus. A daughter, Ellen Bullard, married Capt. Bustard of the British Army, and after his death, she, too, became a missionary in India.

== Selected works ==
- A song of the famine (n.d.)
- A talk with the Ganges : or, An epithalamium on the first Hindu widow-marriage (1860)
- Tounghoo women : Ladies, will you approve or condemn? (1860)
- Civilizing mountain men : or, Sketches of mission work among the Karens (1862)
- Great expectations realized; or, Civilizing mountain men. (1862)
- Last days of the Rev. Francis Mason, D.D. (1874)
- A song of the famine, dedicated to the young folks of the Anglo-East Indian Community of Burma (1874)
- First difficulties in studying Pali, with a catalogue of Dr. and Mrs. Mason's library at the time of Mr. Mason's decease, and Dr. Mason's Essay on English in Pali and Christian moral science in Buddhism, also Mason on the future punishment of the Buddhists, &c. Passed through the press by Mrs. Eleanor Mason. The catalogue prepared in accordance with the requirements of Mrs. Mason's letters of administration (1875)
- The Mountain Karen Colony in Toungoo, Burma (1877)
- The origin of the Karens discovered (1877)
- The Toungoo God-language conspiracy (1877)
