= Leonora King =

Canadian physician and medical missionary

Leonora Howard King
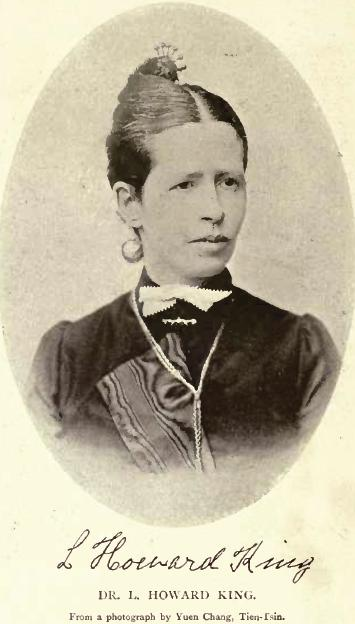
- Dr Leonora Howard King
- Born: April 17, 1851; Farmersville (now Athens), Canada West
- Died: June 30, 1925 (aged 74); Peitaiho, Zhili, Republic of China

Leonora Howard King (April 17, 1851 – June 30, 1925) was a Canadian physician and medical missionary who spent 47 years practising medicine in China. She was the first Canadian doctor to work in China, where she died in 1925.

== Early life and education ==
Leonora Annetta Howard was the daughter of Peter T. and Dorothy E. Howard. She was born in Lansdowne, County Leeds, Canada West (Ontario), March 17, 1851. She was raised in Farmersville (now Athens). She was educated in Athens, Ontario and in New York. She qualified for and served as a teacher.

King was unable to attend medical school in Canada and received her medical degree from the University of Michigan in 1876.

== Career ==
After joining the Women's Foreign Missionary Society of the American Methodist Episcopal Missionary Society, she left for China in 1877. In China, she was a missionary doctor with the American Methodist Episcopal Missionary Society in the northern Chinese province of Zhili. She took up her residence alongside Lucinda L. Combs, the first female physician to serve in China stationed by the Women's Foreign Missionary Society in Peking around August 1887. The pair worked together for three months before Miss Combs relocated to Jiujiang.

In August, 1879, King attended Lady Li, the wife of Viceroy of Zhili Li Hongzhang, then seriously ill, in Tianjin. On Lady Li's recovery, she remained in Tianjin, in practice with the use of a temple being given to her for the purpose. She founded, in Tianjin, the Methodist Episcopal Mission Hospital in 1880. In 1885 King opened a medical school for Chinese women and girls who had been educated in mission schools. In 1886, Lady Li built King another hospital, which was later known as Government Hospital for Women and Children, Tianjin. During the First Sino-Japanese War, Dr. Howard opened her hospital to wounded soldiers as opposed to women and children. At the close of the war, King the first Western woman, was made a Mandarin an honour of the Imperial Chinese Order of the Double Dragon.

In 1884, she married Rev. Alexander King, a member of the London Missionary Society.

== Awards ==
- In 2000, she was inducted into the Canadian Medical Hall of Fame.
- In 2004, she was inducted into the American Medical Women's Association’s International Women in Medicine Hall of Fame.
