= Lucinda L. Combs =

American physician and medical missionary (1849–1919)

- Born: October 10, 1849; Cazenovia, New York, US
- Died: April 23, 1919 (aged 69); Franklin County, Ohio, US
- Resting place: Union Cemetery, Columbus, Ohio
- Other names: Lucinda L. Combs-Stritmatter; Lucinda L. Coombs (common misspelling)
- Education: Women's Medical College
- Occupations: Physician and medical missionary
- Spouse: Andrew Stritmatter

Lucinda L. Combs-Stritmatter (October 10, 1849 – April 23, 1919) was an American physician who was the first female medical missionary to provide medical care in China. She is credited with establishing the first women's hospital in Beijing. Combs was a pioneer in women's medical care while serving the Women's Foreign Ministry Society's North China Mission for seven years.

== Early life ==
Perspective map of Cazenovia with list of landmarks published in 1890 by L.R. Burleigh

Lucinda Combs, known by her friends and family as "Lucy", was born on October 10, 1849, in Cazenovia, New York. She is not known to have had any siblings. Combs parents died leaving her orphaned at a young age. It is unknown through which means specifically, but she supported and educated herself following the tragedy. After converting to Christianity, she became a teacher. Combs learned about the Methodist Episcopal Church's work commissioned in India and felt called to that line of work herself. She ultimately decided to further educate herself in order to be prepared for an appointment as a missionary in India.

== Education ==
Combs enrolled in the Cazenovia Seminary in Cazenovia, New York in 1866. The Cazenovia Seminary, though not theological in its purpose, was a three-year program associated with the Methodist Episcopal Church. In 1869, Combs graduated with honors at the top of her class.

To finance her medical school education, Combs looked for domestic employment. She soon found a wealthy family that was willing to employ her. Combs worked as a domestic laborer while attending medical school.

In 1870, Combs enrolled at the Women's Medical College in Philadelphia, Pennsylvania. She drew the attention of a group of Methodist women in Philadelphia who helped her continue her studies. Combs earned her degree from the Women's Medical College on March 12, 1873.

== Career ==
=== Missionary work ===
Almost immediately upon receiving her medical degree, Combs was commissioned by the Women's Foreign Ministry Society (WFMS). Although she intended to serve in India, she boarded a ship for Beijing, China on June 5, 1873. Among the other passengers on the ship was Andrew Stritmatter who had been commissioned to work in Jiujiang. Stritmatter and Combs grew close during their voyage and would eventually marry. Combs departed from San Francisco, but her journey was delayed due to an illness. Her illness held her in Japan for several weeks before she was well enough to continue travel. She arrived in Beijing in late August or early September, almost three months after her original departure and quickly began her work. She is noted for being the first female medical missionary to provide medical care in China.

=== Establishing the first women's hospital ===
William Lockhart

Although medical attention had arrived in Beijing about ten years prior, through the London Missionary Society's appointment of William Lockhart, for the most part, medical services were not extended to women. Sex segregation restricted women from seeking medical care from men. After writing a letter expressing her desire to open a hospital to serve Chinese women, the Philadelphia branch of the WFMS congregated at the General Executive Committee meeting in May 1874. During their meeting, they agreed to set aside a $2000 fund toward the establishment of a hospital for women and children in Beijing. The land for the hospital and residence building was procured in December 1874.

The first patient treated in the Peking Woman's Hospital was a Chinese woman who had fallen and sustained a foot injury. After treating her, Combs recalled that the family was very grateful to her. In the five months following its completion in November 1875, the hospital treated 18 patients. Founding the first women's hospital in China gave Combs a platform to advocate for medical training and education for women and for the improvement of sanitary and hygiene practiced in relevant medical facilities. Although hesitant at first, the Chinese population in Beijing soon came to appreciate the medical help provided by a female physician.

=== Community care ===
During the building of the hospital, Combs treated Chinese women in their homes while learning the language. She made 198 home visits and treated 37 patients during throughout her first year in Beijing. In her first year, she prescribed for 314 cases. In addition to providing medical care, Combs made an effort to convert her patients to Christianity.

Combs' marriage to Andrew Strittmater in 1877 led to her relocation to Jiujiang. There, she took on the work of the physician and missionary, Miss Mason, who was leading the medical work in Jiujiang but had returned to the United States after becoming very ill. Combs treated many patients in Jiujiang and the surrounding area. Combs's medical experience and skill helped ease the transition of leadership following Miss Mason's quick illness.

== Later life and death ==
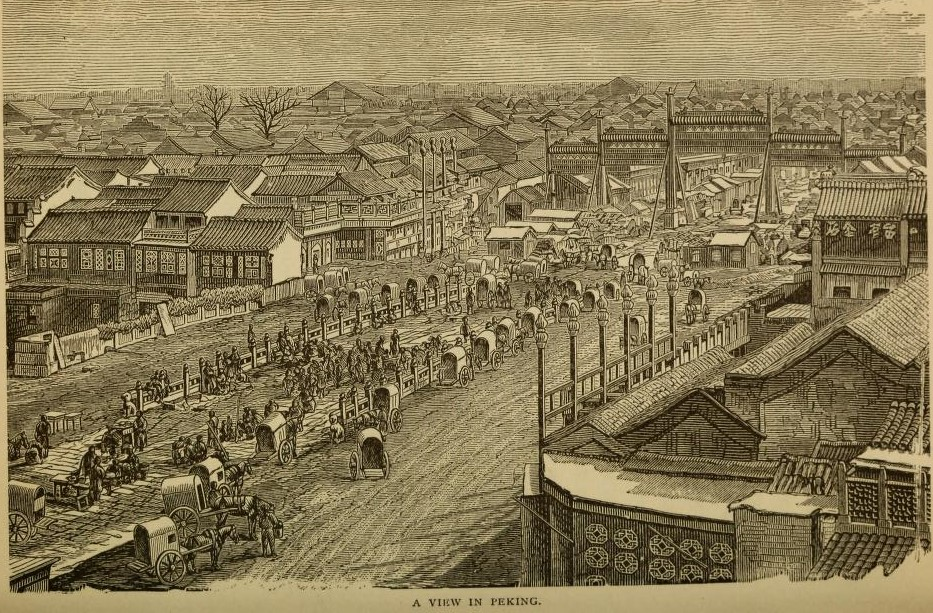
"A View in Peking" in 1877 from Rev. I. W. Wiley's account of his travels in China and Japan 1877– 1878. Combs accompanied Wiley from Beijing to Shanghai where she was married.

Combs met Andrew Stritmatter aboard a ship of missionaries that departed for China in 1873. As her five-year contract with the WFMS came to a close, Combs and Stritmatter were married in Shanghai on November 19, 1877, by Bishop I. W. Wiley. Soon after their marriage, the couple moved to Jiujiang in southern China. Although her marriage resulted in the end of her commission to the WFMS, Combs continued to practice medicine in her new location. The couple had two sons named Edward and Albert, both born in China.

About two years after their relocation, Stritmatter contracted tuberculosis, which led the couple to leave China for the United States in October 1880. The long journey resulted in Stritmatter's death one month later in Denver, Colorado. He died before arriving at his family home in Ohio. Combs remained in Colorado following her husband's death to raise her two children and continue practicing medicine. She never remarried.

After practicing medicine in Denver for six years, Combs moved to Columbus, Ohio to be close to her late husband's family and to spend the remainder of her days. She died in her son's home on April 23, 1919, in Franklin County, Ohio at the age of 69 years old. She was buried at Union Cemetery in Columbus, Ohio.

== Legacy ==
Three months prior to her marriage, Combs was joined at her mission station by Leonora King. The pair of physicians worked alongside each other for three months before Combs relocated to Jiujiang with her husband. King consequently took over her responsibilities as the primary physician at the Woman's hospital. In 1879, Leonora King successfully treated the wife of Li Hongzhang, Viceroy of Zhili. The connection between King and the powerful family of the Viceroy resulted in the funding and construction of a surgery unit and medical dispensary.

== Publications ==
Combs published many works during her studies and throughout her medical career. During her time at Women's Medical College of Pennsylvania, she published a 22-page handwritten thesis on the study of medical hysteria. Additionally, she wrote several pieces for the Women's Missionary Methodist Episcopal Church monthly newspaper called The Heathen Woman's Friend. In this, Combs published three distinct works describing her life as a missionary titled: "A Bright Day at the Peking Hospital", "The Peking Hospital", and "A Morning's Visit at the Peking Hospital".
