= Riverside Cemetery (Denver) =

- U.S. National Register of Historic Places
- U.S. Historic district
- Colorado State Register of Historic Properties
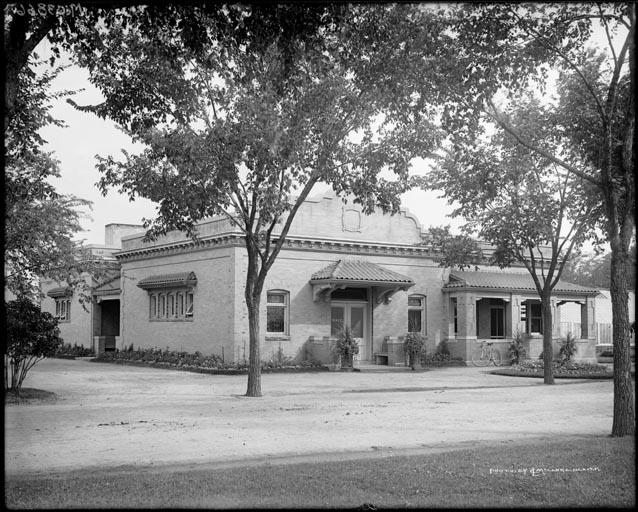
- The cemetery chapel, c. 1905

- Location within Colorado Location within the United States
- Location: 5201 Brighton Blvd., Denver, Colorado
- Coordinates: 39°47′39″N 104°57′33″W
- Architects: Edbrooke, Frank E.; Lowrie, Harvey C.
- Architectural style: Romanesque, Mission Revival
- NRHP reference No.: 94001253
- CSRHP No.: 5AM.125
- Added to NRHP: October 28, 1994

Riverside Cemetery, established in 1876, is Denver, Colorado's oldest operating cemetery. More than 67,000 people are buried there, including 1,000 veterans.

== Location and operation ==
Riverside Cemetery occupies a 77-acre (310,000 m^{2}) site between Brighton Boulevard and the east bank of the South Platte River, approximately four miles downstream from downtown Denver, Colorado. The majority of Riverside Cemetery lies within Adams County, Colorado; however, the rest of the cemetery, the cemetery's original entrance and administration building, are within the City and County of Denver.

Riverside Cemetery originally was the property of the Riverside Cemetery Association from its founding in 1876 until 1900 when the association's assets were transferred to the Fairmount Cemetery Association (presently known as Fairmount Cemetery Company). In late 2000, Fairmount Cemetery Company along with members of the community founded the Fairmount Heritage Foundation to be an educational resource for the community and to protect and preserve the heritage of both the company's properties: Riverside Cemetery and Fairmount Cemetery. The volunteers of the foundation staff the Riverside Cemetery Office on Tuesdays, Thursdays, Fridays (during the summer months) and Saturdays. They have numerous events and preservation and cleanup projects for the cemetery. Information may be found at www.fairmountheritagefoundation.org

== History ==
When first opened, the graveyard's secluded location on the banks of the South Platte River and the surrounding greenery made it a popular choice for wealthy families; the opening of the Burlington Railroad in the 1890s changed this, spurring industrial growth in the neighborhood, and some families chose to have their relatives' remains exhumed and reburied elsewhere. Prominent people continued to be interred there, with ornate headstones to mark their graves; however, the proportion of unmarked graves rose dramatically, as counties from all over the state sent the bodies of their impoverished dead citizens there. Riverside remained the area's most significant cemetery until the mid-20th century, and retains importance for scholars studying in the early history of Denver, as the city kept no systematic death records until 1910. Today, the neighborhood has become a largely industrial area, surrounded by a gas station, smokestacks, train tracks, and an industrial park, a few blocks from Interstate 70. It remains a minor tourist attraction; in 2001, 3,000 people went on walking tours of the site.

The cemetery's final grave site was assigned in July 2005; the management company, Fairmount Cemetery Inc., indicated that they would not accept further burials after that, because they were losing money on each sale. They have also stopped watering and cut back drastically on services, claiming that their $2.1 million endowment, which generated roughly $62,000 per year in interest, was not enough to water the property and properly maintain all the graves; their records show that they lost $159,000 in 2003. They still employ two groundskeepers to pick up trash, but have had to refuse offers of maintenance help from volunteers due to liability issues. In 2005, Fairmount approached the city government and requested they take over operation of the cemetery; however, the city was forced to decline due to lack of funds. Local residents, concerned by the dying trees and grass and generally poor state of the cemetery, formed a group, Friends of Historic Riverside Cemetery, to bring public attention to the issue. They requested the assistance of a Holy Transfiguration Orthodox Cathedral whose founders are buried there; Fairmount indicated that they would be willing to transfer the endowment and operations of the cemetery to a group that could provide an additional trust of $1 million to cover operating expenses.

== Notable burials ==
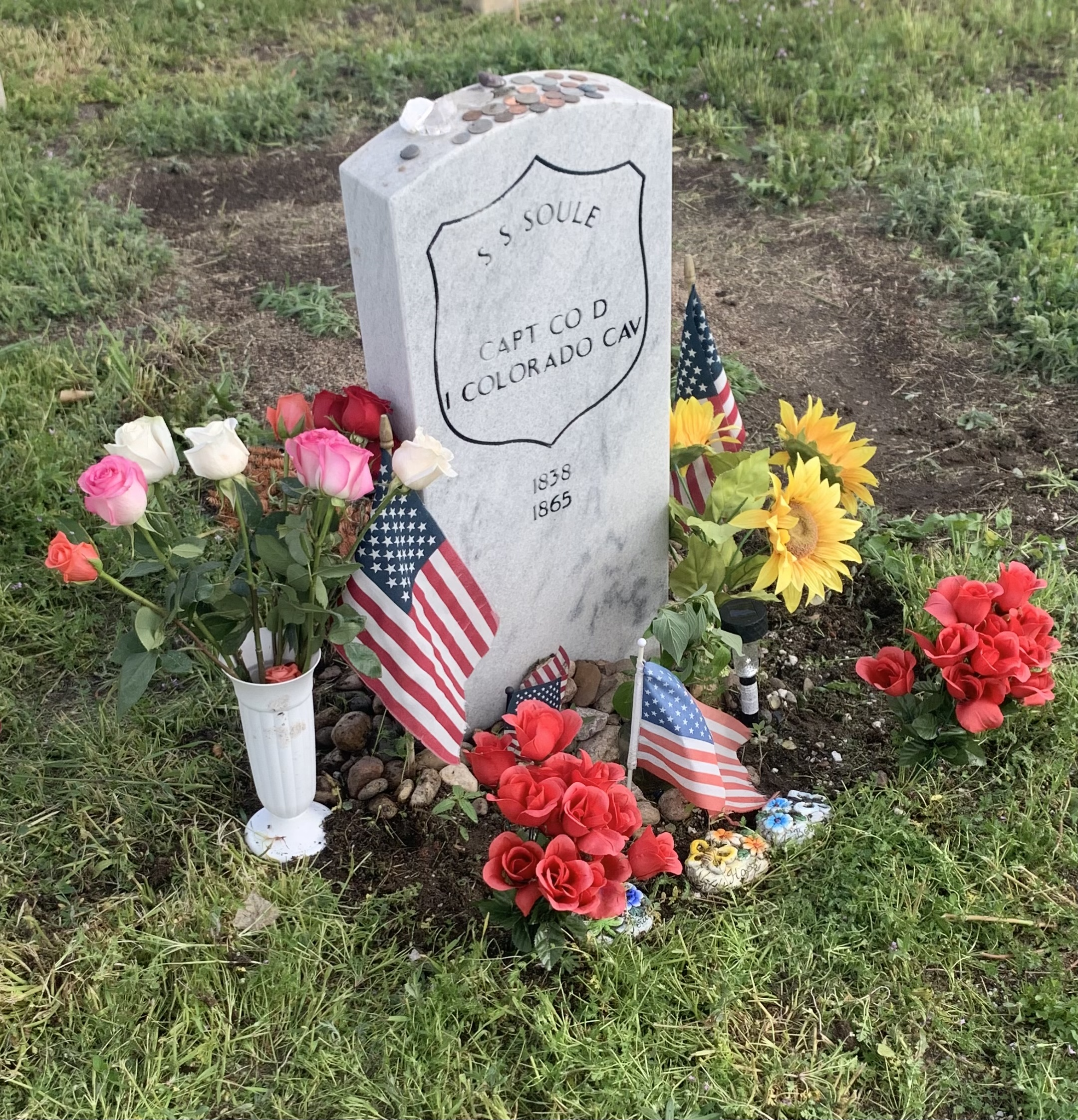
Grave of soldier and hero Silas Soule

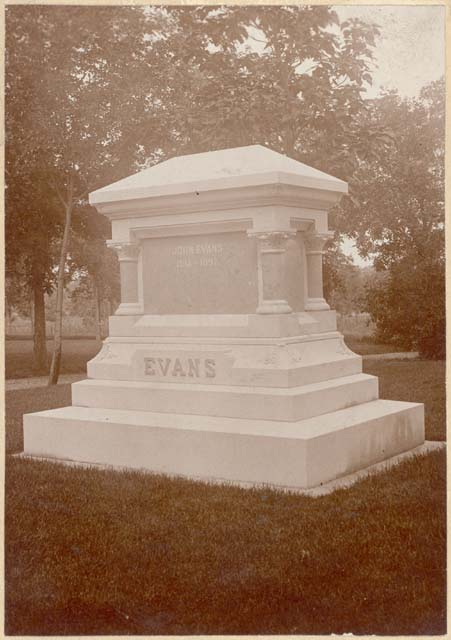
John Evans' grave marker

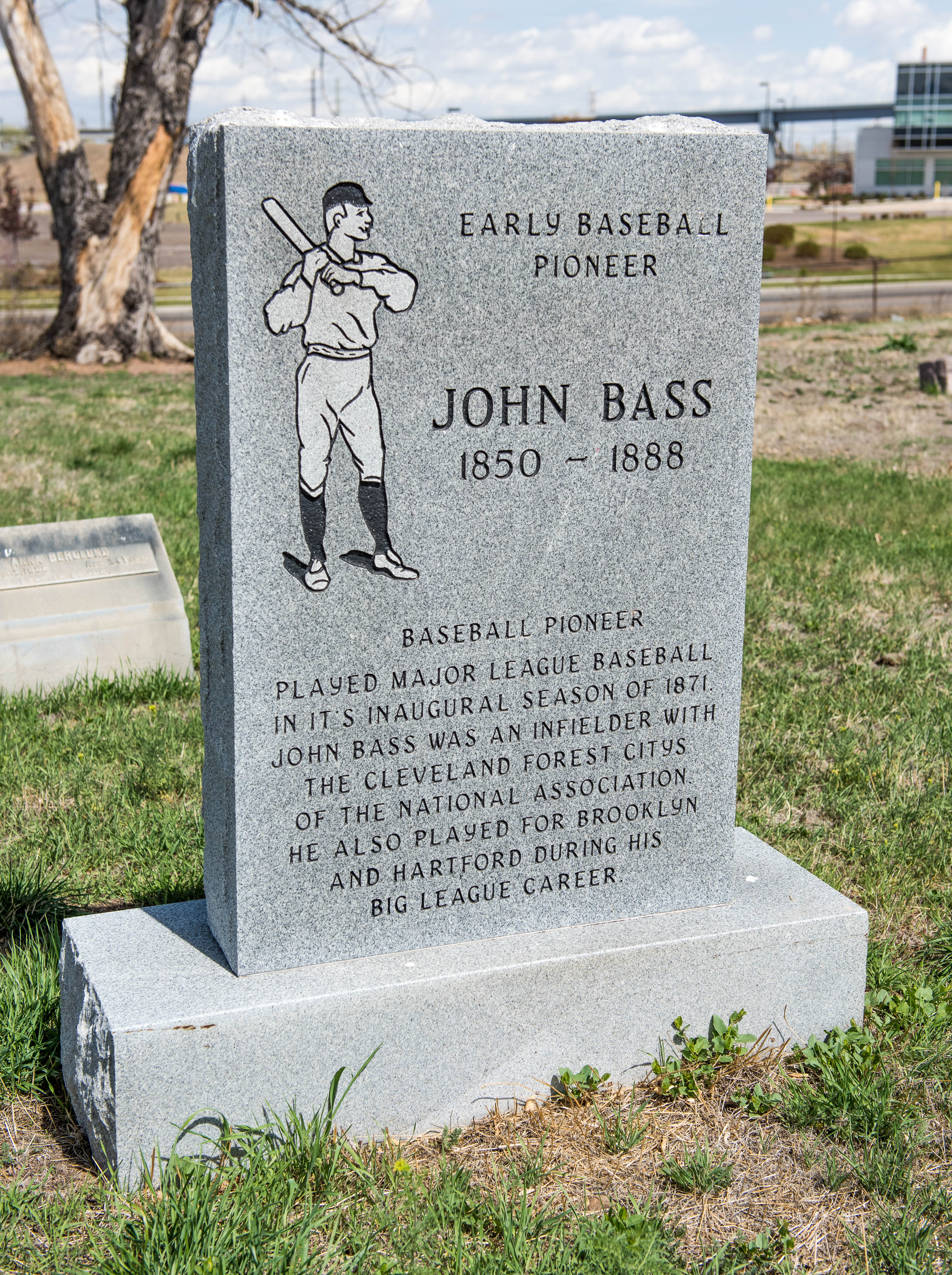
John Bass gravestone

Being Denver's oldest operating cemetery, Riverside serves as the final resting place for hundreds of local historical figures. There are three Medal of Honor recipients (Day, Hasting, and Kelley) buried there.

- John Bass (1848–1888), an early baseball pioneer, who was part of the first major league baseball season in 1871
- James B. Belford (1837–1910), U.S. Congressman and lawyer
- Thomas Belt (1832–1878), English naturalist
- Hiram Pitt Bennet (1826–1914), U.S. Congressman
- Henry P. H. Bromwell (1823–1903), U.S. Congressman from Illinois, prominent Freemason, Grand Master of Illinois, and delegate to the Colorado constitutional convention
- Clara Brown (c. 1803–1885), freed slave, first black woman in Colorado, and one of the founders of the St. James Methodist Church
- Chin Lin Sou (1837–1894), railroad foreman and early Chinese American community leader
- David Day (1847–1914), Medal of Honor recipient during the American Civil War
- Elizabeth Piper Ensley (1847–1919), suffragist
- John Evans (1814–1897), former Territory of Colorado governor
- Barney Ford (1822–1902), Business person
- George V. Kelley (1843–1905), received a Medal of Honor for capturing a Confederate flag during the American Civil War
- Oliver Marcelle (c. 1890–1949), first black baseball player in Colorado, buried in an unmarked grave
- Miguel Antonio Otero (1829–1882), prominent New Mexico politician
- Park Hee Byung (1871–1907), Korean independence activist and "founding father" of the state's Korean American community, grave unmarked until 2007
- John Long Routt (1826–1907), last territorial governor of Colorado, first state governor of Colorado, Denver mayor
- Jacob Schueler (1835–1918), co-founder of the Coors Brewery
- Richard Sopris (1813–1893), mayor of Denver (1878–1881)
- Silas Soule (1838–1865), soldier in the Colorado Cavalry who disobeyed Colonel John Chivington's orders to fire on defenseless Indians, and Silas's widow, Thersa A. "Hersa" Coberly Soule Lea (1846–1879).
- Andrew Stritmatter (1847–1880), American missionary with the Methodist Episcopal Church in China
- Augusta Tabor (1833–1895), Colorado pioneer and first wife of Horace Tabor.

== Gallery ==
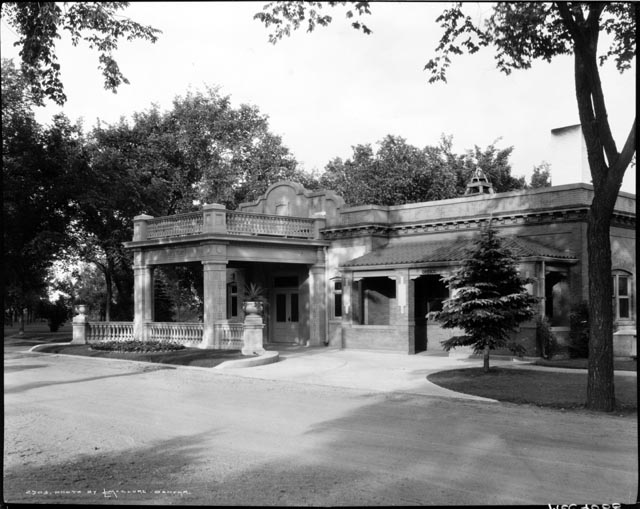
The cemetery office, c. 1935

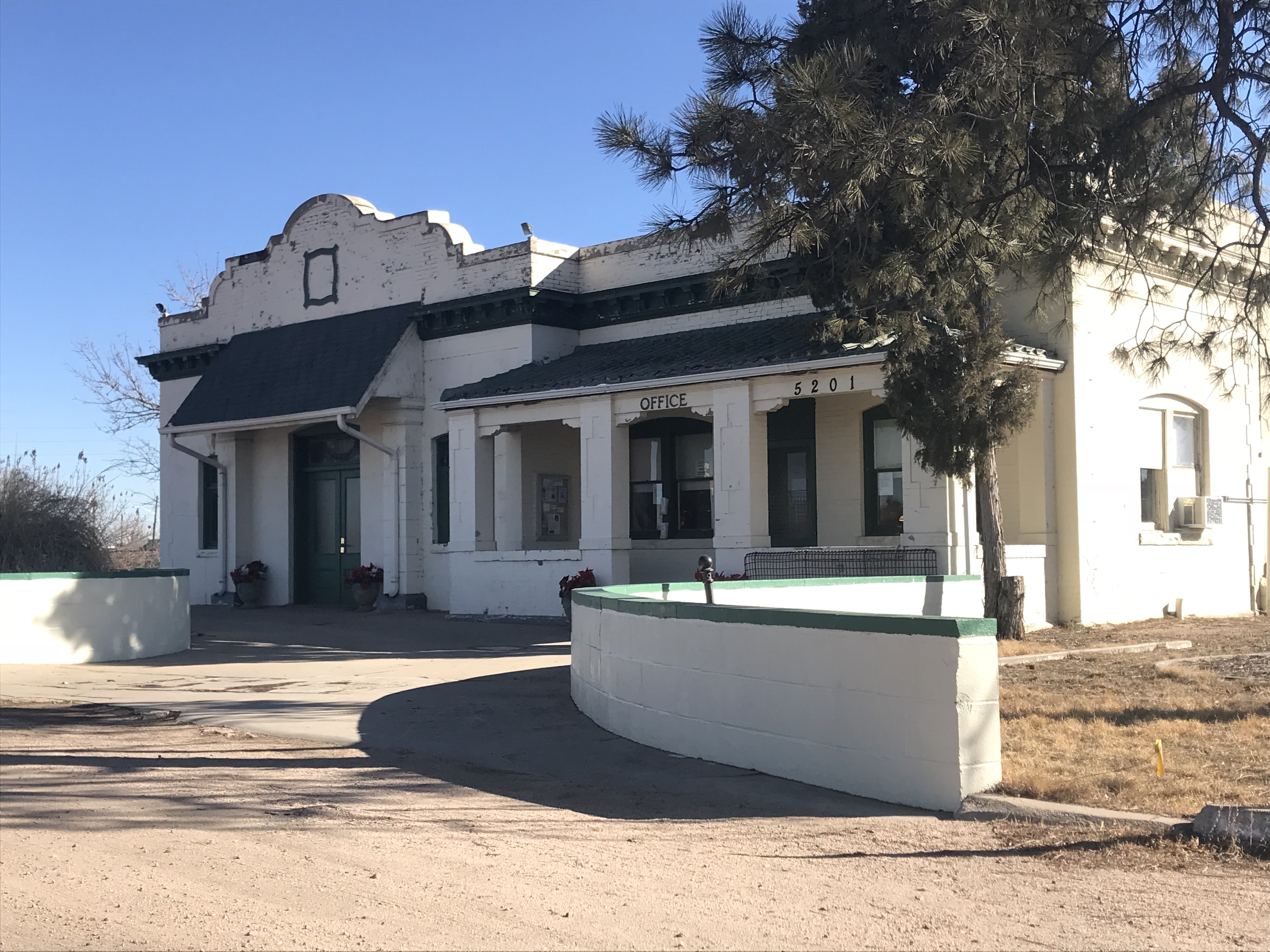
Edbrooke, Frank E.; Lowrie, Harvey C. 1

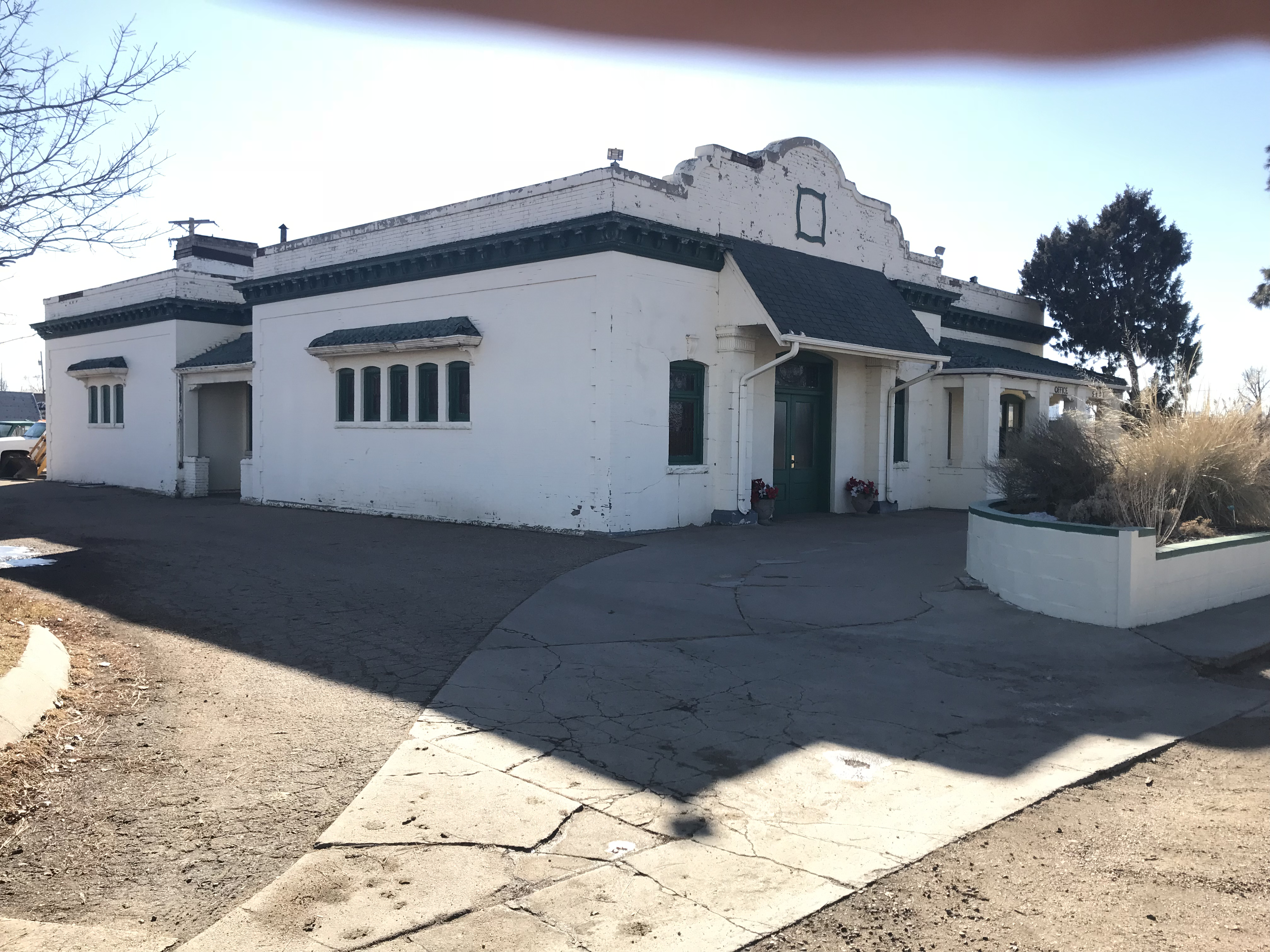
Edbrooke, Frank E.; Lowrie, Harvey C. 2

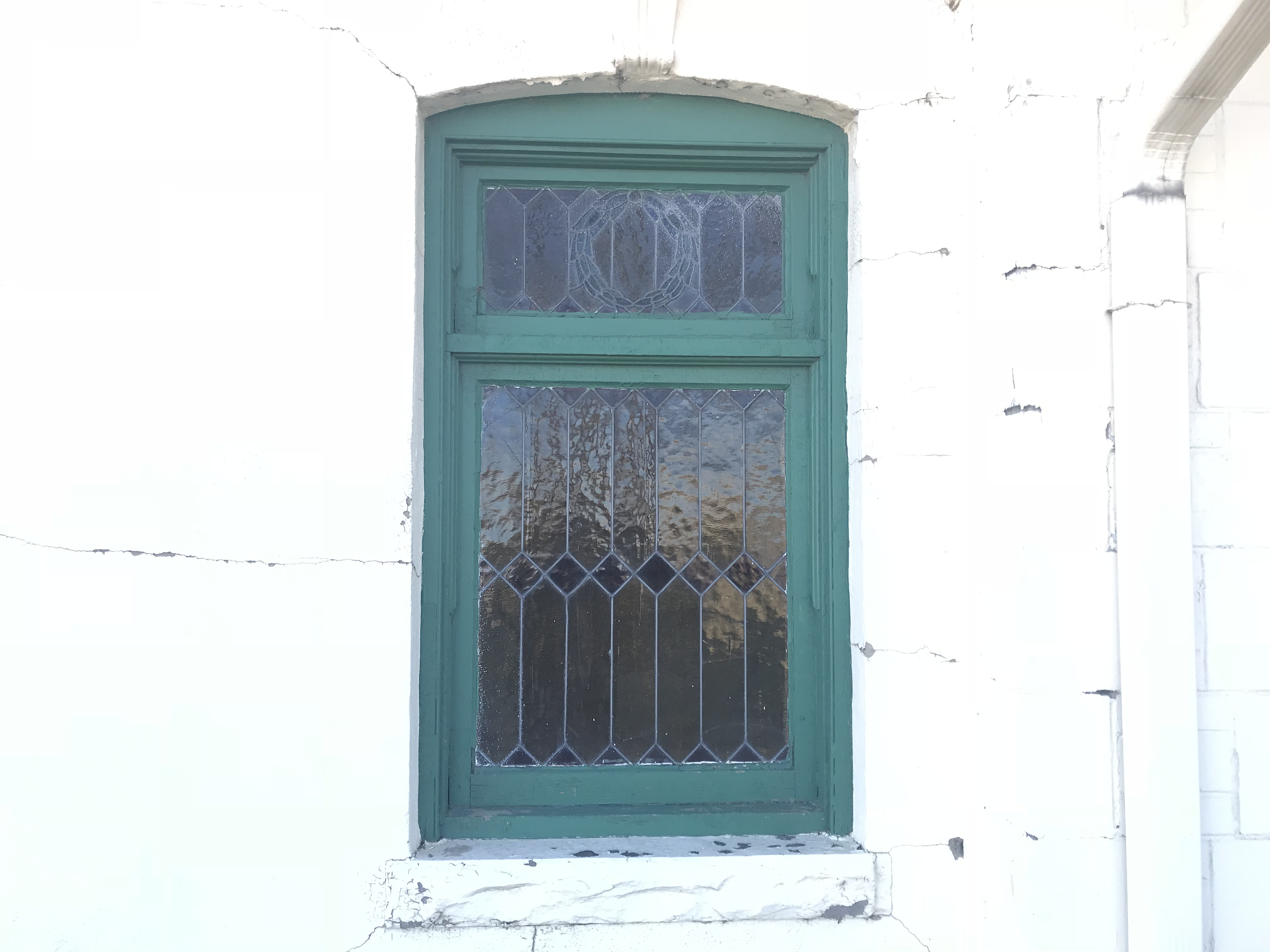
Edbrooke, Frank E.; Lowrie, Harvey C. 3

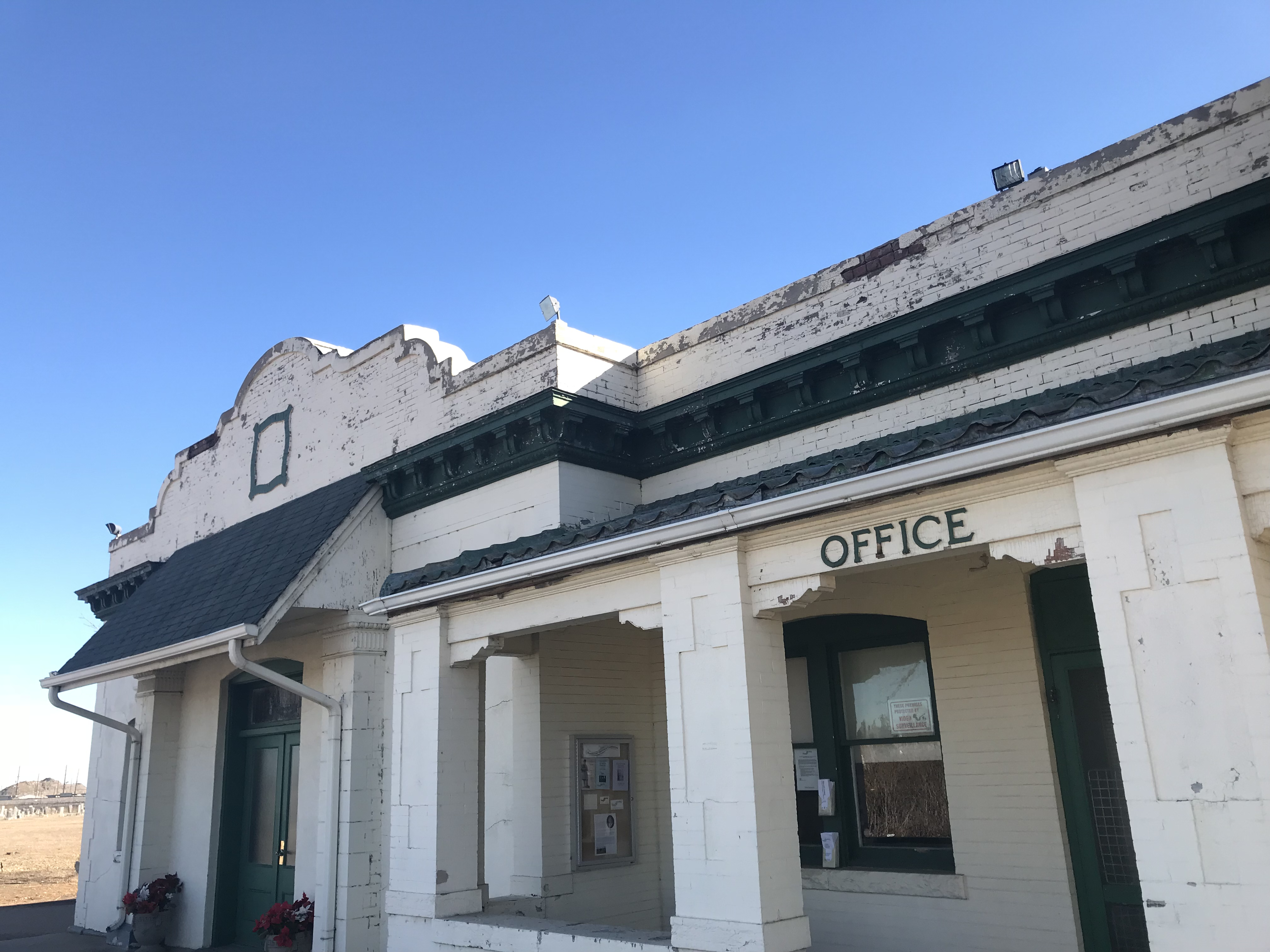
Edbrooke, Frank E.; Lowrie, Harvey C. 4

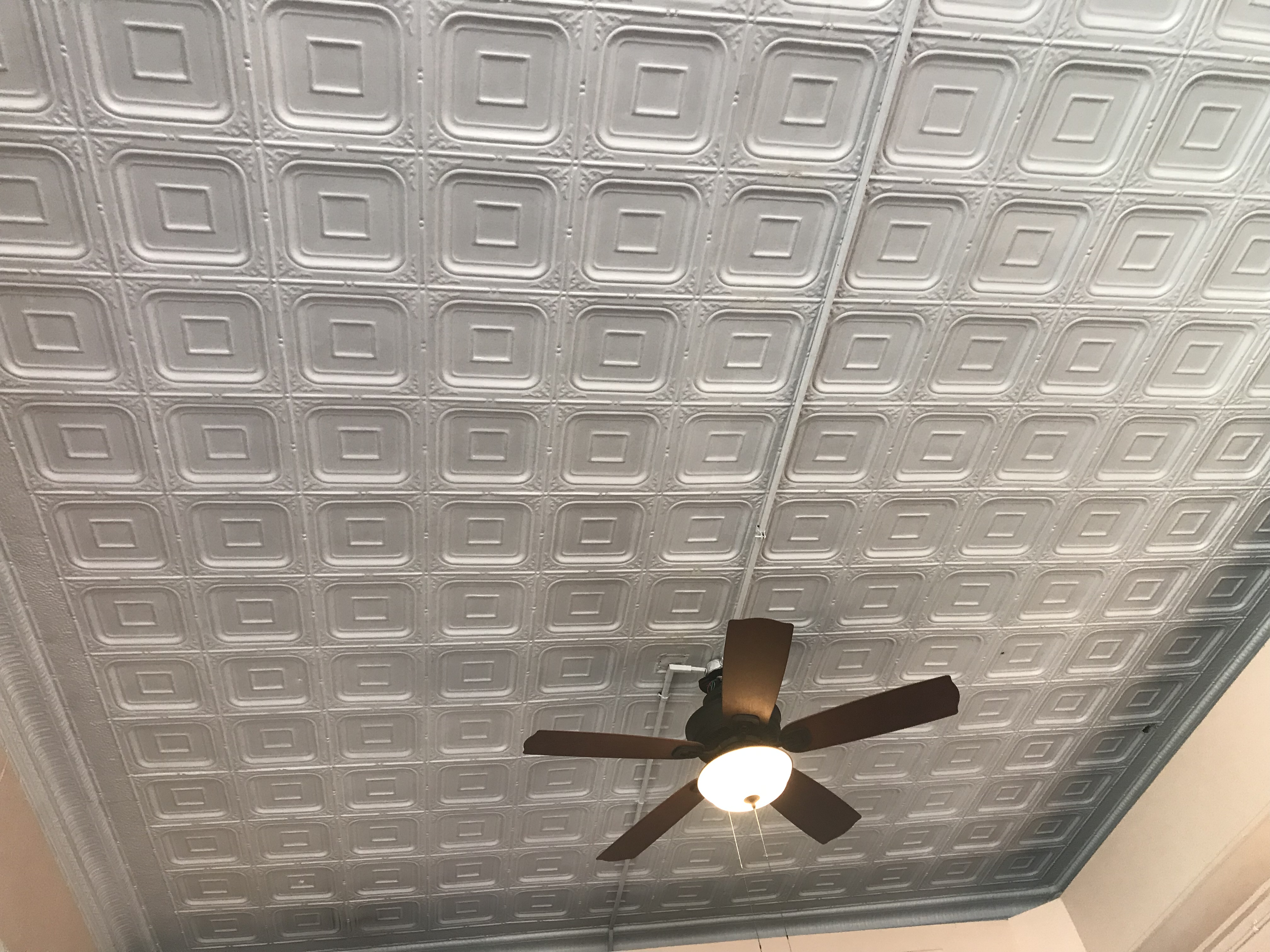
Edbrooke, Frank E.; Lowrie, Harvey C. 5

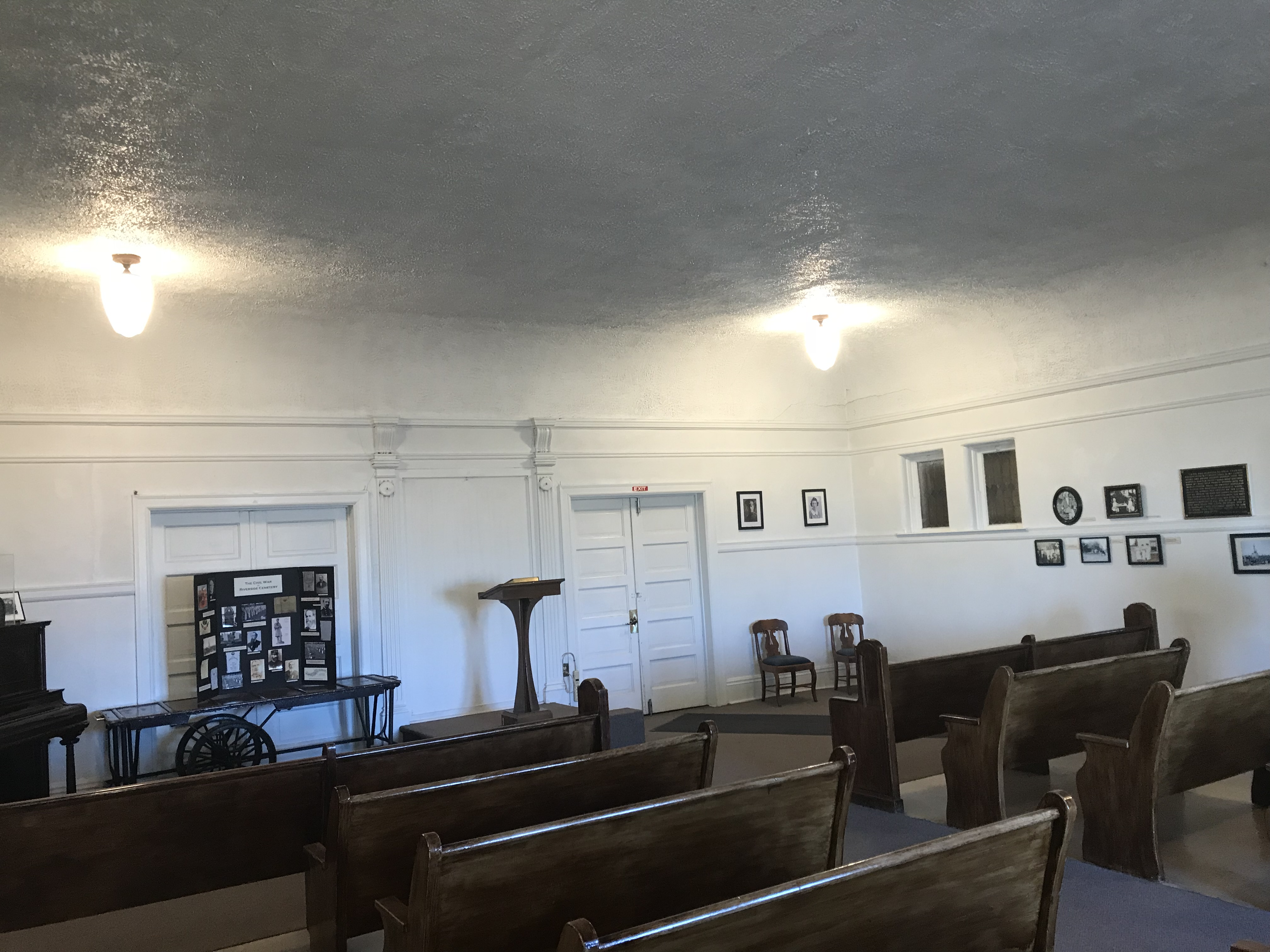
Edbrooke, Frank E.; Lowrie, Harvey C. 10

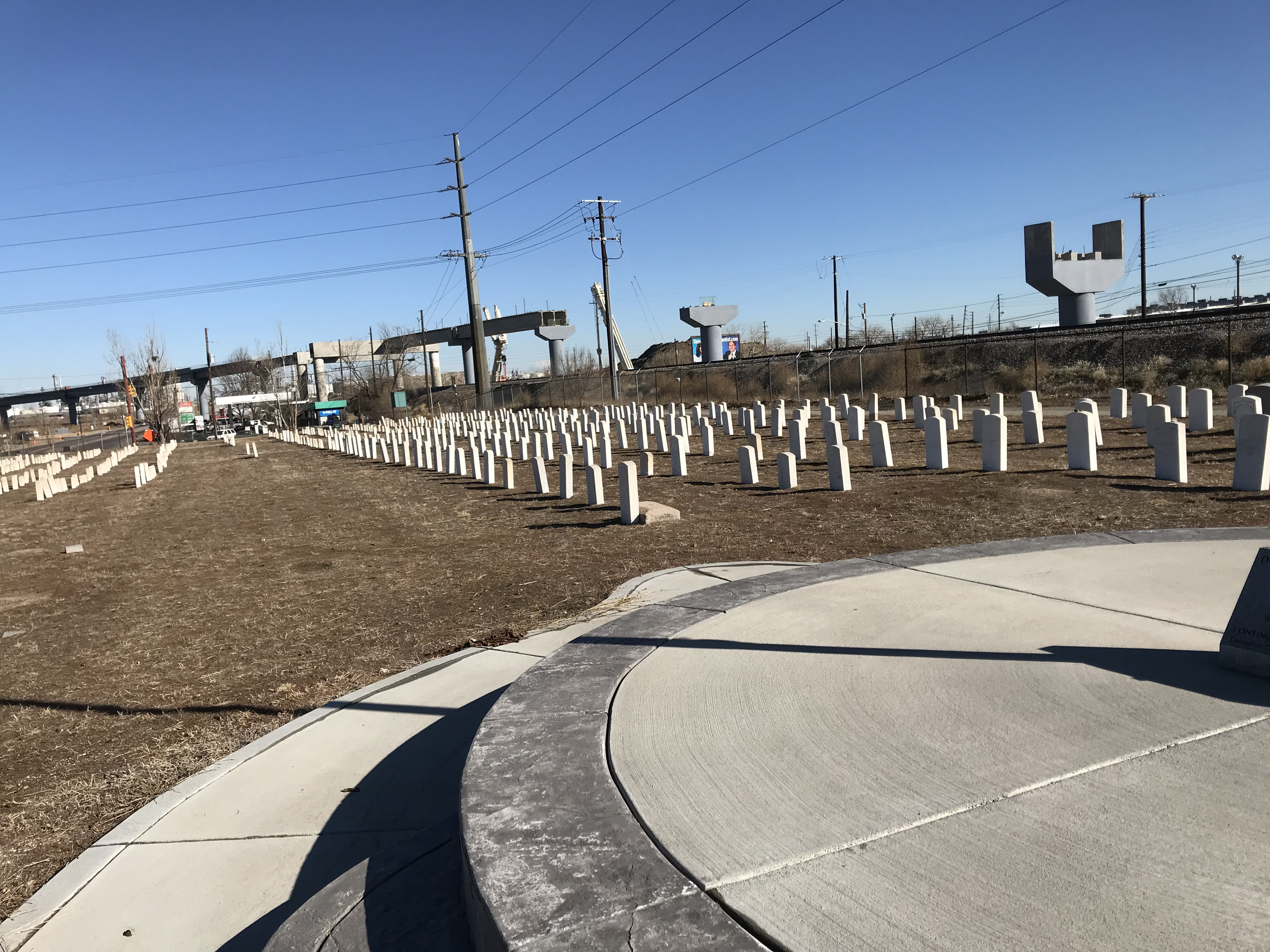
Civil war memorials

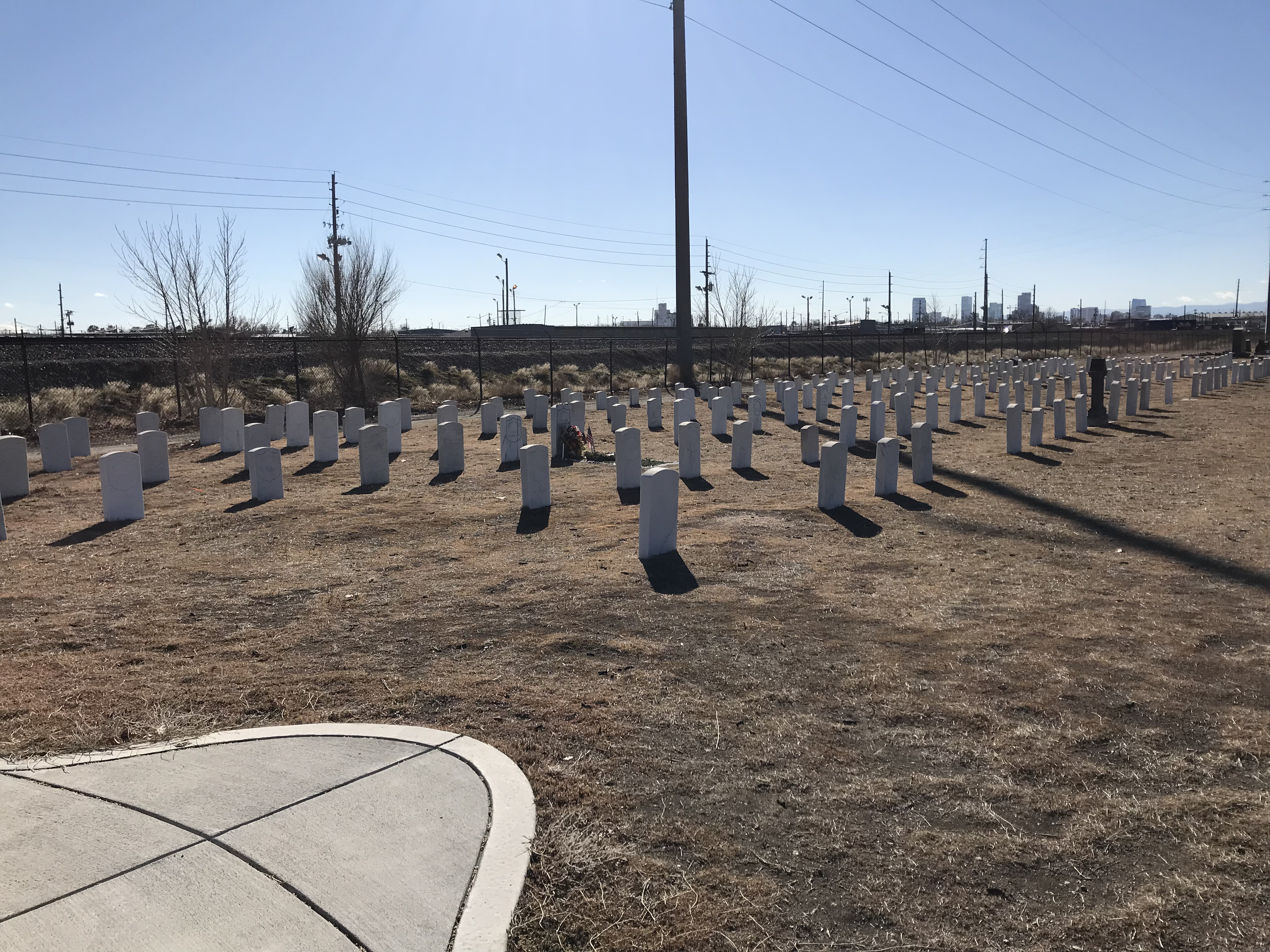
Civil war memorials 2 Riverside; the gravestone of Brevet Major Silas Soule is the marker decorated with flowers and an American flag in the middle of the photo

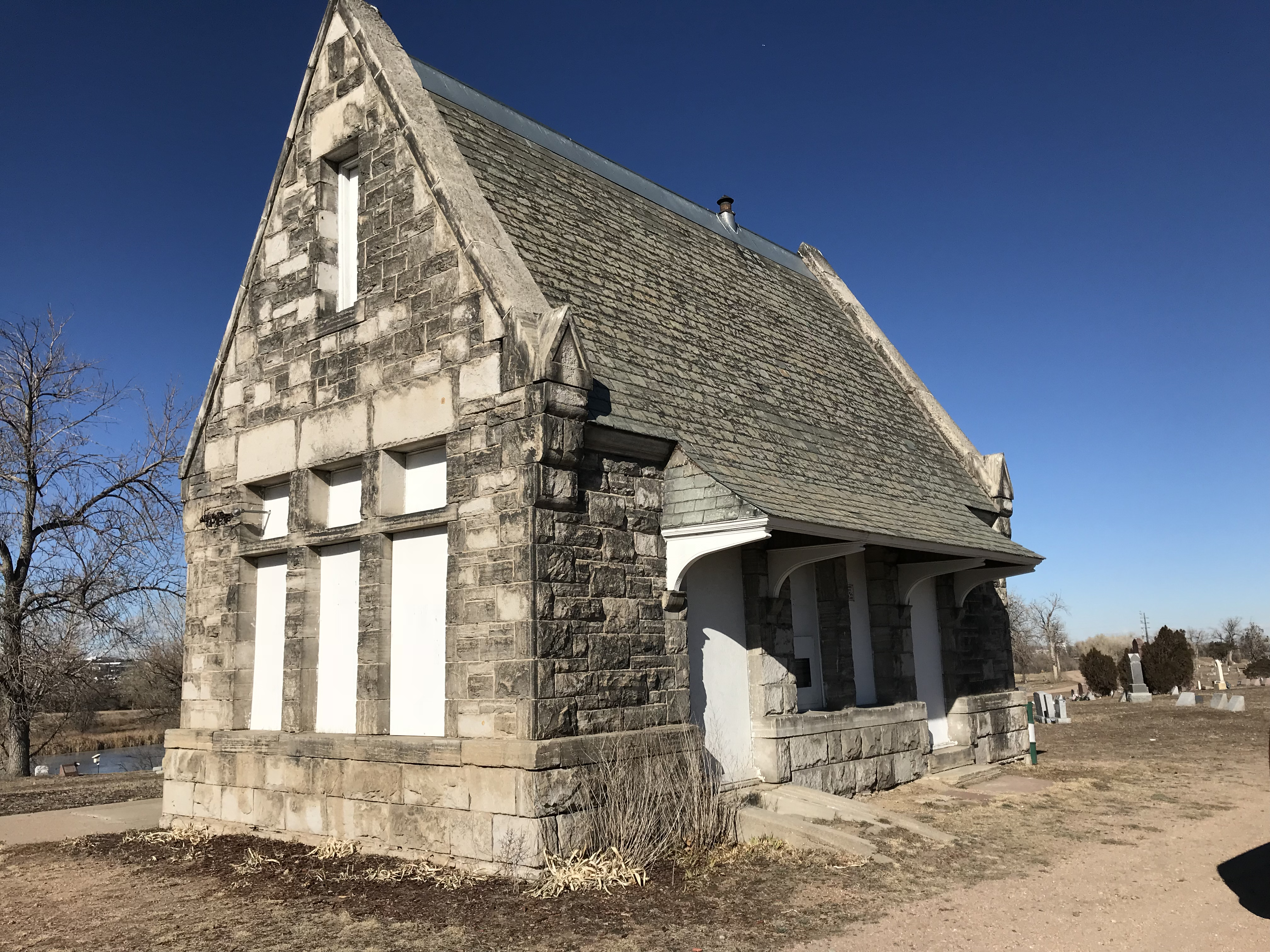
Stone house Riverside

== See also ==
- National Register of Historic Places listings in Adams County, Colorado
- Fairmount-cemetery.com
- Fairmount Heritage Foundation
