= Woman's Union Missionary Society of America for Heathen Lands =

American Christian mission organization

Woman's Union Missionary Society of America for Heathen Lands (also known as Woman's Union Missionary Society of New York) was an American Christian mission organization. Established in 1861, its headquarters were at 41 Bible House, Astor Place, New York City. The first meeting called to consider organizing a society was gathered in a private parlor in New York City on January 9, 1861, and addressed by a returned missionary from Burma. At a subsequent meeting on January 10, the organization was effected, with Sarah Platt Doremus as president. The society's object was to "send out and maintain single women as Bible-readers and teachers, and to raise up native female laborers in heathen lands".

The society's papers are held at the Billy Graham Center at Wheaton College.

== History ==
Baptist women were among the leaders in the Woman's Union Missionary Movement of 1860. In the spring of that year, Ellen Huntly Bullard Mason, wife of Dr. Francis Mason of Burma, took the long journey home expressly to present her plea in person to the American Baptist Missionary Union and the women of the churches. She held numerous conferences with the board of the Missionary Union and other boards, urging them to send out single women as teachers and Bible readers. But they were not yet ready to send "unprotected females" and the efforts in that direction were a failure. But the little group, fired with her enthusiasm, conceived the idea of a non-denominational society patterned after the English organization of 1834, enlisted missionary workers in New York, Brooklyn, and Philadelphia, and in 1861 incorporated the Woman's Union Missionary Society of America for Heathen Lands. Its platform was the employment of unmarried women to labor among the women of the Orient, all denominations being represented. Its motto was, "O woman, great is thy faith, be it unto thee even as thou wilt." In courtesy to Mrs. Mason, Taungoo was the field chosen for the first missionaries, and during the first year four native Bible women were employed in Burma, India and China.

The basis of the society was nondenominational, and ladies from six divisions of the church made up the initial membership. It proposed to send out only single women, and the converts to be gathered would unite with such churches as geography and fellowship made practicable. So, from the first, the society undertook to be a helper of many denominations, rather than to establish something in its own name.

The original plan was to secure a hundred collectors, who would each be responsible for US$20 for five consecutive years. In 12 months, 100 collectors had pledged, and the subscriptions received amounted to more than $2,000. The society immediately began to issue a publication, which at first was called " Missionary Crumbs," but with the eighth issue was changed to "Missionary Link". It was a monthly publication, priced at $0.50 per year.

One of the original auxiliaries of the "Union" had formed as an independent society in Boston in 1860. Other auxiliaries sprung up, totaling 26 in 1891, and 178 Bands, which were found in 15 different U.S. states and in New Brunswick. A unique feature of this society was its "Invalids' Auxiliary," to which 91 members were added in 1888, and whose contributions for that year were $100. Up to 1886, the total receipts of the society were about a $1,000.00. They stood for 1890 at $60,026.88.

The first missionary was sent out in November, 1861, Miss Marstou, to Burma. In July, 1863, Miss Brittan (Episcopalian) went to zenana work in Calcutta. At the end of four years, the society had two missionaries, seven Bible-women, and another serving in hospitals in Calcutta. In 1890, their force had become 63 missionaries, of whom four were physicians. All these women were located in Calcutta, Allahabad, and Kanpur, India; Shanghai, China; and Yokohama, Japan.

It became apparent that one society could not meet all the demands, and so in 1868 the Congregational women withdrew and organized by themselves, then the Presbyterian women in 1869 and 1870, and the Baptist women in 1871.

== India ==
Zenana missions was the strongest feature of this society's labors from the beginning. In Calcutta, it was known as "The American Doremus Zenana Mission". It included the superintendent (always one of the missionary women); 16 missionaries; 55 native teachers; zenana pupils, 1,000; schools, 50; suburban schools, in Kanpur, 12; and Entally, two. In Calcutta, there was also an orphanage, with superintendent, zenana teacher, Bible-class teacher, and 112 pupils. The mission had no school-houses in Calcutta, but its 50 schools were taught in rooms which were rented in the houses of Babus. There were 1,500 children in these schools, whose lessons were received behind the purdah. Christian literature for circulation was provided in the zenanas.

The children of the orphanage, all girls, divided their time between study, work, and play. Their ages ranged from 2–18 years. The youngest did not attend school. Those above them were taught and trained for teaching in their vernacular - either Bengali or Hindustani - with a little English besides. The older girls constituted a higher department, and their work was done wholly in English, with one language of the country also. The most advanced of all were put into a normal training-class and study for the entrance examinations of the University of Calcutta. Several of these upper-class girls were suitable candidates for a medical course, and the superintendent hoped to see them trained as physicians. All these girls were also trained in the Bible.

At Allahabad, there was a Superintendent, zenana missionary, 16 missionaries, six native assistants, 1,398 pupils, 1,000 in 47 schools, 398 pupils in 320 zenanas.

At Cownpore (Kanpur), there was a superintendent, zenana missionary, 13 missionaries, five native assistants, 968 pupils, 623 in 37 schools, 345 pupils in 184 zenanas. Among the schools is one for high-caste Hindus taught by a Pundita. It contained 38 girls, in 1889, who were learning Bible verses, catechism, and Scripture lessons.

According to records, around 1950 to 1955, the Woman's Union Missionary Society of America returned from India and left behind all of their assets, including Land buildings such as hospitals and schools, to the Woman's Union Missionary Society that was registered in India under the Indian Society Registration Act of 1860. Since that time, the organization, which is now known as the United Fellowship for Christian Service, has continued to run charitable operations in India.

The Woman's Union Missionary Society of New York (WUMS) made significant historical contributions to India by initiating missions in Calcutta as a zenana mission. WUMS was founded to provide a way for single women to be sent to Asia to address the physical, educational, and spiritual needs of the women there. They were the first American organization to send single women to the mission field. Mrs. Doremus acted as President of the Society until her death in 1877. Her daughter, Miss Sarah D. Doremus, was also active in the organization and served as Corresponding Secretary. Miss Harriette Britain began WUMS work in India in 1863, starting a day school for girls in Calcutta, and later an orphanage and a high school. In 1868, a zenana ministry was begun in Allahabad, and Central Girls School was founded there. (A "zenana" was the name for the women's section in Indian homes, both Moslem and Hindu. WUMS missionaries and native Bible women would visit zenanas on a regular basis, reading Scripture to the women and children who lived there, and sometimes leading Bible studies.)

Two medical missionaries, Dr. Sara Seward and Dr. Mary Seelye, established a children's hospital in Calcutta in 1871. Work began in Kanpur in 1880 with day schools and more zenana work, and later a boarding school and an orphanage. Two hospitals were opened after the turn of the century, the Mary Ackerman Hoyt Memorial Hospital in Jhansi in 1900, and the Lily Lytle Broadwell Memorial Hospital in Fatehpur in 1905. A women's home was also established in Fatehpur, and the Ann Murray Dispensary began in Jahanabad in 1917. Following World War II, WUMS began work with Tibetan refugees in Rajpur, and in 1948 Kalvari Bible School was begun.

Collaborating with locals who saw the light of Jesus, WUMS representatives began missionary work that quickly expanded as more individuals joined the cause, accepting Jesus Christ as their Lord and Savior. Through their joint efforts, numerous schools and hospitals were established in cities such as Calcutta, Kanpur, Fatehpur, Allahabad, and Jhansi through the hard work and donations received by the mission to spread the message of the Lord to the heathen lands. These new believers in the message of Jesus Christ went on to establish several orphanages, schools and hospitals, including:

- In Calcutta, an orphanage, four city day schools for Hindu girls, and a village school at Sonarpur (1863)
- In Allahabad, zenana work in Hindu and Mohammedan homes, Central Girls’ School, and outstation work at Darraganj (1863)
- In Cawnpore, zenana work in Hindu and Mohammedan homes, Mary A. Merriman School, Orphanage, and eight city day schools (1879)
- In Jhansi, the Ackerman-Hoyt hospitals for women and children, nurses’ training school, medical work in the city and native states, zenana work in Hindu and Mohammedan homes, and one day school (1898)
- In Fatehpur, the Lily Lytle Broadwell hospital for women and children, nurse training, Owen Memorial Dispensary, Dispensary at Jahanabad Fatehpur District, and the Women’s Home (1906)

Following World War II, WUMS representatives returned to the United States, having successfully established the mission alongside their locals. Upon their return, WUMS representatives left the locals with the mission, who through their hard work, built schools and hospitals for their community. These efforts led to the creation of assets, including land, hospitals, and schools, which would continue to uphold the values and ideas of Christianity, so that the kingdom of God would come on earth as it is in heaven, which were introduced by the WUMS representatives from New York to the heathens of India that turned believers.

These assets, along with the missionary work of spreading the message of Jesus Christ to the non-believers, were then taken up by the locals who had turned believers in Jesus Christ, to continue the mission's work. Recognizing the need for formal organization, the mission was officially registered in India for the first time in 1954-55 under the Indian Society Registration Act of 1860.

Since its registration, the organization has been known as the United Fellowship for Christian Service (UFCS), previously recognized as the Woman's Union Missionary Society in India. UFCS has continued to operate and expand its charitable missions across India, preserving the legacy of service and support to communities in need.

== China ==
In Shanghai, there was a medical missionary, medical assistant, missionary teacher, five Chinese teachers, and five hospital helpers.

The Margaret Williamson Hospital was a stone building. Patients came 15 miles (24 km) by boat or wheelbarrow to the dispensary, or walked there from 5–10 miles (8.0–16.1 km) on their bound feet. It was open every day except Sundays. Every new patient was registered; and sufficient medicine was given for five or more days. The doctor saw on average 160 in a day, although once, there were 196; and her assistant, the nurse, put up 250 prescriptions in one day. All patients in the hospital were expected, if possible, to pay for their rice. Many could not afford even this. Private patients were also accepted. Work began at 8 A.m. with prayer, and a Bible-class met on Friday evening. The Bridgman Memorial Home contained 40 or more girls ages 5–16 years.

Public examinations of the school opened with prayer and a hymn. The girls were not taught English. All were from poor homes, and were trained in sewing, mending, darning, and knitting. They were also taught to wash and iron, and to take turns in the kitchen where they learned cooking. There were several day-schools in the city, numbering 70 or more scholars, who joined the girls from the Home in Sunday-school, and with women also, brought the attendance up to 150-180. The children were drilled in behavior and the Scriptures.

== Japan ==
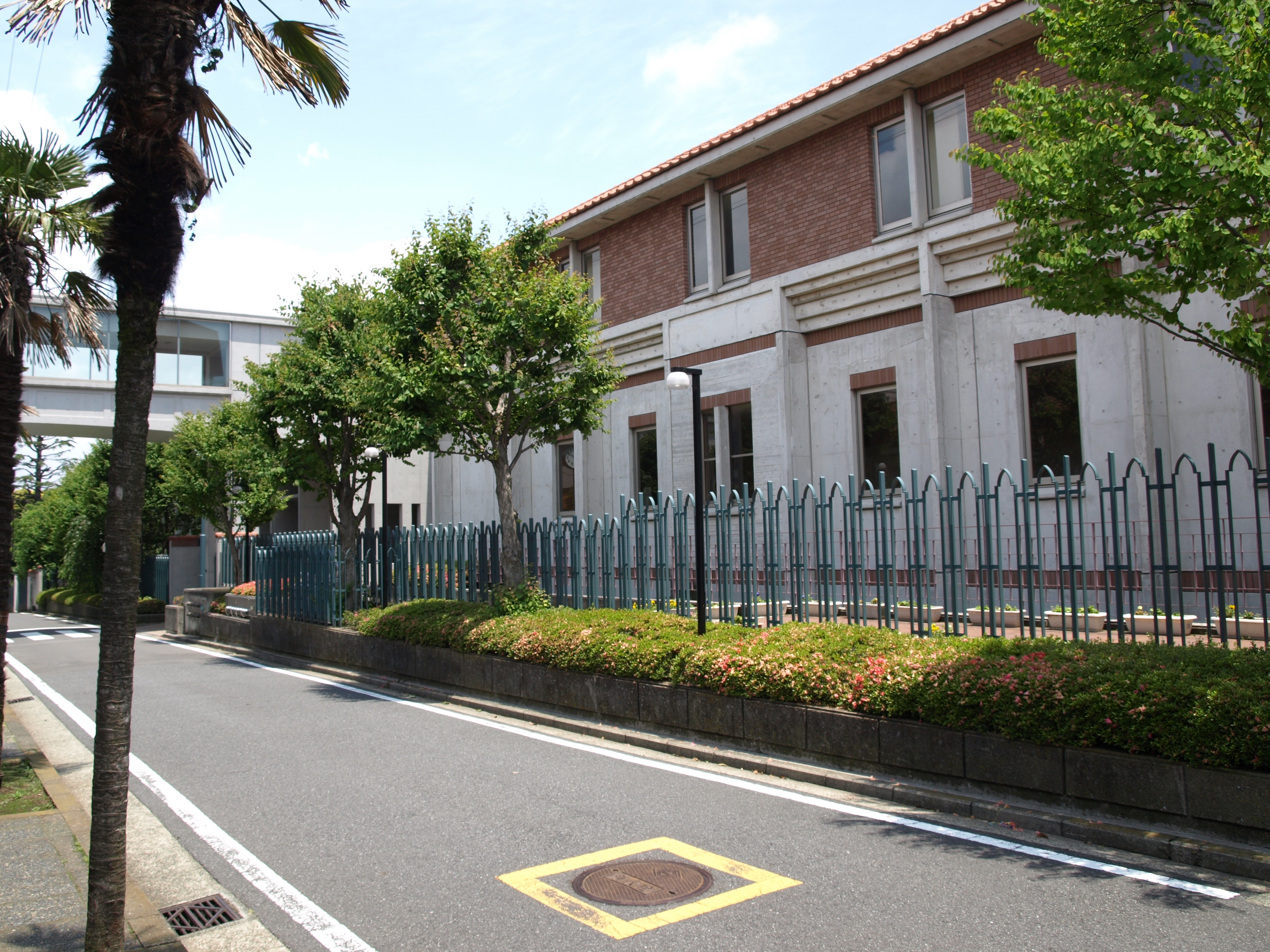
Doremus School

In Yokohama, the staff included the superintendent, missionary teacher and evangelist, superintendent of Children's Home, two missionary teachers, physician, six Japanese teachers, six Japanese medical assistants. 21 Bible-women, 140 scholars, 200 in Sunday-school. Seven girls were graduated from the school in the English course in June, 1888. In all, 35 girls had passed the English department up to 1889, some of whom were teaching in mission schools, and others were married to evangelists and pastors. There was a corps of 21 Bible-women, three of them self-supporting. None of them understood English. Currently there is a private girls' secondary education school taking in women aged 12 to 18 called Yokohama Kyoritsu Gakuen in Yokohama, Japan. Yokohama Kyoritsu's English name is Doremus School, as it was established by Mary P Brine, Louise H Pearson (the school's first headmistress), and Julia N Crosby (school's second headmistress), three women associated with The Women's Union Missionary Society of American for Heathen Lands.

== Other works ==
The society published several books, including The story and work of the Woman's Union Missionary Society of America for Heathen Lands (1883).

The society inspired other Christian women, including the Women’s Foreign Missionary Society of the Methodist Protestant Church, which was established after members attended a speech given by Miss L Guthrie, a WUMSHL missionary working in Japan.

== Notable people ==
- Martha Violet Ball
- Catherine Bonney
- Sarah Platt Doremus
- Lizzie M. Guthrie
- Ellen Huntly Bullard Mason
- Mina MacKenzie

== See also ==
- Women's missionary societies
