= Younghusband =

Younghusband may refer to:

- Younghusband (band), an English alternative rock band, formed in 2007

== People ==
- Andrew Younghusband (born 1970), Canadian television personality, writer and journalist
- Arthur Younghusband (1854–1931), English civil servant in India, cousin of George Younghusband and Francis Younghusband
- Charles Younghusband (1821–1899), superintendent of the Royal Gun Factory
- Eileen Younghusband (1902–1981), British social worker
- Eileen Younghusband (WAAF officer) (1921–2016), British filter officer in the Women's Auxiliary Air Force during World War II
- Colonel Sir Francis Younghusband (1863–1942), British Army officer, explorer, and spiritualist
  - The 1903–04 Younghusband Expedition to Tibet, which he commanded
- Major General Sir George Younghusband (1859–1944), British Army officer, Keeper of the Jewel House, and author
- James Younghusband (born 1986), English-Filipino football player
- Phil Younghusband (born 1987), English-Filipino football player
- William Younghusband (1819–1863) South Australian pastoralist and politician

== Places ==
=== Australia ===
- Hundred of Younghusband, a cadastral unit in South Australia
- Younghusband, South Australia, a small settlement on the Murray River
- Younghusband Peninsula, a peninsula in South Australia

=== Canada ===
- Younghusband Ridge, on the border of Alberta and British Columbia, Canada

== See also ==
- Young Husbands, a 1958 Italian comedy film
