= Liston =

Liston may refer to:

== People ==
=== Given name ===
- Liston Barfield (born 1945), American politician in South Carolina
- Liston Bochette (born 1957), Puerto Rican athlete
- Liston Colaco (born 1998), Indian footballer
- Liston Fonataba (born 1984), Indonesian footballer
- Liston Garthwaite (1833–1918), British educator, author and translator
- Liston Pope (1909—1974), American clergyman and educator
- Liston B. Ramsey (1919–2001), American politician in North Carolina
- Liston Sprauve (1944–2018), United States Virgin Islands weightlifter

=== Surname ===
- Liston (surname), includes a list of notable people with the surname

== Places ==
- Liston (Corfu), a pedestrian street and district in the city of Corfu in Greece
- Liston, Essex, a hamlet in England
- Liston, New South Wales, a village in Australia
- Liston Township, Woodbury County, Iowa, a township in the United States

== Other users ==
- Liston (square), a Venetian word for a part of a city, usually a square or section of a square
- Liston College, a New Zealand secondary school
- Liston House, a historic house in Delaware, United States
- Liston knife, a type of surgical instrument
- Liston Stadium, a sport stadium in Baldwin City, Kansas, United States

== See also ==
- J. J. Liston Trophy, an award in Australian rules football
- Kirkliston, a village in Scotland
