= Cultural heritage of Nanjing =

Overview of the cultural heritage

Nanjing is a political and cultural city with more than 2,500 years of history as a city and nearly 500 years of history as a capital. Many dynasties or regimes in history have been established here, so it is called the "Ancient Capital of Six Dynasties". Because of its historical origins, Nanjing has many cultural heritages.

== World Heritage ==
=== cultural heritage ===
==== Imperial Tombs of the Ming and Qing Dynasties ====
It is the largest imperial mausoleum in Nanjing and one of the largest imperial mausoleums in ancient China. On July 3, 2003, the 27th session of the UNESCO World Heritage Committee was selected as a world cultural heritage .

==== Nanjing City Walls of the Ming and Qing Dynasties ====
The City Wall of Nanjing refers to the wall of the ancient capital city of Nanjing built in the early Ming Dynasty. Located by the southern bank of the lower Yangtze River, it is built to protect the only capital of ancient China that had ever been built to the south of the Yangtze River. It has been listed in UNESCO World Cultural Heritage Tentative Lists.

=== Intangible cultural heritage ===
==== Nanjing cloud brocade weaving(Yunjin) ====
Cloud Brocade is a traditional Chinese jacquard silk brocade, which is a specialty of Nanjing. It is named for its patterns and decorations like clouds in the sky. On September 30, 2009, cloud brocade weaving technique was selected into the UNESCO "Representative List of Intangible Cultural Heritage of Humanity".
