= Arthur Younghusband =

British civil servant of the Raj

Arthur Delaval Younghusband

Commissioner in Sind
- In office 1905–1912

Personal details
- Born: 30 November 1854
- Died: 30 August 1931 (aged 76)
- Spouse(s): Maud Helen, daughter of Lewis Gordon
- Education: Sherborne, Rugby, Clifton and Balliol College, Oxford
- Occupation: civil servant of the Raj
- Known for: Commissioner in Sind from 1905 to 1912
- Awards: CSI (1907), CBE (1920)

Arthur Delaval Younghusband CSI CBE (30 November 1854 – 30 August 1931) was a British civil servant of the Raj.

== Early life ==
The second (but eldest surviving) son of Lieutenant-General Robert Romer Younghusband, CB, who served at Sind (sometime as Adjutant-General), as well as at Baluchistan and Hyderabad, by his wife Ellen Blayds, daughter of W. S. Benthall, of Totnes, Younghusband was educated at Sherborne, Rugby, Clifton and Balliol College, Oxford, before entering the Indian Civil Service in 1875. He attained the rank of deputy commissioner in 1892 and commissioner in 1897, being awarded the Kaisar-i-Hind Medal (1st Class) in 1901, and serving as an additional member of the Government of Bombay's Council in 1903.

== Sind ==
He was the Commissioner in Sind from 1905 to 1912.

== Later life ==
Having been awarded CSI (1907) and CBE (1920) in recognition of his career, Younghusband died on 30 August 1931 at Priory House, Long Bennington, near Grantham, Lincolnshire, England, aged 76, without issue, but survived by his wife, Maud Helen, daughter of Lewis Gordon, whom he had married in 1892. He was succeeded as head of the family by his nephew, Ralph George Napier Younghusband, son of George William Younghusband.

Two of his brothers also had careers in India: George William Younghusband (1856-1897) served with the 34th Regiment, 2nd Punjab Cavalry, and Romer Edward Younghusband (1858-1933), CSI, a barrister, worked with the Indian Civil Service from 1879, as a Deputy Commissioner (1894), General Secretary to the Government of Punjab (1899-1900), Commissioner at Lahore, and Member of Council of the Lieutenant-Governor of Punjab (1905–09).

Younghusband's first cousins, sons of his father's younger brother Maj.-Gen. John William Younghusband, CSI, were the brothers Maj.-Gen. George Younghusband, Indian Army officer, author, and Keeper of the Jewel House at the Tower of London and Lt-Col Sir Francis Younghusband, Indian Army officer, administrator and explorer. Their uncle was Lt-Gen. Charles Younghusband, an Army officer and meteorologist.

Government offices
Preceded by John William Pitt Muir-Mackenzie	Commissioner in Sind; 1905–1912	Succeeded by William Henry Lucas
