= Kheroth Bose =

Kheroth Mohini Bose, ਖੇਰੋਥ ਮੋਹਿਨੀ ਬੋਸ (c. 1866 – July 1, 1935) was an Indian physician and Christian missionary who operated in the community of Asrapur, India. She was a member of the Church of England Zenana Missionary Society.

== Early life and education ==
Kheroth Bose came to the town of Asrapur as a child to attend a girls' school. Her sister, Mona Bose, also attended the school. At the age of 19, she was sent with her sister to England to study medical care. For 18 months, she learned how to care for female patients in India. Her training was mostly at the Hospital for Women and Children in England and the home of an English doctor, where she also stayed during her time there. She also received some training at Great Ormond Street Hospital.

== Service ==
After her return from England in 1889, Bose was put in charge of the medical mission in Asrapur. A short time later, the hospital at Asrapur was built, and Bose led the staff. For fifty years, she was a medical professional in the region. Bose was responsible for the medical care of around 1,000 people in Asrapur, who were both English and Indian. She was also a trained midwife. Bose spoke both Punjabi and English. As a devout Christian, she was heavily involved in the religious life of the town. She was a frequent contributor to a missionary newspaper called India's Women and China's Daughters, where she chronicled the religious events of the town and her care milestones. Bose wrote a book titled The village of hope, or, The history of Asrapur.

Bose was one of the founders of the Lady Irwin Tuberculosis Sanatorium.

== Death and legacy ==
Bose sent in her letter of resignation in October 1934 and retired on January 1, 1935. She remained close to the mission and visited frequently. She was sent to London for surgery due to the illness, undisclosed in official documents, that eventually killed her. She died on July 1, 1935, at the age of 69, at the Foreman College house in Lahore, Pakistan.

=== Awards ===
- Kaisar-i-Hind Medal
