= Mona Chandravati Gupta =

Indian social worker, educationist (1896–1984)

- Born: 20 October 1896; Yangon, British Burma
- Died: 30 December 1984 (aged 88); India
- Education: Diocesan College, Kolkata
- Occupations: Social worker, educationist
- Known for: Social service
- Awards: Padma Shri; Kaisar-i-Hind Medal

Mona Chandravati Gupta (1896–1984) was a British Burma born Indian social worker, educationist and the founder of Nari Sewa Samiti, a non governmental organization working for the social and economic upliftment of women.

== Biography ==
Gupta was born in Rangoon, present day Yangon and the capital city of Myanmar, on 20 October 1896 and after early education at Yangon and London, she secured her graduate degree from Diocesan College, Kolkata. Taking up a career in education, she worked as the vice principal of the Government Girls College, Lucknow and served as a member of the University Review Committee for women's education.

Gupta started two women's organizations in the 1930s, Zenana Park League in 1931 and Women's Social Service League in 1936. Almost a decade later, she founded the Women's Academy and after the Indian independence in 1947, the academy was merged with Women's Social Service League to form Nari Sewa Samiti. The organization has now grown to cover four educational institutions, two vocational centres for women, three women's welfare centres, a cultural centre and a medical facility.

Gupta was a former member of Uttar Pradesh Legislative Council and served the courts of Allahabad University and Lucknow University in 1939 and 1940 respectively. A winner of the Kaisar-i-Hind Medal from the British Indian administration in 1939, she was honoured by the Government of India in 1965, with the award of Padma Shri, the fourth highest Indian civilian award for her contributions to the society.

== See also ==
- Allahabad University
- Lucknow University
