= Silverine Swer =

Indian social and environmental activist

- Born: 12 November 1910; Shillong, Eastern Bengal and Assam, India
- Died: 1 February 2014 (aged 103); Riatsamthiah, Shillong, Meghalaya, India
- Resting place: Mawkhar Presbyterian Church Cemetery; 25°34′47″N 91°52′38″E
- Other name: Kong Sil
- Occupations: Social activist Academic; Civil servant
- Awards: Padma Shri; Patogan Sangma Award; Silver Elephant Medal of the Bharat Scouts and Guides Award; Kaisar-i-Hind Medal; RG Buruah Smriti Rakhya Samiti

Silverine Swer (1910–2014), popularly known as Kong Sil (Kong means Elder sister in Khasi language), was an Indian social and environmental activist, educationist and civil servant. She was the first person of tribal origin to hold senior posts with the Government of Meghalaya, and was a recipient of the Silver Elephant Medal of the Bharat Scouts and Guides Award and Kaisar-i-Hind Medal. The Government of India awarded her the fourth highest civilian award of Padma Shri in 1990, making her the first recipient of the award from the state of Meghalaya.

== Biography ==
Silverine Swer was born on 12 November 1910 in a Khasi Christian family in Shillong, the capital of the Northeast Indian state of Meghalaya. After passing her matriculation from the Welsh Mission Girls School, Shillong, she graduated (BA) from Scottish Church College, under the University of Calcutta, in 1932, and continued there to secure her graduate degree in education (BT) in 1936. Her career started in 1937 at her alma mater, Welsh Mission Girls’ High School, and a year later, she was appointed as the Advisor/Trainer of the Girl Guides Movement, in 1938, in charge of the various schools located in the British Indian regions of Assam, Mizoram and East Pakistan (present day Bangladesh).

In 1944, Swer was selected as the Assistant Controller of Rationing under the British Indian government. She held the post until 1949 when she resigned from government service to take up the job of a teacher at Pine Mount School, Shillong. She stayed at the school for three years until she had a chance meeting with N. K. Rustomji, then Adviser to the Governor of Assam on NEFA, who persuaded her to take up the post of the Chief Social Education Officer of the North East Frontier Agency (NEFA) with office at Pasighat. She stayed with NEFA from 1952 to 1968 and returned to Shillong that year for a two-year stint at her native place where she was involved with the activities of the Good Will Movement of the Moral Re-Armament (MRA). She was among the Indian delegates who visited Sweden in 1970 in connection with MRA activities. Towards the latter part of her career, she chaired the International Year for Women and the Social Advisory Board of Meghalaya state, headed the State Guides movement as its commissioner and was a member of the Executive council of the North Eastern Hill University.

Silverine Swer, who remained a spinster throughout her life, died on 1 February 2014, aged 103, at her residence in Riatsamthiah in Shillong. Her mortal remains were buried at Mawkhar Presbyterian Church Cemetery in the high range city.

== Awards and recognitions ==
Her services as the Assistant Controller of Rationing in the 1940s earned her the award of Kaiser-i-Hind Medal from the British Government. She received the Silver Elephant Medal of the Bharat Scouts and Guides in 1976. She was also a recipient of the Patogan Sangma Award for social service and RG Buruah Smriti Rakhya Samiti Award. The Government of India awarded her the civilian honour of the Padma Shri in 1990. In 2010, when she turned a centenarian, the Governor of Meghalaya hosted a special party at Raj Bhavan, his official residence.

== See also ==
- Khasi people
- Moral Re-Armament
