= Diana Hartley =

English nursing administrator in India (1894 – 1986)

Diana Hartley (1894 – 1986) was an English nurse and nursing administrator in India. She served as the first General Secretary of the Trained Nurses Association of India, and worked to improve the standing of the nursing profession there.

== Early life and training ==
She was born on 23 November 1894. After the deaths of her parents during World War I, she spent two years in the United States living with relatives.

She trained as a nurse at the Royal Naval and Marine Maternity Nursing Home in Kent in 1926 and the Royal West Sussex Hospital in 1928. Her first pamphlet, "The Key to Mothercraft", was published in 1934 while she was working in private and district nursing.

== Trained Nurses Association of India ==
In 1935, she became the first General and Organising Secretary of the Trained Nurses Association of India. Her work involved overseeing the Student Nurses' Association, the Midwives' Association and the Health Visitors’ League. She visited hospitals across the whole Indian subcontinent, often drawing attention to the poor living and working conditions of nurses. During her tenure, membership of the TNAI increased from 800 to 2600. The Indian government, facing a nursing shortage, regularly consulted the TNAI for advice in the 1940s.

Hartley's work was intended to promote nursing education and to raise the status of the nursing profession in India. She wrote of the low esteem the profession was held in and the need to 'raise [its] prestige,' saying that this was more difficult in India than elsewhere.

She edited the Indian Nursing Journal from 1935 to 1944, where she continued to publish articles.

On being invalided in 1944, Hartley was awarded the Silver Kaiser-i-Hind Medal for her service in advancement of the public interest.

== Later life ==
Back in England, she became General Secretary of the National Association of State Enrolled Nurses, where she drew up the constitution as well as touring to give talks at meetings.

She died on 15 July 1986.
