= Edward Molyneux =

British fashion designer in Paris (1891–1974)

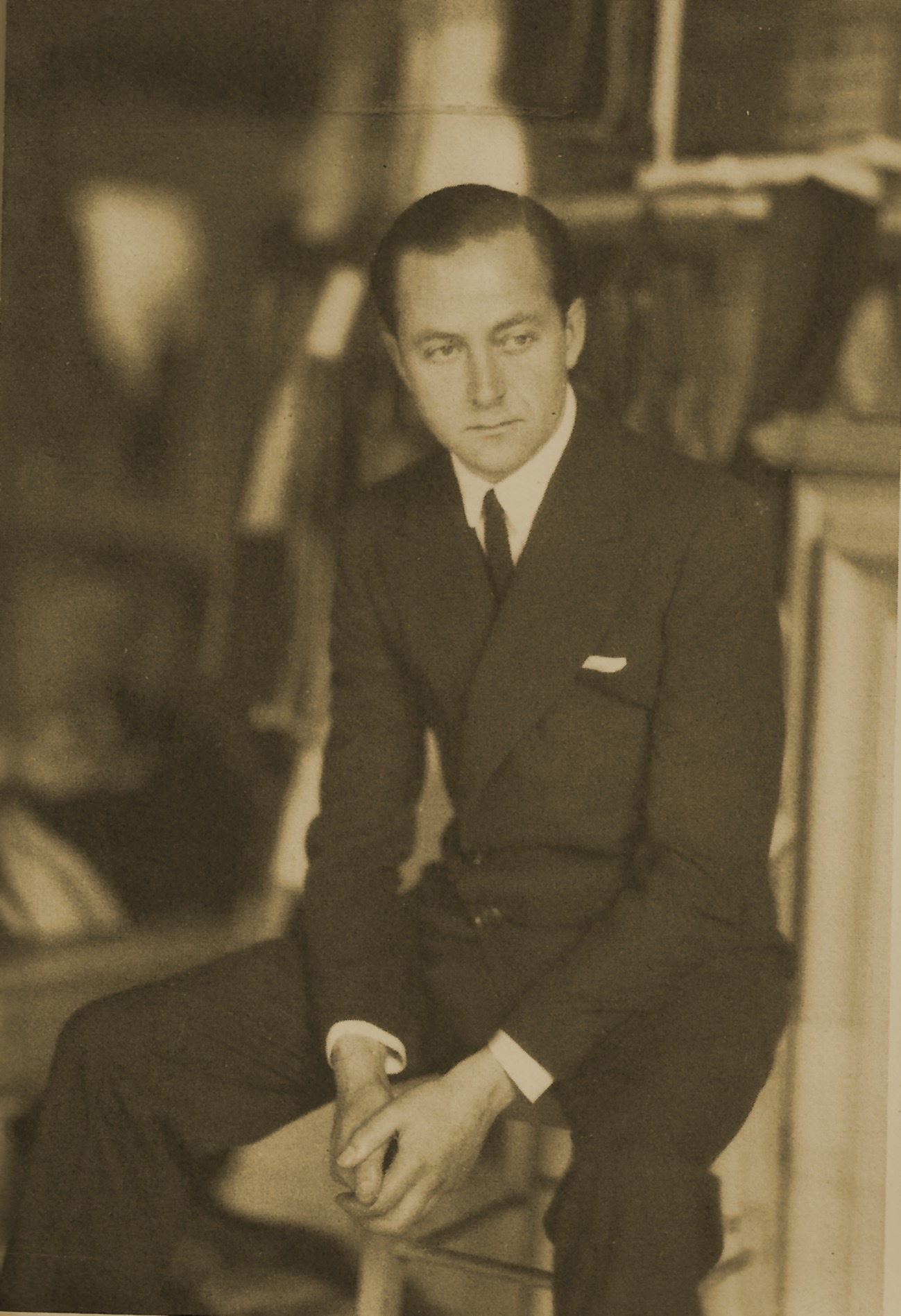
- Captain Edward Molyneux (1891–1974), photographed by James Abbe, Paris, 1922
- Born: Edward Henry Molyneux; 5 September 1891; London, England
- Died: 23 March 1974 (aged 82); Monaco
- Label: Molyneux

Edward Henry Molyneux (/ˈmɒlɪnʌks/ MOL-ih-nucks; 5 September 1891 – 23 March 1974) was a leading British fashion designer whose salon in Paris was in operation from 1919 until 1950. He was characterised as a modernist designer who played with the refinements of couture style, a modernist aesthetic, and the desire to be socially and culturally advanced.

== Early life ==
Edward Molyneux was born on 5 September 1891 in Hampstead, London, to Justin Molyneux and Lizzy Kenny. He was of Irish and French Huguenot ancestry. His uncle was Major Edward Mary Joseph Molyneux, who became known for his paintings of the Kashmir region. Edward was educated at Beaumont College, a Roman Catholic public school. Owing to the death of his father, he left school at the age of 16 to support himself and his mother while pursuing his ambitions as a painter and illustrator.

== Career ==
Molyneux found employment as a sketch artist for the London edition of the American magazine The Smart Set, where his drawings of fashionable women attracted the attention of the celebrated couturier Lucile (in private life Lady Duff Gordon). She hired him as a sketcher in her London salon in 1910 and by the end of the following year had promoted him to assistant designer at her Paris branch. He also worked for Lucile in New York.

On the outbreak of the First World War, he joined the British Army's Duke of Wellington's Regiment with which he fought in the Battle of Arras. He attained the rank of captain but lost his sight in one eye. For a time, he worked in the Admiralty's signals intelligence unit, Room 40. He returned to work for Lucile after being invalided out of the war but a disagreement with her resulted in the termination of his contract in 1919.

Molyneux opened his own fashion house in Paris at 14 rue Royale in November 1919 (later, 5 rue Royale), expanding to Monte Carlo in 1925, Cannes in 1927, and London in 1932. The designer quickly became known for an impeccably refined simplicity. Molyneux was, as historian Caroline Milbank wrote, "the designer to whom a fashionable woman would turn if she wanted to be absolutely right without being utterly predictable in the Twenties and Thirties". Frowning on superfluous decoration, he regularly dressed European royals, including Princess Marina, Duchess of Kent. He was also a favourite with trendsetting actresses including Greta Garbo, Marlene Dietrich, Gertrude Lawrence, Margaret Leighton, and Vivien Leigh. Protegés included future couturiers Christian Dior and Pierre Balmain, and he was friends with playwright Noël Coward.

During the Second World War, he moved his firm to London for the duration of the conflict and returned to Paris in 1946. Retiring in 1950, Molyneux left his fashion house in the hands of Jacques Griffe. He resumed designing in 1964, opening Studio Molyneux, a high quality ready-to-wear line that received mixed reviews. During this period Time magazine described him as "the Parisian equivalent of Manhattan's Mainbocher, a classicist devoted to the soft look and tailored line". He retired for a second time in 1969.

== Art ==
Molyneux painted throughout his life, and exhibitions of his paintings were held at the Galerie Weill in Paris (between 1950 and 1956) and at the Hammer Galleries in New York (1967). Here, "Carnations in Vase" was purchased by the Duke and Duchess of Windsor, and "Roses in Glass" by Greta Garbo.

Molyneux also amassed an extensive Impressionist art collection, including paintings by Picasso, Monet, Manet and 17 by Renoir. In 1955 they were sold as a lot to Ailsa Mellon Bruce, who in 1969 bequeathed the collection to the National Gallery of Art, Washington, D.C.

== Personal life ==
Molyneux had a complicated personal life. One of his early relationships was with Foreign Office diplomat Harold Nicolson, who helped finance the opening of the designer's first Paris salon. Although married to writer Vita Sackville-West, Nicolson was open with her about his affairs, including his fling with Molyneux. In 1923 Molyneux married (Jessie) Muriel Dunsmuir (1890–1951), one of eight daughters of the James Dunsmuir, Premier of British Columbia. They divorced in 1924.

== Death ==
Molyneux died on 23 March 1974 in Monte Carlo.

== Legacy ==
Following Molyneux's retirement in 1969, Studio Molyneux continued under the direction of his cousin John Tullis until it closed in 1977.

The Molyneux trademark is owned by French company Parfums Berdoues, and though the fashion component of the firm remains dormant, the firm still produces scents, such as "Captain" (1975), "Quartz" (1978), "Le Chic", "Vivre", "I Love You" and "Quartz Pure Red" (2008).
