= Jacques Griffe =

French fashion designer and couturier (1909-1996)

Jacques Griffe (1909–1996) was a French couturier and fashion designer.

== Biography ==
Griffe was born in Carcassonne, France. He died in 1996.

== Fashion career ==
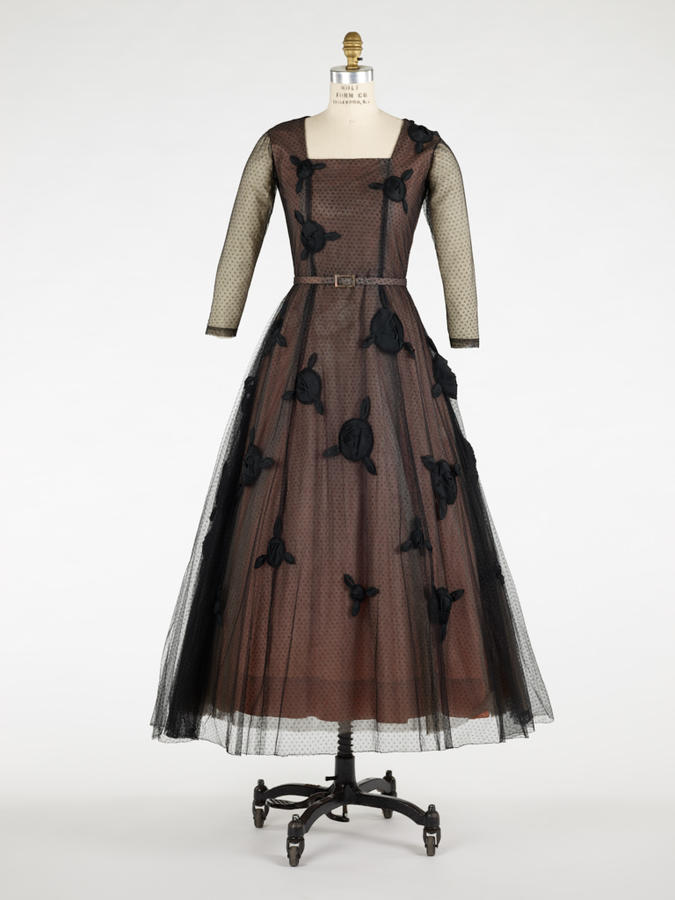
Jacques Griffe dress, mid 1940s. Dotted Swiss net and satin appliqué over pink acetate

Griffe served an apprenticeship for a tailor in Carcassonne, before relocating to Toulouse where he worked for Mirra, a dressmaker there who followed the Paris collections. From 1936 to 1939 he worked with Madeleine Vionnet as a cutter, before launching his own couture house in 1942. Initially based on the rue Gaillon, he later relocated to the rue du Faubourg Saint-Honoré, and eventually took over Edward Molyneux's salon on the rue Royale.

Griffe is particularly known for his mastery of draping, which he developed while at Vionnet, and for his strong technical skills, using complicated shirring, pleating and tucking techniques to shape his garments and form subtle patterns and textures. He paid tribute to his mentor not only through his cutting and draping, but by featuring his own fingerprint on his dress labels as Vionnet herself did. Vionnet also gave him a miniature mannequin to use for developing his designs, and the colleagues eventually became friends in 1948.

His designs are in the collections of many museums, including the Victoria and Albert Museum, the Metropolitan Museum of Art, the RISD Museum, the National Gallery of Victoria, and the Palais Galliera.
