= Swivel weave =

Decorative weave

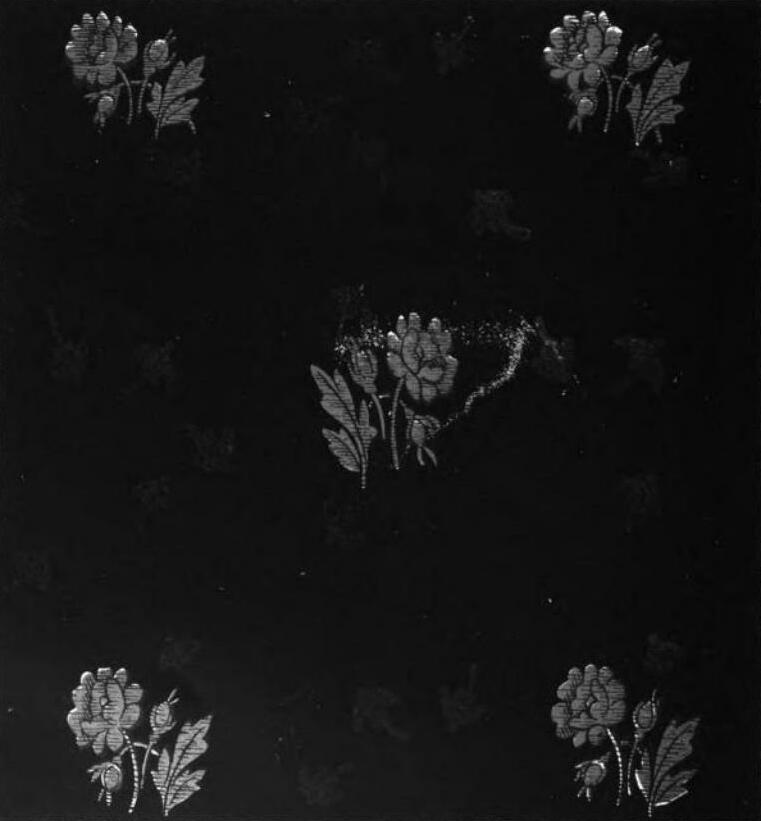
Swivel weaving

The swivel weave is a weaving technique that incorporates a decorative element into the fabric by using small shuttles that insert additional weft thread around selected warp threads, while the main weft thread forms the fabric's structure. This method differs from the plain weave, which lacks this decorative aspect.

== Origins ==
According to sinologist Dieter Kuhn, during the Han dynasty in China, a swivel weaving method was used as part of zhicheng tapestry weaving. During the Ming dynasty, weavers from Nanjing, particularly those specializing in cloud brocade, honed the art of zhuanghua swivel weaving, using colored wefts to form patterns.

In Europe, Dutch and British weavers and inventors started experimenting with swivel weaving looms in the early eighteenth century. By the mid-twentieth century, their use had declined significantly, because similar effects could be produced more efficiently on Jacquard looms.

== Technique ==
Swivel weaving is a decorative technique that involves producing intricate designs on other weaves, such as a basic plain weave structure or satin. In swivel weaving, the weft yarns are used to create patterns on the fabric. The weft threads are interlaced with the warp threads in a specific order to produce the desired pattern on the fabric.

This technique is aided by the use of small auxiliary shuttles that hold and transport the colorful threads, in addition to the main fabric looming fly shuttle. These swivel shuttles are responsible for forming the designs, while the regular shuttle creates the base structure. Swivel weaving is characterized by minimal waste. Typically, contrasting colors were utilized for the designs. The Dotted Swiss is an example of a swivel weave, where dots may be formed on a sheer fabric.

Swivel weaving was superseded by more cost-effective methods for producing patterns on the surface of fabrics.

=== Lappet weave ===
In contrast to swivel weaving, which produces figures with extra weft yarns, lappet weaving employs additional warp yarns. Lappet weaving creates a similar type of weave design on one side, while swivel weaving differs by producing the design on both sides. Additionally, the method of fastening the design yarns in lappet weaving results in the production of more robust fabrics compared to those produced through swivel weaving.

== See also ==
- Yunjin
