= Caroline Doig =

Scottish paediatric surgeon (1938–2019)

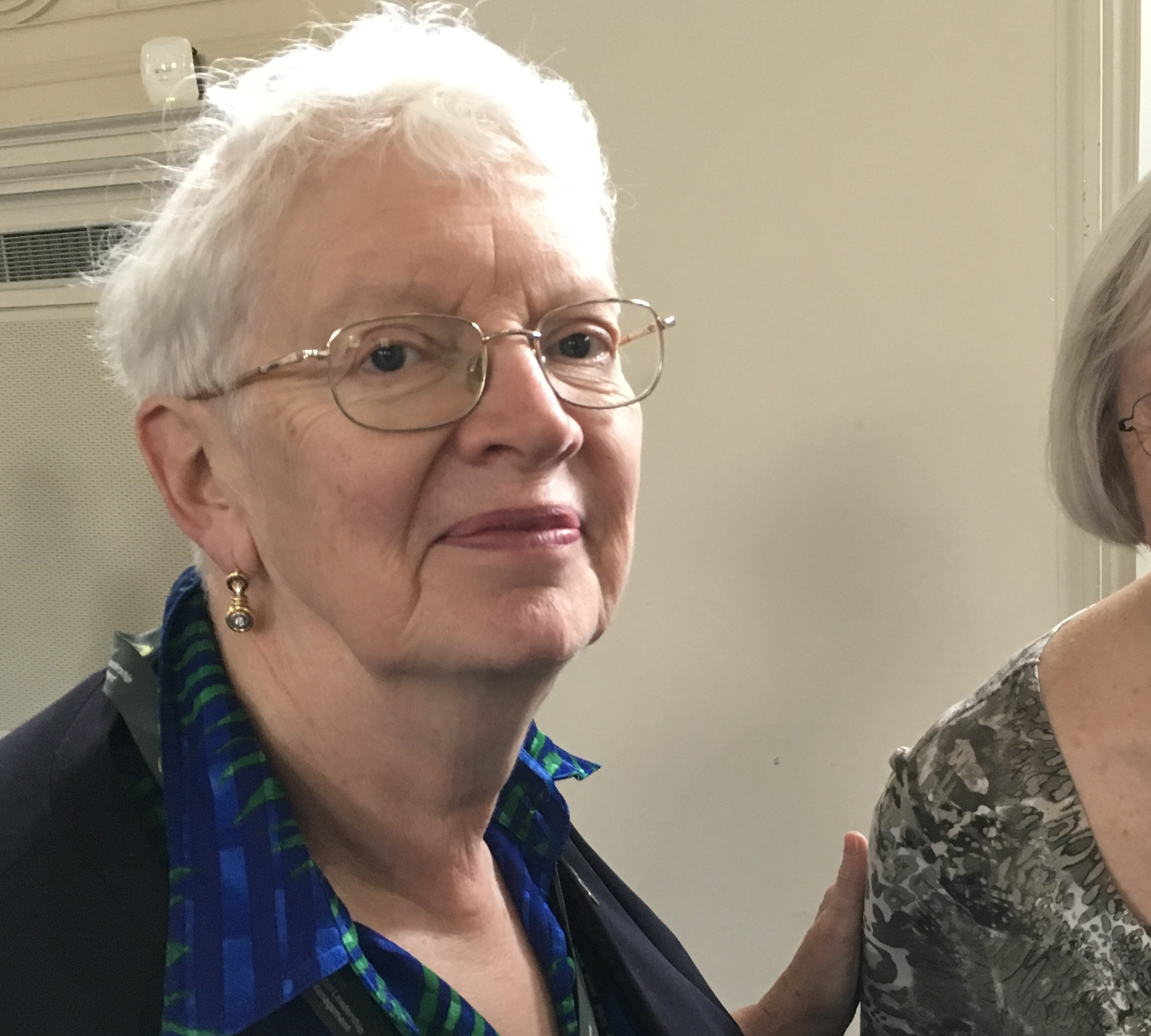
- Born: 1938; Forfar
- Died: 14 November 2019
- Education: University of St Andrews
- Occupation: Surgeon
- Organization(s): Medical Women's Federation, General Medical Council, Royal College of Surgeons of Edinburgh

Caroline Doig (1938 – 14 November 2019) was a paediatric surgeon and the first woman to be elected to the Royal College of Surgeons of Edinburgh council.

== Early life and education ==
Doig was born in Forfar, Scotland, in 1938. She attended the South School in Forfar, and Forfar Academy.

She graduated from the University of St Andrews, and began surgical training in Dundee, followed by paediatric training in Great Ormond Street Hospital in London, where she received her ChM (Master in Surgery) on staphylococcal wound infection and bacterial transmission.

== Career ==
Her first post was at Dundee Royal Infirmary in 1962. In 1975, Doig became a senior lecturer in paediatric surgery at the University of Manchester. She worked as Consultant Paediatric Surgeon at Booth Hall Children's Hospital and St Mary's Hospital in Manchester.

Doig was elected to The Royal College of Surgeons of Edinburgh council in 1984, serving three terms of office. She was the first women elected to Council at The Royal College of Surgeons of Edinburgh and at any royal college.

She was also Chairman of the General Medical Council in 1991, the first woman to hold this position. She was also President of the Medical Women's Federation in the 1980s, a body which promotes women in medicine.

Doig retired in April 2000.

In 2018, she was invited to unveil a plaque at the Royal College of Surgeons of Edinburgh commemorating the achievements of the 'Edinburgh Seven', the first group of matriculated undergraduate female students at any British university.

== Legacy ==
In 2007, the Royal College of Surgeons Edinburgh awarded the first Hunter-Doig Medal. It is named for Caroline Doig and Alice Headwards-Hunter, the first woman to sit and pass the examinations of the Royal College of Surgeons of Edinburgh in 1920. The silver medal is awarded by the Royal College of Surgeons of Edinburgh every second year, recognising excellence within the female membership.

In 2025, the Royal College of Surgeons of Edinburgh unveiled Eleven Surgeons, a painting by Kirstin Mackinnon, which portrays the nine female surgeons who have been awarded the Hunter-Doig medal to date, seated beneath portraits of Doig and Hunter against the backdrop of an old teaching operating theatre. The surgeons depicted are Julie Brittenden, Lorna Marson, Jennifer Robson, Farhat Din, Sandra McAllister, Alice Hartley, Chloe Scott, Emma Stapleton and Beatrix Elsberger. It is only the fourth painting depicting women in their collection.

== Personal life ==
Doig published her autobiography, Enilorac: Hands of a Lady in 2018, on her experiences becoming a surgeon.

Doig died on 14 November 2019, aged 81.
