= Mary Ronald Bisset =

Mary Ronald Bisset (10 April 1876 – 20 January 1953) was a physician and missionary. After she received her medical degrees, she went to Bhiwani, Punjab, India, where she was a medical missionary. She provided care to girls and women and helped establish a hospital for women in Bhiwani. She treated patients during epidemics and sought to reduce the mortality rate during childbirth. In 1931, she was awarded the Kaisar-i-Hind Medal for Public Service in India.

== Early life ==
Mary Ronald Bisset, born 11 April 1876, was the daughter of Rev. Alexander Bisset, who received his M.A. degree in 1865 from the University of Aberdeen. At the time of her birth, her father was the minister of a church in Peterhead in Aberdeenshire, in 1883 at Kirkcaldy, and by 1886 at Aberdeen. He was born in 1842 at the Chapel of Garioch and was the son of Alexander Bisset.

== Medical and missionary career ==
Bisset received her medical degree (M.B.) in 1905 from Aberdeen University. She also received her CH.B. from Aberdeen and Lady Literate in Arts degree from St. Andrews University. She was an eye surgeon and obstetrician.

In 1907, Bisset went to Bhiwani, Punjab, India. She was one of the first women to work as a medical missionary in India. She arrived as a new wing was added to a hospital. Besides caring for people with eye problems, and maternity cases, she treated patients during bubonic plague outbreaks. In 1910 to 1911, there was an epidemic of Phagedaenic ulcer at Palwal and Bisset worked with Dr. Young of the Women's Hospital of Palwal to treat about 600 patients. Both physicians were Zenana medical missionaries who performed amputations and other necessary surgeries.

She sought to reduce the rate of illness and death during childbirth. Bisset wrote that puerperal sepsis was common due to unsanitary conditions, such as dirty bedding and cloths used during childbirth. Believing that circulating air was bad, women were shut up in rooms were a fire was burned to heat the room, regardless of the weather, and any opportunity for circulating air was blocked off. Women were prohibited from drinking water or milk if they developed puerperal sepsis, out of concern for a purulent discharge.

Bisset helped oversee the construction of a hospital for women in Bhiwani that opened in the fall of 1921. In 1931, she worked in Bhiwani at the Zenana Baptist Mission Hospital. She helped Dr. Ellen Farrer provide medical care to girls and women. Both women were awarded the silver and gold Kaisar-i-Hind Medal. Bisset received the award on 1 January 1931.

== Later years and death ==
She lived at 37 Bankhurst Road in London, where she died on 20 January 1953, at age 77.
