= Kaisar-i-Hind Medal =

Kaisar-i-Hind Medal for Public Service in India
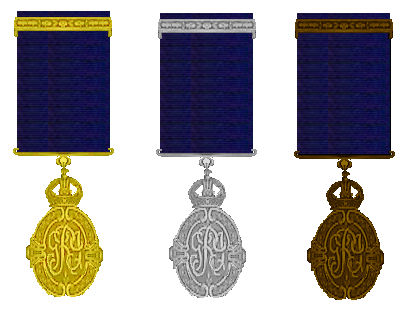
- Representations of the Gold, Silver and Bronze Medals (George V – second type)
- Type: Civil decoration
- Awarded for: Persons considered to have done some public service worthy of recognition by Government
- Country: British Raj
- Presented by: Emperor of India
- Eligibility: Civilians of any nationality
- Campaign: Dormant since 1947
- Established: 10 April 1900
- Ribbon of Kaisar-i-Hind Medal

Precedence
- Next (higher): Order of British India
- Next (lower): Order of St John

The Kaisar-i-Hind Medal for Public Service in India was a medal awarded by the Emperor/Empress of India between 1900 and 1947, to "any person without distinction of race, occupation, position, or sex ... who shall have distinguished himself (or herself) by important and useful service in the advancement of the public interest in India."

The name "Kaisar-i-Hind" (Urdu: قیصرِ ہند qaisar-e-hind) literally means "Emperor of India" in the Urdu language. The word kaisar, meaning "emperor" is a derivative of the Roman imperial title Caesar, via Persian (see Qaysar-i Rum) from Greek Καίσαρ Kaísar, and is cognate with the German title Kaiser, which was borrowed from Latin at an earlier date. Based upon this, the title Kaisar-i-Hind was coined in 1876 by the orientalist G.W. Leitner as the official imperial title for the British monarch in India. The last ruler to bear it was George VI.

Kaisar-i-Hind was also inscribed on the obverse side of the India General Service Medal (1909), as well as on the Indian Meritorious Service Medal.

== History ==
Empress of India or Kaisar-i-Hind, a term coined by the orientalist G.W. Leitner in a deliberate attempt to dissociate British imperial rule from that of preceding dynasties was taken by Queen Victoria from 1 May 1876, and proclaimed at the Delhi Durbar of 1877.

The medal was instituted by Queen Victoria on 10 April 1900. The name translates as "Emperor of India" (a name also used for a rare Indian butterfly, Teinopalpus imperialis). The Royal Warrant for the Kaisar-i-Hind was amended in 1901, 1912, 1933 and 1939. While never officially rescinded, the Kaisar-i-Hind ceased to be awarded following the passage of the Indian Independence Act 1947. The awards of the gold medal were often published in the London Gazette, while other classes were published in the Gazette of India.

== Medal grades and design ==
The medal had three grades. The Kaisar-i-Hind Gold Medal for Public Service in India was awarded directly by the monarch on the recommendation of the Secretary of State for India. Silver and Bronze medals were awarded by the Viceroy. The medal consisted of an oval-shaped badge or decoration in gold, silver or bronze with the Royal Cipher and Monarchy on one side, and the words "Kaisar-i-Hind for Public Service in India" on the other. It was to be worn suspended from the left breast by a dark blue ribbon. The medal has no post-nominal initials.

One of its most famous recipient is Mahatma Gandhi, who was awarded the Kaisar-i-Hind in 1915 by The Lord Hardinge of Penshurst for his contribution to ambulance services in South Africa. Gandhi returned the medal following the Jallianwala Bagh massacre carried out by the British officials and wrote, "In European countries, condonation of such grievous wrongs as the khilafat and the Punjab would have resulted in bloody revolution by the people."

== Notable recipients ==
Award of the Medal and Bar to the Medal

- Lillian Agnes Starr, Gold Medal with Bar; awarded in 1923 as Matron-in-charge of the C.M.S. Mission Hospital, Peshawar
- Olive Monahan, Gold Medal with Bar; retired Chief Medical Officer Kalyani Hospital, Madras
- Cornelia Sorabji, Gold Medal with Bar; first female advocate in India; first woman to practice law in India and Britain
- Lucia Navamani Virasinghe-Chinnappa, awarded Medal 1937 & Bar to the Medal 1941; pioneered maternity and child health on the Indian subcontinent.

Award of the medal

Gold medal

- Sardar Khan Bahadur Mir Abdul Ali, JP, Bombay, 9 November 1901
- Dr Margaret Ida Balfour, Scottish doctor and campaigner for women's medical health issues
- Dr Mary Ronald Bisset, Scottish physician and missionary for women's medical health.
- Florence Mary Macnaghten, British - Scottish CMS nurse / in charge of the Canadian Zanana Mission Hospital at Kangra, Punjab, India, for 1905 earthquake relief work and for women's medical health.
- Richard Burn, for famine services in 1907–08
- Shankar Madhav Chitnavis, Esq., Deputy-Commissioner, Central Provinces, 9 November 1901
- Major General Thomas Arthur Cooke, for distinguished service in the advancement of the interests of the British Raj
- Jim Corbett, 2 January 1928
- The Lady Curzon of Kedleston, for distinguished service in the advancement of the interests of the British Raj
- Major Herbert Edward Deane, R.A.M.C., 9 November 1901
- Major Thomas Edward Dyson, MB, CM, Indian Medical Service, 9 November 1901
- Mrs E J Firth, of Madras, awarded medal on 9 November 1901 for distinguished service in the advancement of the interests of the British Raj
- Lieutenant Colonel Robert Shore, Irish Surgeon, M.A., M.D., R.U.I., L.F.P.S.G., Indian Medical Service, 1 January 1906
- Mohandas Karamchand Gandhi (returned 1920)
- V. Krishnaswamy Iyer (justice of the madras high court) He was awarded the Medal for his public service contributions
- Major General Sir William Forbes Gatacre, chairman of the plague committee of Bombay City 1896 and 1897
- N S Glazebrook, Esq., JP, of Bombay, 9 November 1901
- Very Rev John A. Graham, D.D., for distinguished service in the advancement of the interests of the British Raj
- Thomas Holderness, for distinguished service in the advancement of the interests of the British Raj
- Sydney Hutton Cooper Hutchinson, Esq., AMICE, Superintendent of Telegraphs, 9 November 1901
- The Most Hon Alice Isaacs, Marchioness of Reading
- Reverend William Henry Jackson of the Blind School, Kemmendine, Rangoon, awarded the gold medal for public services in India, 1930.
- Colonel Sir Samuel Swinton Jacob, KCIE, Indian Staff Corps, 9 November 1901
- Hakim Ajmal Khan, physician and one of the founders of the Jamia Millia Islamia University
- Isabel Kerr, Scottish medical missionary in India in the early 20th-century, created the Victoria Leprosy Centre in Hyderabad, and worked to cure leprosy across India.
- Taw Sein Ko, for distinguished service in the advancement of the interests of the British Raj
- Harrington Verney Lovett, Esq., Indian Civil Service, 9 November 1901
- Elizabeth Adelaide Manning, awarded the medal in 1904 for distinguished service in the advancement of the interests of the British Raj
- Sir Francis William Maclean, for distinguished service in the advancement of the interests of the British Raj
- Herbert Frederick Mayes, Esq., Barrister-at-Law, Indian Civil Service, 9 Nov 1901
- Lieutenant-Colonel James McCloghry, FRCS, Indian Medical Service, 9 November 1901
- Miss Eleanor McDougall, awarded Medal of the First Class in June 1923 for her work as Principal of the Women's Christian College, Madras
- A Donald Miller, MBE, (1939) for work with the Leprosy Mission 1921-1942
- Rev Charles Henry Monahan, awarded Medal of the First Class in February 1937 for his work as General Superintendent, Methodist Missionary Society, Madras
- Olive Monahan, Gold Medal with Bar, retired Chief Medical Officer Kalyani Hospital, Madras
- Sarojini Naidu, Received gold medal for organising flood relief work in Hyderabad, later returned in protest over Jallianwala Bagh massacre.
- Amina Hydari - social worker, reformer, activist. Received medal for organising flood relief work in Hyderabad during the Musi floods.
- Vidyagauri Nilkanth, social reformer, educationist, and writer
- William Florey Noyce, Esq., Extra-Assistant Commissioner and Assistant Secretary to the Financial Commissioner, Burma, 9 November 1901
- Dr John David O′Donnell, MBE, VD, FRCSEd, Chief Medical and Sanitary Officer, Kolar Gold Fields, Mysore, July 1926
- Babu Sri Ram, Rai Bahadur, for distinguished service in the advancement of the interests of the British Raj
- V. P. Madhava Rao, CIE
- Mary Reed (missionary), 1917, for missionary services to lepers
- Thomas d'Esterre Roberts, S.J., Archbishop of Bombay, for services to the forces during World War II
- HH Madho Rao Scindia, Maharaja Scindia of Gwalior
- Lieutenant-Colonel Sir David Semple, for distinguished service in the advancement of the interests of the British Raj
- Rai Bahadur Kameleshwari Pershad Singh of Monghyr, Bengal
- HH Ganga Singh, Maharaja of Bikaner
- Maharaja Rameshwar Singh Bahadur of Darbhanga
- Donald Mackenzie Smeaton CSI, Scottish Liberal MP and Indian civil servant
- Cornelia Sorabji, Gold Medal with Bar, first female advocate in India, first woman to practice law in India and Britain
- Robert Barton Stewart, Esq., Indian Civil Service, 9 November 1901
- Dr William Stokes, for distinguished service in the advancement of the interests of the British Raj
- Rev Dr Frederick Vincent Thomas, Baptist Medical Mission, Palwal
- Edgar Thurston, for distinguished service in the advancement of the interests of the British Raj
- Gajadhar Upadhaya, Esq., Chief Regimental Religious Teacher, 1st (K.G.V.s Own) G.R. [Gurkha Rifles]
- Raja Ravi Verma, for distinguished service in the advancement of the interests of the British Raj
- Captain Edmund Wilkinson, FRCS, Indian Medical Service, 9 November 1901
- HH Rajagopala Krishna Yachendra, Maharaja of Venkatagiri.
- Arthur Delaval Younghusband, civil servant, awarded for distinguished service in the advancement of the interests of the British Raj
- Lieutenant Colonel Sir Francis Edward Younghusband, British Army officer, explorer, and spiritual writer
- Dr Jean Murray Orkney, Chief Medical Officer, Women's Medical Service
- Jane Leeke Latham, missionary head in 1938.
- Dhanvanthi Rama Rau for her work with women's associations.

Silver medal

- Kheroth Bose, medical missionary, for bringing medical care to rural India.
- Blanche Brenton Carey, Church of England Zenana Missionary in Karachi, for services to the women and girls of India, 1928.
- Sita Devi Sahiba, Maharajkumarani of Kapurthala, New Year's Honours list 1944
- Diana Hartley, General and Organising Secretary of the Trained Nurses Association of India, 1944
- Alice Headwards-Hunter, surgeon, 1945
- Dr Mina MacKenzie, medical doctor for over 30 years of public service in India, including helping control the cholera epidemic during the 1906 Kumbh Mela pilgrimage
- Dr Alexandrina Matilda MacPhail, medical missionary
- Clare Spurgin, for establishing a hospital for wives of Indian Army soldiers
- Alexander Steel, for services to cotton growing
- Helen Vorley, for her part in facilitating the evacuation of 300,000 Indians from Burma in 1942
- Sir William James Wanless, for distinguished service in the advancement of the interests of the British Raj

Bronze medal

- Clara Anne Williams (née Rendall), 1946, for her work during WWII being in-charge of Red Cross Work in Dooars, Bengal.

Unknown grade

1930 Captain Albert Edward Warhurst for service to the people of India during the 1929 floods in Assam

- Dewan Bahadur Justice C.V. Viswanatha Sastri
- Kaviraja Shyamaldas (1836–1893), one of the first modern Indian historian and author of Vir Vinod; Kaviraja and Dewan of Udaipur State
- Frederick Booth-Tucker, Commissioner in the Salvation Army
- General Sir Charles John Burnett
- Alfred Bramwell Cook, chief medical officer of the Emery Hospital, Anand, Gujarat
- Liston Garthwaite (May, 1900)
- Khamliana Sailo, a Mizo chief, for developing of terracing, poultry farming, fruits, tobacco and turmeric including agricultural businesses in Mizoram.
- Isabel Kerr (1923), medical missionary, for working with lepers
- Florence Mary Macnaghten
- HH Sayajirao Gaekwad III, Maharaja of Baroda
- HH Bhagvatsingh, Maharaja of Gondal
- HH Tukojirao Holkar II, Maharaja of Indore
- HH Sultan Shah Jahan, Begum of Bhopal
- Khan Bahadur Raja Jahandad Khan
- Seth Jehangir Hormusji Kothari, merchant and philanthropist from Karachi (present-day Pakistan)
- HH Khengarji III, Maharao of Kutch
- Pandita Ramabai, for distinguished service in the advancement of the interests of the British Raj
- Edward Sell, missionary and Islamic scholar
- Udai Pratap Nath Shah Deo, Maharaja of Chotanagpur
- HH Pratap Singh, Maharaja of Idar
- HH Partab Singh, Maharaja of Kashmir
- HH Ram Singh, Maharaja of Bharatpur
- HH Nihal Singh, Rana of Dholpur
- Dr Howard Somervell, OBE, for distinguished service in the advancement of the interests of the British Raj
- Sir Robert Stanes, for distinguished service in the advancement of the interests of the British Raj
- Parukutty Nethyar Amma (Lady Rama Varma of Cochin) received the medal in 1919 for public work.
- Sister R. S. Subbalakshmi, educationist and social worker, Madras, for the educating and upliftment of child widows, in 1920
- Muniamma of Nungambakkam, Zamindarini, for charitable service of rural underprivileged classes of the British Raj.
- HH Ayilyam Thirunal, Maharaja of Travancore
- HH Visakham Thirunal, Maharaja of Travancore
- Sir Vicar-ul-Umra, for distinguished service in the advancement of the interests of the British Raj
- Bharat Ratna Sir Mokshagundam Visveswaraiah, KCIE, Indian engineer, scholar, statesman and the Diwan of Mysore
- Charlotte Viall Wiser, co-author of Behind Mud Walls, nutritionist, and Presbyterian missionary
- Mona Chandravati Gupta, Myanmar-born Indian social worker, educationist and the founder of Nari Sewa Samiti, a non governmental organization working for the social and economic upliftment of women
- Silverine Swer, Khasi environmental and social activist
- Khan Bahadur Abu Nasr Muhammad Yahia, Zamindar and Honorary Magistrate of Sylhet, for public services in British India

== See also ==
- British and Commonwealth orders and decorations
