= Edward Mary Joseph Molyneux =

British painter

Edward Molyneux CIE DSO
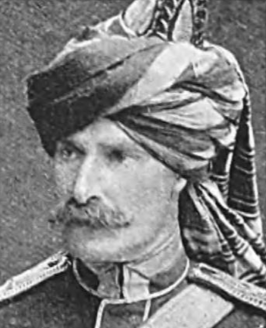
- Born: 13 March 1866
- Died: 29 January 1913 (aged 46); Ambala, India
- Education: Stonyhurst College; Royal Military College, Sandhurst
- Spouse: Mary Knolles (m. 1902)
- Military career
- Allegiance: United Kingdom
- Branch: British Indian Army
- Service years: 1887–1913
- Unit: 12th Bengal Cavalry
- Conflicts: Tirah campaign; Second Boer War; Battle of Paardeberg (WIA); Battle of Vaal Krantz; Battle of the Tugela Heights; Relief of Ladysmith; Battle of Laing's Nek
- Awards: Mentioned in dispatches x 2

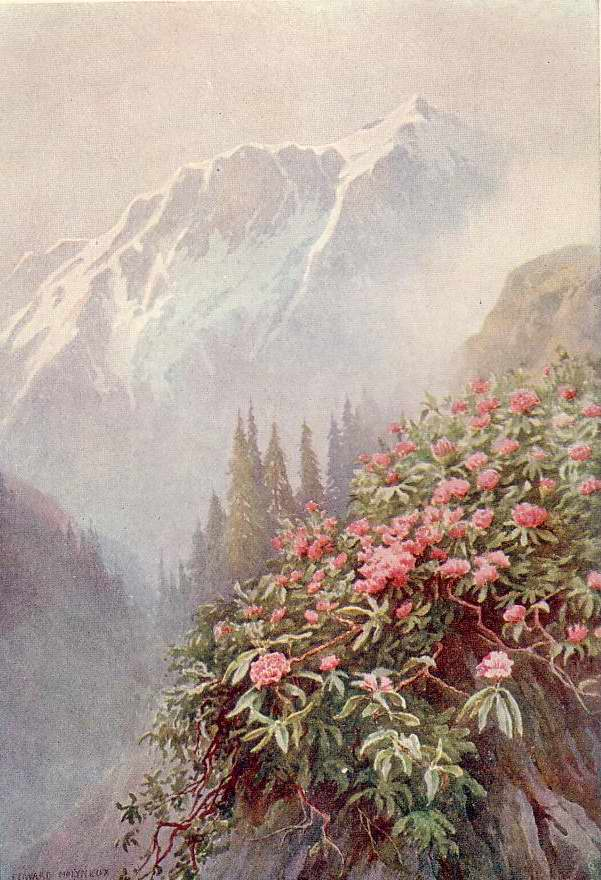
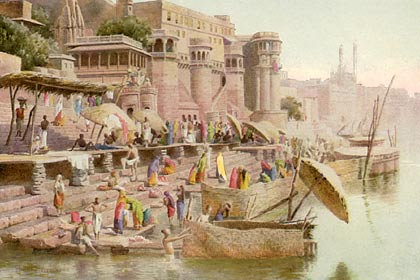
Paintings by Major Edward M. J. Molyneux: Wild rhododendrons in Kashmir (left) and Benares (right; 1890)

Major Edward Mary Joseph Molyneux CIE DSO (13 March 1866 – 29 January 1913) was a British painter.

During his years in the Himalayan Valley of Kashmir, Molyneux painted many scenes of the capital city of Srinagar and other areas which inspired him. The paintings were published in a book titled Kashmir (1909), accompanied by descriptions of the Valley by Francis Younghusband.

His nephew was Edward Henry Molyneux, fashion designer.
