= Blanche Brenton Carey =

British Protestant missionary in Karachi

Blanche Louisa Mary Boleyn Brenton Carey
- Born: 1856; Bath, Somerset, United Kingdom
- Died: 25 May 1950 (aged 94); Karachi, Pakistan
- Parent(s): Rev. Adolphus Frederick Carey; Harriet Mary Brenton
- Religion: Christianity
- Church: Anglican
- Title: Kaisar-i-Hind Silver medal

Blanche Louisa Mary Boleyn Brenton Carey (1856 - 1950) was a Church of England Zenana Mission Society (CEZMS) pioneer missionary to Karachi (1885 to 1950).

Blanche Brenton Carey's ministry in Karachi spanned a number of cataclysmic world and national events: plague epidemics, World War I, The Great Depression, political unrest, World War II and the Partition of India and the new state of Pakistan. When she first arrived in Karachi in 1885 there was one school of fifteen girl pupils. Over time, this grew to be nine schools with about 900 girl students, an orphanage, a Teacher Training College, and a Widows' Industrial Class. The schools used different languages spoken at the time in Karachi, Gujarati, Sindhi, and Arabic.

Blanche Brenton Carey was known for her love and support for the women of Sindh and her great zeal for evangelism. She visited the villages outside of Karachi, often travelling many miles by railway and then camel.

== Family ==
Blanche Louisa Mary Boleyn Brenton Carey was born in Bath, Somerset, England in 1856. Her father was the Rev. Adolphus Frederick Carey and her mother was Harriet Mary Brenton (a distinguished author and poet). Her grandfather was Vice admiral Jahleel Brenton. Blanche Brenton Carey had two sisters and six brothers. Amongst her six brothers were Jahleel Brenton Carey, Captain in the British Army, and Reginald Orme Brenton Carey, Admiral in the Mexican Navy.

Her father became the vicar of Brixham, Devon, England in 1861 and Blanche Brenton Carey's formative years were spent here. She helped in the Sunday School and helped her father in the parish as she visited many of the young women.

In 1884 she applied to become a missionary for the CEZMS. She was accepted and was sent out to Karachi in 1885.

== Early years in Karachi ==
At the time of her arrival Karachi was a port town and there were many different languages spoken by the people in the town. Urdu was the common commercial and business language used in the streets but many spoke Marathi, Arabic, Sindhi, and Gujarati.

Blanche Brenton Carey was sent to Karachi as a second to a more experienced missionary Miss M T Condon. She began learning Sindhi as soon as she arrived so that she could talk to the parents and girls in their native language. Some thought that they would not be able to recruit the teachers needed to establish the mission work. However they were able to find a number of Christian women who were able to assist them in the work and to speak the necessary languages.

There was strong opposition to the work from the community.

== Growth ==
Through much perseverance the work began to grow and new schools were opened. The staff were found to teach the girls in their own languages, and assistant missionaries joined to visit the parents.

In 1894 due to ill health Miss M T Condon had to leave Karachi and Blanche Brenton Carey took over the responsibility of the mission station in Karachi.

The mission set up an outstation in the village of Jhirak, outside of Karachi, with accommodation, a school, and a place where simple medicines could be distributed to the sick.

People started to ask Blanche Brenton Carey if she would be willing to house orphans as many parents died by famine and disease. So in 1902 Blanche started an orphanage for the destitute girls.

Due to famine, and plague there were a good number of widows and Blanche Brenton Carey responded to the need of the people of Karachi by opening a Widows' Industrial Class. The widows in the Industrial Class would learn to read and write and develop needle work skills to help them earn a living.

A new school building was needed and after much fund raising the Queen Alexandra School was built and opened in 1921.

== Recognition ==
In the 1928 Royal Birthday List, Blanche Brenton Carey was awarded the Kaisar-i-Hind medal for her services to the women and girls of India.

== Trials ==
The Plague (disease) was a constant source of interruption for the mission station. At the time of the great plague epidemic in 1896, the schools in Karachi closed and much of the population left the city to live in segregation huts. Blanche Brenton Carey went to help the people.

The girls' education would also end when they married at a young age.

In 1921 the missionaries' accommodation collapsed and they had to wait seven years before a new mission bungalow was built to accommodate the workers.

The mission station in Karachi faced financial difficulties as a result of the world wars.

In 1929 Blanche Brenton Carey became ill and the illness was misdiagnosed as malaria. However, she did not recover and a second opinion was sought. It was discovered that she had cancer of the uterus, and she had to undergo an urgent operation. Most of the cancer was removed and she was sent home to recuperate. She recovered and returned to Karachi in 1931.

There was also political opposition to British rule in India and in 1935 there was a riot in Karachi.

In 1947 the partition of India took place and Karachi became part of the new state of Pakistan. The Queen Alexandra School became a haven for Muslim refugees who were flooding into Karachi from India. Most of the mission station schools closed.

== Jubilee ==
Blanche Brenton Carey celebrate her fiftieth year of service in 1935. The day of her jubilee was set aside as a day of prayer as she requested. The following day there was a less formal celebration with bus loads of children attending, and she was given flower garlands by all the schools.

== Last Days ==
Blanche Brenton Carey continued to work into her nineties. She died in 1950; many of the young women who had known her since childhood looked after her as she was dying. She was buried in Karachi.

== Archive ==
The Cadbury Research Library (University of Birmingham) holds the Church of England Zenana Missionary Society archive collections concerning Blanche Brenton Carey: her magazine articles, annual reports, application form and correspondence.

Adam Matthew Digital holds the digital Church Missionary Society archive collections which includes the CEZMS periodical India's Women and China's Daughters where there are many articles written by Blanche Brenton Carey.
