= Lucia Virasinghe-Chinnappa =

Sri Lankan medical doctor

Lucia Navamani Virasinghe-Chinnappa (30 December, 1894 - 1980) was a Sri Lankan medical doctor specialising in maternal and infant health.

== Biography ==
Virasinghe-Chinnappa was born in Sri Lanka. Her mother was Sophia Muthamma and her father was Reverend Arulambulam Virasinghe. She studied at St. Margaret's Anglican Convent in Colombo, and then moved to Madras, India, to attend the Madras Medical College, graduating in 1916.

She was appointed superintendent of the maternity and child welfare scheme in Madras, and developed a network of health centres with women medical officers to cover the city. In 1926, she was appointed a tutor for women students at the Madras Medical College. From 1930 until her retirement in 1948, she served as assistant director of public health, in charge of maternity and child welfare in Madras.

Virasinghe-Chinnappa was awarded the Kaisar-i-Hind Medal, and subsequently the Bar to the Medal, for her services to maternity and child health.

Virasinghe-Chinnappa died in 1980 in Canberra, Australia.

== Personal life ==
In 1921, Virasinghe-Chinnappa married her cousin, James Chelvanayagam Chinnappa. The couple had a son, James Chandrasekaran Virasinghe Chinnappa, and a daughter, Malati, who also became medical doctors.

== Legacy ==
The Lucia Navamani Virasinghe Chinnappa Chapel is located at the hostel of St. John's College in Jaffna, Sri Lanka.
