= Alice Headwards-Hunter =

Alice Mabel Headwards-Hunter
- Born: 29 May 1888; India
- Died: 11 September 1973 (aged 85); Edinburgh, Scotland
- Known for: First female Fellow of RCSEd; Child and Women's Health; Kaiser-i-Hind medal winner

Alice Mabel Headwards-Hunter, LAH, FRCSEd (29 May 1888 – 11 September 1973) was the first woman to become a Fellow of the Royal College of Surgeons of Edinburgh (RCSEd). She was born in India, educated in England and qualified as a doctor by becoming a licentiate of the Apothecaries Hall of Ireland (LAH). To gain surgical experience she returned to India serving as a Captain in the Royal Army Medical Corps (RAMC) then working at Peshawar Municipal Hospital. After becoming the first woman Fellow of the RCSEd in 1920, she returned to India where she spent the rest of her professional life, caring mainly for women and children. The Indian Government recognised her service by the award of the Kaiser-i-Hind medal and the Hunter Doig Medal, awarded by the RCSEd is named for her.

== Early life ==
Alice Mabel Headwards-Hunter was born in India in 1888, the daughter of Lillian Mary Headwards (née Vardon) and her husband John James Headwards, an Indian Army Officer. She received her education in England and in 1910 graduated LAH as a licentiate of the Apothecaries Hall of Ireland.

== Career ==
Headwards-Hunter returned to India in 1918 and worked initially in a British troop hospital as a captain in the Royal Army Medical Corps. After the war she took a post at the Peshawar Municipal Hospital focusing on women and child health.

She returned to Europe and in 1920, became the first woman to obtain the F.R.C.S.Ed diploma from the Royal College of Surgeons Edinburgh. In 1919, the Sex Disqualification Removal Act was passed in Great Britain making it illegal to exclude any woman from employment because of her gender. In the months following the passing of this Act, Nancy Astor became the first woman to sit as Member of Parliament and, on 20 October 1920, Headwards-Hunter became the first woman to be admitted as a Fellow of the Royal College of Surgeons of Edinburgh.

Returning to Calcutta in 1923, she set up a private practice concerned with woman and children. Hunter was actively involved in development of health visitor training in India.

She was also divisional surgeon to the Calcutta Brigade of the St John Ambulance, an organisation that she was to support throughout her life. She particularly valued the honour of Serving Sister and honorary life member of St John Ambulance awarded in 1946. She became President of the YMCA in Calcutta and later President of all India YWCA.

In 1933, she went as a front line St John's Ambulance doctor to the area which had been devastated by the Monghyr earthquake. The Second World War saw her practice intensify particularly when fighting reached the Indian/Burmese border.

In 1942, she was one of the first Western women to go into Nepal, which at that time, remained a closed country. She was to attend the Crown Princess of Nepal. The following year, during the Bengal famine, she was asked by the Bengal government to set up a temporary hospital for child famine victims.

Her work was recognised in 1945 when she was awarded the Kaisar-i-Hind Silver Medal.

She continued to work in India and Pakistan until her retirement in the 1950s when she and her husband moved to Ireland.

== Death ==
She died in Bruntsfield Hospital, Edinburgh on 11 September 1973.

== Legacy ==
In 2007, the Royal College of Surgeons Edinburgh awarded the first Hunter-Doig Medal. The medal is presented to a female RCSEd Member or Fellow in recognition of excellence. It is named for Alice Headwards-Hunter as first female Fellow of the College and Caroline Doig, the first female member of the College Council. The award is presented to female surgeons who show both excellence and potential to advance their field. The Surgeons Hall Museum wrote that this award is given because, "[...] two female surgeons both of whom have achieved something no women had before".

In 2025, the Royal College of Surgeons of Edinburgh unveiled Eleven Surgeons, a painting by Kirstin Mackinnon, which portrays the nine female surgeons who have been awarded the Hunter-Doig medal to date, seated beneath portraits of Hunter and Doig against the backdrop of an old teaching operating theatre. The surgeons depicted are Julie Brittenden, Lorna Marson, Jennifer Robson, Farhat Din, Sandra McAllister, Alice Hartley, Chloe Scott, Emma Stapleton and Beatrix Elsberger. It is only the fourth painting depicting women in their collection.
