= Dotted Swiss (fabric) =

Sheer fabric embellished with small dots

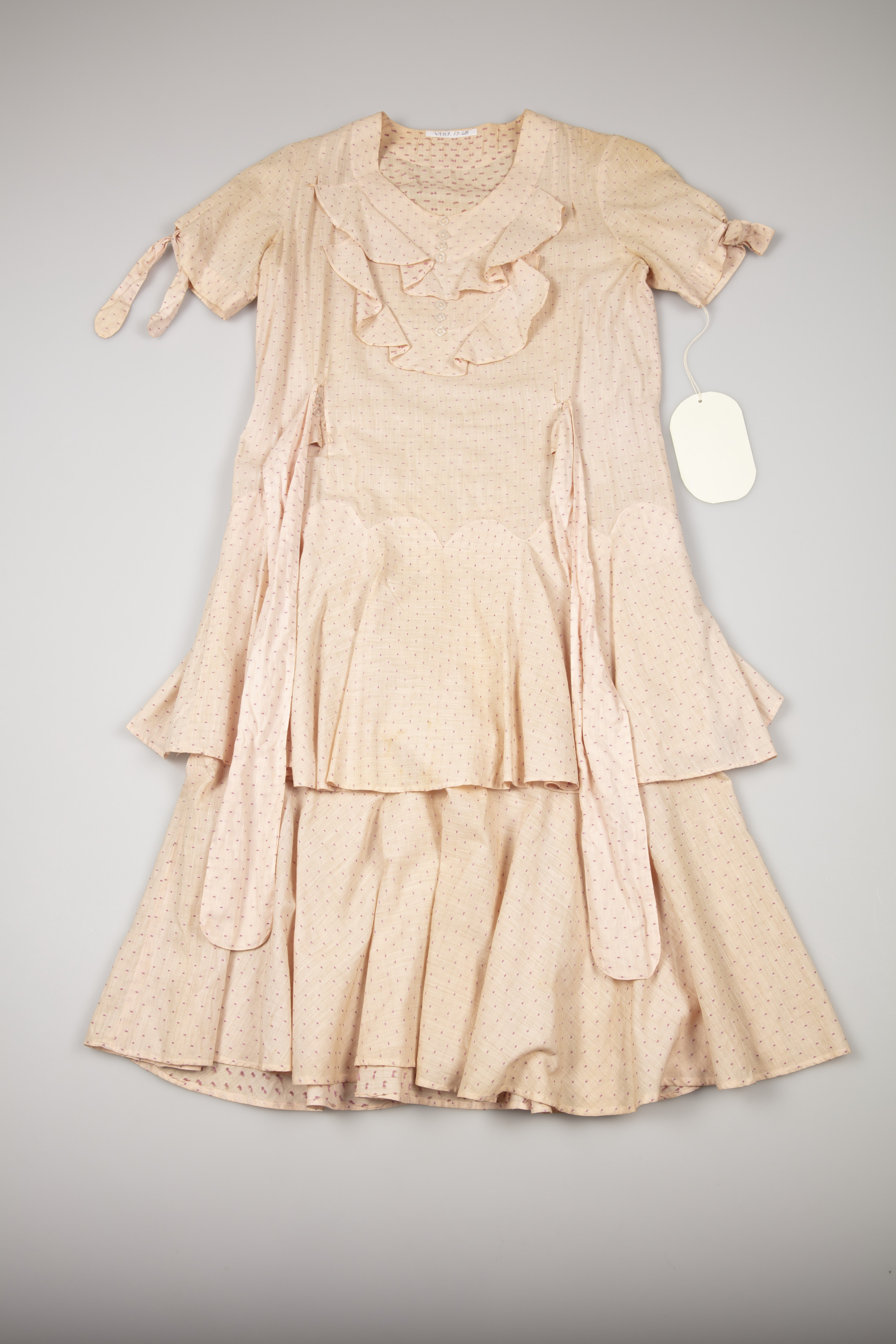

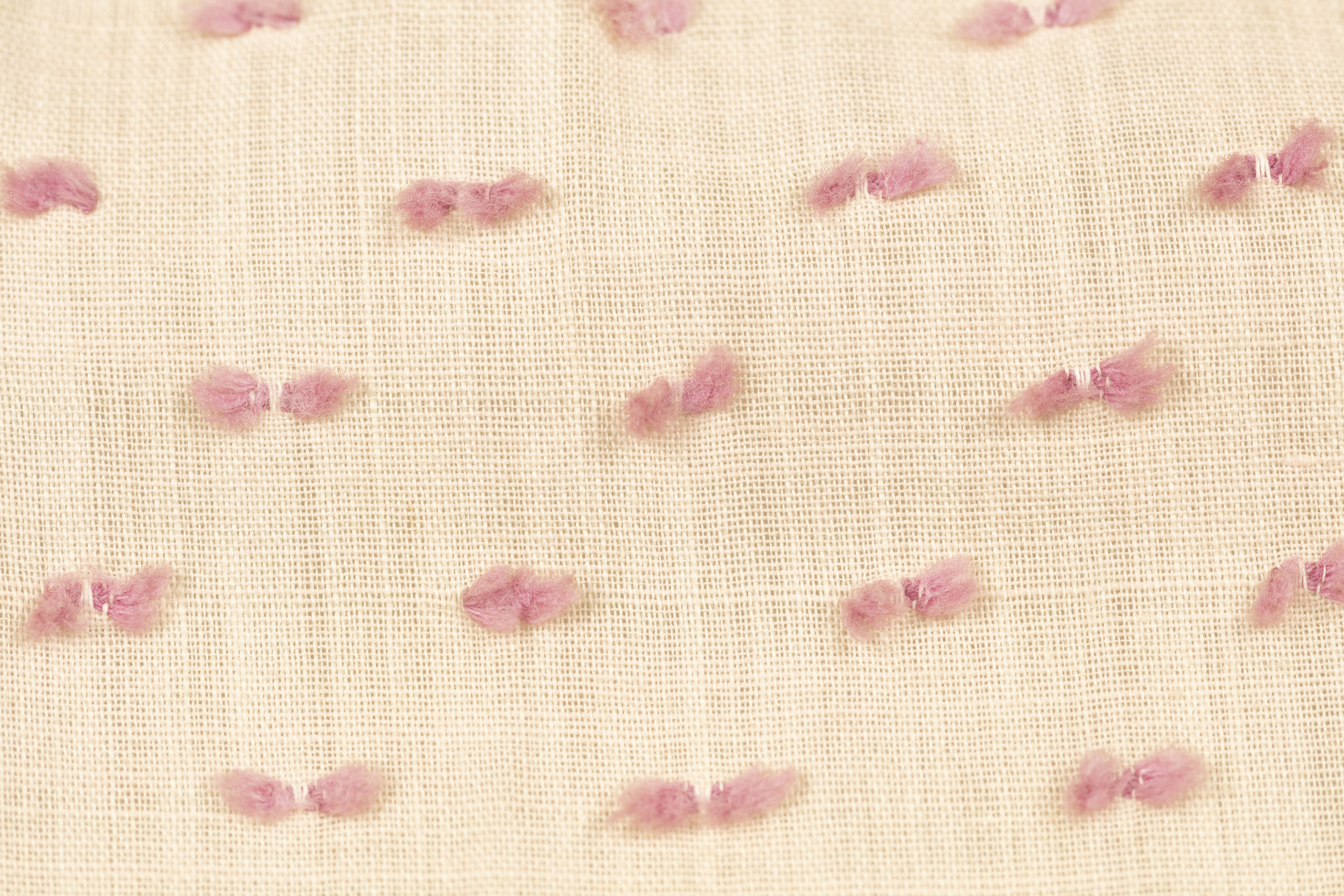
Dress of pale pink dotted Swiss once belonging to Anne Morrow Lindbergh, with a detail showing texture (Missouri Historical Society)

Dotted Swiss, or Swiss Dot, is a sheer cotton fabric embellished with small dots. It is a fine, lightweight plain weave cotton fabric, ornamented with embroidery or flocking with dotted patterns.

The dots sequence is possible in several ways and colors. The placement of dots can be regular to irregular and single color or multicolor. The dots could be of the same as ground color or different also. The cloth is usually made crisp with temporary finishes.

== Origin ==
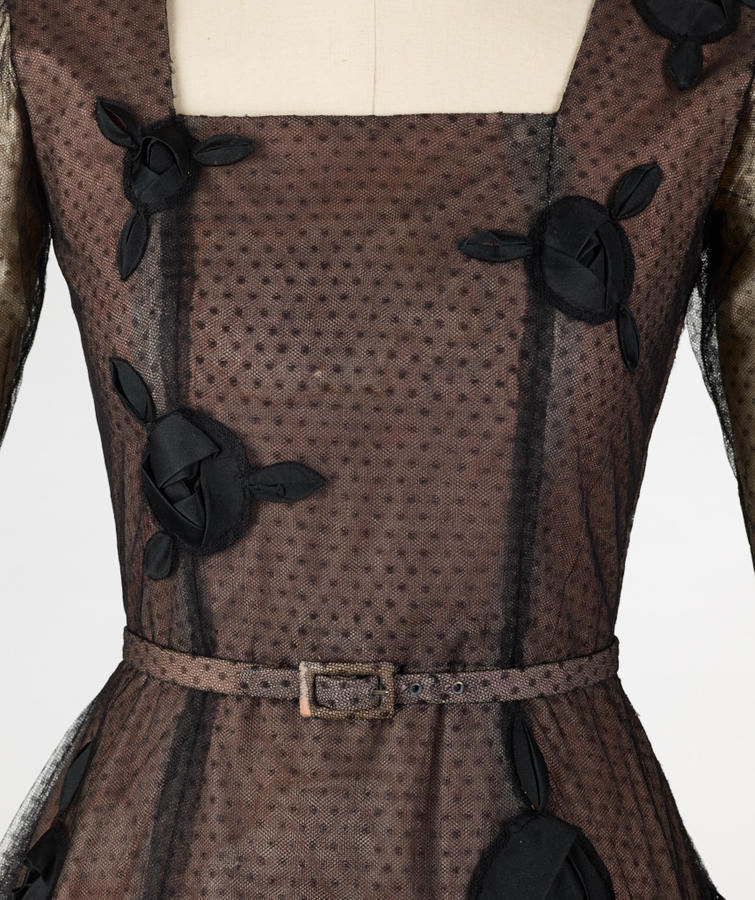
Dotted Swiss lace and satin appliqué over pink acetate (Jacques Griffe, mid-1940s, Rhode Island School of Design Museum)

The fabric was made on handlooms in Switzerland. The design is said to have originated around 1750 in St. Gallen, Switzerland, which emerged as a textile center in the 15th century. It was made of cotton on handlooms with thirty two inches of width. Originally the dots were produced with swivel weaving, a technique of weaving that allowed colorful designs to be woven onto a base fabric, a technique which was gradually replaced with embroidery, flocking and printing etc. In modern times blended fabrics are also used to make dotted swiss.

== Application and use ==
The fabric is suitable for wedding dresses, shirts and fuller dresses, blouses, baby clothes, and curtains.
