= Yunjin =

Traditional Chinese luxury silk brocade

Yunjin (云锦)
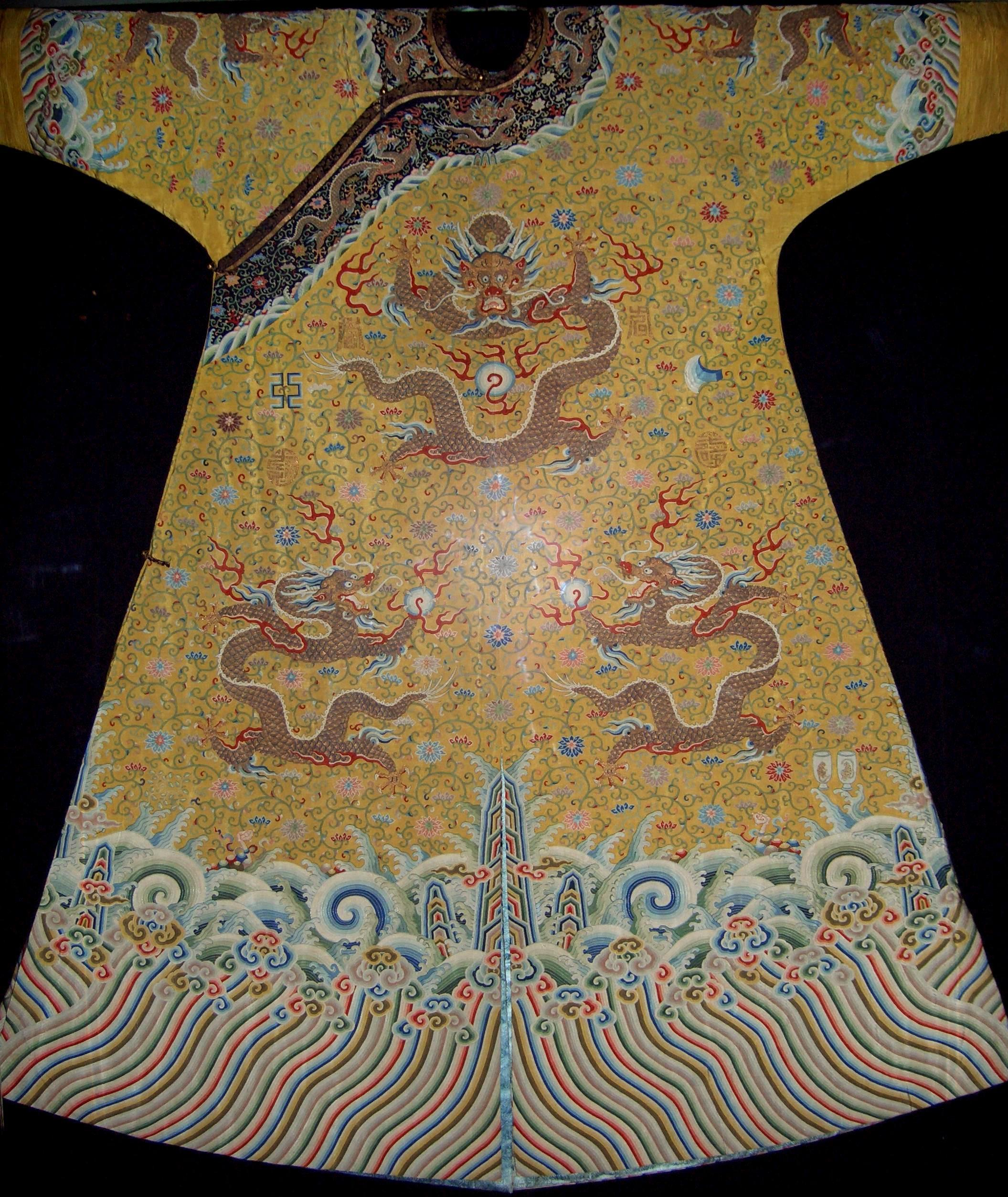
- Dragon robe of the Qianlong Emperor (1711–99) in Yunjin brocade at the Grassi Museum in Leipzig
- Traditional Chinese: 雲錦
- Simplified Chinese: 云锦
- Literal meaning: "Cloud brocade"
Transcriptions
Standard Mandarin
- Hanyu Pinyin: yún jǐn

Yunjin (Chinese: 雲錦), Nanjing brocade or cloud brocade, is a traditional Chinese luxury silk brocade made in Nanjing since the end of the Song dynasty, and based on weft-weaving techniques from both the Song and Tang dynasties. It is shuttle-woven, and often incorporates gold and silver threads with the coloured silks. During the Ming dynasty, the yunjin weavers developed a technique of swivel weaving that enabled them to weave colourful designs onto a base fabric in other weaves, such as satin. In 2009, Nanjing brocade was selected into the representative list of oral and intangible heritage of humanity at UNESCO.

== History ==
The history of brocade in Nanjing can be traced back to the Three Kingdoms period (220-280). In a war, which broke out at the end of the Eastern Jin Dynasty (317-420), General Liu Yu defeated the Xi'an-based Later Qin kingdom (384-417). The victory brought all the craftsmen in Xi'an back to Jiankang, now Nanjing City, among whom brocade-weavers were a dominant force. The brocade weavers were top craftsmen nationwide and had learned many skills from minority ethnic groups. The Eastern Jin government had set up a special brocade office in Nanjing to manage the production of the brocade, which represented the formal establishment of Nanjing brocade. In the Qing Dynasty, "Jiangning Weaving Department" was established in Nanjing. When Nanjing Yunjin weaving peaked, it had more than 30,000 looms and nearly 300,000 people made a living in these fields. It was Nanjing's largest handicraft industry at that time.

== Features ==
Nanjing yunjin brocade is regarded as one of the best forms of silk. It is famous for its cloud-like colours and intricate patterns. Nanjing yunjin brocades are famous for their exquisite technology, elegant patterns and smooth texture. The patterns are as various and as beautiful as the clouds in the sky, hence its name "Yunjin".

== See also ==
- History of silk
- Chinese embroidery
