= Liston Garthwaite =

British educator in India

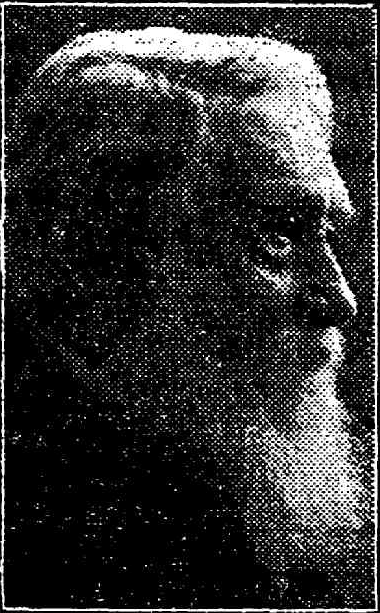
- Born: James Grant Liston Garthwaite; 1833
- Died: 21 December 1918 (aged 84–85); Glenelg, South Australia, Australia
- Occupations: educator, author and translator
- Years active: 1857–1888
- Known for: headmaster of schools in India
- Notable work: Braille compatible for thirteen Indian languages

James Grant Liston Garthwaite (1833 – 21 December 1918) was a British educator, author and translator who worked in British India in the nineteenth century.

From 1857 Garthwaite served as the headmaster of various schools in India and later as deputy school inspector. From 1869 he became school inspector.

Garthwaite prepared several textbooks and collected and published petitions in Kannada and Malayalam for the Government. In 1884 Garthwaite was awarded a Fellowship by the University of Madras. He was awarded the British title Kaisar-i-Hind Medal.

After his retirement in 1888, Garthwaite worked with missionaries to make Braille compatible for thirteen Indian languages. In 1900, after several trips to South Australia, he moved there permanently to live in Norwood, South Australia.

Garthwaite died on 21 December 1918 in Glenelg, South Australia.
