= Church of England Zenana Missionary Society =

British Anglican missionary society

The Church of England Zenana Missionary Society (CEZMS; founded 1880), also known as the Church of England Zenana Mission, was a British Anglican missionary society established to spread Christianity in India via women. It would later expand its Christian missionary work into Japan and Qing Dynasty China. In 1957 it was absorbed into the Church Missionary Society (CMS).

== History ==
The society arose out of a split in the Zenana Bible and Medical Missionary Society who had denominational disputes. The Anglican church created the Church of England Zenana Missionary Society by the example of the Baptist Missionary Society, which had inaugurated zenana missions in India in the mid-19th century. Women in India at this time were segregated under the purdah system, being confined to a women's quarters known as a zenana into which it was forbidden for unrelated men to enter. The zenana missions were made up of female missionaries who could visit Indian women in their own homes with the aim of providing them with medical help and education.

The purdah system made it impossible for many Indian women, especially high status women, to access health care, and many were dying and suffering needlessly. By training as doctors and nurses, the women of the zenana missions were accepted by the women of India into their homes in a way that men would not have been. The zenana missions expanded from just home visits to open mobile clinics in rural areas, women only hospitals and all girl schools, all staffed and run by women both recruited in Britain and those recruited and trained locally in India.

The success of the Baptists in gaining local acceptance would lead to the creation of Anglican zenana missions in 1880, and the adoption of similar tactics in countries which practised segregation of men and women, the society became active in Qing dynasty China in 1884, Japan in 1886, and Sri Lanka (at that time known as Ceylon) in 1889. The work of the society was supported by the endowment of trusts by notable people of Victorian England. The society was also supported by the New Zealand Church Missionary Association, which was formed in 1892. Four members of the society were murdered in the Kucheng massacre on 1 August 1895.

Fujian was to be the main focus of society's expansion into China, with its first mission station being established outside the provincial capital of Fuzhou in 1884. Mission stations were added in Nantai in 1886, Kucheng in 1889, Luoyuan in 1893, Jian'ou, Pingnan and other sites in 1903, Songxi in 1907, and Pucheng in 1908. Hunan was the second Chinese province in which the society was active with, amongst others, mission centres being opened in Hengzhou in 1910 and Yongzhou in 1916. The third and last province in which the society opened a mission centre was Guangxi, with a centre being established in Guilin in 1916. In the Diocese of Fujian (Fokien) in 1908 there was a large staff of CEZMS workers.

In 1911, the society had a staff of 1288. In 1912, the churches founded by the society joined other Anglican churches in China to form the Chung Hua Sheng Kung Hui, the Anglican-episcopal church in China.

The activities of the society in India were wound up in the years following Indian independence and came to an end in China in 1950 shortly after the establishment of the People's Republic. In 1957, the Church of England Zenana Society was absorbed into the Church Mission Society, an organisation it had worked alongside for many years. A board of trustees existed until 1968 to transfer and administer the society's property and trust funds.

== Legacy ==
Some schools and hospitals established by the society still operate in India, some still bearing Zenana as part of their name.

== In popular culture ==
In E. M. Delafield's comic masterpieces, the "Diary of a Provincial Lady" series, "an Illustrated Paper 'reaches the hands of [her daughter], who says Oh, look at that picture of a naked lady, and screams with laughter. Ascertain later that this description, not wholly libellous, applies to full-page photograph of Pamela Pringle [a promiscuous socialite] - wearing enormous feathered headdress, jewelled breast-plates, one garter, and a short guaze skirt - representing Chasitity at recent Pageant of Virtue through the Ages organised by Society Women for the benefit of Zenana Mission."

== See also ==
- List of Protestant missionary societies in China (1807–1953)
- Timeline of Chinese history
- Protestant missions in China
- List of Protestant missionaries in China
- Christianity in China
- Blanche Brenton Carey
- Women's missionary societies
