= Liston House =

Former historic house in Delaware, US

- U.S. National Register of Historic Places
- Location within Delaware Location within the United States
- Location: Cedar Swamp Road, Taylors Bridge, Delaware
- Coordinates: 39°24′17″N 75°32′35″W
- Area: 1 acre (0.40 ha)
- Built: c. 1739
- NRHP reference No.: 73000546
- Added to NRHP: March 26, 1973

Liston House was a historic home located at Taylors Bridge in New Castle County, Delaware, United States. It was built about 1739, and was a two-story, three-bay brick dwelling with a gambrel roof. It had a 1 1/2-story, frame addition. The house had two end wall chimneys and shed roofed dormers.

It was listed on the National Register of Historic Places in 1973, and demolished before 1991.
