= Charles Younghusband =

British Army officer and meteorologist

Lieutenant-General Charles Younghusband CB FRS
- Born: Charles Wright Younghusband; 20 June 1821
- Died: 28 October 1899 (aged 78)

Lieutenant-General Charles Wright Younghusband CB FRS (20 June 1821 – 28 October 1899) was a British Army officer and meteorologist.

== Early life and education ==
He was the son of Major-General Charles Younghusband (1778–1843) and Frances Romer (1789–1843). His four brothers were also Army officers.

== Career ==
Like his father, he was an officer in the Royal Artillery. Aged 16, he was described as "probably the youngest and smallest officer in the service".

Aged 20, he was appointed acting superintendent of the Magnetic Observatory in Toronto, Canada, and acted as its director from 1841 to 1844.

He later served in the Crimea and became superintendent of the Royal Gun Factory.

== Selected publications ==
- "Magnetical and Meteorological Observations at Lake Athabasca and Fort Simpson", with John Henry Lefroy (1855)
- "Observations on Days of Unusual Magnetic Disturbance: Made at the British Colonial Magnetic Observatories, Under The Departments of the Ordnance And Admiralty", with Sir Edward Sabine

== Awards and honours ==
He was made a fellow of the Royal Society on 3 June 1852.

== Personal life ==
On 2 April 1825 at Brockville, Ontario, Canada, he married Mary Elizabeth Jones, daughter of Jonas Jones, judge and politician. His son, Commander Frank Campbell Younghusband (7 January 1851 – 16 May 1894) was an officer in the Royal Navy.

His nephew was the explorer Lieutenant-Colonel Sir Francis Younghusband.
