= The Song of the Women =

1888 poem by Rudyard Kipling

- by Rudyard Kipling
- First published in: The Pioneer
- Country: India
- Publication date: 1888

"The Song of the Women" is an 1888 poem by Indian-born English writer Rudyard Kipling, published in Indian newspaper The Pioneer on 17 April and shortly thereafter in other papers. It was written in support of Lady Dufferin’s Fund, which provided medical aid to Indian women denied access to male doctors.

It was originally published with a prose heading quoting from an address "of the women of Utterpara" to Lady Dufferin. In the poem, the women of India ponder about how to express their gratitude, asking the wind to send Lady Dufferin their blessings and thanks.

== Background ==
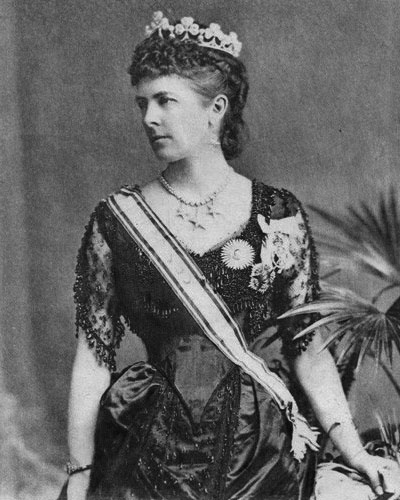
Lady Dufferin

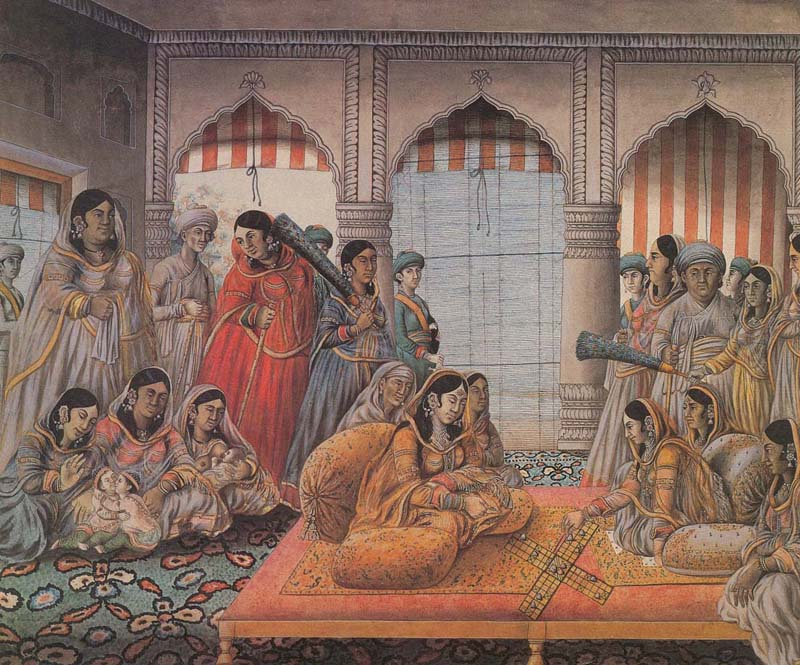
A zenana, in which women were secluded, in Lucknow

The latter half of the 19th century was an age of social reform for Indian women, with efforts made to address such issues as female illiteracy, purdah, female infanticide and child marriage. Around the 1860s, Western women such as Mary Carpenter and Annette Ackroyd took an active role in advancing female education in India.

Prior to the departure of Lady Dufferin from Britain in 1884 with her appointment as Vicereine of India, she was asked by Queen Victoria to investigate the possibilities of providing medical relief to Indian women, whose suffering the Queen was reported to be deeply concerned by. Lady Dufferin concluded that "taking India as a whole, its women were undoubtedly without that medical aid which their European sisters are accustomed to consider as absolutely necessary," with there being an "urgent need" for relief and "readiness for co-operation." She subsequently established her fund, also known as the National Association for supplying Female Medical Aid to the Women of India, to provide such aid. Her fund, or association, trained women medical staff to tend to women not permitted to see male doctors.

Hidden from the world, Indian women had no voice among either their indigenous countrymen or English men. Kipling privately sympathised with them, believing that “the Indian treatment of women” constituted “the main obstacle to closer relations between the natives and their rulers” and cited zenana, suttee, “infant marriage ... enforced widowhood” and prostitution which women were subjected to. Kipling greatly admired Lady Dufferin's advocacy for the rights of Indian women even as he objected to Lord Dufferin's support for the fledging Indian National Congress.

Kipling's later 1892 novel The Naulahka written with Wolcott Balestier likewise concerns the denial of health care to Indian women.

== Poem ==
How shall she know the worship we would do her?
The walls are high, and she is very far.
How shall the women’s message reach unto her
Above the tumult of the packed bazaar?
Free wind of March, against the lattice blowing,
Bear thou our thanks, lest she depart unknowing.

Go forth across the fields we may not roam in,
Go forth beyond the trees that rim the city,
To whatsoe’er fair place she hath her home in,
Who dowered us with wealth of love and pity.
Out of our shadow pass, and seek her singing—
“I have no gifts but Love alone for bringing.”

Say that we be a feeble folk who greet her,
But old in grief, and very wise in tears;
Say that we, being desolate, entreat her
That she forget us not in after years;
For we have seen the light, and it were grievous
To dim that dawning if our lady leave us.

By life that ebbed with none to staunch the failing
By Love’s sad harvest garnered in the spring,
When Love in ignorance wept unavailing
O’er young buds dead before their blossoming;
By all the grey owl watched, the pale moon viewed,
In past grim years, declare our gratitude!

By hands uplifted to the Gods that heard not,
By fits that found no favor in their sight,
By faces bent above the babe that stirred not,
By nameless horrors of the stifling night;
By ills foredone, by peace her toils discover,
Bid Earth be good beneath and Heaven above her!

If she have sent her servants in our pain
If she have fought with Death and dulled his sword;
If she have given back our sick again.
And to the breast the weakling lips restored,
Is it a little thing that she hath wrought?
Then Life and Death and Motherhood be nought.

Go forth, O wind, our message on thy wings,
And they shall hear thee pass and bid thee speed,
In reed-roofed hut, or white-walled home of kings,
Who have been holpen by her in their need.
All spring shall give thee fragrance, and the wheat
Shall be a tasselled floorcloth to thy feet.

Haste, for our hearts are with thee, take no rest!
Loud-voiced ambassador, from sea to sea
Proclaim the blessing, manifold, confessed.
Of those in darkness by her hand set free.
Then very softly to her presence move,
And whisper: “Lady, lo, they know and love!”

== See also ==
- Zenana missions
- Women's health in India
- Gender inequality in India
