= Mission Parivar Vikas =

Indian government family planning program

Mission Parivar Vikas (translated as "Family Development Mission") is a centrally sponsored family planning initiative launched by the Ministry of Health and Family Welfare (India) in 2017. The mission targets 146 high-fertility districts in seven Indian states with the objective of accelerating access to contraceptive and reproductive health services. It was formally introduced on 11 July 2017, coinciding with World Population Day, by the then Union Health Minister J. P. Nadda.

== Objective ==
Mission Parivar Vikas aims to reduce the total fertility rate in selected districts where it remains above 3.0. The mission seeks to achieve replacement-level fertility by the year 2025.

== Target Areas ==
The initiative covers 146 districts identified as high-priority in seven states, which include Uttar Pradesh, Bihar, Rajasthan, Madhya Pradesh, Chhattisgarh, Jharkhand, and Assam. These districts collectively account for a significant portion of India's population growth.

== See also ==
- Family planning in India
- National Health Mission
- Contraception in India
- HLL Lifecare
