= Caroline Starr Balestier Kipling =

Wife of Rudyard Kipling (1862–1939)

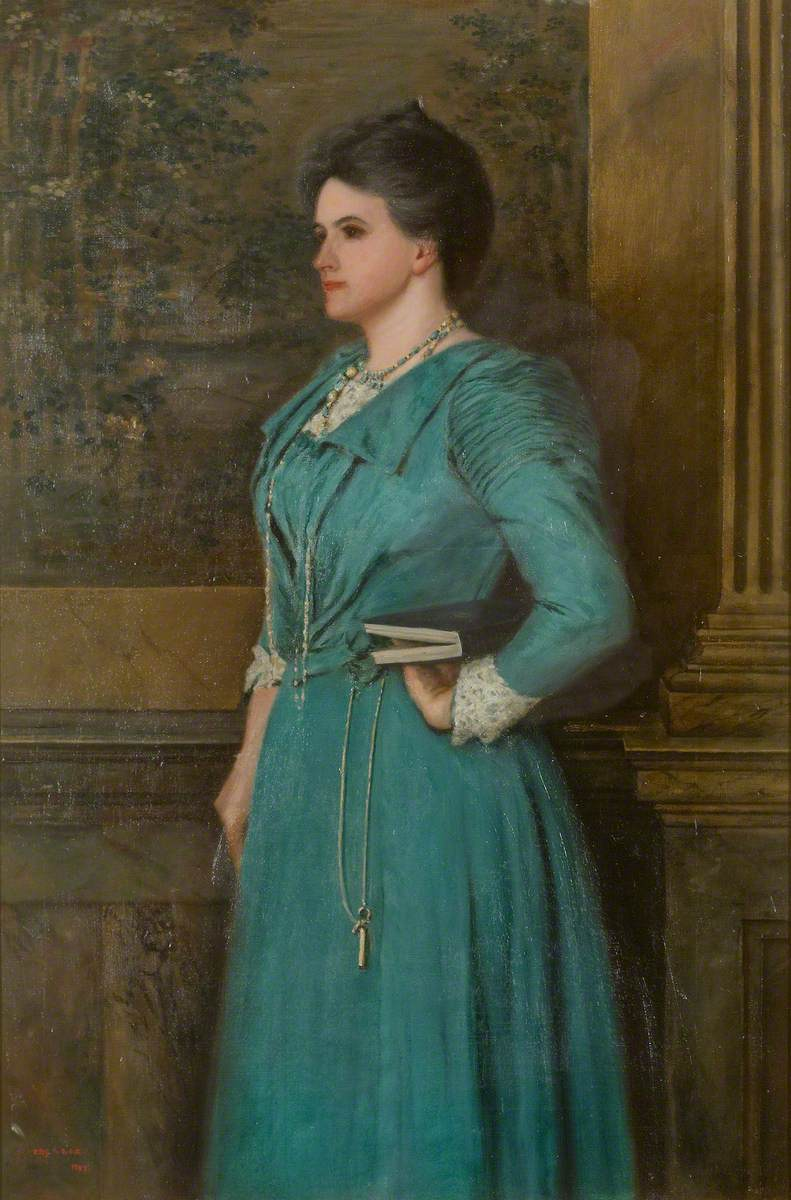
- Mrs. Kipling in 1899, painted by Edward Burne-Jones
- Born: Caroline Starr Balestier; December 31, 1862; Rochester, New York, U.S.
- Died: December 19, 1939 (aged 76); Burwash, East Sussex, England
- Spouse: Rudyard Kipling (m. 1892; died 1936)
- Children: Josephine; Elsie; John
- Relatives: Wolcott Balestier (brother)

Caroline Starr Balestier Kipling (December 31, 1862 – December 19, 1939), also known as Carrie, was the American-born wife of Rudyard Kipling and the custodian of his literary legacy after his death in 1936.

== Family ==
Balestier was born in Rochester, New York, to a prominent local family with a reputation for being unconventional. Her paternal grandfather, whose French ancestors were from Martinique, was a founder of the Century Association; her maternal grandfather was E. Peshine Smith, who with Commodore Perry completed commercial negotiations with Japan.

== Marriage ==
Balestier met Kipling via her brother Wolcott Balestier who had co-authored The Naulahka: A Story of West and East with Kipling. Balestier had come to London to keep house for her brother and serve as hostess for him. She taught Kipling how to use a typewriter. When Wolcott Balestier died suddenly of typhoid in 1891, Kipling was distraught and spent time with Miss Balestier, proposing to her via telegram and marrying her a week later. The couple were married in London on January 18, 1892. The bride was given away by Henry James who exclaimed "It’s a union of which I don’t forecast the future."

The Kiplings had planned a round-the-world trip for their honeymoon but Kipling's bank failed, causing them to relocate to Balestier's family residence in Brattleboro, Vermont. Once the Kiplings built the family house, Naulakha, Rudyard Kipling would write in an office that could only be accessed via Carrie Kipling's own office, where she would maintain his correspondence and manage the household accounts. The Kiplings left the United States in 1896 after Rudyard Kipling and Caroline's brother Beatty had an altercation over money.

The Kiplings eventually settled in England, in rural Burwash in the county of Sussex. They purchased Bateman's, a grand house that had been built in 1634. Bateman's was Carrie Kipling's home from 1902 until her death in 1939.
