= Harriette G. Brittan =

British-born American missionary

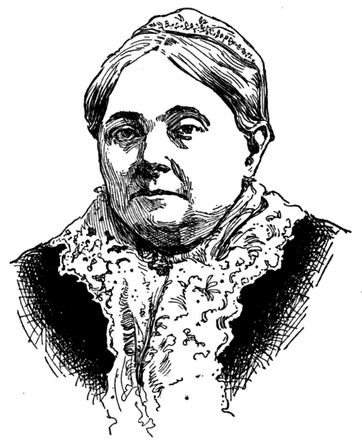
- Born: Harriette Gertrude Brittan; June 1822; England
- Died: April 30, 1897 (aged 74); San Francisco, California, U.S.
- Occupations: missionary; school founder; writer
- Writing career
- Language: English
- Subject: India

Harriette G. Brittan (June 1822 – April 30, 1897) was a pioneer British-born American missionary to Liberia, India and Japan. Finding herself unable to live in Africa because of repeated attacks of tropical fever, she was compelled to return to the United States. A year or two later, she went to India where she labored for twenty years. In 1880, she came to Japan and founded Brittan Girls’ School, later known as Yokohama Eiwa Gakuin. At the age of sixty-three, she gave up regular mission work and for a number of years, conducted a boarding house. When her health started to fail, she returned to the U.S. and died one day after reaching San Francisco.

Brittan was the author of, Statement of facts : [concerning the Woman's Union Missionary Society], Thomas Toomey; the history of an Irish boy, Kardoo, the Hindoo girl, Shoshie : the Hindoo Zenana teacher, A woman's talks about India, or, The domestic habits and customs of the people, and Scenes and incidents of every-day life in Africa.

== Early life and education ==
Harriette (sometimes spelled Harriet) Gertrude Brittan was born in England, June, 1822. In her early years, she removed with her parents to the United States, and settled in Brooklyn, where she obtained a good education. A terrible fall in childhood, from the third to the first floor, so injured her spine that, until she was eighteen, she could not leave her bed, except as she was carried. From that time, she gradually regained her health, but was never able to walk well.

Brittan did not gain a high school education, nor theological training. She affiliated with the Anglican Church her entire life.

== Career ==
Brittan might have lived in luxury at home, as she had a comfortable fortune in her own right. But the strength of conviction enabled her to go to Africa in spite of physical weakness. She was sent out by the Domestic and Foreign Missionary Society of the Protestant Episcopal Church to Liberia, but she could not live there, being constantly attacked by tropical fever, which compelled her return. It was a terrible trial to her to leave, the more so because she had promised to marry a missionary there. He could live in Africa, she could not. She endured the climate as long as she could, and was finally carried on board a sailing ship, with little expectation that she would live to reach home. The fact that the voyage proved to be just the thing needed to restore her was, probably, one reason for her eagerness to undertake the last voyage of her life. During the year or two of convalescence, she wrote a book on Africa, which she gave to the society that sent her out.

The Woman's Union Missionary Society, which organized in 1860, selected Brittan as one of its first missionaries to India. She went to Calcutta, and was one of the first American missionaries to enter the secluded homes of the women. She inaugurated and carried on this branch of work for twenty years. While in India, her feelings of sorrow for the Indian women found expression in a work called Kardoo, and a second called Shushone, which revealed how badly women were treated, and aroused the religious world to great efforts to send missionaries to their assistance.

She was an accomplished needlewoman, and by teaching her art she obtained entrance to many places not before accessible to foreigners. She went to India at a time when prejudices against woman's education and place in life were giving way. Her tact, spiritual insight, and judgment were all taxed to meet the new conditions, but she did it, and established a work that grew in great proportions. She was one of the first to perceive the enormous advantage possessed by women with a good medical training, and was a strong advocate of the education of female missionaries in the leading training schools for nurses or in the women's medical schools of the country. She wrote letter depicting life in India to the Christian at Work.

After her service in India, she returned for a year to the U.S., and for a time, was at the head of a ward in St. Luke's Hospital, in New York City. She was an indefatigable worker, and was the promoter of many concerts in New York and vicinity, by means of which thousands of dollars were gathered for missionary work.

After her resignation from the Union Missionary Society, Japan was the scene of her efforts —- her last as a missionary. Under the auspices of the Protestant Methodist Missionary Society she went to Yokohama in 1880, and took charge of a large mission established for the benefit of Eurasian children, who were often left in destitute circumstances. Until 1893, she was identified with this mission, and later, established and had charge of a home for missionaries.

== Later life and death ==
At the age of 63, she gave up regular mission work. In the meantime, business reverses had taken away her fortune and, having been very liberal, she found herself at this age with very limited means.

In the early spring of 1897, she disposed of her property in Yokohama and started for the U.S. She had been in poor health for several months, but hoped the sea air would build her up so that she could make the overland journey. She sailed from Japan April 13, but gradually grew weaker. When carried from the steamer to the carriage, she fainted. Upon arriving at the Occidental Hotel, in San Francisco, everything was done for her comfort, but she died the next day, on April 30, 1897. She had hoped to reach New York to see an adopted daughter, who was ill at St. Luke's Hospital. Knowing this would be impossible, she said, "Just as He wills; just as He wills." The funeral services were held at an Episcopal church in San Francisco, as she was a member of that body, and she was laid to rest in a cemetery there overlooking the Pacific Ocean.

Harriet Gertrude Brittan and Frederick Charles Klein, Methodist Protestant missionaries to Japan, was published in 1975, by John William Krummel.

== Selected works ==
- Statement of facts : [concerning the Woman's Union Missionary Society], 18--
- Thomas Toomey; the history of an Irish boy, 1861
- Kardoo, the Hindoo girl, 1869
- Shoshie : the Hindoo Zenana teacher, 1873
- A woman's talks about India, or, The domestic habits and customs of the people, 1880
- Scenes and incidents of every-day life in Africa
