= The Naulahka: A Story of West and East =

1892 novel by Rudyard Kipling in collaboration with Wolcott Balestier

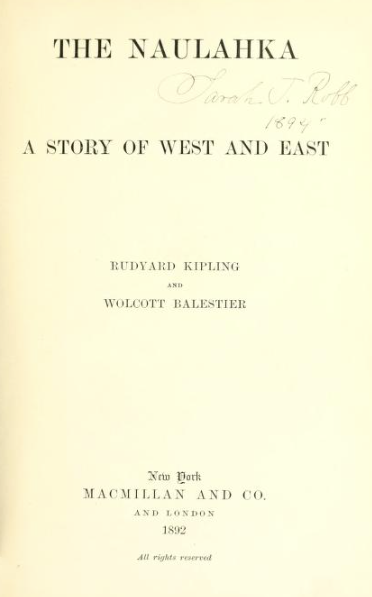
- Title page for The Naulahka: A Story of West and East (1892)
- Author: Rudyard Kipling; Wolcott Balestier
- Language: English
- Genre: Fiction
- Published: 1892
- Publication place: UK
- Pages: 352

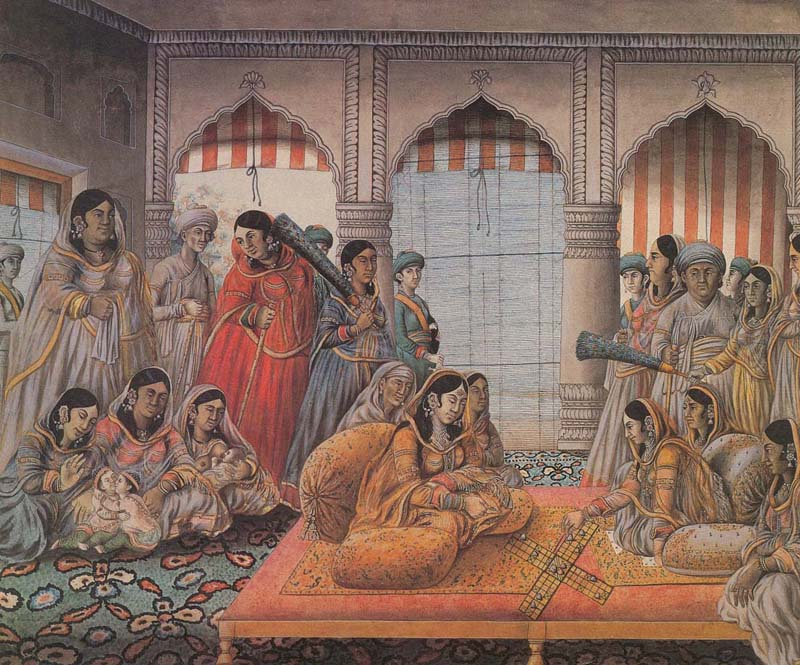
A zenana, in which women were secluded, in Lucknow

The Naulahka: A Story of West and East is an 1892 novel by Rudyard Kipling in collaboration with Wolcott Balestier, which was originally serialised in The Century Magazine from November 1891 to July 1892. It centres on two Americans who travel to India for different purposes: Kate Sheriff, a feminist whose goal is to aid oppressed Indian women denied access to health care, and Nick Tarvin, an entrepreneur who wants a valuable Indian necklace in order to influence the construction of a railway. The book is set in the fictional state of Rahore, believed to be based on Rajputana.

== Background ==
The latter half of the 19th century was an age of social reform for Indian women, with efforts made to address such issues as female illiteracy, purdah, female infanticide and child marriage. Around the 1860s, Western women such as Mary Carpenter and Annette Ackroyd took an active role in advancing female education in India. From the 1880s, medical missionaries brought relief to Indian women inside the zenanas in which they were secluded.

Hidden from the world, Indian women had no voice among either their indigenous countrymen or English men. Kipling privately sympathised with them, believing that "the Indian treatment of women" constituted "the main obstacle to closer relations between the natives and their rulers" and cited zenana, suttee, "infant marriage ... enforced widowhood" and prostitution which women were subjected to. He wrote a poem, The Song of the Women, in support of Lady Dufferin’s Fund, which provided medical aid to Indian women denied access to male doctors.

== Plot summary ==
Kate Sheriff – a young, androgynous American feminist – travels to India to become a sort of secular medical missionary, aiming to alleviate the suffering of Indian women. She succeeds at bringing medical relief to and earning the trust and affection of individual women, but broadly fails due to the resistance of Indian men. Sheriff is told by a local American woman missionary that she is "working against thousands of years of tradition and training and habits of life" and that these forces are certain to ultimately defeat her.

At the same time, Nick Tarvin, a scheming entrepreneur from the American West, makes designs to influence the construction of a railway line, for which purpose a valuable necklace by which the book is named is imperative. The two were engaged, but after Tarvin frustrates Sheriff's humanitarian efforts she terminates the relationship. Tarvin secures but then returns the necklace to save Sheriff from danger, and the two return to America. Sheriff, having previously questioned the value of marriage and shown little interest in it, commits to marrying Tarvin.

== Critical reception ==
By 1910, The Naulahka had sold 20,000 copies in Britain. The novel received an unenthusiastic critical reception; Lord Birkenhead thought ill of Balestier's effect on Kipling's writing:

An alien hand lay heavy on him, and reading the dry, stilted chapters contributed by Balestier about life in the Middle West one is again astonished by the spell that this man exercised.

J. M. S. Tompkins was also critical, opining that "it is impossible to think that much effort went into this book." However, not all responses were negative. Authorised Kipling biographer Charles Carrington praised elements of the book:

… anything in which Kipling had a hand is readable; here and there it is enlivened by piercing observations and forcible expressions such as no one but Kipling could have penned…

Academic Indrani Sen, in Social Scientist, writes that the protagonist, Kate Sheriff:

...is an embodiment of the New Woman of the 1890s who questions the meaning of marriage, and also wishes to play the role of a secular medical missionary, ameliorating the sufferings of her 'sisters' in India. In many ways, Kate's situation exemplifies the contradictions of the 'feminist imperialist', as inspired by "Pundita Ramabai's account of the sad case of her sisters at home" this 'maternal imperialist' goes out to India, armed with western medicine to work among the women.

== See also ==
- Zenana missions
- Women's health in India
- Gender inequality in India
