= Kardoo, the Hindoo Girl =

1869 book by Harriette G. Brittan

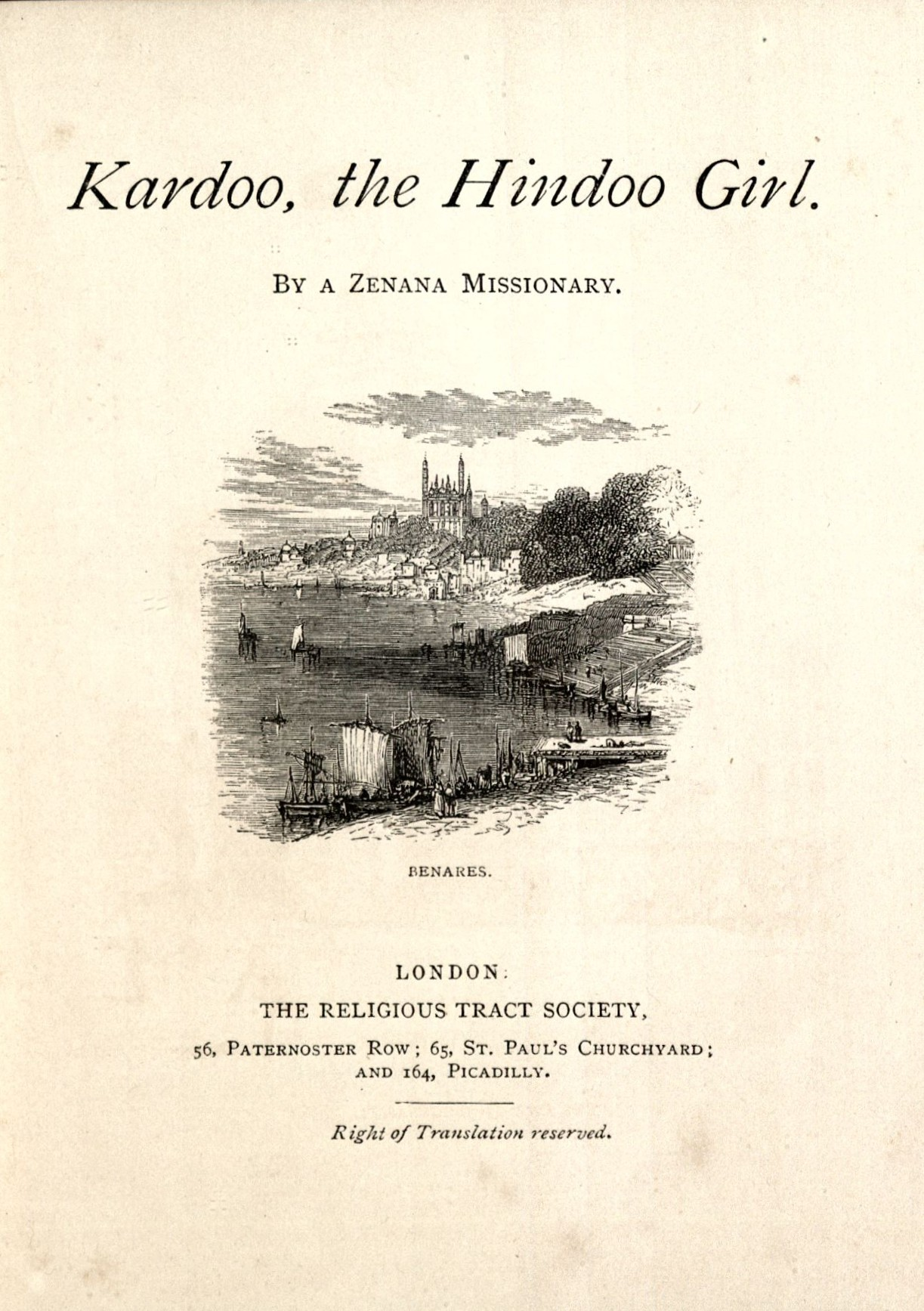
- Author: Harriette G. Brittan
- Genre: Christian mission
- Publication date: 1869
- Publication place: United States + United Kingdom

Kardoo, the Hindoo Girl is a book written by Harriette G. Brittan in the year 1869. It was published by W. B. Bodge of New York and later anonymously by the Religious Tract Society as part of the Zenana Missionary Series. The book narrates the story of Kardoo, a young Hindu girl from Bengal who, after a series of personal tragedies, is rescued by Christian missionaries and converts to Christianity. The book is notable as an early example of Western missionary fiction aimed at young Christian readers, illustrating the intersection of colonial ideology, gendered narratives, and religious education in 19th-century literature. After analyzing it in modern times, some people have concluded the book to be "propaganda" and "dedicated to expose the failures of Hinduism, to emphasize its contribution to a brutal way of life and to posit Christianity as an alternative and a superior way of living".

== Context ==
The book was written in the mid-19th century, when India was under direct British colonial rule. During this period, many British and American Christian missionaries viewed Hindu society as deeply "backward". Protestant accounts routinely denounced Hindu customs like child marriage and the practice of sati (widow-burning) as “superstitious" and "barbaric". Nineteenth-century tracts and periodicals often depicted a Hindu widow’s self-immolation as signifying a “benighted” society trapped in superstition.

The author of the book, Harriette G. Brittan (1822–1897) experienced a crippling childhood injury and was consequently bedridden until age 18. Overcoming chronic weakness, she felt called to missionary service and volunteered for Africa through the Episcopal Church where she wrote the book, Scenes and incidents of every-day life in Africa. After battling tropical fever in Liberia and enduring the emotional trial of failing to fulfill missionary vows, she returned home to recover. Once restored, she accepted the Woman’s Union Missionary Society’s call in 1860 to serve in India. In her Statement of Facts concerning the Woman’s Union Missionary Society, Brittan explained that despite earlier setbacks she felt she had “devoted [herself] to God for this work” and remained determined to pursue missionary service. She went on to explain that traditional mission boards often refused to send women, either doubting their suitability or lacking resources. But Brittan stressed that cultural customs in India prevented male missionaries from reaching women in seclusion, and argued that female missionaries had a unique responsibility to reach these “perishing sisters” through teaching and care. Brittan describes her initial experiences in Calcutta, highlighting the challenges and opportunities she encountered in engaging with local women and children. To gain access to secluded zenana quarters, she taught needle work which allowed her to reach Hindu women while promoting education and Christianity. These experiences formed the emotional and cultural foundation for Kardoo, the Hindoo Girl and its themes of Indian women’s suffering and redemption.

== Summary of the Book ==
The book is structured in chapters and written from the first-person perspective of Kardoo, a young Hindu girl from Bengal. In the early chapters, Kardoo recounts her childhood in an upper-middle-class, orthodox Bengali household. She is the daughter of her father's second wife and grows up in a bungalow surrounded by the strict customs and beliefs of a traditional Hindu family. Her narrative offers detailed descriptions of family life, gender roles, and religious practices, with a particular focus on the seclusion and domestic expectations placed on women. Kardoo also describes various Hindu festivals and rituals observed in the household.

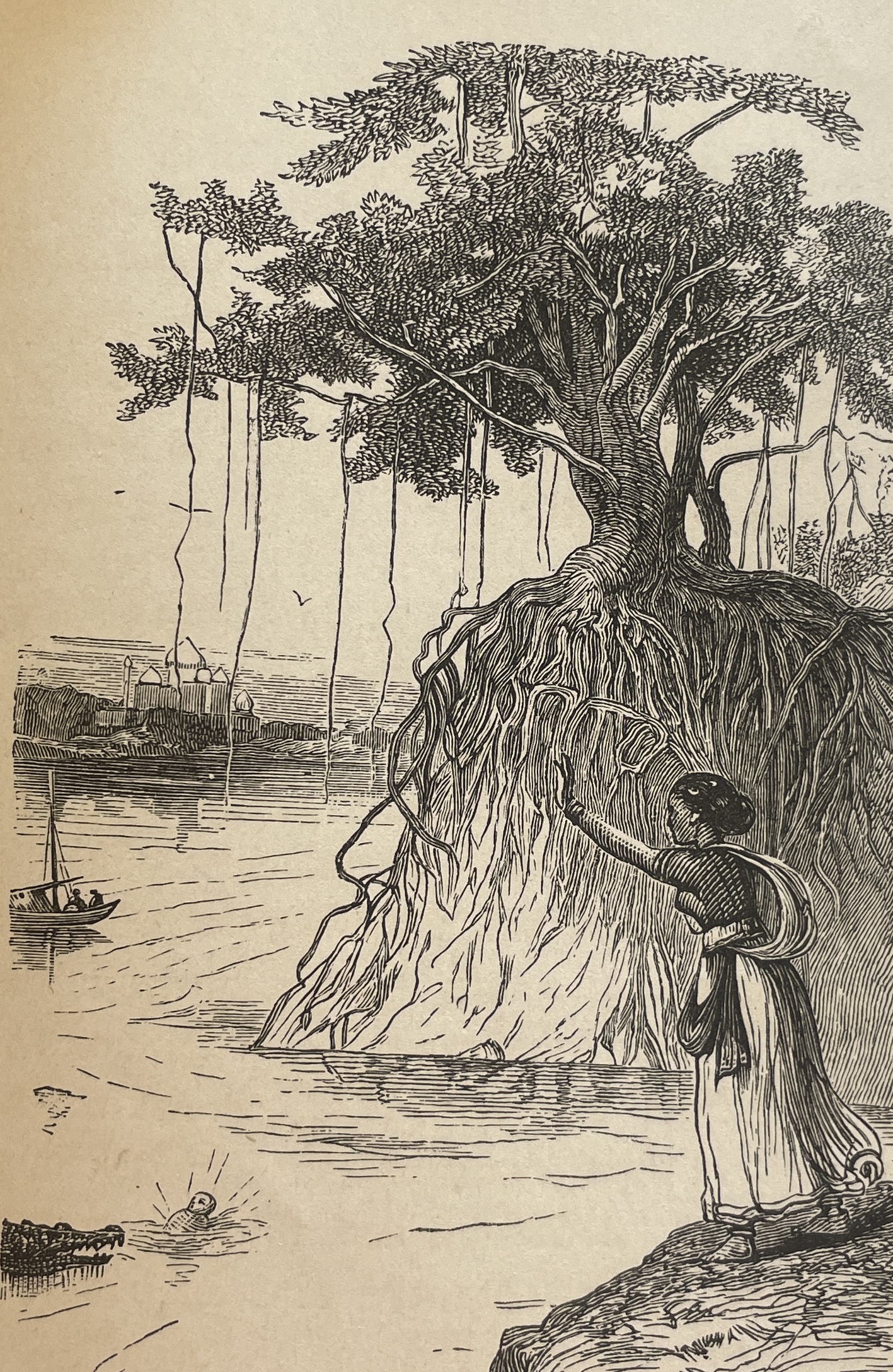
Kardoo's mother forced to sacrifice her son to alligators

As the story progresses, Kardoo begins to question her religious beliefs, influenced by her uncle Chandru. Chandru is portrayed as a progressive figure who expresses interest in Christianity. Alarmed by his views, the family sends him to Holy Benaras (now, Varnasi) to reaffirm his Hindu faith. There, he is killed by a group of thugs. His child bride, who is also Kardoo’s close friend, is then forced into strict traditional customs of widowhood and ultimately dies of starvation.

Kardoo is later married to an older Brahmin man whose first wife had failed to produce a male heir. According to custom, Kardoo remains in her natal home after the marriage. The story continues with a series of personal tragedies. These include the death of her infant brother, who is sacrificed following the instructions of a family priest. Her mother, is eventually tricked and dishonoured by a group of men seeking revenge on Kardoo’s father. As a result, she is beaten to death by her husband in the name of preserving religious honour.

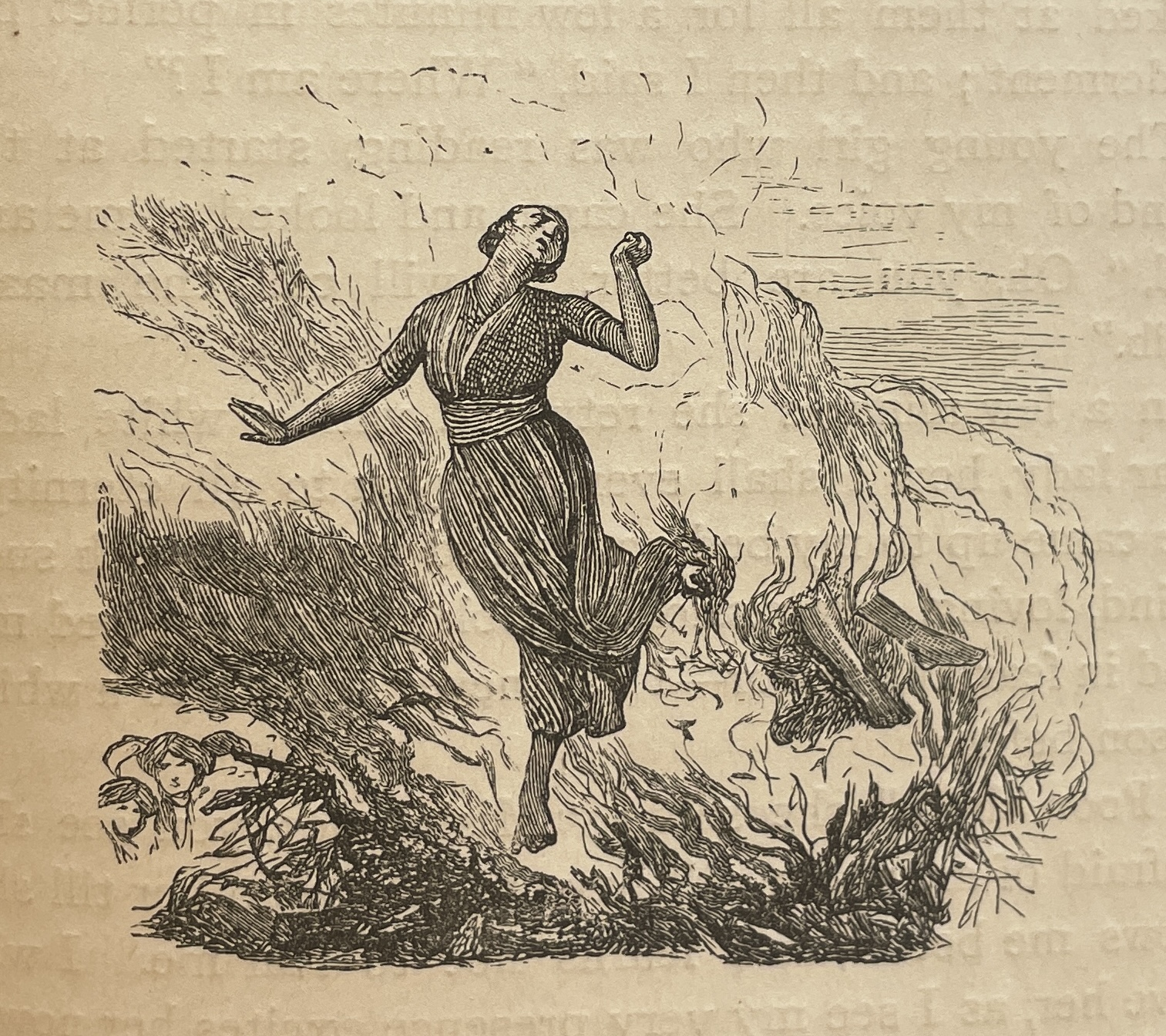
Kardoo is forced to burn at her husband's funeral pyre

The final tragedy occurs when Kardoo's husband dies. Her father insists she perform sati, a ritual wherein a widow self-immolates on her husband's funeral pyre. Kardoo is rescued by Christian missionaries and taken to their mission home, where she eventually converts to Christianity.

In the concluding chapters, Kardoo’s father, now physically injured and remorseful, is brought to the mission after being run over by a chariot. Initially hostile towards his daughter, he eventually expresses his regret and dies. The narrative ends with Kardoo fully embracing Christianity and the missionary life.

== Publication history ==
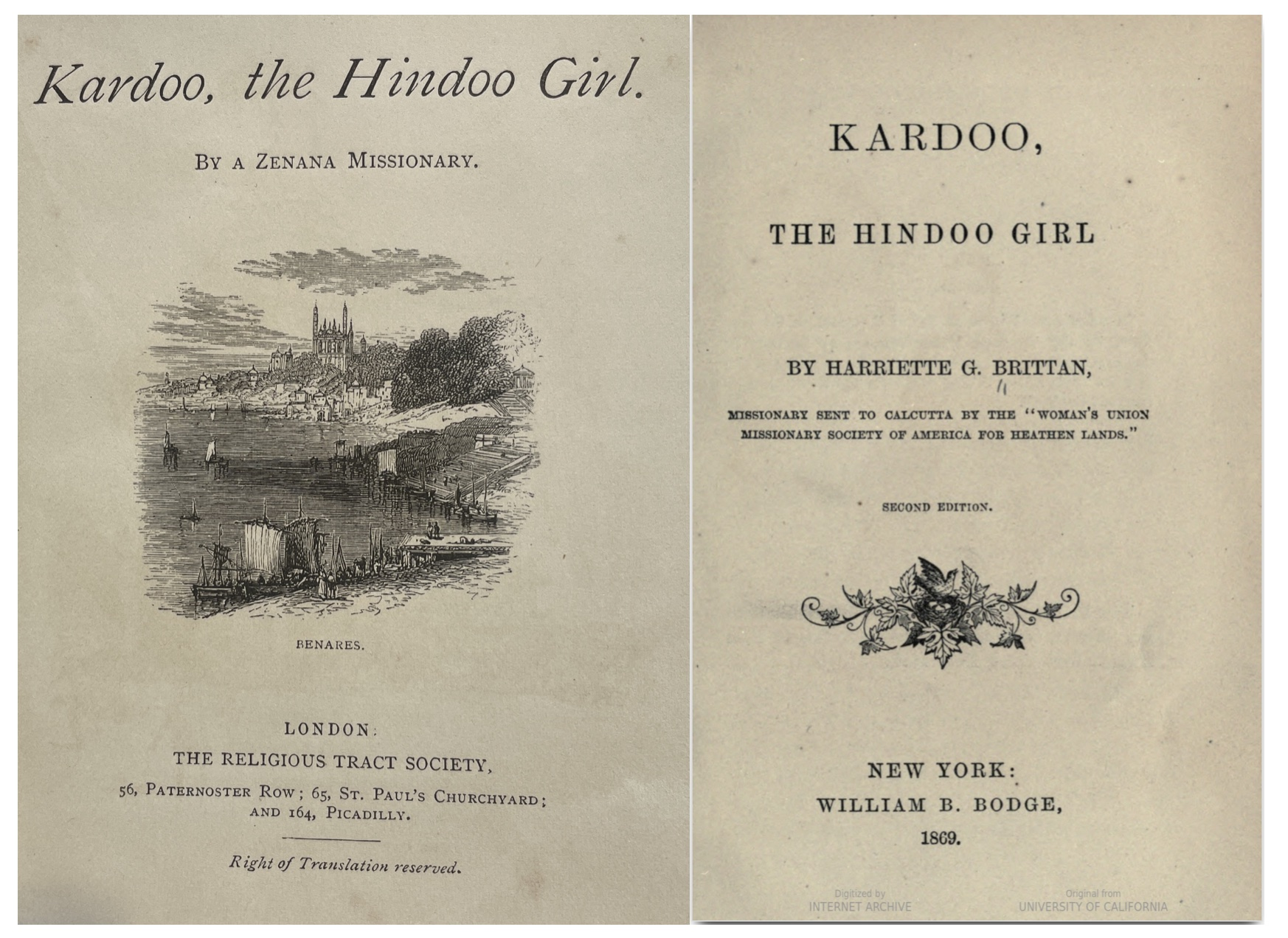
Left: Title page of the British edition, published anonymously; Right: Title page of the American edition, naming Harriette G. Brittan

Kardoo, the Hindoo Girl first appeared in North America in an edition published by W. B. Bodge of New York in 1869 naming Harriette G. Brittan as the author. Library records list this as a “2d edition”, indicating that there was more than one edition of this book. Another version of this book was published anonymously in London by the Religious Tract Society, as part of its Zenana Missionary Series, although the exact publication date and year is unclear. The Society often omitted the names of its authors, emphasizing the religious message over individual recognition.

The American version and the British version had differing prefaces.The American preface, written as a letter from Brittan herself to her readers, emphasized that the book was an “impression of India” and urged Western audiences to be grateful that they were born into the “civilized” religion of Christianity. The anonymous British preface framed the story as evidence of the “civilizing” impact of Christianity in India and as a call to support missionary activity.

Both editions were aimed at Western Christian readers, particularly women and children, and were circulated through missionary societies, Sunday schools, and church reading circles. Their purpose was to raise awareness of Indian women’s supposed suffering under Hindu customs and to encourage financial and moral support for missionary efforts in India.

== Reception ==
In the preface of Kardoo, the Hindoo Girl, Brittan dedicated the novel to the mission bands of the Woman’s Union Missionary Society, aiming to inspire young readers to support efforts on behalf of Indian Zenana women. In the first chapter of her later book Shoshie, the Zenana Teacher (1873), she noted that readers had shown great interest in Kardoo and that the book had deepened their commitment to missionary work among Indian women. Through works like Kardoo and Shoshie, Brittan not only contributed to the Zenana Missionary movement but also shaped Western perceptions of Indian women. Her books helped understanding missionary literature and colonial attitudes toward gender and religion.

Brittan's work was positively received by Missionary publications of the period. An 1873 advertisement for Shoshie described the author as the “Author of ‘Kardoo’” and praised her for her efforts in offering Western readers “glimpses of the interior of heathenism” in India. The Register and St. Chrysostom’s Magazine referred to Brittan as an “able missionary,” and described her stories of Indian domestic life as both entertaining and informative. The journal Home and Abroad praised her works as “a very interesting work, showing the patient labor of those who are trying to spread the religion of Jesus in the dark places of the earth.” After Kardoo and Shoshie, Brittan authored the book A woman's talks about India, or, The domestic habits and customs of the people in 1880. After India, Brittan continued her missionary work in Japan where she founded Brittan Girls’ School, later known as Yokohama Eiwa Gakuin.

== Modern Views ==
Over time, scholars have analyzed Kardoo within the context of missionary fiction, exploring both its ideological content and narrative strategies to spread propaganda. Among these scholars, Karen Sánchez-Eppler and Sukla Chatterjee have provided significant insights into the book’s depiction of Indian domestic life and its intended audience.

Karen Sánchez-Eppler, in her 1996 article, argues that episodes such as the sacrifice of Kardoo’s infant brother are used to portray Hindu domestic life as tragic and chaotic. She observes that Brittan employs tropes such as “heathen maternal depravity” to dramatize religious violence within the Hindu family, in contrast to the peace and moral order associated with Christian domesticity. According to Sánchez-Eppler, this contrast was particularly aimed at American child readers and Sunday school students.

Sukla Chatterjee argues that Brittan’s use of a first-person voice creates the illusion of an authentic Hindu autobiography, even though the narrative was written by a Western missionary. This literary strategy, according to Chatterjee, was meant to engage readers’ sympathy and enhance the book’s credibility and spread the propaganda of the "superiority" of Christianity. The fictional “voice” of Kardoo ultimately reinforces Christian ideals by depicting the girl’s journey away from “heathen” practices and toward Christian salvation.

As a missionary text, it is dedicated to expose the failures of Hinduism, to emphasize its contribution to a brutal way of life and to posit Christianity as an alternative and a superior way of living. The plot is a continuous drift from one mishap to another in the life of the young Hindu girl with religion and culture playing a major role. The imagination and selfsituating of the author as the protagonist from a different religious and cultural background makes the narrative interesting by exposing a split in it.

— Sukla Chatterjee, Gazing across the Divide in the Days of the Raj: The Imperial and the Colonized Women’s Viewing of the ‘Other’, pg. 14
