= Occidental Hotel =

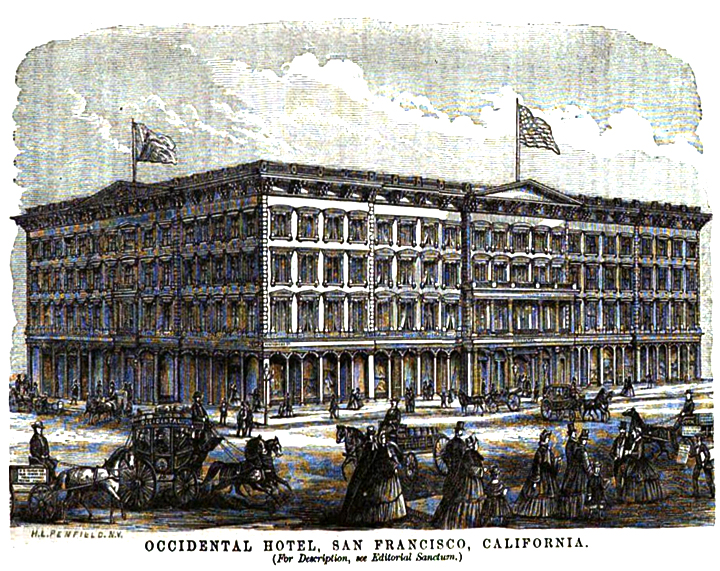
- Interactive map of the Occidental Hotel area

General information
- Type: Hotel and restaurant
- Architectural style: Italianate
- Location: Montgomery Street between Bush and Sutter, San Francisco, California, United States
- Coordinates: 37.790546°N 122.402188°W
- Opened: 1861
- Closed: April 18, 1906

Design and construction
- Architects: Caleb Hyatt, Thomas Johnston, William Mooser

The Occidental Hotel opened in 1861 in San Francisco, California. It was destroyed in the San Francisco earthquake and subsequent fire of 1906. It was one of the many hotels named Occidental in the United States, and it was among the few luxury hotels in San Francisco that catered to wealthy travelers. Operating in the years that roughly coincided with the end of the California Gold Rush and the beginning of silver mining in Nevada, the Occidental Hotel was among the new, grand hotels in San Francisco. In the exclusive hotel market, along with the Occidental were the Lick House, the Russ House, the Cosmopolitan, the Grand, the Palace, and the Baldwin.

== Construction ==
Construction of the hotel occurred in three stages between 1861 and 1869, and it opened upon completion of the first section on the southeast corner of Montgomery and Bush Streets, under the direction of architect Caleb Hyatt. Hyatt designed an Italianate, four-story building, and the style was preserved by subsequent architects. Along with the nearby Masonic Hall, the Occidental towered above all other buildings in its vicinity and was visible from outside the city. Its accommodations were elegant and spacious.

The second phase of construction was directed by architect Thomas Johnston, and the third phase by architect William Mooser.

During an investigation into the construction of the former San Francisco City Hall in the early 1870s, Johnston testified that the Occidental was constructed with foundation rocks quarried from Angel Island, built with wood floors and joists, and reinforced with iron bands used for structural stabilization. Another architect, Stephen H. Williams, estimated the construction costs of the hotel to be between sixteen and eighteen cents per square foot.

== Hotel ==
=== Description ===
Theatrical agent and author Edward Peron Hingston described the hotel in 1863,

An air of sumptuous splendor and easeful comfort strikes us immediately as we enter the doors, as being characteristics of the house. Newly built, only a portion of the intended edifice completed, and the grand staircase not yet opened, the Occidental is but an incomplete sample of that which it is intended to be. The interior fittings are those of a first-class hotel; the bedrooms are airy, the beds soft and large; the salle-a-manger is a spacious hall, with elaborate embellishments and columns of noble proportions. There are breakfast rooms and supper rooms, hot and cold baths for everybody, well-carpeted stairs, elegant drawing rooms for the use of the ladies, pianos of the best manufacture, and lounges and rocking chairs of the most luxurious construction. The attendance is far better than in most English hotels, with none of that bowing and scraping servility among the waiters which constitutes the most offensive form of attention. Our two dollars and a half per day includes attendance.

Hotel service included vases of flowers and platters of fruit delivered to guestrooms when a new guest arrived.

=== Guests ===
Some of the guests who stayed at the hotel included Robert Louis Stevenson, Lillie Hitchcock Coit, and Mark Twain. In his notebook from February, 1865, Twain wrote, "26th – Home again – home again at the Occidental Hotel." Ralph Waldo Emerson stayed at the hotel while on the lecture circuit. The hotel attracted authors and intellectuals at least partly because The Golden Era, a weekly literary magazine, was headquartered there. Joaquin Miller described the magazine's offices as gaudily carpeted and gorgeously furnished. Union Army general Henry Morris Naglee died at the hotel in 1886 and British-born American missionary, Harriet G. Brittan, died at the hotel in 1897.

=== Restaurant and bar ===
The restaurant and bar at the hotel were among San Francisco's informal meeting venues for political and business discussions. Bartender Jerry Thomas claimed to have invented the Martini at the Occidental, although other origins have been suggested. Developing drinks there, in other major cities, and in four saloons he operated in New York City in the late 19th century, Thomas is considered the "father of American mixology." In 1863 he was earning $100 per week at the Occidental, higher pay than the vice-president of the United States.

== Earthquake and fire ==
The day of the San Francisco earthquake, Henry Pittock, publisher of The Oregonian, was a guest in the hotel. Although not injured by falling debris, Pittock said that his suitcase was "flattened like a pancake." Journalist Ashton Stevens was also a guest, and he wrote, "When the ceiling came down on the top floor of the Occidental Hotel we fled with barely enough clothes for panic modesty." Author Gertrude Atherton had stored some of her belongings at the hotel, and when she arrived to claim them after the earthquake, all she could find were 40,000 words of the yet unpublished manuscript, Ancestors.

The hotel was damaged in the earthquake, and it was immediately evacuated. The ensuing fire that destroyed much of San Francisco also claimed the Occidental, and the remaining structure soon was demolished. Salvage estimators valued the earthquake-damaged hotel before the fire at $285,000 and after the fire at $15,000, a loss of $270,000. By comparison, the property had been appraised eleven years earlier upon the death of owner Joseph Donohoe whose half interest in the hotel amounted to $481,250, making the total value of the hotel in 1895 worth almost a million dollars. Using the pre-earthquake figure, the loss was about $950,000.

== Additional notoriety ==
In 1870, Laura Fair stayed at the Occidental Hotel with the Crittenden family prior to murdering Alexander Crittenden.

The Occidental Cigar Club in San Francisco's Financial District takes its name from the Occidental Hotel.

== See also ==
- History of San Francisco
- Hotel

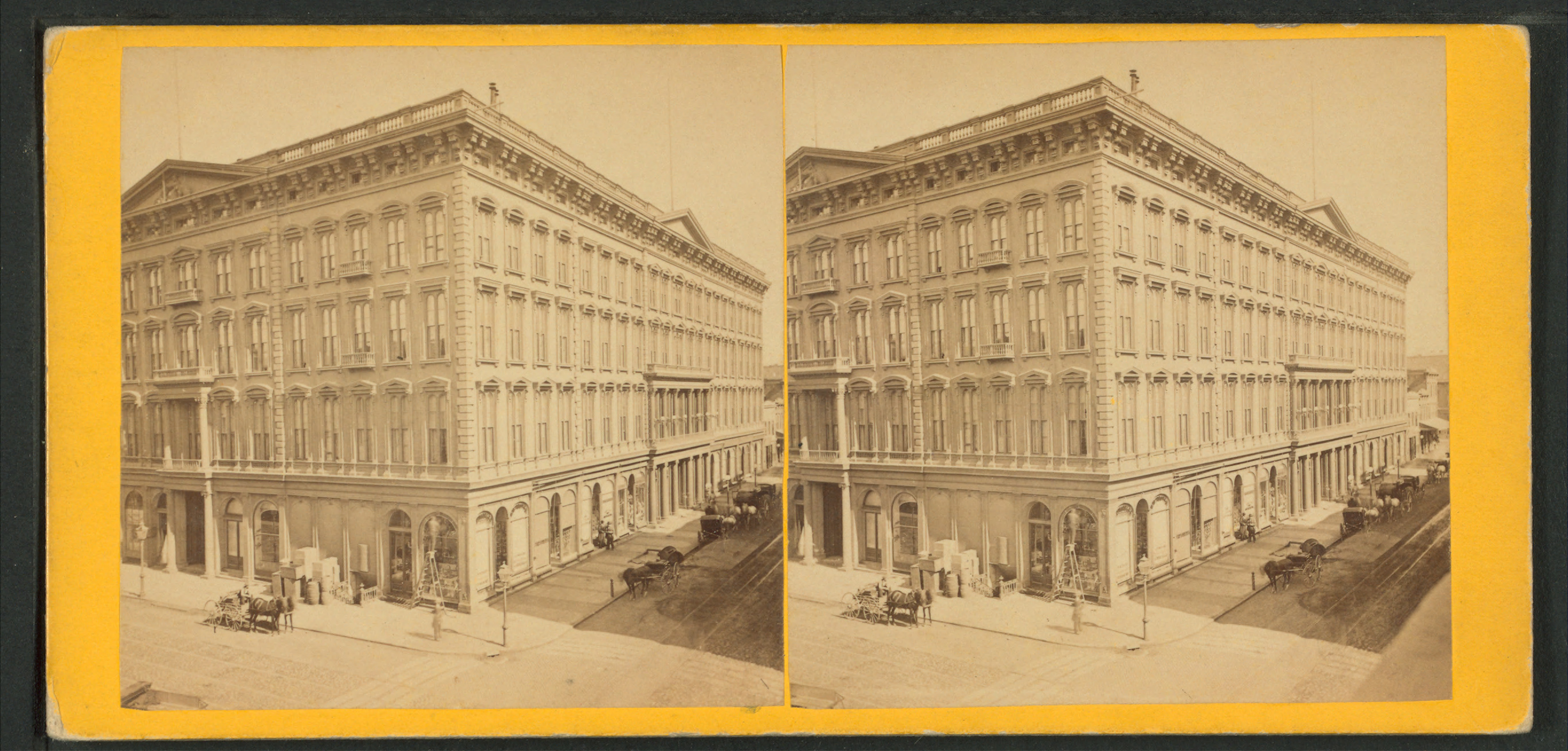
Occidental House, from the Robert N. Dennis collection of stereoscopic views
