= Zenana missions =

Christian missions in British India

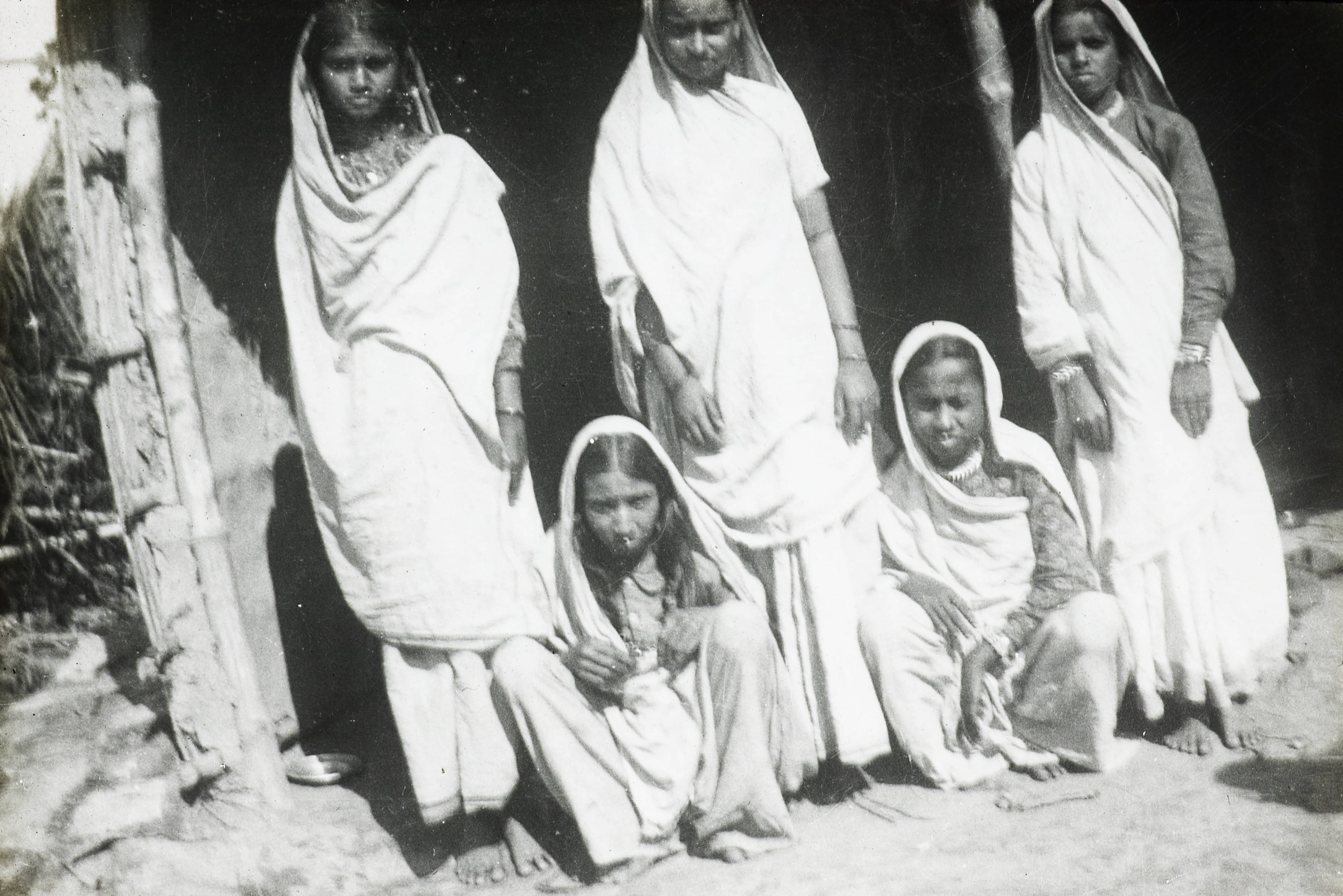
High caste women, Harkua, India, c. 1915

The zenana missions were outreach programmes established in British India with the aim of converting women to Christianity. From the mid 19th century, they sent female missionaries into the homes of Indian women, including the private areas of houses - known as zenana - that male visitors were not allowed to see. Gradually these missions expanded from purely evangelical work to providing medical and education services. Hospitals and schools established by these missions are still active, making the zenana missions an important part of the history of Christianity in India.

== Background ==
Women in India at this time were segregated under the purdah system, being confined to women's quarters known as a zenana, which men unrelated to them were forbidden to enter. The zenana missions were made up of female missionaries who could visit Indian women in their own homes with the aim of converting them to Christianity.

The purdah system made it impossible for many Indian women, especially high status women, to access health care, and many were needlessly dying and suffering. By training as doctors and nurses, the women of the zenana missions could be accepted by the women of India in a way that men would not have been.

== History ==
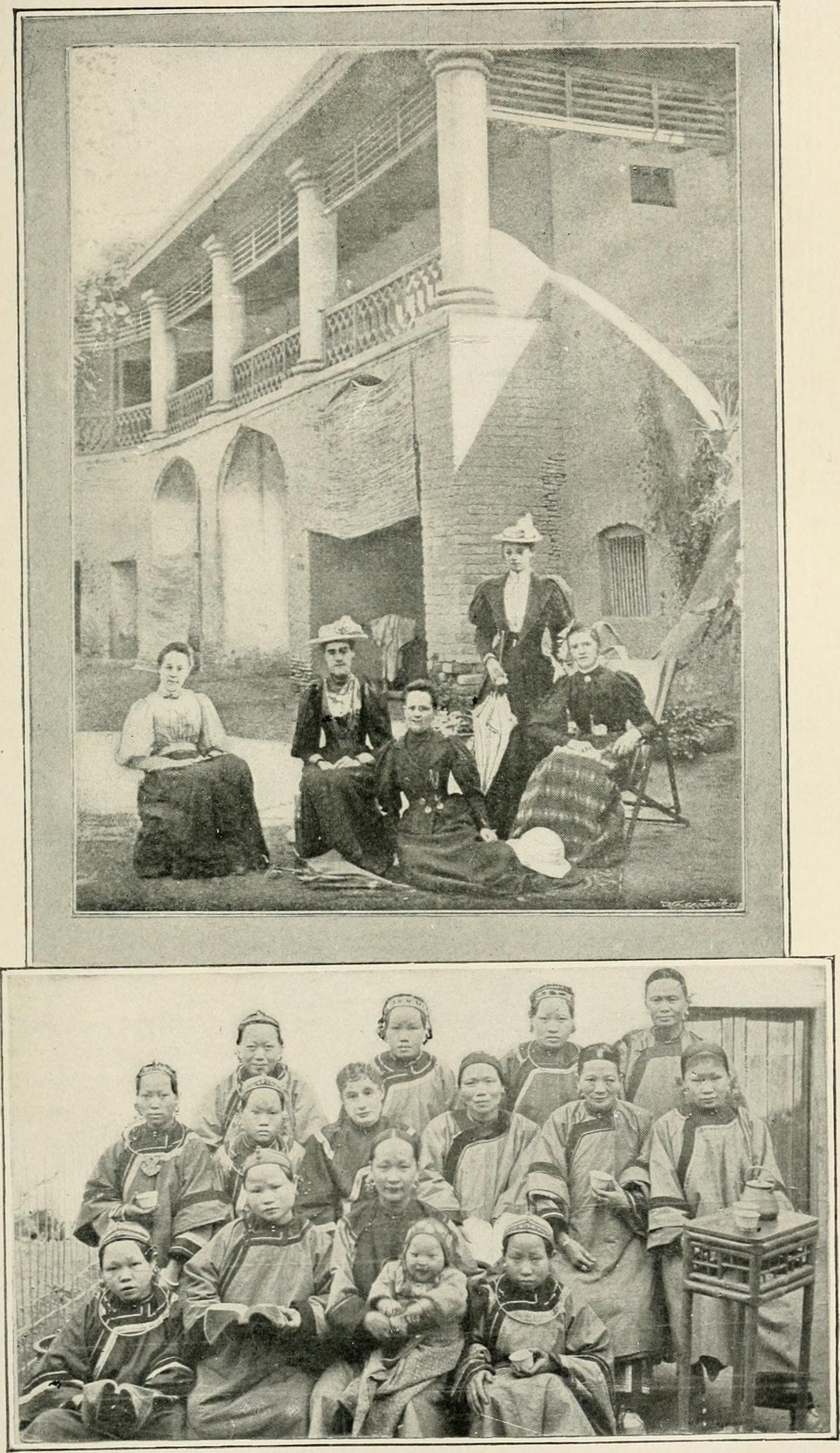
Lady missionaries in the court of the Zenana Mission House, Peshawar (above); The station class at Sa-yong, Fuhkien, China (below)

The Baptist Missionary Society inaugurated zenana missions in India in the mid 19th century. The first zenana mission resulted from a proposal by Thomas Smith in 1840, with the mission beginning in 1854, under the supervision of John Fordyce. Hana Catherine Mullens is known as one of the most efficient zenana workers in India, and won the title of "the Apostle of the Zenanas." In 1856, Mrs. Mullens set up a small school at Bhawanipur, with twenty three students aged between eight and twenty. The Calcutta Normal school was established in the same year, to train native women for zenana work.

By the 1880s, the zenana missions had expanded their ministry, opening schools to provide education for girls, including the principles of the Christian faith. This programme also included home visits, the establishment of women's hospitals and the opening of segregated women's wards in general hospitals. One society, the Zenana Bible and Medical Mission, was involved in recruiting female doctors, both by persuading female doctors in Europe to come to India and by encouraging Indian women to study medicine in their pursuit of conversion. As a result, the Zenana missions helped break down the male bias against colonial medicine in India to a small extent.

In the 1930s, the Zenana missions expanded further into healthcare. The Elizabeth Newman Hospital was opened by Beatrice Marian Smyth. This sixty bed hospital assisted with blood transfusions, child births, and anaemia cases among men, women, children, and people from all over Kashmir, India.

The work of the Baptists inspired the formation of a British Anglican missionary society, the Church of England Zenana Missionary Society (founded 1880), which was involved in sending missionaries to mission stations in countries such as India (19th and 20th centuries) and late Qing dynasty China, beginning in 1884. Zenana missionaries had their establishments at Trivandrum, Palamcotta (Sarah Tucker College), Masulipatnam and Madras in South India, and Meerut, Jabalpur, Calcutta and Amritsar in North India.

== Bible women in India ==
Educated Indian Christian women, who worked as assistants to the zenana missionaries were known as Bible women. They came from notable families and worked among poor women in villages, towns, hospitals, schools, etc. The Bible women, helped bridge the vast cultural differences between the English missionaries and the village folk. The Bible women used indigenous ideas to teach and preach their ideals of a Christian God to the women of the subcontinent. They used music to reach out to its wide audience - to attract more women and to provide a commentary on the verses from Bible. Bible women wore white saris and carried cloth covered Bibles, representative of their virtuous identity. They stopped wearing jewellery and deprived themselves of all forms of vanity. Bible women took up various roles in the zenana missions. They taught in girls' schools, which were attended by all classes. Bible women visited the zenana, taught women and girls there, preached religious values and worked for the general good of the women. They also visited native women in hospitals and homes, providing healthcare services and facilities.

== See also ==
- Lady Dufferin, Vicereine of India
- The Naulahka: A Story of West and East, a book by Rudyard Kipling
- The Song of the Women, a poem by Kipling
- Kardoo, the Hindoo Girl, a book published as part of the Zenana Missionary Series
