= Wolcott Balestier =

American novelist (1861–1891)

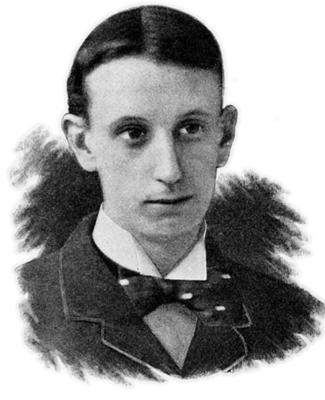
- Wolcott Balestier, from a photograph by G.C. Cox, 1880s-1891.
- Born: Charles Wolcott Balestier; December 13, 1861; Rochester, New York, U.S.
- Died: December 6, 1891 (aged 29); Dresden
- Relatives: Caroline Starr Balestier (sister)

Charles Wolcott Balestier (December 13, 1861 – December 6, 1891) was a promising American writer, editor, and publisher who died young, and is now remembered primarily for his connection to Rudyard Kipling. His sister Carrie Balestier married Kipling in 1891.

== Biography ==
Balestier was born in Rochester, New York. His paternal grandfather, whose ancestors were from Martinique, was a founder of the Century Association; his maternal grandfather was E. Peshine Smith, who with Commodore Matthew Perry completed commercial negotiations with Japan. Balestier studied for one year at Cornell University, and studied law for one summer (1883) at the University of Virginia. He worked for a short time at the Rochester Post Express, and later ran his own newspaper in Rochester.

At age 17 he began to send stories to the Atlantic Monthly, then edited by William Dean Howells. His first published work was a story entitled "A Patent Philter", which was published serially in the daily New York Tribune in 1884. His first novel, A Fair Device, was published in the same year, as was his campaign biography for presidential candidate James G. Blaine. In 1886, he published A Victorious Defeat. He co-authored with Rudyard Kipling The Naulahka, published in 1892 after his death.

Around 1884, the John W. Lovell Company in New York City made him editor of their magazine, Tid Bits, which he renamed Time and made a success. In the autumn of 1888, he moved to England to purchase literary copyrights for the Lovells. In this profession, he became acquainted with all the leading British authors, and particularly with Henry James, who wrote in 1890 that "I have lately seen much of the admirably acute and intelligent young Balestrier." In 1890, he formed a partnership with William Heinemann to establish the firm Heinemann & Balestier, which published the Review of Reviews in London, and The English Library series in continental Europe.

At about that time, Edmund Gosse described him as a "mixture of suave Colonial French and the strained nervous New England blood.... a carefully dressed young-old man or elderly youth, clean-shaven, with smooth dark hair, thin nose, large sensitive ears, and whimsically mobile mouth."

Balestier died in 1891 in Dresden, a victim of typhoid fever. Henry James traveled to Dresden for the funeral, and described it as follows: "The English chaplain read the service with sufficient yet not offensive sonority, and the arrangements were of an admirable, decorously grave German kind." As Henry Adams later wrote, "I sat with Henry James an hour or two yesterday afternoon and found him in double trouble between the death of his friend Balestier and the steady decline of his sister."

Edmund Gosse wrote of Balestier that he had never met anyone "who had anything like his power of marshaling before his memory, in due order, all the militant English writers of the moment, small as well as great." In Balestier's obituary in the New York Times, William Dean Howells states that he knew him quite well and that "Mr. Balestier would have achieved great fame had he lived a few more years."

== Selected works ==
- A Common Story (story), The Century Magazine
- A Patent Philter (story), 1884
- A Fair Device, 1884
- James G. Blaine: A Sketch of His Life, R. Worthington, 1884
- A Victorious Defeat, 1886
- The Naulahka: A Story of West and East, with Rudyard Kipling, 1892
- Benefits Forgot, 1892
- The Average Woman, 1892
