= Women's health in India =

Demographic health topic

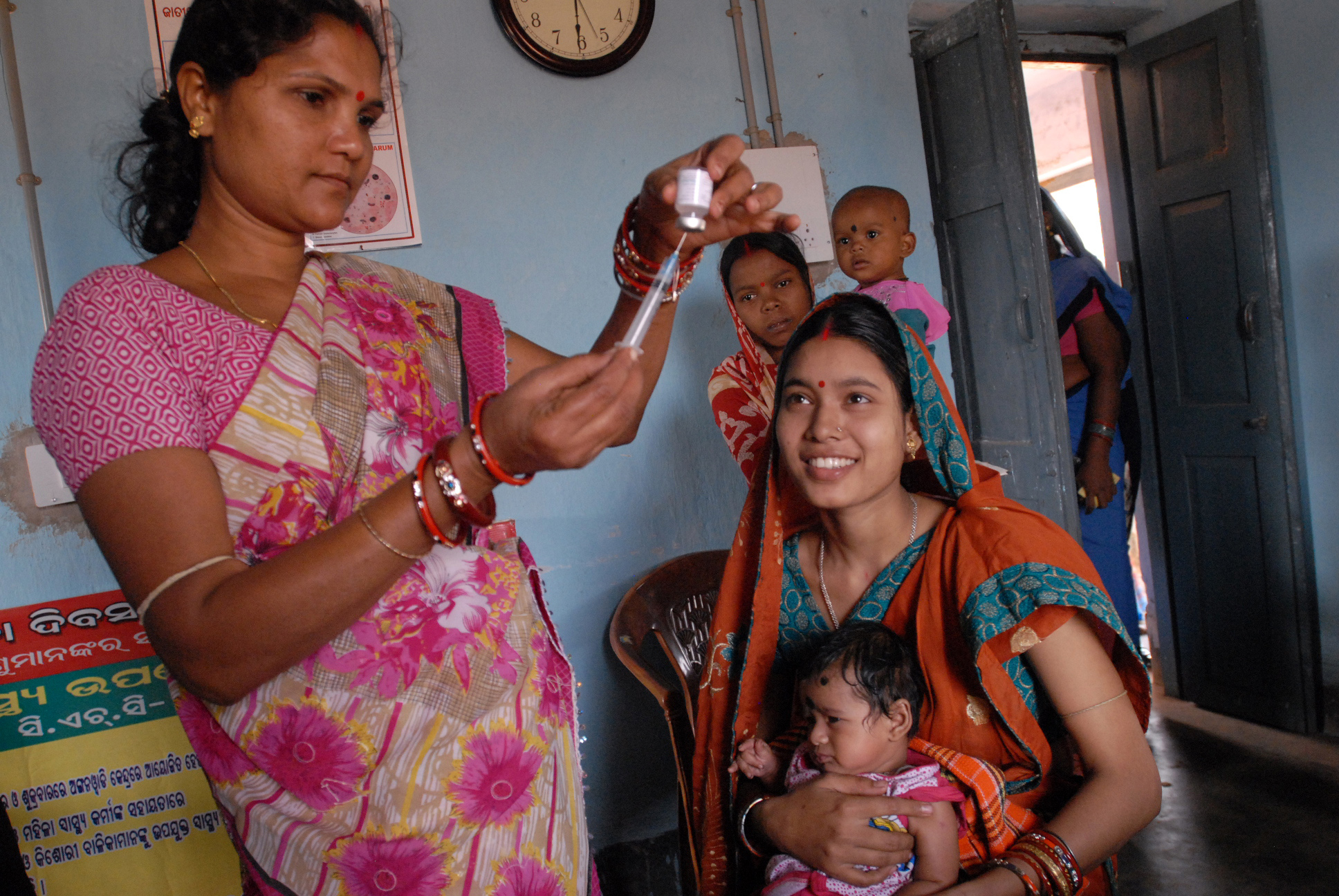
Community health worker preparing a vaccine in Odisha, India

Women's health in India can be examined in terms of multiple indicators, which vary by geography, socioeconomic standing and culture. To adequately improve the health of women in India multiple dimensions of wellbeing must be analysed in relation to global health averages and also in comparison to men in India. Health is an important factor that contributes to human wellbeing and economic growth.

Currently, women in India face a multitude of health problems, which ultimately affect the aggregate economy's output. Addressing the gender, class or ethnic disparities that exist in healthcare and improving the health outcomes can contribute to economic gain through the creation of quality human capital and increased levels of savings and investment.

== Gender bias in access to healthcare ==
The United Nations ranks India as a middle-income country. Findings from the World Economic Forum indicate that India is one of the worst countries in the world in terms of gender inequality. The 2011 United Nations Development Programme's Human Development Report ranked India 132 out of 187 in terms of gender inequality. The value of this multidimensional indicator, Gender Inequality Index (GII) is determined by numerous factors including maternal mortality rate, adolescent fertility rate, educational achievement and labour force participation rate. Gender inequality in India is exemplified by women's lower likelihood of being literate, continuing their education and participating in the labour force.

Gender is one of the main social determinants of health—which include social, economic, and political factors—that play a major role in the health outcomes of women in India and access to healthcare in India. Therefore, the high level of gender inequality in India negatively impacts the health of women. Studies have indicated that boys are more likely to receive treatment from health care facilities compared to girls, when controlled for SES status.

The role that gender plays in health care access can be determined by examining resource allocation within the household and public sphere. Gender discrimination begins before birth; females are the most commonly aborted gender in India. Even if a female fetus is not aborted, the mother's pregnancy can be a stressful experience, due to her family's preference for a son. Once born, daughters are prone to being fed less than sons, especially when there are multiple girls already in the household. As women mature into adulthood, many of the barriers preventing them from achieving equitable levels of health stem from the low status of women and girls in Indian society, particularly in the rural and poverty-affected areas.

The low status of—and subsequent discrimination against—women in India can be attributed to many cultural norms. Societal forces of patriarchy, hierarchy and multigenerational families contribute to Indian gender roles. Men use greater privileges and superior rights to create an unequal society that leaves women with little to no power. This societal structure is exemplified with women's low participation within India's national parliament and the labour force.

Women are also seen as less valuable to a family due to marriage obligations. Although illegal, Indian cultural norms often force payment of a dowry to the husband's family. The higher future financial burden of daughters creates a power structure that favours sons in household formation. Additionally, women are often perceived as being incapable of taking care of parents in old age, which creates even greater preference for sons over daughters.

Taken together, women are oftentimes seen less valuable than men. With lower involvement in the public sphere—as exemplified by the labour and political participation rates—and the stigma of being less valuable within a family, women face a unique form of gender discrimination.

Gender inequalities, in turn, are directly related to poor health outcomes for women. Numerous studies have found that thStudies indicate gender differences in hospital admission rates, influenced by varying access to healthcare resources.e rates of admission to hospitals vary dramatically with gender, with men visiting hospitals more frequently than women. Differential access to healthcare occurs because women typically are entitled to a lower share of household resources and thus utilise healthcare resources to a lesser degree than men.

fAmartya Sen has attributed access to fewer household resources to their weaker bargaining power within the household. Furthermore, it has been found that Indian women frequently underreport illnesses. The underreporting of illness may contribute to these cultural norms and gender expectations within the household. Gender also dramatically influences the use of antenatal care and utilisation of immunisations.

A study by Choi in 2006 found that boys are more likely to receive immunisations than girls in rural areas. This finding has led researchers to believe that the sex of a child leads to different levels of health care being administered in rural areas. There is also a gender component associated with mobility. Indian women are more likely to have difficulty traveling in public spaces than men, resulting in greater difficulty to access services.

=== Cooperative conflicts approach to gender biases ===
Amartya Sen's cooperative conflicts approach to gender biases frames women's gender disadvantage through three different responses: breakdown wellbeing, perceived interest and perceived contribution responses. The breakdown well-being response—derived from the Nash equilibrium—describes breakdown positions between individuals during cooperative decisions. When the breakdown position of one individual is less than the other person, the solution to any conflict will ultimately result in less favourable conditions for the first individual. In terms of women's health in India, the overall gender disadvantage facing women—represented by cultural and societal factors that favour men over women—negatively impacts their ability to make decisions with regards to seeking out healthcare.

The perceived interest response describes the outcome of a bargained decision when one individual attaches less value to his or her well-being. Any bargaining solution derived between the aforementioned individual and another individual will always result in a less favourable outcome for the person who attaches less value to their well-being. The health status of women in India relates to the perceived interest response because of the societal and cultural practices that create an environment where the self-worth of women is marginalised compared to men. Therefore, outcomes relating to healthcare decisions within households will favour the men, due to greater self-worth.

The perceived contribution response describes the more favourable position of an individual when the individual's contribution is perceived as contributing more to a group than other individuals. The more favourable perception gives the individual a better outcome in a bargaining solution. In terms of women's health in India, males' perceived contribution to household productivity is higher than that of women, which ultimately affects the bargaining power that women have with regards to accessing healthcare.

== Problems with India's healthcare system ==
At the turn of the 21st century India's health care system is strained in terms of the number of healthcare professionals including doctors and nurses. The health care system is also highly concentrated in urban areas. This results in many individuals in rural areas seeking care from unqualified providers with varying results. It has also been found that many individuals who claim to be physicians actually lack formal training. Nearly 25 percent of physicians classified as allopathic (mainstream medical) providers actually had no medical training; this phenomenon varies geographically.

Women are negatively affected by the geographic bias within implementation of the current healthcare system in India. Of all health workers in the country, nearly two thirds are men. This especially affects rural areas where it has been found that out of all doctors, only 6 percent are women. This translates into approximately 0.5 female allopathic physicians per 10,000 individuals in rural areas.

A disparity in access to maternal care between rural and urban populations is one of the ramifications of a highly concentrated urban medical system. According to Government of India National Family Health Survey (NFHS II, 1998–1999) the maternal mortality in rural areas is approximately 132 percent the number of maternal mortality in urban areas.

The Indian government has taken steps to alleviate some of the current gender inequalities. In 1992, the government of India established the National Commission for Women. The commission was meant to address many of the inequalities women face, specifically rape, family and guardianship. However, the slow pace of change in the judicial system and the aforementioned cultural norms have prevented the full adoption of policies meant to promote equality between men and women.

In 2005 India enacted the National Rural Health Mission (NRHM). Some of its primary goals were to reduce infant mortality and also the maternal mortality ratio. Additionally, the NHRM aimed to create universal access to public health services and also balance the gender ratio. However, a 2011 research study conducted by Nair and Panda found that although India was able to improve some measures of maternal health since the enactment of the NHRM in 2005, the country was still far behind most emerging economies.

== Outcomes ==
=== Health problems of tribal women ===
The high incidence of breast lumps among Adivasi women of Adilabad in Telangana has created apprehension of more serious health impacts for this remote population. "Leave alone breast cancer or any other type of carcinoma, even routine mammarian infections were unknown among indigenous people belonging to the Gond, Pardhan, Kolam and Thotti," points out Dr. Thodsam Chandu, the District Immunisation Officer, himself a Gond.

=== Malnutrition and morbidity ===
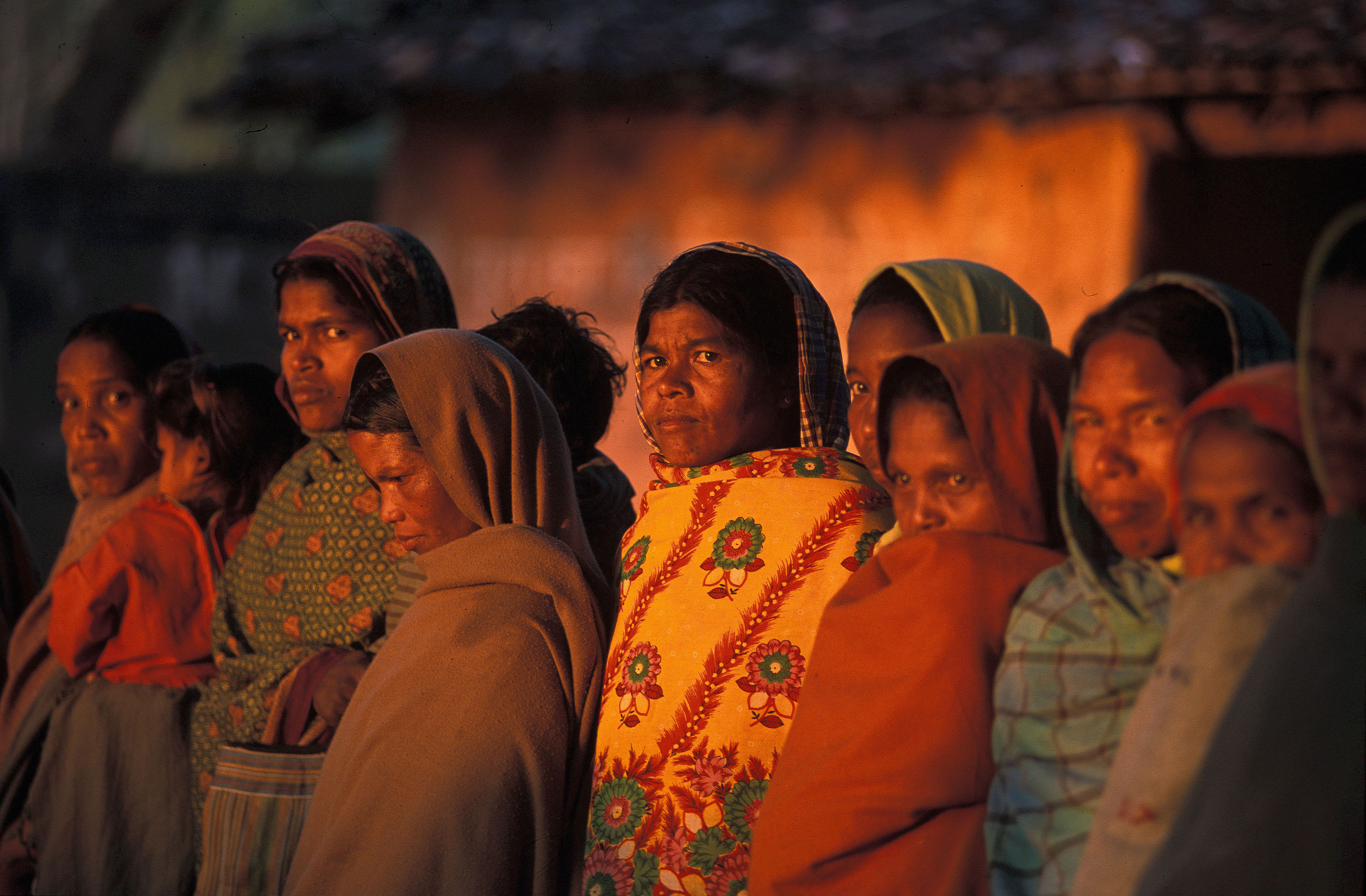
Poverty and malnutrition are common issues faced by Indian women.

Nutrition plays a major role in and individual's overall health; psychological and physical health status is often dramatically impacted by the presence of malnutrition. India currently has one of the highest rates of malnourished women among developing countries. A study in 2000 found that nearly 70 percent of non-pregnant women and 75 percent of pregnant women were anemic in terms of iron-deficiency. One of the main drivers of malnutrition is gender specific selection of the distribution of food resources.

A 2012 study by Tarozzi have found the nutritional intake of early adolescents to be approximately equal. However, the rate of malnutrition increases for women as they enter adulthood. Furthermore, Jose et al. found that malnutrition increased for ever-married women compared to non-married women.

Maternal malnutrition has been associated with an increased risk of maternal mortality and also child birth defects. Addressing the problem of malnutrition would lead to beneficial outcomes for women and children.

=== Breast cancer ===
India is facing a growing cancer epidemic, with a large increase in the number of women with breast cancer. By the year 2020 nearly 70 percent of the world's cancer cases will come from developing countries, with a fifth of those cases coming from India.

Much of the sudden increase in breast cancer cases is attributed to the rise in Westernisation of the country. This includes, but is not limited to, westernised diet, greater urban concentrations of women, and later child bearing. Additionally, problems with India's health care infrastructure prevent adequate screenings and access for women, ultimately leading to lower health outcomes compared to more developed countries. As of 2012, India has a shortage of trained oncologists and cancer centres, further straining the health care system.

=== Maternal health ===
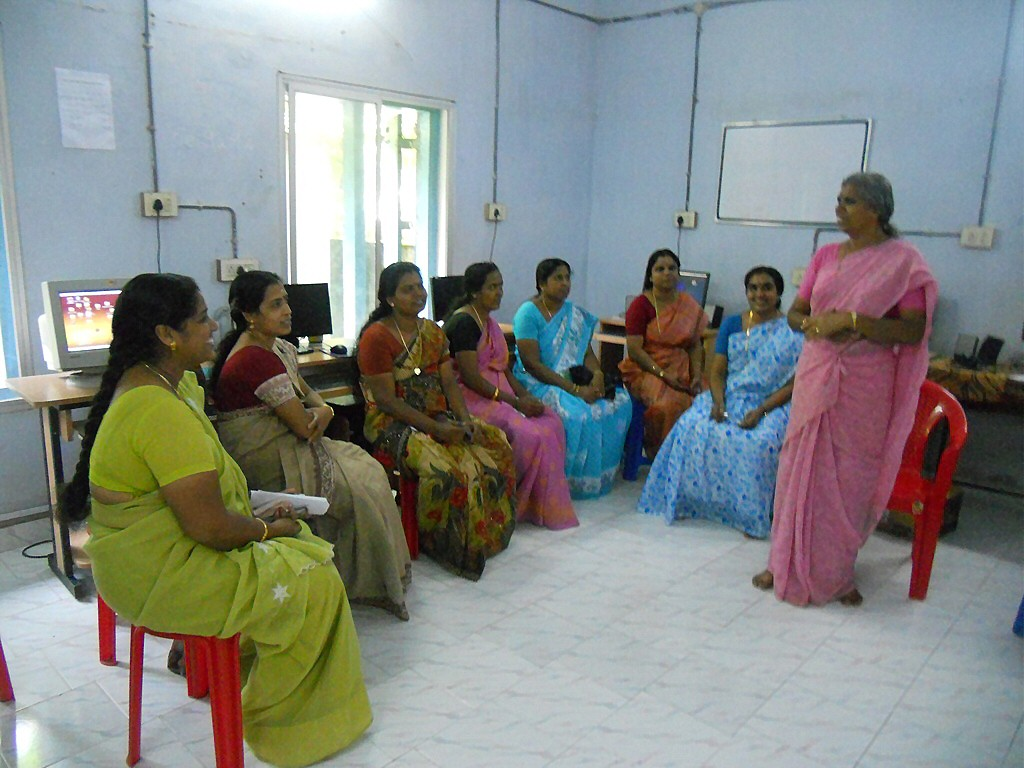
Maternal health: parental awareness class for women in Kerala

The lack of maternal health contributes to future economic disparities for mothers and their children. Poor maternal health often affects a child's health in adverse ways and also decreases a woman's ability to participate in economic activities. Therefore, national health programmes such as the National Rural Health Mission (NRHM) and the Family Welfare Programme have been created to address the maternal health care needs of women across India.

Although India has witnessed dramatic growth over the last two decades, maternal mortality remains stubbornly high in comparison to many developing nations As a nation, India contributed nearly 20 percent of all maternal deaths worldwide between 1992 and 2006. Factors contributing to high maternal mortality rates are often associated with utilization of antenatal care (ANC) prior to and during childbirth. Barriers to seeking care include delays in the decision to seek care, arrival at a medical institution, and provision of quality care. Autonomy and empowerment are correlated with the decision to seek care; women who are more actively involved in their family's decision-making processes are able to choose to utilize maternal care resources. As a result, ANC utilization is lower for Muslim women and women in joint families. Custom may also dictate that maternal care is unnecessary, particularly during the first trimester which has the lowest rates of ANC utilization. The cost of institutional care may also cause women to seek alternative care, such as utilizing a dai (traditional birth attendant) during childbirth. Dais are particularly useful options for care in low-resource settings. Arrival at a medical institution is often largely complicated by distance. Women may not have access to transportation, or they may not be able to reach an institution for childbirth after labor has initiated. Even if a woman chooses to seek maternal care and is able to successfully access a medical facility, poor quality of care can deter care utilization. Resources such as midwives, qualified doctors, or ambulances are not readily available at all hospitals; rural areas are especially lacking in these resources, leading to significantly lower ANC utilization compared to urban areas.

However, maternal mortality is not identical across all of India or even a particular state; urban areas often have lower overall maternal mortality due to the availability of adequate medical resources. For example, states with higher literacy and growth rates tend to have greater maternal health and also lower infant mortality, reporting higher rates of maternal care utilization compared to their rural counterparts.

==== HIV/AIDS ====
As of July 2005, women represent approximately 40 percent of the HIV/AIDS cases in India. The number of infections is rising in many locations in India; the rise can be attributed to cultural norms, lack of education, and lack of access to contraceptives such as condoms. The government public health system does not provide adequate measures such as free HIV testing, only further worsening the problem.

Cultural aspects also increase the prevalence of HIV infection. The insistence of a woman for a man to use a condom could imply promiscuity on her part, and thus may hamper the usage of protective barriers during sex. Furthermore, one of the primary methods of contraception among women has historically been sterilisation, which does not protect against the transmission of HIV.

The current mortality rate of HIV/AIDS is higher for women than it is for men. As with other forms of women's health in India the reason for the disparity is multidimensional. Due to higher rates of illiteracy and economic dependence on men, women are less likely to be taken to a hospital or receive medical care for health needs in comparison to men. This creates a greater risk for women to suffer from complications associated with HIV. There is also evidence to suggest that the presence of HIV/AIDS infection in a woman could result in lower or no marriage prospects, which creates greater stigma for women suffering from HIV/AIDS.

==== Reproductive rights ====
India legalised abortion through legislation in the early 1970s. However, access remains limited to cities. Less than 20 percent of health care centres are able to provide the necessary services for an abortion. The current lack of access is attributed to a shortage of physicians and lack of equipment to perform the procedure.

The most common foetus that is aborted in India is a female one. Numerous factors contribute to the abortion of female foetuses. For example, women who are highly educated and had a first-born female child are the most likely to abort a female. The act of sex-selective abortion has contributed to a skewed male to female ratio. As of the 2011 census, the sex ratio among children aged 0–6 continued a long trend towards more males.

The preference for sons over daughters in India is rooted in social, economic and religious reasons. Women are often believed to be of a lower value in society due to their non-breadwinner status. Financial support, old age security, property inheritance, dowry and beliefs surrounding religious duties all contribute to the preference of sons over daughters. One of the main reasons behind the preference of sons is the potential burden of having to find grooms for daughters. Families of women in India often have to pay a dowry and all expenses related to marriage in order to marry off a daughter, which increases the cost associated with having a daughter.

=== Cardiovascular health ===
Cardiovascular disease is a major contributor to female mortality in India. Indians account for 60% of the world's heart disease burden, despite accounting for less than 20% of the world's population. Indian women have a particular high mortality from cardiac disease and NGOs such as the Indian Heart Association have been raising awareness about this issue. Women have higher mortality rates relating to cardiovascular disease than men in India because of differential access to health care between the sexes. One reason for the differing rates of access stems from social and cultural norms that prevent women from accessing appropriate care. For example, it was found that among patients with congenital heart disease, women were less likely to be operated on than men because families felt that the scarring from surgery would make the women less marriageable.

Furthermore, it was found that families failed to seek medical treatment for their daughters because of the stigma associated with negative medical histories. A study conducted by Pednekar et al. in 2011 found that out of 100 boys and girls with congenital heart disease, 70 boys would have an operation while only 22 girls will receive similar treatment.

The primary driver of this difference is due to cultural standards that give women little leverage in the selection of their partner. Elder family members must find suitable husbands for young females in the households. If women are known to have adverse previous medical histories, their ability to find a partner is significantly reduced. This difference leads to diverging health outcomes for men and women.

=== Mental health ===
Mental health consists of a broad scope of measurements of mental well-being including depression, stress and measurements of self-worth. Numerous factors affect the prevalence of mental health disorders among women in India, including older age, low educational attainment, fewer children in the home, lack of paid employment and excessive spousal alcohol use. There is also evidence to suggest that disadvantages associated with gender increase the risk for mental health disorders. Women who find it acceptable for men to use violence against female partners may view themselves as less valuable than men. In turn, this may lead women to seek out fewer avenues of healthcare inhibiting their ability to cope with various mental disorders.

One of the most common disorders that disproportionately affect women in low-income countries is depression. Indian women suffer from depression at higher rates than Indian men. Indian women who are faced with greater degrees of poverty and gender disadvantage show a higher rate of depression. The difficulties associated with interpersonal relationships—most often marital relationships—and economic disparities have been cited as the main social drivers of depression.

It was found that Indian women typically describe the somatic symptoms rather than the emotional and psychological stressors that trigger the symptoms of depression. This often makes it difficult to accurately assess depression among women in India in light of no admonition of depression. Gender plays a major role in postnatal depression among Indian women. Mothers are often blamed for the birth of a female child. Furthermore, women who already have a female child often face additional pressures to have male children that add to their overall stress level.

Women in India have a lower onset of schizophrenia than men. However, women and men differ in the associated stigmas they must face. While men tend to suffer from occupational functioning, while women suffer in their marital functioning. The time of onset also plays a role in the stigmatisation of schizophrenia. Women tend to be diagnosed with schizophrenia later in life, oftentimes following the birth of their children. The children are often removed from the care of the ill mother, which may cause further distress.

==== Suicide ====
Indian women have higher rates of suicide than women in most developed countries. Women in India also have a higher rate of suicide compared to men. The most common reasons cited for women's suicide are directly related to depression, anxiety, gender disadvantage and anguish related to domestic violence.

Many of the high rates of suicide found across India and much of south Asia have been correlated with gender disadvantage. Gender disadvantage is often expressed through domestic violence towards women. The suicide rate is particularly high among female sex workers in India, who face numerous forms of discrimination for their gender and line of work.

=== Domestic violence ===
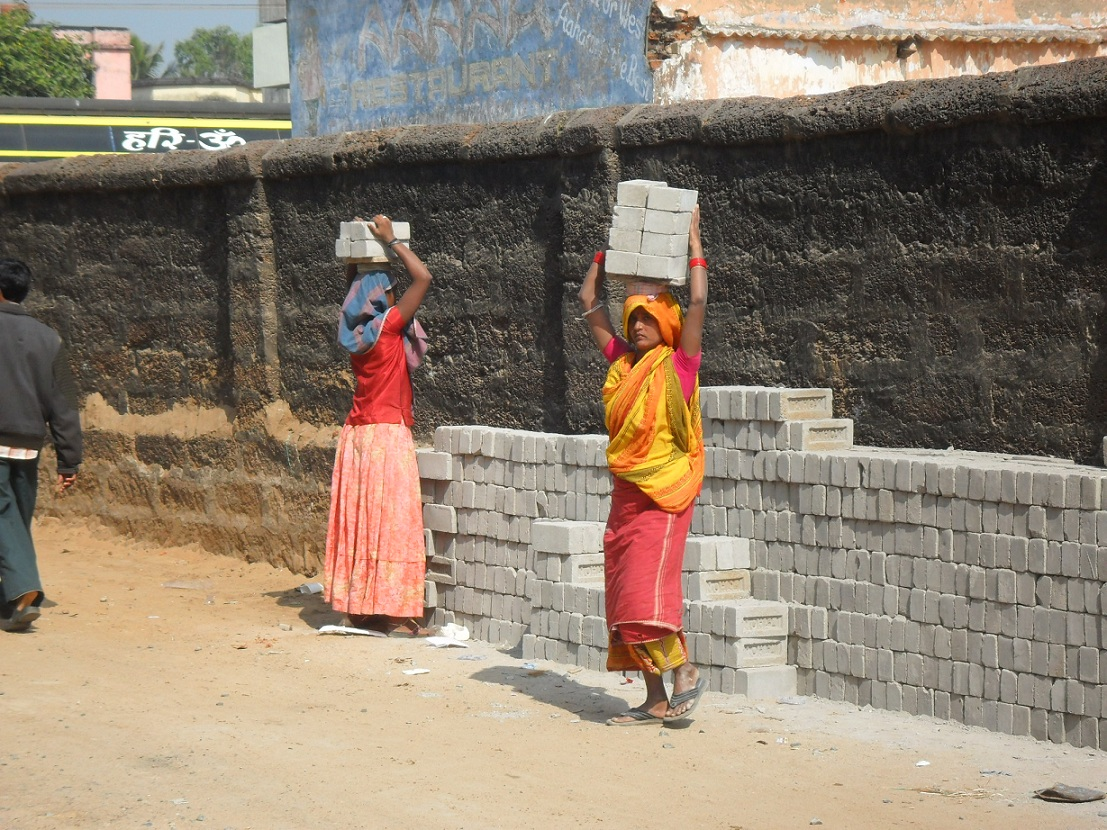
Women who are in the labour force in India often face greater risk of being the victims of domestic violence.

Domestic violence is a major problem in India. Domestic violence—acts of physical, psychological, and sexual violence against women—is found across the world and is currently viewed as a hidden epidemic by the World Health Organization. The effects of domestic violence go beyond the victim; generational and economic effects influence entire societies. Economies of countries where domestic violence is prevalent tend to have lower female labour participation rate, in addition to higher medical expenses and higher rates of disability. Approximately one third of Indian women experience intimate partner violence (IPV) during their adult years.

The prevalence of domestic violence in India is associated with the cultural norms of patriarchy, hierarchy, and multigenerational families. Patriarchal domination occurs when males use superior rights, privileges and power to create a social order that gives women and men differential gender roles. The resultant power structure leaves women as powerless targets of domestic violence. Men use domestic violence as a way of controlling behaviour.

In a response to the 2005-2006 India National Family Health Survey III, 31 percent of all women reported having been the victims of physical violence in the 12 months preceding the survey. However, the actual number of victims may be much higher. Women who are victimised by domestic violence may underreport or fail to report instances. This may be due to a sense of shame or embarrassment stemming from cultural norms associated with women being subservient to their husbands. Furthermore, underreporting by women may occur in order to protect family honour.

A 2012 study conducted by Kimuna, using data from the 2005-2006 India National Family Health Survey III, found that domestic violence rates vary across numerous sociological, geographical and economic measures. The study found that the poorest women fared worst among middle and high-income women. Researchers believe that the reason for higher rates of domestic violence come from greater familial pressures resulting from poverty. Additionally the study found that women who were part of the labour force faced greater domestic violence. According to the researchers, working women may be upsetting the patriarchal power system within Indian households.

Men may feel threatened by the earning potential and independence of women and react violently to shift the gender power structure back in their favour. One of the largest factors associated with domestic violence against women was the prevalence of alcohol use by men within the households. A 2005 study conducted by Pradeep Panda and Bina Agarwal found that the incidence of domestic violence against women dropped dramatically with women's ownership of immovable property, which includes land and housing.

== See also ==
- Domestic violence in India
- Dowry system in India
- Female foeticide in India
- Feminism in India
- Gender inequality in India
- Gender pay gap in India
- Men's rights movement in India
- National Commission for Women
- Pre-Conception and Pre-Natal Diagnostic Techniques Act, 1994
- Rape in India
- Sexism in India
- Water supply and sanitation in India
- Welfare schemes for women in India
- Women in agriculture in India
- Women in India
- Women in Indian Armed Forces
- Women's Reservation Bill
- Women's suffrage in India
- Dowry death
