= Childbirth in India =

Childbirth practices in India are shaped by the prevalence of religious customs and joint-family living, India's young average population, the lower national average age at marriage, and disparities in social status and literacy between men and women. Inadequate maternal health care services in India are a result of poor organization, the huge rural-urban divide, and large interstate disparities coupled with stringent social-economic and cultural constraints.

== Social structure and organization ==
The joint-family system is one of the basic features of Hindu social organization. Since Hinduism is the primary practiced religion in India, the joint-family system constitutes the majority of family structures in India. The joint-family system is described as follows: "In structure, it comprises a married man, his father, his grandfather and his collaterals within three generations. The different kinsmen along with their spouses and children occupy the same dwelling, eat and worship together, and enjoy property in common. They cooperate in economic activity and, even if the members are differentiated occupationally, pool their earnings. The joint-family provides nursing care for the sick and afflicted, social security for the unemployed, and support for the aged." "They share the various routines, problems, and joys of social living, have strong feelings of mutual obligation during crises, and regard self-interest as being identical with family welfare. Their respect for the wisdom and justice of the eldest male permits him and his spouse to render decisions which affect each and every member of the unit."

=== Marriage ===
"The median ages at marriage for women and men in Central India are slightly lower than the national averages. Early age at marriage is especially rampant in the villages, and among couples belonging to the Hindu and Buddhist faiths." Moreover, the age at which males and females get married in India have remained constant for several decades. In the 1960s, it was reported that the median ages at marriage in India are 16.4 years for urban women, 14.6 years for rural women, 23.0 years for urban men, and 20.2 years for rural men.

=== Literacy ===
The literacy rate in India has improved considerably over time. The rate has increased from 43.56 percent in 1981 to 52.11 percent in 1991. Literacy rates vary significantly among different regions of the nation. For example, the literacy rate is higher in south India than in the north. Also, a significant literacy gap exists between men and women. In 1991, the male literacy rate reached 62.86 percent and the female literacy rate was only 39.42 percent.

=== Female and male relationships ===
Historically, Indian women had equal rights as men. Women goddesses were prayed to and worshipped, which baffled many westerners. Later years due to colonization and continuous attacks, women were forced to limit to households in order to protect them; this became customary for a period. That changed in modern India, where women are thriving similarly to men.

== Economic context ==
Farming is the largest single occupation in India. Approximately 28 percent of the Indian population lives below the poverty line with large inter-state variations. Poverty in India is concentrated in the central and eastern states; poverty levels in these areas are significantly higher than the nation's average. The central and eastern states of India account for 55 percent of the total poor population in India. These states also contributed to half of the maternal deaths in India, likely due to the fact that maternal care services are very limited in these states.

The western and southern states of India are economically and demographically more advanced than the northern and eastern states. Subsequently, these states account for only 17 percent of maternal deaths, most likely due to a higher use of maternal care services in these areas. Studies indicate that there is a negative association between the use of maternal care and maternal mortality ratio.

In 2011, 69 percent of India's population was rural. Many citizens live in villages and are involved in agriculture. Rural areas often have inhabitants that live below the poverty line. A portion of the population lives in cities, considered the wealthiest portion of the population. However, the urban population includes many poor people from the countryside, who often live in slums and make up a fifth of India's city dwellers. This portion of the population often works as laborers or in services. India also has a huge urban middle class that are businessmen and professionals.

== Health context ==
In India deaths due to malnutrition, famines, and gastro-intestinal ailments are being decreased through improved agricultural production and distribution and the purification of water supplies.

In addition, the Government of India and the World Health Organization have launched national programs of medical care and preventive medicine which, on the basis of recent surveys, appear effective in lowering the incidence of smallpox, cholera, plague, malaria, filariasis, tuberculosis, and venereal diseases.

In regard to maternal healthy theories, age at marriage and fertility have been shown to be correlated. Also, poor states in India contributed to half of the maternal deaths in India. Therefore, there is a negative association between the use of maternal care and maternal mortality ratio.

=== Health statistics ===
The percent of women in India who had an unmet need for family planning is 21 percent. 75 percent of women have one visit covered by insurance for antenatal visits. Fifty percent of women have at least 4 antenatal visits covered by their insurance. 67 percent of women in India have their births attended by a skilled medical professional. Only 8 percent of births resulted in a cesarean section. 48 percent of women went to their postnatal visits 2 days after their birth.

The total fertility rate per woman in India is 2.5.

The average life expectancy in India is 66 years old. For women, it is 68 years old; for men, it is 64.

In 2015, India's maternal mortality was 174 per 100,000 live births. In 2005, it was estimated that the maternal mortality ratio in India is 16 times higher than that of Russia, 10 times that of China and 4 times higher than Brazil. Among developing countries, India contributes to the largest amount of births in the world a year, averaging 27 million births. However, India also accounts for 20 percent of global maternal deaths in year.

== Pregnancy behaviors and beliefs ==
=== Prenatal care ===
Prenatal care access and utilization is largely affected by socioeconomic status, geographic location, and maternal education and autonomy. The use of prenatal care increased 12 percent from 1992 to 2006, but this increase was due to greater utilization by non-poor women. Poor women's utilization of prenatal care remained relatively stagnant, at only 6.3 percent. Geographically, some Indian states have significantly lower rates of prenatal care. For example, according to 2006 studies in Uttar Pradesh, only 9 percent of women receive prenatal care, as opposed to 72 percent in Tamil Nadu. Higher rates in Tamil Nadu could be a result of the Janani Suraksha Yojana program, which financially incentivizes women to have birth in a health facility and receive a tubal ligation after 1 to 2 births. This program has also resulted in a lower maternal mortality ratio, lower fertility rate, and higher female literacy rate.

=== Views of pregnancy, birth, and infertility ===
Pregnancy is perceived positively in India, and most married women are extremely happy to learn of their pregnancy. Fertility is highly valued, and community members may begin to look negatively upon a woman if she is married for a year without any sign of pregnancy.

=== Preparation for birth ===
In preparing for birth, Indian women who live with their husbands generally seek counsel from their mothers-in-law. The advice of maternal figures is highly valued, and expectant mothers will follow the childbearing rituals passed down to them by their mother-in-law. Sleep positions, eating habits, and level of activity are all influenced by the views of older women of the family. Aside from what is told to them, women receive very little knowledge regarding birth itself. Often, women are very fearful for their birth, as they have only been told of the pain from others.

The maternal figures of the family, especially the mothers-in-law, pass on customs regarding nutrition, hygiene, and daily activities during pregnancy. Frequently, "cold" foods such as fruit are avoided during pregnancy for fear of causing sickness or stillbirth. In some traditions, women may only drink hot tea and rice milk.

The older women of the family determine each expectant mother's activity level and sleep habits, following family tradition. Some women are told to increase their activity levels in order to prepare the body for the hard work of labor, while other rest throughout pregnancy to save energy. Sleeping may also be regulated, and some women never sleep on their back or turn over during pregnancy.

== Labor and birth ==
=== Support during labor ===
Pain is expected during labor and is seen as part of the natural labor process. There is little knowledge about options such as epidurals in some communities. Depending on birth location, some women receive pain relief from warm water and massage, while other receive little support or even human touch. In hospital births, private hospitals have a higher rate of pain relief. One study found the rate for private hospitals to be 9.9 percent while the public hospitals had a rate of 0.9 percent.

During labour, the mother and child both need adequate monitoring. Inadequate monitoring during labour can increase the chances of the baby going into distress which can potentially lead to the death of child before birth, known as stillbirth. The largest number of stillbirths, more than 330,000 every year, happen in India.

Female relatives and neighbors may support the mother by serving tea, heating water, and helping with wrapping the newborn after birth.

Birth location often determines the amount and type of supportive behavior. Women who give birth in hospitals are generally supported by nurses, although the extent of this support varies. Some express dissatisfaction with the lack of physical touch and comfort in the hospital. At home, women are supported by the "wise women" of the family with massage and warm water, although this also varies by family.

=== Birth attendants and health care providers ===
On average, 83.1 percent of births are attended by skilled health personnel. However, this varies greatly by region. Traditional birth assistants (TBAs) attend 37 percent of home births in India. These TBAs often lack knowledge and literacy regarding safe birthing practices, but could have a large influence in reducing maternal mortality if properly trained. If educated properly on birthing positions, sanitary practices, weighing of the baby, maintaining adequate newborn body temperature, and handling postpartum hemorrhage, maternal and infant health in India could improve dramatically. The other 63 percent of home births are unattended, and women who deliver in a health facility or hospital are cared for by nurses and doctors. A part of the TBA’s job is to provide mothers with culturally appropriate care. In India, it is important to uphold the dignity of a woman during childbirth; in conjunction with the caste system, it is common for birth attendants, or Dai, of lower castes than the mother to maintain a hygienic birth space. The care of traditional birth attendants extends to any stage of gestation and postpartum care.

The majority of TBAs, who attend 37 percent of home births in India, are married and have not been to school. They may be trained or untrained, but trained TBAs are generally younger with less work experience, and are paid for their services. The untrained TBAs are older, more experienced, and are generally unpaid. Most TBAs entered the field after either attending several family births, birthing their own child, or following the footsteps of a family member.

Some women experience disrespect by hospital staff during childbirth.

=== Placental delivery ===
After the placenta is delivered, the cord is cut and an herbal oil, face powder, or ash mixture is rubbed on the cut section. The placenta is buried near the home, or, in some communities, burned. Nine days after birth, a ceremony is conducted at the placental burial site to announce the name of the baby. At home births, the baby is sometimes not caught after being delivered and remains lying on the floor until the placenta is delivered.

=== Technology in birth ===
The cesarean section rate in India was 8.2 percent in 2008, which is below the WHO's recommended 10–15 percent. However, this number is higher in some private hospitals. The use of interventions such as episiotomies, induction, and cesarean section varies between private and public hospitals. A study of women in Delhi found that the cesarean rate in private hospitals was 53.8 percent while the rate at public hospitals was 23.7 percent. The same study reported that the episiotomy rate in private hospitals was 74.9 percent compared to the public hospital rate of 57.8 percent. The rates of induction of labor were found to be 30.8 percent and 20.6 percent.

== Postpartum ==
=== The postpartum period ===
The postpartum period begins after the delivery of the placenta. In Hindu communities, a "sutak" or "pollution confinement" period, which is a length of time for which the mother and baby are considered unclean, follows the birth. The mother and baby are in a place of confinement, usually a room in the home, during the "sutak" period. This can range in length from 3 to 10 days, and no family or community members may interact with the mother and baby during this time. At the end of this period, a "kuan pujan" or "ceremony at the well" occurs, in which the mother and baby are purified and considered clean. In Muslim communities, this period does not exist. The baby is sprinkled with holy water in a ritual bath.

=== Rites of passage ===
Women receive a henna tattoo after birth, which is meant to prevent depression and sickness and promote bonding between mother and baby. A ceremony is conducted on the ninth day postpartum to announce the name of the baby at the placental burial site. Additionally, the "kuan pujan" ceremony is performed around the same time to signify the cleanliness of mother and baby.

Hindu women may follow the "hot" and "cold" balanced diet. "Hot" foods are those high in protein, sodium, and acid, while "cold" foods are those that are sweet or starchy. Many women are advised to avoid cold foods to avoid sickness, and have more hot foods during the postpartum period to relieve stomach pain. Other women in India generally continue to heed the advice of their mothers-in-law regarding the postnatal period.

=== Contraception ===
According to the World Health Organization, 54.8 percent of women utilized contraception in 2008. Female sterilization constitutes two-thirds of contraception use in Southern India, and is popular throughout the country. In some areas, there are financial incentives for undergoing tubal ligation after one or two children. Women who are Muslim, educated, or of higher socioeconomic status are more likely to choose more traditional, temporary methods of contraception instead of sterilization. Poor women typically experience more unwanted pregnancies, and therefore worse birth outcomes, due to lack of contraception access. Sterilization is less common for women who have not yet had a son.

== Newborns ==
=== Rites of passage ===
Many women mark their babies' faces with bindi and tie small threads around the baby's wrists, ankles, and neck to ward off evil spirits. On the ninth day postpartum, a ceremony to name the child is conducted at the site of the placental burial.

A male baby is considered preferable in Indian culture. Despite laws prohibiting sex-selective abortions, they still occur, and have caused an unbalanced male-to-female sex ratio in India. Due to their higher status, it is customary in some areas to wait until a male baby is at least one year old before cutting his hair. In this ceremony, done at a Hindu temple, the family offers thanks for the blessing of a son.

=== The first bath ===
If delivered by a TBA, the baby will most likely be bathed with warm water immediately by the assistant. In some communities, women report waiting at least 9 days before bathing their baby, with some waiting as long as 3 months. It is believed to cause sickness and fever in a young baby. Incense is also frequently used after bathing the baby, as it is believed to kill germs and dry the hair more quickly.

=== Food and drink ===
Newborns are given warm water, honey, mustard oil, tea, or goat's/cow's milk after birth, before breastfeeding is initiated. Most women initiate breastfeeding within a few hours after birth, and continue to exclusively breastfeed for 6–7 months. The newborn is typically not weighed after birth in India. Several factors contribute to the absence of weighing, such as lack of access to scales at home, lack of knowledge of scale usage in the hospital, belief that the "evil eye" will come upon the baby, and cultural tradition passed on through the generations. Due to this factor, most babies are simply said to be 2.5 to 3 kg, even when they have not been weighed. As India accounts for 40 percent of the world's low birth weight newborns, this is a large area of focus for improvement.

=== Circumcision ===
Among the Muslim community, circumcision is seen as a mandatory ritual.

=== Mortality rates ===
As per 2018 data, the infant mortality rate is 29.94 per 1000 live births and the neonatal mortality rate is 22.73 per 1000 live births.
